= Naomi Ginsberg =

American physicist, chemist and engineer

- Born: 1979 (age 46–47); Halifax, Nova Scotia, Canada
- Education: University of Toronto (BSc); Harvard University (PhD)
- Awards: Sloan Research Fellow; DARPA Young Faculty Award
- Scientific career
- Fields: Chemistry, Physics
- Workplaces: University of California, Berkeley
- Thesis: Manipulations with spatially compressed slow light pulses in Bose-Einstein condensates (2007)
- Doctoral advisor: Lene Hau
- Website: Group Website

Naomi Shauna Ginsberg (born 1979) is a Canadian electrical engineer and scientist. She is currently a professor of chemistry and physics at the University of California, Berkeley.

== Life and education ==
Ginsberg was born in Halifax, Nova Scotia. She earned her B.Sc. in engineering at the University of Toronto in 2000, and completed her PhD in physics at Harvard.

Her initial interest was biomedicine, but she graduated with an electrical engineering focus, and an emphasis on physics and optics. Accepted into Harvard, and while working in the research group of physics professor Lene Hau, Ginsberg studied Bose–Einstein condensates, ultracold clouds of atoms that exist at temperatures just a few billionths of a degree above absolute zero.

After being awarded her PhD for her thesis entitled "Manipulations with spatially compressed slow light pulses in Bose–Einstein condensates" with Lene Hau as her thesis advisor, Ginsberg chose to change direction and include other interests, moving to Berkeley to begin her postdoctoral research in 2007 with Graham Fleming as her advisor. She held a Glenn T. Seaborg Postdoctoral Fellowship at Lawrence Berkeley National Laboratory, until her appointment as an assistant professor in the chemistry department at UC Berkeley in 2010.

== Work ==
In a series of experiments the Hau Group at Harvard (which included Ginsberg) halted and stored a light signal in a condensate of sodium atoms, then transferred the signal into a second sodium cloud 160 μm away. The American Institute of Physics listed this feat as #1 in its Top Ten discoveries of 2007.

Ginsberg was the lead author on the paper "Coherent control of optical information with matter wave dynamics", that appeared on the cover of Nature in February of that year.

She now leads the Ginsberg Group, whose research objective is "to spatially resolve the complex dynamics of nanoscale processes such as photosynthetic light harvesting." Her current work is centered on "pushing the limits of spatially resolved spectroscopy and time resolved microscopy in multiple modalities", in order to try to answer fundamental and challenging questions that span chemistry, physics, and biology. Ginsberg's group uses multiple approaches, including ultrafast spectroscopy, light microscopy, and cathodoluminescence electron microscopy.

== Awards ==
In 2011, Ginsberg was awarded the David and Lucile Packard Foundation Fellowship for Science and Engineering.

In 2012, Her research attracted support from the Defense Advanced Research Projects Agency DARPA in the form of a Young Faculty Award for her work in "Predictive Materials Science; "Beneath the Bulk: Domain-Specific Efficiency and Degradation in Organic Photovoltaic Thin Films""

Ginsberg currently holds The Cupola Era Endowed Chair in the college of chemistry, and is a faculty scientist in the physical biosciences division at Lawrence Berkeley National Laboratory.

In 2015, Ginsberg was awarded a Sloan Research Fellowship.

In 2021, Ginsberg was named a Fellow of the American Physical Society (APS), after a nomination from the APS Division of Chemical Physics, "for the innovative development of spatiotemporally resolved imaging and spectroscopy methods, and for their use in elucidating energy transport in hierarchical and heterogeneous materials, as well as in the formation and transformation of said materials".

In 2022, Ginsberg was awarded the Carol D. Soc Distinguished Graduate Student Mentoring Award for Later-Career Faculty.

== Selected Publications ==
- J. A. Tan, J. T. Dull, S. E. Zeltmann, J. A. Tulyagankhodjaev, A. Liebman-Peláez, B. D. Folie, S. A. Dönges, O. Khatib, J. G. Raybin, T. D. Roberts, L. M. Hamerlynck, C. P. N. Tanner, J. Lee, C. Ophus, K. C. Bustillo, M. B. Raschke, H. Ohldag, A. M. Minor, B. P. Rand, N. S. Ginsberg, "Multimodal characterization of crystal structure and formation in rubrene thin films reveals erasure of orientational discontinuities," Adv. Funct. Mater., 2207867 (2023).
- Folie, B. D., Haber, J. B., Refaely-Abramson, S., Neaton, J. B., & Ginsberg, N. S. "Long-lived correlated triplet pairs in a π-stacked crystalline pentacene derivative." Journal of the American Chemical Society 140.6 (2018): 2326-2335.
- Bischak, C. G., Wong, A. B., Lin, E., Limmer, D. T., Yang, P., & Ginsberg, N. S. "Tunable polaron distortions control the extent of halide demixing in lead halide perovskites." The journal of physical chemistry letters 9.14 (2018): 3998-4005.
- Bischak, C. G., Hetherington, C. L., Wu, H., Aloni, S., Ogletree, D. F., Limmer, D. T., & Ginsberg, N. S. "Origin of reversible photoinduced phase separation in hybrid perovskites." Nano letters 17.2 (2017): 1028-1033.
- Dou, L., Wong, A. B., Yu, Y., Lai, M., Kornienko, N., Eaton, S. W., ... & Yang, P. "Atomically thin two-dimensional organic-inorganic hybrid perovskites." Science 349.6255 (2015): 1518-1521.
- G. S. Schlau-Cohen, A. Ishizaki, T. R. Calhoun, N. S. Ginsberg, M. Ballottari, R. Bassi, and G. R. Fleming. "Elucidation of the timescales and origins of quantum electronic coherence in LHCII", Nature Chemistry, 4, 389 (2012).
- N. S. Ginsberg, J. D. Davis, M. Ballottari, Y.-C. Cheng, R. Bassi, and G. R. Fleming. "Solving structure in the CP29 light harvesting complex with polarization-phased 2D electronic spectroscopy", Proceedings of the National Academy of Sciences, 108, 3848–3853 (2011).
- G. S. Schlau-Cohen, T. R. Calhoun, N. S. Ginsberg, M. Ballottari, R. Bassi, G. R. Fleming. "Spectroscopic Elucidation of Uncoupled Transition Energies in the Major Photosynthetic Light Harvesting Complex, LHCII", Proceedings of the National Academy of Sciences, 107, 13276 (2010).
- T. R. Calhoun, N. S. Ginsberg, G. S. Schlau-Cohen, Y-C. Cheng, M. Ballottari, R. Bassi, and G. R. Fleming. "Quantum Coherence Enabled Determination of the Energy Landscape in Light Harvesting Complex II", Journal of Physical Chemistry B, 113, 16291 (2009). (cover article)
- G. S. Schlau-Cohen, T. R. Calhoun, N. S. Ginsberg, E. L. Read, M. Ballottari, R. Bassi, G. R. Fleming. "Mapping Pathways of Energy Flow in LHCII with Two-Dimensional Electronic Spectroscopy", Journal of Physical Chemistry B, 113, 15352 (2009).
- Ginsberg, N. S.; Cheng, Y.-C.; Fleming, G. R. (2009). "Two-dimensional electronic spectroscopy of molecular aggregates" (PDF). Accounts of Chemical Research. 42 (9): 1352–63. doi:10.1021/ar9001075. PMID 19691358.
- N. S. Ginsberg, S. R. Garner, L. V. Hau. "Coherent control of optical information with matter wave dynamics", Nature 445, 623 (2007). – cover article; featured in New York Times, National Public Radio, Nature video stream and podcast
- Slowe, C.; Ginsberg, N. S.; Ristroph, T.; Goodsell, A.; Hau, L. V. (2005). "Ultraslow Light & Bose–Einstein Condensates: Two-way Control with Coherent Light & Atom Fields". Optics & Photonics News. 16 (5): 30. Bibcode:2005OptPN..16R..30S. doi:10.1364/opn.16.5.000030.
- N. S. Ginsberg, J. Brand, L. V. Hau. "Observation of Hybrid Soliton Vortex-Ring Structures in Bose–Einstein Condensates", Physical Review Letters 94, 040403 (2005) – highlighted in American Institute of Physics' Physics News Update, Physics Today's Physics Update, and selected as one of 44 articles from 2005 to be highlighted in APS News, February 2006
- Dutton, Z.; Ginsberg, N. S.; Slowe, C.; Hau, L. V. (2004). "The Art of Taming Light: Ultra-slow and Stopped Light". Europhysics News. 35 (2): 33. Bibcode:2004ENews..35...33D. doi:10.1051/epn:2004201.
- Hoult, D. I.; Ginsberg, N. S. (2001). "The Quantum Origins of the Free Induction Decay Signal and Spin Noise". Journal of Magnetic Resonance. 148 (1): 182–99. Bibcode:2001JMagR.148..182H. doi:10.1006/jmre.2000.2229. PMID 11133292.
