= Annette Vissing-Jørgensen =

Danish financial economist

- Occupations: Financial economist; professor
- Awards: Rigmor and Carl Holst-Knudsen Award for Scientific Research (2018)

Academic background
- Education: Aarhus University (B.A.); University of Warwick (M.S.); Massachusetts Institute of Technology (Ph.D.)

Academic work
- Institutions: University of California, Berkeley; Northwestern University; University of Chicago
- Main interests: Monetary policy; household economics; entrepreneurial finance
- Website: faculty.haas.berkeley.edu/vissing

Annette Vissing-Jørgensen is a Danish financial economist who holds the Arno A. Rayner Chair in Finance and Management in the Haas School of Business at the University of California, Berkeley. Topics in her research include monetary policy, household economics, and entrepreneurial finance. She was director of the American Finance Association for 2010 and 2012, of the European Finance Association for 2013, and of the Western Finance Association for 2017.

== Education and career ==
Vissing-Jørgensen earned a bachelor's degree in economics in 1993 from Aarhus University, and a master's degree in 1994 from the University of Warwick. She completed her Ph.D. in 1998 at the Massachusetts Institute of Technology, with a dissertation on Limited Stock Market Participation.

On completing her Ph.D. she joined the University of Chicago as an assistant professor in 1998. She moved to Northwestern University in 2002, and was given the Rayner Chair at the University of California, Berkeley in 2013. She has also held affiliations with the National Bureau of Economic Research since 2001 and the Copenhagen Business School since 2011. She chairs the scientific advisory board of the Norwegian Finance Initiative, and is an advisor to the Sveriges Riksbank.

== Recognition ==
Vissing-Jørgensen was elected as a Fellow of the Econometric Society in 2016. She won the Rigmor and Carl Holst-Knudsen Award for Scientific Research in 2018.
