= The Rowland Institute at Harvard =

Nonprofit, privately endowed basic research organization

Coordinates: 42.3637°N 71.0779°W

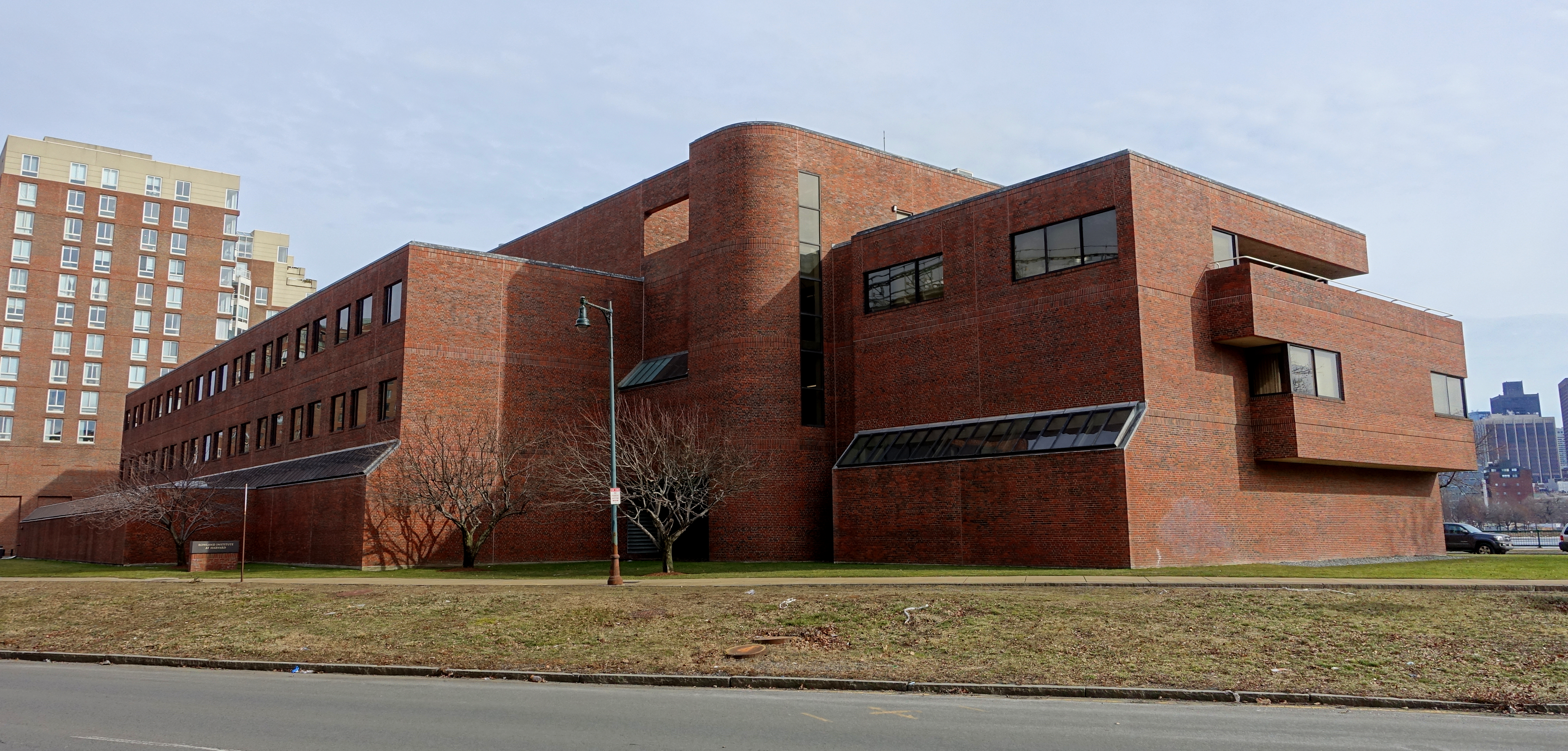
- Established: 1980
- Research type: Experimental science
- Director: Andrew Murray
- Location: Cambridge, Massachusetts, United States
- Operating agency: Harvard University
- Website: www.rowland.harvard.edu

The Rowland Institute at Harvard, formerly the Rowland Institute for Science, was founded by Edwin H. Land, the founder of Polaroid Corporation, as a nonprofit, privately endowed basic research organization in 1980. The institute merged with Harvard University on July 1, 2002. The Rowland Institute is dedicated to experimental science across a wide range of disciplines. Research subjects at the institute includes chemistry, physics and biology, and focus on interdisciplinary work and the development of new experimental tools. It was originally located on the Charles River near Kendall Square in Cambridge, Massachusetts, a few miles away from the main campus of Harvard. In 2024, the institute moved to Harvard's main campus, to a newly renovated building at 60 Oxford Street, in shared space with the Harvard Quantum Initiative.

== History ==
Land established the Rowland Institute with a mandate to work on problems that are "manifestly important and nearly impossible". For a small institute with such a broad mandate, Land conceived of a "sun and satellite" model, in which lab heads would serve as "suns" for their own research area, and simultaneously contribute their expertise as "satellites" in collaboration with the heads of the other labs. Land wanted members to be able to focus primarily on research, rather than proposal writing. Members were prohibited from applying for external grant support.

The Institute building on Land Blvd. was designed (principal architect Hugh Stubbins) and provisioned to support Land's vision. The ground floor included an expansive library, machine, woodworking, and electronic shops, a computer room, and an auditorium. There was also a large darkroom complex, designed with the help of Ansel Adams. The laboratories were distributed across the 2nd and 3rd floors, with areas for shared instrumentation and meeting rooms of various sizes. Major instrumentation included a JEOL 1200 STEM electron microscope equipped with X-ray detectors for elemental analysis, a JEOL GX-400 NMR spectrometer equipped for multinuclear detection, and a VAX 11/780 computer. The Institute was equipped with four apartments for visiting scientists and an artist studio for an artist-in-residence. Early visitors included Donald Glaser and John Holland.

Founding members of the institute, recruited by Land, spanned a range of disciplines:

- Joel Parks, trapped metal ion clusters
- James Foley, synthetic organic chemistry
- Howard Berg, bacterial locomotion/sensing
- Jean-Marc Fournier, optics, Lippman photography
- Jeffrey Hoch, biomolecular NMR
- Craig Shaefer, numerical optimization
- Robert Savoy, visual perception
- Stewart Wilson, classifier systems

Land continued to conduct experiments related to color perception.

Following Land's death in 1991, his heirs donated the Institute building and its endowment to Harvard. Harvard soon instituted the Fellows program as the organizing principle. The original building was sold to real estate developers in 2024.

== Rowland Fellows ==
The flagship program at the Rowland Institute is the Fellows Program. The program supports early career experimental scientists. Rowland Fellows receive funding for salary and research expenses and are allocated their own laboratory space. The Rowland Institute also provides technical support from permanent expert staff. The Fellowship lasts for five years, with continuation past two years contingent on a favorable internal review.

== Notable members and alumni ==
- Howard Berg - biophysicist noted for his work on the motility of the bacterium Escherichia coli (E. coli)
- Steven Block - pioneered the use of optical tweezers to study step dynamics of kinesin and RNA polymerase on DNA templates
- Colleen Cavanaugh - microbiologist recognized for her studies of hydrothermal vent ecosystems
- Donald A. Glaser - physicist, neurobiologist, and winner of the 1960 Nobel Prize in Physics for inventing the bubble chamber
- Jene Golovchenko - physicist noted for his work on materials for whole genome sequencing
- Lene Hau - physicist noted for her work on Bose–Einstein condensate, and ultracold atomic system optics
- Winfield Hill - co-authored the popular text The Art of Electronics with Harvard Physicist Paul Horowitz

== Past directors ==
- Edwin H. Land: 1980 - 1992
- Phil Dubois: 1992 - 1997
- Michael Burns: 1998 - 2002
- Frans Spaepen: 2002 - 2013
- Cynthia Friend: 2013 - 2019
- Andrew Murray: 2020–present
