= Winfield-Hill =

Winfield-Hill is a surname. Notable people with the surname include:

- Courtney Winfield-Hill (born 1987), Australian cricketer
- Lauren Winfield-Hill (born 1990), English cricketer

== See also ==
- Winfield Hill
