= Aarhus Faculty of Science and Technology =

Science and Technology is a faculty at Aarhus University. Science and Technology offers sixteen BSc degree programmes, eight BEng degree programmes (Professional bachelor's degrees) and twenty-eight MSc degree programmes, nine of which are MEng degree programmes. ST also offers a small number of further and continuing education programmes. Niels Chr. Nielsen is the dean of Science and Technology.

The teaching is organised in three schools: the Aarhus School of Science (ASOS) for the science degree programmes, the Aarhus University School of Engineering (ASE) for the engineering degree programmes, and the Graduate School of Science and Technology (GSST) for the PhD degree programmes.

The faculty consists of twelve departments, three schools, a major interdisciplinary centre (iNANO), a number of larger and smaller centres, and two national centres (DCA – Danish Centre for Food and Agriculture and DCE – Danish Centre for Environment and Energy).

Science and Technology was established on 1 January 2011 by amalgamating the former Faculty of Science, Faculty of Agricultural Sciences and National Environmental Research Institute of Denmark (NERI).

As of 1 January 2012, ST also merged with the Engineering College of Aarhus, which is now a school under Science and Technology responsible for study programmes and educational activities for the BEng and MEng degrees.

Science and Technology is also responsible for four of the university’s museums, with 80,000 visitors annually.

== Departments and centers at Science and Technology, Aarhus University ==
- Department of Agroecology
- Department of Bioscience
- Department of Computer Science
- Department of Physics and Astronomy
- Department of Food Science
- Department of Geoscience
- Department of Animal Science
- Department of Engineering
- Department of Chemistry
- Department of Mathematics
- Department of Environmental Science
- Department of Molecular Biology and Genetics
- Aarhus University School of Engineering
- DCA - Danish Centre for Food and Agriculture
- DCE - Danish Centre for Environment and Energy
- iNANO - Interdisciplinary Nanoscience Center
- Bioinformatics Research Center, BIRC
- Centre for Carbohydrate Recognition and Signalling
- Centre for Catalysis
- Centre for DNA Nanotechnology, CDNA
- Centre for Insoluble Protein Structures, inSPIN
- Centre for Massive Data Algorithmics, MADALGO
- Centre for mRNP Biogenesis and Metabolism
- Centre for Oxygen Microscopy and Imaging, COMI
- Centre for Pervasive Computing
- Centre for Quantum geometry of Moduli Spaces, QGM
- Centre for Science Education, CSE
- Centre for Scientific Computing Aarhus, CSC-AA
- Centre for Structural Biology
- Centre for Theoretical Chemistry, LCTC
- Centre for Theory in Natural Science, CTN
- Centre for the Topology and Quantization of Moduli Spaces, CTQM
- Centre for AMS 14C Dating
- Centre for Applied Sciences, CTK
- Centre for Tropical Ecosystems Research, cenTER
- Danish Centre for Molecular Gerontology
- Danish Centre for Transgenic Mice
- Danish Quantum Optics Center, QUANTOP Department of ChemistryDepartment of Earth Sciences Department of Molecular BiologyDepartment of Sport Science Foundations in Cryptology and Security, FICS
- Institute for Storage Ring Facilities Aarhus, ISA
- Instrument Centre for CERN, ICE
- Instrument Centre for Solid-State NMR Spectroscopy
- Interdisciplinary Nanoscience Center, iNANO
- Nordic Laboratory for Luminescence dating, NLL
- PUMKIN - Membrane pumps in cells and disease
- Quantum Mechanics for Large Molecular Systems
- Stellar Astrophysics Center
- Theoretical Centre for Quantum System Research, LCT
- The T.N. Thiele Centre for Applied Mathematics in Natural Science
