= George Ledlie Prize =

The George Ledlie Prize is awarded by the "President and Fellows of Harvard College" for contributions to science.

== George Ledlie ==
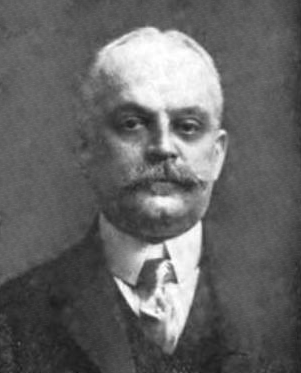
George Ledlie

George Hees Ledlie was born at Palatine Bridge, New York and attended private schools and colleges to prepare for Harvard, from where he graduated in 1884. In 1909 he reported to Harvard in a hand-written note that his full name had become George Ledlie – thus dropping his middle name Hees, the maiden name of his mother. Ledlie was a St. Louis and New York newspaper executive and an associate of publisher Joseph Pulitzer. George (Hees) Ledlie died on April 16, 1927, and the Harvard George Ledlie Prize became a bequest that year.

As a philanthropist, Ledlie donated an amount to Harvard, with the following conditions: "Bequest of George Ledlie, 1884, the net income to be paid not oftener than once in every two years as a prize to a person in any way connected with said University, who, in the judgement of said University since the last awarding of the said prize, has by research, discovery or otherwise made the most valuable contribution to science, or in any way for the benefit of mankind, ... and known as the George Ledlie Prize." The amount of this initial bequest was $1,000, and it has varied little with time. The prize is sought not for its monetary value, but for its recognition of the significance of scientific work carried out by the recipient. Thomas Weller, 1954 Nobel Prize winner for his research into polio, said of his Ledlie Award: "In 1963 in recognition of my isolation of the CMV and rubella viruses I was greatly pleased by the award by Harvard of the George Ledlie prize, an award given every two years to the Harvard faculty member considered to have made the major contribution to human welfare."

Robert Burns Woodward, Morris Loeb Professor of Chemistry, as the University's "leading contributor to science and the benefit of mankind," was the first person awarded the newly established George Ledlie Prize. It was given based on his research into the synthesis of quinine, and analyses and syntheses of increasingly complicated molecules, including cholesterol, cortisone, lysergic acid (LSD), strychnine, reserpine, and chlorophyll. The Ledlie Prize has been awarded in fields as diverse as chemistry, entomology, sociology, education, physics, and molecular biology. Over the years it has gained prestige as an award, and is prized by members of the Harvard faculty. Upon receipt of her Ledlie Prize, physicist Lene Hau explained her reaction in these terms: “I am very honored to receive the prize. It is really wonderful to receive this kind of recognition from your home institution,”. Psychologist Howard Gardner, winner of the 1999-2000 Ledlie stated that: "It’s especially heartwarming when an institution you identify with selects you as somebody they think well of."

== Past winners ==
Past winners of the Ledlie Award have included:

- Elias James Corey: For highly original development of the logic of Chemical Synthesis,and new methods for the construction of complex molecules – later also recognized by the award of the 1990 Nobel Prize in Chemistry.
- Thomas Huckle Weller: for growing polio virus in tissue culture,
- Gerald Gabrielse: for his "stunning" scientific accomplishment of creating and observing antimatter
- Sara Lawrence-Lightfoot: for portraiture, an approach to social science methodology that bridges the realms of aesthetics and empiricism
- Douglas Melton: for stem cell research regarding the genes, cells, and tissues that direct pancreatic organogenesis
- Mark Ptashne: for the study of repressor molecules in cellular genetic function
- Stephen C. Harrison: for the study of human tumor viruses and the proteins involved in infection by AIDS viruses,
- Lene Vestergaard Hau: for research using a Bose-Einstein Condensate to slow light, which is expected to improve fiber optics and quantum computing
- Judah Folkman: for research focused on the study of angiogenesis to prevent and treat cancer and other diseases
- Carroll M. Williams: for research on the juvenile hormone in insects
- L. Mahadevan: for research that focuses on the science of everyday things and solving such seemingly-mundane puzzles as the wrinkling of skin, the flutter of flags, the crumpling of paper, how the Venus flytrap snaps up its prey etc.
- Michael B. McElroy: for research on planetary atmospheres, oceanography, stratospheric ozone depletion, air quality, climate change, and carbon dioxide budgets
