= John Martin Kolinski =

American applied physicist

Professor John Martin Kolinski
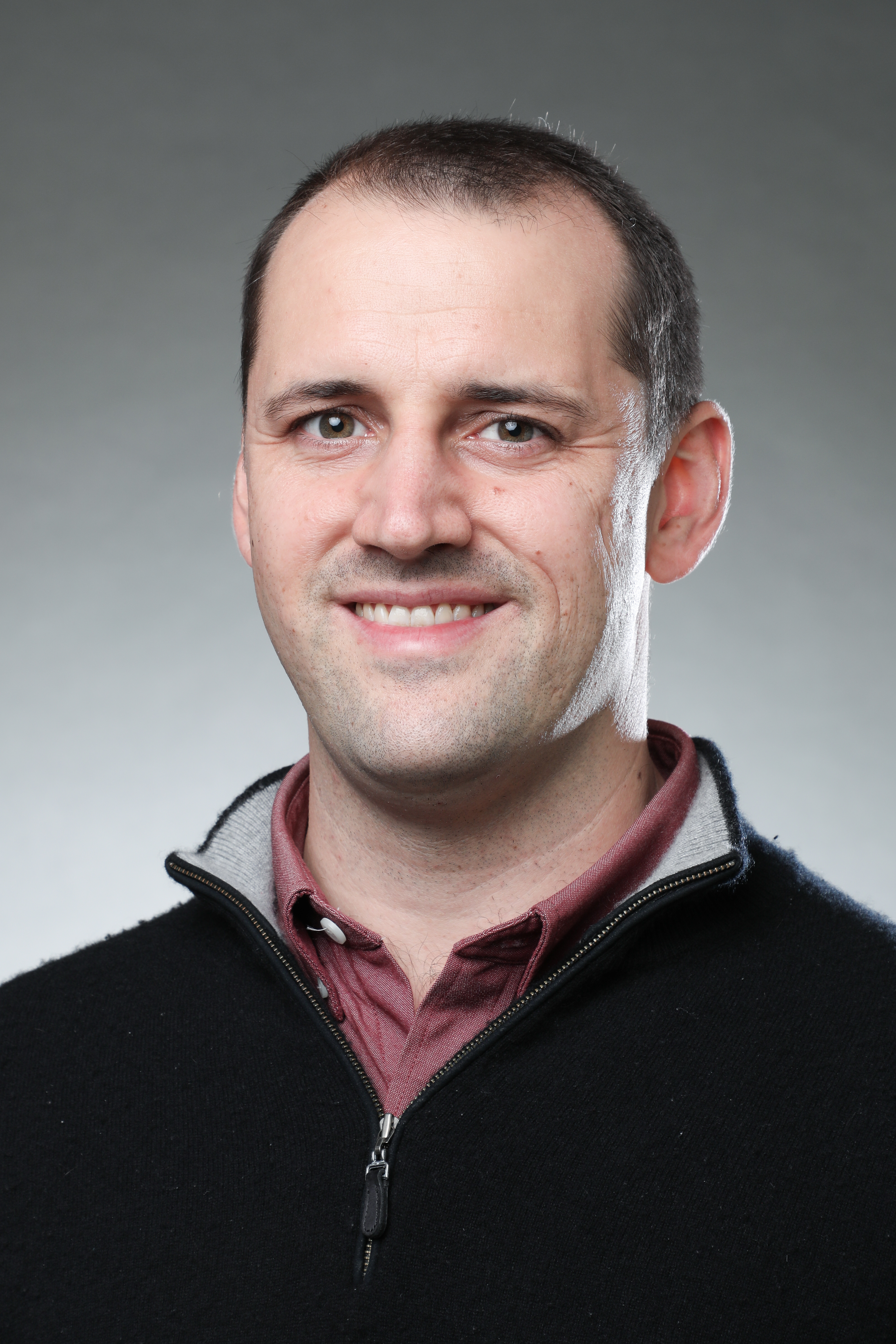
- John Kolinski in 2020
- Born: 1984 (age 41–42)
- Citizenship: United States
- Known for: Droplet impacts Fracture mechanics High-speed experimental methods

Academic background
- Education: Engineering mechanics Mathematics; Applied physics
- Alma mater: University of Illinois at Urbana–Champaign; Harvard University
- Thesis: The role of air in droplet impact on a smooth, solid surface (2013)
- Doctoral advisor: Lakshminarayanan Mahadevan; Shmuel Rubinstein
- Other advisors: Eran Sharon; Jay Fineberg

Academic work
- Discipline: Physics
- Sub-discipline: Applied physics
- Institutions: EPFL (École Polytechnique Fédérale de Lausanne)
- Notable students: Wassim Dhaouadi
- Main interests: High-speed imaging Microscopy; Fracture mechanics
- Website: https://www.epfl.ch/labs/emsi

John Martin Kolinski (born 1984) is an American engineer. He is a professor at EPFL (École Polytechnique Fédérale de Lausanne) and the head of the Laboratory of Engineering Mechanics of Soft Interfaces (EMSI) at EPFL's School of Engineering.

== Career ==
Kolinski studied both engineering mechanics and mathematics at the University of Illinois at Urbana–Champaign and graduated with bachelor's degrees in both subjects in 2008, before earning a master's degree in applied mathematics (Sc.M.) and a PhD in applied physics from Harvard University, in 2010 and 2013, respectively. His PhD thesis on "The role of air in droplet impact on a smooth, solid surface" was supervised by Lakshminarayanan Mahadevan and Shmuel Rubinstein. Supported by a Fulbright-Israel post-doctoral fellowship, he moved in 2014 to Israel to work with Eran Sharon and Jay Fineberg at the Racah Institute of Physics at the Hebrew University of Jerusalem. There he studied the inter-facial instabilities in fluid and solid systems such as water bells and the fracture of hydrogels.

Since May 2017, Kolinski has been a Tenure Track Assistant Professor at EPFL and the head of the Laboratory of Engineering Mechanics of Soft Interfaces (EMSI) at EPFL's School of Engineering.

== Research ==
Kolinski's research is invested into interfacial mechanics such as the understanding how objects break (fracture mechanics), and how wet objects dry and how dry objects wet (capillary phenomena at complex interfaces). For the study of theses phenomena he adapts and develops new experimental methods, such as the virtual frame technique.

While at his laboratory, his former student Wassim Dhaouadi solved a long-standing problem in physics, the Bretherton's buoyant bubble. Dhaouadi was awarded the EPFL award (2018) and was named one of JCI 10 outstanding persons of the year.

His research has been covered in news outlets such as New Atlas, Technology Review, Science Daily, Phys.org, SciTechDaily.

== Distinctions ==
Kolinski is a member of the American Physical Society, the Society for Experimental Mechanics, The Society for Engineering Science, The Optical Society, and European Mechanics Society (Euromech).

== Selected works ==
- Kolinski, John M.; Rubinstein, Shmuel M.; Mandre, Shreyas; Brenner, Michael P.; Weitz, David A.; Mahadevan, L. (2012). "Skating on a Film of Air: Drops Impacting on a Surface". Physical Review Letters. 108 (7) 074503. arXiv:1110.3351. Bibcode:2012PhRvL.108g4503K. doi:10.1103/PhysRevLett.108.074503. PMID 22401209. S2CID 17061794.
- Kolinski, J. M.; Mahadevan, L.; Rubinstein, S. M. (2014). "Drops can bounce from perfectly hydrophilic surfaces". EPL (Europhysics Letters). 108 (2) 24001. Bibcode:2014EL....10824001K. doi:10.1209/0295-5075/108/24001. S2CID 14715264.
- Kolinski, John M.; Mahadevan, L.; Rubinstein, Shmuel M. (2014). "Lift-Off Instability During the Impact of a Drop on a Solid Surface". Physical Review Letters. 112 (13) 134501. Bibcode:2014PhRvL.112m4501K. doi:10.1103/PhysRevLett.112.134501. PMID 24745426. S2CID 15918663.
- Kolinski, John M.; Aussillous, Pascale; Mahadevan, L. (2009). "Shape and Motion of a Ruck in a Rug". Physical Review Letters. 103 (17) 174302. arXiv:0906.4089. Bibcode:2009PhRvL.103q4302K. doi:10.1103/PhysRevLett.103.174302. PMID 19905761. S2CID 17172052.
- Jia, Haiyan; Mailand, Erik; Zhou, Jiangtao; Huang, Zhangjun; Dietler, Giovanni; Kolinski, John M.; Wang, Xinling; Sakar, Mahmut Selman (2019). "Universal Soft Robotic Microgripper" (PDF). Small. 15 (4) e1803870. doi:10.1002/smll.201803870. PMID 30488616. S2CID 54124986.
- Aharoni, Hillel; Kolinski, John M.; Moshe, Michael; Meirzada, Idan; Sharon, Eran (2016). "Internal Stresses Lead to Net Forces and Torques on Extended Elastic Bodies". Physical Review Letters. 117 (12) 124101. Bibcode:2016PhRvL.117l4101A. doi:10.1103/PhysRevLett.117.124101. PMID 27689279.
- Kolvin, Itamar; Kolinski, John M.; Gong, Jian Ping; Fineberg, Jay (2018). "How Supertough Gels Break". Physical Review Letters. 121 (13) 135501. arXiv:1808.07902. Bibcode:2018PhRvL.121m5501K. doi:10.1103/PhysRevLett.121.135501. PMID 30312088. S2CID 206317454.
- Dhaouadi, Wassim; Kolinski, John M. (2019). "Bretherton's buoyant bubble". Physical Review Fluids. 4 (12) 123601. Bibcode:2019PhRvF...4l3601D. doi:10.1103/PhysRevFluids.4.123601. S2CID 214153009.
