= Jene Golovchenko =

American physicist (1946–2018)

Jene A. Golovchenko (1946 – November 13, 2018) was an American physicist. He was born in 1946, and received his PhD in physics in 1972, from Rensselaer Polytechnic Institute. He completed three sets of postdoctoral studies at Aarhus University and spent several years in industry as a Distinguished Member of the Technical Staff at Bell Laboratories in Murray Hill, NJ. His initial interests were in condensed matter physics, nuclear physics, and materials science.

He had a broad research career, encompassing research posts at Harvard University, Aarhus University in Denmark, and also in industry, at Bell Labs, in facilities at Brookhaven National Laboratory and Lawrence Livermore National Laboratory, and at CERN in Geneva, Switzerland. He was also a member of the Rowland Institute for Science, an interdisciplinary, non-profit, basic research institute in Cambridge MA. A prolific writer, he had produced over 200 papers on a diverse range of topics, and collaborated with many other scientists on a very broad range of experimental research. In 1994, work with Lene Hau and team produced a device called "the candlestick", designed to produce atoms at large emission rates under high vacuum conditions, whilst retaining a stable operation. This device is still used, based on their original design, in other labs dealing with low temperature physics. With Daniel Branton and Haibing Peng he had worked to develop several devices pertaining to the construction of various types of carbon nanotubes.

He was most recently Rumford Professor of Physics and Gordon Mckay Professor of Applied Physics at Harvard, and led The Harvard Nanopore Group with Professor Daniel Branton. His interests lay in developing advanced methods of physics, materials, and molecular science to achieve very rapid sequencing of the entire human genome. Most recently he was involved with the Oxford Nanopore Group as it seeks to develop graphene and other solid state materials to achieve this whole genome sequencing. He died on November 13, 2018.

== Nanopore publications ==
- "Graphene as a subnanometre trans-electrode membrane" : S. Garaj, W. Hubbard, A. Reina, J. Kong, D. Branton, J. A. Golovchenko Journal: Nature 467, 190–193, 2010
- "Embedding a carbon nanotube across the diameter of a solid state nanopore" : E. S. Sadki, S. Garaj, D. Vlassarev, J. A. Golovchenko, D. Branton Journal: Journal of Vacuum Science & Technology B: Microelectronics and Nanometer Structures, vol. 29, 2011
- "An ice lithography instrument" : Anpan Han, John Chervinsky, Daniel Branton, J. A. Golovchenko Journal: Review of Scientific Instruments - REV SCI INSTR, vol. 82, 2011
- "Origins and Consequences of Velocity Fluctuations during DNA Passage through a Nanopore" : Bo Lu, Fernando Albertorio, David P. Hoogerheide, Jene A. Golovchenko Journal: Biophysical Journal - BIOPHYS J, vol. 101, pp. 70–79, 2011
- "Thermal activation and saturation of ion beam sculpting" : David P. Hoogerheide, H. Bola George, Jene A. Golovchenko, Michael J. Aziz Journal: Journal of Applied Physics - J APPL PHYS, vol. 109, no. 7, pp. 4312–074312, 2011

== Earlier publications ==
- Near Resonant Spatial Images of Confined Bose-Einstein Condensates in the 4-Dee Magnetic Bottle : Lene Vestergaard Hau, B. D. Busch, Chien Liu, Zachary Dutton, Michael M. Burns, J. A. Golovchenko Phys. Rev. A 58, R54-R57 (1998).
- Cold Atoms and Creation of New States of Matter: Bose-Einstein Condensates, Kapitza States, and '2D Magnetic Hydrogen Atoms :Lene Vestergaard Hau, B. D. Busch, Chien Liu, Michael M. Burns, J. A. Golovchenko Photonic, Electronic and Atomic Collisions : Invited papers of the 20th International Conference of Electronic and Atomic Collisions (ICEAC) Vienna, Austria, July 23–29, 1997) F. Aumayr and H.P. Winter, editors (World Scientific, Singapore 1998), pp. 41–50.
- Supersymmetry and the Binding of a Magnetic Atom to a Filamentary Current : Lene Vestergaard Hau, J. A. Golovchenko, and Michael M. Burns Phys. Rev. Lett. 74, 3138-3140 (1995).
- A new atomic beam source: The "candlestick" : Lene Vestergaard Hau, J. A. Golovchenko, and Michael M. Burns Rev. Sci. Instrum. 65, 3746-3750 (1994)
- Bound states of guided matter waves: An atom and a charged wire : Lene Vestergaard Hau, Michael M. Burns, and J. A. Golovchenko Phys. Rev. A 45, 6468-6478 (1992).
