= Samuel Friedman Foundation =

Non-profit organisation

The Samuel Friedman Foundation was established in 1956 by Samuel Friedman, in Buffalo, New York. A later branch of the foundation was set up in Los Angeles at UCLA. Friedman, who was born in Romania on January 1, 1919, was a survivor of concentration camps at both Dachau and Auschwitz, and was eventually liberated by United States forces. After some time as a displaced person, he emigrated to the United States, eventually owned several restaurants in Niagara Falls, and became known as a successful New York businessman. In 1956, he established the Samuel Friedman Foundation to support and strengthen Jewish educational initiatives and programs. These projects have involved the local community in Buffalo, New York, and have continued after Samuel Friedman's death from a cardiac arrest. The foundation maintains his original intention through the establishment of projects such as The Samuel Friedman Library in the Institute for Jewish Thought and Heritage at the University of Buffalo. It also contributed significantly to the establishment of the Hineni Endowment Campaign at the Kadimah School in Buffalo. The Samuel Friedman Foundation was termed a "medium"-sized grant giver in a report entitled "Profile of Foundation Giving in Western New York" prepared for the Western New York Grantmakers Association by the University at Buffalo Regional Institute. It remains a non-profit organization, noted for its contributions to the general Buffalo community, and for its Rescue Award, given annually.

== Rescue Award ==
In 1984, Friedman created the Samuel Friedman (Rescue) Award as a tribute to the Danish people for the rescue of Jews in October 1943. This award is given annually from the Foundation offices at UCLA. In 1985, the Los Angeles Times reported that two professors would be awarded the Rescue Award: Uffe Haagerup, professor of mathematics at the University of Odense; and Arne Noe Nygaard, Professor Emeritus of geology at the University of Copenhagen, on May 4 in ceremonies celebrating the 40th anniversary of Denmark's liberation from the Nazis.

Recipients of this award have included many Danes associated with education and academia:

- Gert D. Billing - University of Copenhagen
- Birgit H. Satir - Yeshiva University
- Klaus Bock - Carlsberg A/S
- Lene Hau - Harvard University
- Jens Norskov - Stanford University
