= Lene Hau =

Danish physicist and educator (born 1959)

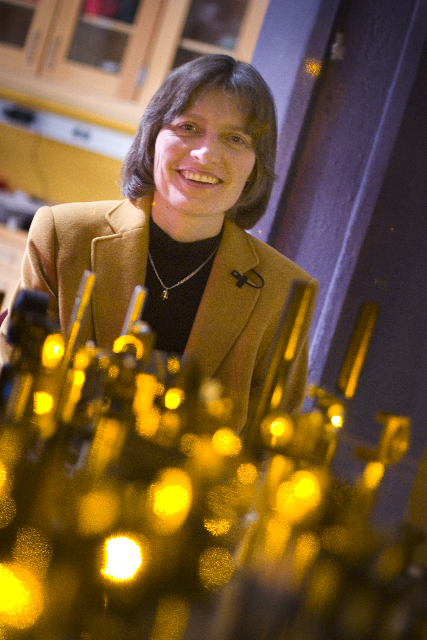
- Lene Hau in her laboratory at Harvard, 2007
- Born: November 13, 1959 (age 67); Vejle, Denmark
- Education: Aarhus University
- Known for: Slow light, Bose–Einstein condensates, nanotechnology, quantum optics
- Awards: Ole Rømer Medal; George Ledlie Prize; MacArthur Fellowship; Rigmor and Carl Holst-Knudsen Award for Scientific Research
- Scientific career
- Fields: Physics, nanotechnology
- Workplaces: Harvard University; Rowland Institute for Science
- Doctoral advisor: Jens Ulrik Andersen
- Doctoral students: Naomi Ginsberg, Christopher Slowe, Zachary Dutton

Lene Vestergaard Hau (Danish: [ˈle̝ːnə ˈvestɐˌkɒˀ ˈhɑw]; born November 13, 1959) is a Danish physicist and educator. She is the Mallinckrodt Professor of Physics and of Applied Physics at Harvard University.

In 1999, she led a Harvard University team that, by use of a Bose–Einstein condensate, succeeded in slowing a beam of light to about 17 metres per second, and, in 2001, was able to stop a beam completely. Later work based on these experiments led to the transfer of light to matter, then from matter back into light, a process with important implications for quantum encryption and quantum computing. More recent work has focused on novel interactions between ultracold atoms and nanoscopic-scale systems. In addition to teaching physics and applied physics, she has taught Energy Science at Harvard, involving photovoltaic cells, nuclear power, batteries, and photosynthesis.

== Early life, family and education ==
Hau was born in Vejle, Denmark. She earned her bachelor's degree in mathematics in 1984 at the University of Aarhus in Denmark at the age of 24. Hau continued her studies there, receiving her master's degree in physics two years later.

For her doctoral studies in quantum theory, Hau worked on ideas similar to those involved in fibre optic cables carrying light, but her work involved strings of atoms in a silicon crystal carrying electrons. While working towards her doctorate, Hau spent seven months at CERN, the European Laboratory for Particle Physics near Geneva. She received her doctorate from the University of Aarhus in 1991, but by then her research interests had shifted.

== Career ==
In 1991, she joined the Rowland Institute for Science at Cambridge, Massachusetts as a scientific staff member, beginning to explore the possibilities of slow light and cold atoms. In 1999, at the age of 40, Hau accepted a two-year appointment as a postdoctoral fellow at Harvard University. Her formalized training is in theoretical physics, but her interest moved to experimental research in an effort to create a new form of matter known as a Bose–Einstein condensate. "Hau applied to the National Science Foundation for funds to make a batch of this condensate but was rejected on the grounds that she was a theorist for whom such experiments would be too difficult to do." Undeterred, she gained alternative funding and became one of the first handful of physicists to create such a condensate. In September 1999, she was appointed the Gordon Mckay Professor of Applied Physics and Professor of Physics at Harvard. She was also awarded tenure in 1999 and is now Mallinckrodt Professor of Physics and Applied Physics at Harvard. In 2001, she became the first person to stop light completely, using a Bose–Einstein condensate to achieve this. Since then, she has produced extensive research and new experimental work in electromagnetically induced transparency, various areas of quantum physics, photonics, and has contributed to the development of new quantum devices and novel nanoscale applications.

== Qubit transfer ==
Hau and her associates at Harvard University "have demonstrated exquisite control over light and matter in several experiments, but her experiment with 2 condensates is one of the most compelling". In 2006, they successfully transferred a qubit from light to a matter wave and back into light, again using Bose–Einstein condensates. Details of the experiment are discussed in the February 8, 2007, publication of the journal Nature. The experiment relies on the way that, according to quantum mechanics, atoms may behave as waves as well as particles. This enables atoms to do some counterintuitive things, such as passing through two openings at once. Within a Bose–Einstein condensate a light pulse is compressed by a factor of 50 million, without losing any of the information stored within it. In this Bose–Einstein condensate, information encoded in a light pulse can be transferred to the atom waves. Because all the atoms move coherently, the information does not dissolve into random noise. The light drives some of the cloud's roughly 1.8 million sodium atoms to enter into "quantum superposition" states, with a lower-energy component that stays put and a higher-energy component that travels between the two clouds. A second 'control' laser then writes the pulse shape into the atom's wave function. When this control beam is turned off, and the light pulse disappears, the 'matter copy' remains. Prior to this, researchers could not readily control optical information during its journey, except to amplify the signal to avoid fading. This experiment by Hau and her colleagues marked the first successful manipulation of coherent optical information. The new study is "a beautiful demonstration", says Irina Novikova, a physicist at the College of William and Mary in Williamsburg, VA. Before this result, she says, light storage was measured in milliseconds. "Here it's fractional seconds. It's a really dramatic time."

Of its potential, Hau said, "While the matter is traveling between the two Bose–Einstein condensates, we can trap it, potentially for minutes, and reshape it – change it – in whatever way we want. This novel form of quantum control could also have applications in the developing fields of quantum information processing and quantum cryptography." Of the developmental implications, "This feat, the sharing around of quantum information in light-form and in not just one but two atom-forms, offers great encouragement to those who hope to develop quantum computers," said Jeremy Bloxham, dean of science in the Faculty of Arts and Sciences. Hau was awarded the George Ledlie Prize for this work, Harvard's Provost Steven Hyman noting "her work is path-breaking. Her research blurs the boundaries between basic and applied science, draws on the talent and people of two Schools and several departments, and provides a literally glowing example of how taking daring intellectual risks leads to profound rewards."

== Cold atoms and nanoscale systems ==
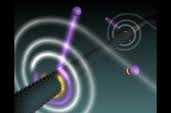
A captured atom is ripped apart as its electron is sucked into the nanotube

In 2009, Hau and team laser-cooled clouds of one million rubidium atoms to just a fraction of a degree above absolute zero. They then launched this millimeter-long atomic cloud towards a suspended carbon nanotube, located some two centimeters away and charged to hundreds of volts. The results were published in 2010, heralding new interactions between cold atoms and nanoscale systems. They observed that most atoms passed by, but approximately 10 per million were inescapably attracted, causing them to dramatically accelerate both in movement and in temperature. "At this point, the speeding atoms separate into an electron and an ion rotating in parallel around the nanowire, completing each orbit in just a few trillionths of a second. The electron eventually gets sucked into the nanotube via quantum tunneling, causing its companion ion to shoot away – repelled by the strong charge of the 300-volt nanotube – at a speed of roughly 26 kilometers per second, or 59,000 miles per hour." Atoms can rapidly disintegrate, without having to collide with each other, in this experiment. The team notes that this effect is not produced by gravity in black holes, as calculated for black holes in space, but by the high electrical charge in the nanotube. The experiment combines nanotechnology with cold atoms to demonstrate a new type of high-resolution, single-atom, chip-integrated detector that may ultimately resolve fringes from the interference of matter waves. The scientists also foresee a range of single-atom, fundamental studies made possible by their setup.

== Awards ==
- 1986-1989: Faculty of Sciences, University of Aarhus, Denmark – Research Fellowship
- 1988: Carlsberg Foundation, Denmark – Carlsberg Scholarship
- 1991: Rowland Institute – Gordon Mckay Professor of Applied Physics at Harvard and Principal Investigator for the Atom Cooling Group
- 2000: Top Danmark Foundation, Copenhagen – Year 2000 Award
- 2001: Samuel Friedman Foundation, University of California, Los Angeles – Samuel Friedman Rescue Award
- 2001: Honorary degree, Æreshåndværker Kjøbenhavns Håndværkerforening, in the presence of Her Majesty Queen Margrethe II of Denmark, Copenhagen
- 2001: Danish Natural Science Research Council – The Ole Rømer Medal
- 2001: Danish Physical Society – NKT Award
- 2001-2006: MacArthur Fellow 2001–2006 – Genius Grant
- 2004: American Association of Physics Teachers – Richtmyer Memorial Award
- 2008: George Ledlie Prize
- 2008: Rigmor and Carl Holst-Knudsen Award for Scientific Research
- 2010: Global Network of Danes Worldwide – "Årets Verdensdansker" (World Dane of the year) 2010 because she "emphatically and persistently has put Denmark on the world map".
- 2011: Carlsberg Foundation's Research Award from the Royal Danish Academy of Sciences and Letters

== Guest lectures ==
- 2004: Leon Pape Memorial Lecture
- 2003: Slow Light for the Annals of Improbable Research (AIR)
- 2008: Capital Science Lecture at Carnegie Institution for Science
- 2010: H.C. Ørsted Lectureship
- 2018: Lise Meitner Distinguished Lecturer
- 2019: Dirac Medal and Lecture, the University of New South Wales

== Honorary positions and memberships ==
- Royal Danish Academy of Sciences and Letters – honorary appointment
- 2008: Royal Swedish Academy of Sciences – foreign member
- 2009: American Academy of Arts and Sciences – member
- 2009: American Association for the Advancement of Science (AAAS) – fellow
- 2010: United States Department of Defense – National Security Science and Engineering Faculty Fellow
- 2011: Aarhus Universitet – honorary alum

== Publications ==
- Lene Vestergaard Hau, "Physics for the 21st Century" Annenberg Foundation Manipulating Light, Unit 7
- Anne Goodsell, Trygve Ristroph, J. A. Golovchenko, and Lene Vestergaard Hau, Field ionization of cold atoms near the wall of a single carbon nanotube (2010)
- Rui Zhang, Sean R. Garner, and Lene Vestergaard Hau, Creation of long-term coherent optical memory via controlled nonlinear interactions in Bose–Einstein condensates (2009)
- Naomi S. Ginsberg, Sean R. Garner, and Lene Vestergaard Hau, Coherent control of optical information with matter wave dynamics (2007).
- Naomi S. Ginsberg, Joachim Brand, Lene Vestergaard Hau, Observation of Hybrid Soliton Vortex-Ring Structures in Bose–Einstein Condensates (2005).
- Chien Liu, Zachary Dutton, Cyrus H. Behroozi, Lene Vestergaard Hau, Observation of coherent optical information storage in an atomic medium using halted light pulses
- Lene Vestergaard Hau, S. E. Harris, Zachary Dutton, Cyrus H. Behroozi, Light speed reduction to 17 metres per second in an ultracold atomic gas
- Lene Vestergaard Hau, Quantum Optics: Slowing single photons
- Brian Murphy and Lene Vestergaard Hau, Electro-optical nanotraps for neutral atoms,
- Lene Vestergaard Hau, Optical information processing in Bose–Einstein condensates,
- Lene Vestergaard Hau, Quantum physics – Tangled memories,
- Lene Vestergaard Hau, Nonlinear optics: Shocking superfluids,
- Christopher Slowe, Laurent Vernac, Lene Vestergaard Hau, A High Flux Source of Cold Rubidium
- Christopher Slowe, Naomi S. Ginsberg, Trygve Ristroph, Anne Goodsell, and Lene Vestergaard Hau, Ultraslow Light & Bose–Einstein Condensates: Two-way Control with Coherent Light & Atom Fields
- Marin Soljacic, Elefterios Lidorikis, J. D. Joannopoulos, Lene Vestergaard Hau, Ultra Low-Power All-Optical Switching
- Trygve Ristroph, Anne Goodsell, J. A. Golovchenko, and Lene Vestergaard Hau, Detection and quantized conductance of neutral atoms near a charged carbon nanotube
- Zachary Dutton, Lene Vestergaard Hau, Storing and processing optical information with ultra-slow light in Bose–Einstein condensates
- Zachary Dutton, Naomi S. Ginsberg, Christopher Slowe, and Lene Vestergaard Hau, The Art of Taming Light: Ultra-slow and Stopped Light
- Lene Vestergaard Hau, Frozen Light
- Zachary Dutton, Michael Budde, Christopher Slowe, Lene Vestergaard Hau, Observation of quantum shock waves created with ultra-compressed slow light pulses in a Bose–Einstein Condensate
- Lene Vestergaard Hau, Taming Light with Cold Atoms Invited feature article. Published by the Institute for Physics, UK.
- B. D. Busch, Chien Liu, Z. Dutton, C. H. Behroozi, L. Vestergaard Hau, Observation of interaction dynamics in finite-temperature Bose condensed atom clouds
- C. Liu, B.D. Busch, Z. Dutton, and L. V. Hau, Anisotropic Expansion of Finite Temperature Bose Gases – Emergence of Interaction Effects between Condensed and Non-Condensed Atoms, Proceedings of the conference on New Directions in Atomic Physics, Cambridge, England, July 1998, eds. C. T. Whelan, R.M. Dreizler, J.H. Macek, and H.R.J Walters, (Plenum, 1999).
- Lene Hau, BEC and Light Speeds of 38 miles/hr: Proceedings of the Workshop on Bose–Einstein Condensation and Degenerate Fermi Gases, from Workshop on Bose–Einstein Condensation and Degenerate Fermi Gases Hau's talk: Podcast and image files.
- Lene Vestergaard Hau, B. D. Busch, Chien Liu, Zachary Dutton, Michael M. Burns, J. A. Golovchenko, Near Resonant Spatial Images of Confined Bose–Einstein Condensates in the 4-Dee Magnetic Bottle
- Lene Vestergaard Hau, B. D. Busch, Chien Liu, Michael M. Burns, J. A. Golovchenko, Cold Atoms and Creation of New States of Matter: Bose–Einstein Condensates, Kapitza States, and '2D Magnetic Hydrogen Atoms, (Photonic, Electronic and Atomic Collisions: Invited papers of the 20th International Conference of Electronic and Atomic Collisions (ICEAC) Vienna, Austria, July 23–29, 1997) F. Aumayr and H.P. Winter, editors
- Lene Vestergaard Hau, J. A. Golovchenko, and Michael M. Burns, Supersymmetry and the Binding of a Magnetic Atom to a Filamentary Current
- Lene Vestergaard Hau, J. A. Golovchenko, and Michael M. Burns, A new atomic beam source: The "candlestick"
- Lene Vestergaard Hau, Michael M. Burns, and J. A. Golovchenko, Bound states of guided matter waves: An atom and a charged wire
- "Absolute Zero and the Conquest of Cold"
- "Absolute Zero and the Conquest of Cold" Tom Schactman Pub Date: Dec. 1st, 1999 Publisher: Houghton Mifflin
