= Wassim Dhaouadi =

Tunisian engineer

- Citizenship: Tunisia
- Occupation: Engineer

Wassim Dhaouadi is a Tunisian mechanical engineer. He is known for having solved Bretherton's buoyant bubble problem in physics as an undergraduate at the EPFL (École Polytechnique Fédérale de Lausanne).

== Career and recognition ==
Dhaouadi studied mechanical engineering and received a BSc from EPFL in 2018 and a MSc from ETH Zurich in 2020. As a bachelor student in John Kolinski's laboratory at EPFL, Dhaouadi solved Bretherton's buoyant bubble problem, a long-standing problem in physics. By using an optical interference method, he was able to prove the existence and measure the physical properties of a thin liquid film that had been hypothesized by physicists to explain why air bubbles appear to get stuck in capillaries.

In 2020, Dhaouadi was named one of the ten Outstanding Young Persons in the World in the category of Academic Leadership by the Junior Chamber International. He was also awarded with the Sanford C. Bernstein & Co. Leadership and Ethics Award from Columbia Business School.

He currently works as an intern in NASA's Jet Propulsion Laboratory.
