= Stanley Autler =

American physicist (1922–1991)

Stanley Howard Autler (March 28, 1922 – October 16, 1991) was an American physicist.

After receiving bachelor's and master's degrees from the City College of New York, he was award his Ph.D. from Columbia University. Thereafter he joined the staff of Lincoln Laboratory at the Massachusetts Institute of Technology, where he performed research on low temperature physics, solid state physics and high magnetic field superconductivity. In 1955, he and Charles H. Townes demonstrated a new dynamic Stark effect, later known as the Autler–Townes effect. This occurs when "a microwave transition can be split into two components when one of the two levels involved in the transition is coupled to a third one by a strong RF field" (Picque and Pinard 1976).

Autler was a pioneer in the use of small superconducting solenoids with niobium wire, producing a 2.5 T field at a temperature of 4.2 K, then achieving 9.8 T at a temperature of 1.5 K. He may have been the first person to create an application for superconductivity when he used this magnetic field for a solid state maser. This led to widespread interest in the practical uses of superconducting magnets. In 1960, he filed for a patent for a superconducting magnet, which was awarded in 1965. In 1963, he was named head of the Low Temperature Physics section at the Westinghouse Research Laboratories.

He was married to his wife Kaja and the couple had a daughter Lilian who graduated from Yale University.
