= Michael McElroy (scientist) =

American scientist (1939–2026)

Michael Brendan McElroy (May 18, 1939 – January 8, 2026) was an Irish-born American scientist who was the Gilbert Butler Professor of Environmental Studies at Harvard University. His research initially revolved around the origin and evolution of the planets to an emphasis on effects of human activity on the global environment of the Earth, especially climate change.

== Life and career ==
Born in Ireland and raised in Northern Ireland originally, he was educated at Queen's University Belfast, receiving a B.Sc. in applied mathematics in 1960, and completing his Ph.D. in applied mathematics in 1962.

McElroy worked in atmospheric science at Harvard, and led atmospheric science and policy work. He headed Harvard University's Center for the Environment and chaired the Interfaculty Initiative on the Environment. In 1984 he won the George Ledlie prize for his work on planetary atmospheres. He served as Founding Chair of Harvard's Department of Earth and Planetary Sciences and has focused his research especially on effects of human activities on the global environment.

He recorded two audible books, The Modern Scholar: Global Warming, Global Threat (2004) and Fueling the Planet: The Past, Present, and Future of Energy (2009).

McElroy died on January 8, 2026, at the age of 86.

== Selected publications ==
- Energy: Perspectives, Problems, and Prospects. (2010) Oxford: Oxford University Press. ISBN 9780195386110
- The atmospheric environment : effects of human activity. (2002) Princeton: Princeton University Press. ISBN 9780691006918
- Energizing China: Reconciling Environmental Protection and Economic Growth, co-authored with Chris P. Nielsen and Peter Lydon. (1998). Harvard University Center for the Environment, China Project. ISBN 978-0674253292
- A 1984 paper he co-authored with Steven Wofsy and Michael J. Prather on potential non-linear destruction of the ozone layer helped persuade the United States Environmental Protection Agency to carry out a risk assessme nt of chlorofluorocarbons that laid the groundwork for the negotiation of the Montreal Protocol.
- McElroy, Michael B.; Wofsy, Steven C.; Penner, Joyce E.; McConnell, John C. (January 1, 1974). "Atmospheric Ozone: Possible Impact of Stratospheric Aviation". Journal of the Atmospheric Sciences. 31 (1): 287–304. Bibcode:1974JAtS...31..287M. doi:10.1175/1520-0469(1974)031<0287:AOPIOS>2.0.CO;2. ISSN 0022-4928.

== Honors ==
- James B. Macelwane Medal (1968)
- Fellow of the American Geophysical Union (elected 1971)
- American Academy of Arts and Sciences (elected 1972)
- Royal Irish Academy (elected Honorary Member, Science 2009]
- American Geophysical Union 2024 William Bowie Medal
