= Sean R. Garner =

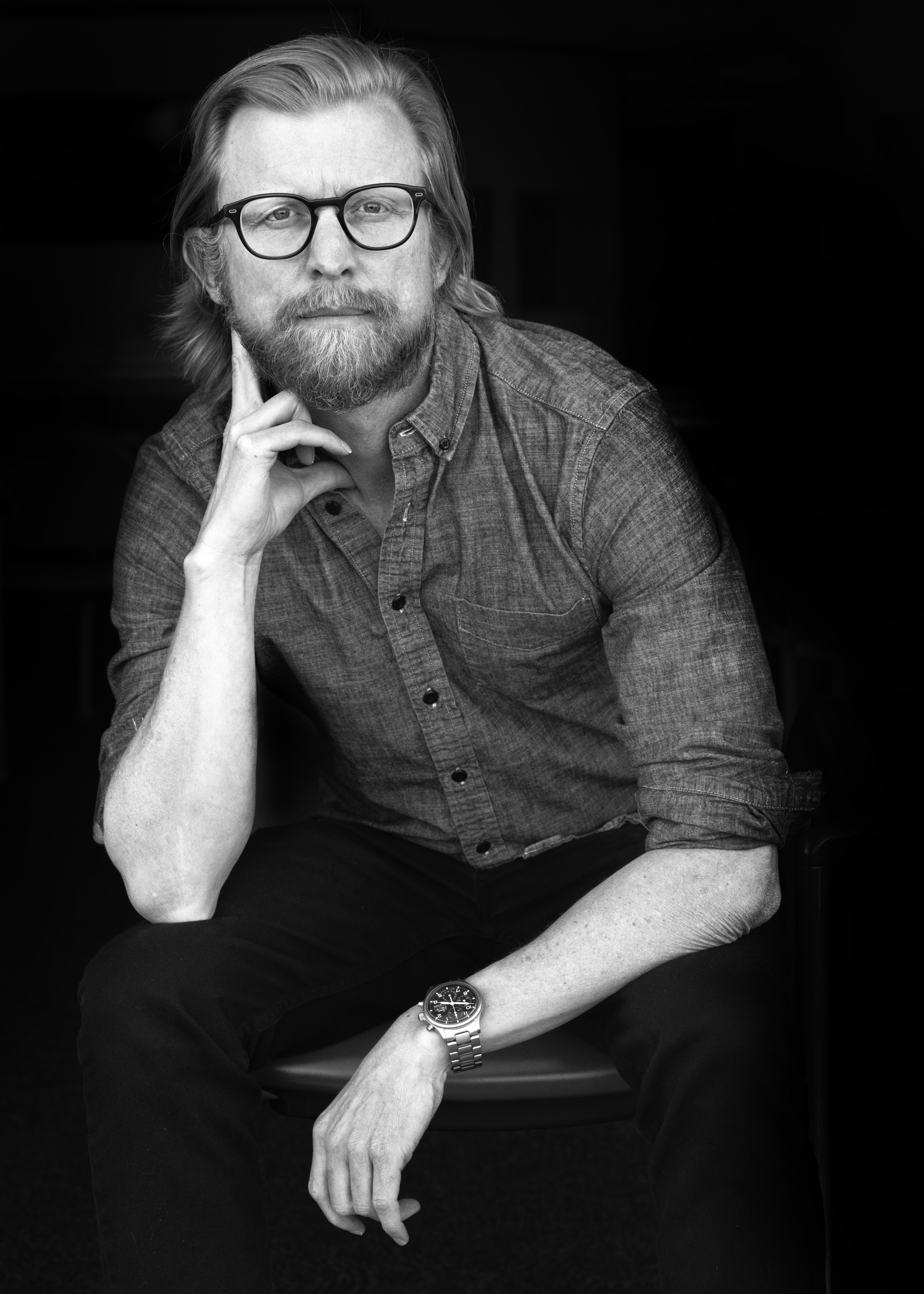
Sean Garner at PARC in 2020

Sean R. Garner is a physicist currently working on a diverse suite of projects for Palo Alto Research Center (PARC), in San Francisco, CA. Garner received his BA, Mathematics and BS, Physics from University of California, Santa Cruz in 1999, and completed his PhD in physics in 2005 at Cornell University. His thesis was titled "Force-Gradient Detection of Nuclear Magnetic Resonance", and Prof. John A. Marohn was his Doctoral Advisor. He then spent 3 years as a Postdoctoral Fellow at Harvard University, School of Engineering and Applied Sciences researching ultra-slow and stopped light in Bose-Einstein Condensates with Prof. Lene Vestergaard Hau. Garner was the second author on the groundbreaking paper "Coherent control of optical information with matter wave dynamics," which appeared on the cover of Nature, and detailed the first experimental verification "that a slow light pulse can be stopped and stored in one Bose–Einstein condensate and subsequently revived from a totally different condensate, 160 micrometer away; information is transferred through conversion of the optical pulse into a travelling matter wave."

== Career ==
After completing his post-doctoral work, Garner moved to California, to take up the position of Area Manager of PARC San Francisco Research Division in 2009. This allowed him to undertake further work in photovoltaics, sustainable engineering and other technologies designed to innovate PARC products to be "environmentally friendly". PARC currently conducts research into "clean technology", user interface design, sensemaking, ubiquitous computing and context-aware systems, large-area electronics, and model-based control and optimization in embedded, intelligent systems. Garner is currently managing the Energy Systems group in the Hardware Systems Laboratory, and has a focus on CleanTech, of which PARC is a major sponsor. Garner's current work is focussed on advanced cooling technologies for next-generation air conditioning and refrigeration; atmospheric CO_{2} capture for renewable, infrastructure-compatible liquid fuels; and enhanced geothermal systems. He has presented many papers at conferences and will be discussing PARC's SENSOR: (Smart Embedded Network of Sensors with Optical Readout) at the ARPA-E Energy Innovation Summit.

== Publications ==
- Creation of long-term coherent optical memory via controlled nonlinear interactions in Bose-Einstein condensates : Rui Zhang, Sean R. Garner, and Lene Vestergaard Hau
- Coherent control of optical information with matter wave dynamics Naomi S. Ginsberg, Sean R. Garner, and Lene Vestergaard Hau
- Force-gradient detected nuclear magnetic resonance : Garner, Sean R.; Kuehn, Seppe; Dawlaty, Jahan M.; Jenkins, Neil E.; Marohn, John A.
- An all-digital cantilever controller for MRFM and scanned probe microscopy using a combined DSP/FPGA design : D. de Roover, L. M. Porter II, A. Emami-Naeni, J. A. Marohn, S. Kuehn, S. Garner, and D. D. Smith

== PARC Publications ==
- Acoustic power recovery system for thermoacoustic cooling : TechConnect World 2012 18 June 2012
- Flexible printed sensor tape based on solution processed materials : 23rd Annual Meeting of the IEEE Photonics Society 7 November 2010
- Pressure sensors for printed blast dosimeters : IEEE Sensors 2010 1 November 2010
- Inkjet-patterned, organic complementary circuits integrated with polymer mechanical sensors : Invited paper in ECS Transactions 2010
- Flexible and printed electronics for sensors, displays and photovoltaics : International Workshop on Flexible and Printed Electronics 8 September 2010
- Inkjet-printed, organic complementary circuits integrated with polymer mechanical sensors : ACS Meeting 2010 25 March 2010
- Printed electronics - the impact on electronic displays and sensor devices : ICFPE 2009 10 November 2009
- Flexible printed sensor tape for diagnostics of mild traumatic brain injury : IDTechEx Printed Electronics Asia 30 September 2009
