= Electromagnetically induced grating =

Electromagnetically induced grating (EIG) is an optical interference phenomenon where an interference pattern is used to build a dynamic spatial diffraction grating in matter. EIGs are dynamically created by light interference on optically resonant materials and rely on population inversion and/or optical coherence properties of the material. They were first demonstrated with population gratings on atoms. EIGs can be used for purposes of atomic/molecular velocimetry, to probe the material optical properties such as coherence and population life-times, and switching and routing of light. Related but different effects are thermally induced gratings and photolithography gratings.

== Writing, reading and phase-matching conditions for EIG diffraction ==
Figure 1: Writing and reading an EIG

Figure 1 shows a possible beam configuration to write and read an EIG. The period of the grating is controlled by the angle $\theta$. The writing and reading frequencies are not necessarily the same. E_{B} is referred as the "backward" reading beam and E_{R} is the signal obtained by diffraction on the grating.

The phase-matching conditions for the EIG for the plane-wave approximation is given by the simple geometric relation:

$\sin\beta=n \Bigl(\frac{\omega_1}{\omega_2}\Bigr) \sin(\theta/2)$,

where the angles are given according to Fig. 2, $\omega_1$ and $\omega_2$ are the frequencies of the writing (W, W') and reading beam (R), respectively, and n is the effective index of refraction of the medium.

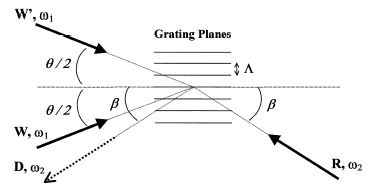
Figure 2: Phase matching conditions for EIG diffraction

== Types of EIG ==
Figure 3: Difference between a "matter grating" and a "population grating". The smileys :-( and :-) represent ground and optically excited atoms, respectively.

=== Matter gratings ===
The writing lasers form a grating by modulating density of matter or by localizing matter (trapping) on the regions of maxima (or minima) of the writing interference fields. A thermal grating is an example. Matter gratings have slow dynamics (milliseconds) compared to population and phase gratings (potentially nanoseconds and faster).

=== Population gratings ===
The writing lasers are resonant with optical transitions in the matter and the grating is formed by optical pumping (See Fig. 3). This type of grating can be easily tuned to produce multiple orders of diffraction.

=== Coherence gratings ===
A grating where the writing lasers form a coherent matter pattern. An example is a pattern of electromagnetically induced transparency.

== Applications ==
Usually two lasers at an angle are used to build an EIG. The EIG is used to diffract a third laser, to monitor the behavior of the underlying substrate where the EIG was written or to serve as a switch for one of the lasers involved in the process.

== See also ==
- Atomic coherence
- Electromagnetically induced transparency
- Bragg's law
- Optical lattice
- Spectral hole burning
- Kerr effect
- Stimulated Raman spectroscopy
