= Electromagnetically induced transparency =

Intereference effect in quantum optics

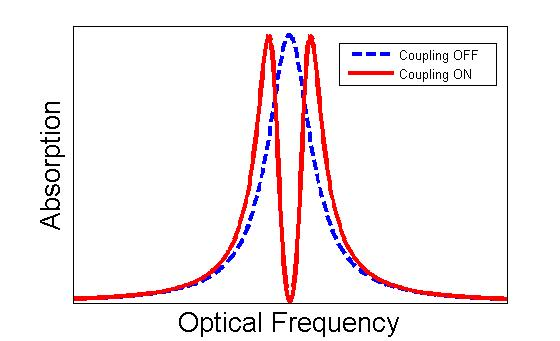
The effect of EIT on a typical absorption line. A weak probe normally experiences absorption shown in blue. A second coupling beam induces EIT and creates a "window" in the absorption region (red). This plot is a computer simulation of EIT in an InAs/GaAs quantum dot

Electromagnetically induced transparency (EIT) is a coherent optical nonlinearity which renders a medium transparent within a narrow spectral range around an absorption line. Extreme dispersion is also created within this transparency "window" which leads to "slow light", described below. It is in essence a quantum interference effect that permits the propagation of light through an otherwise opaque atomic medium.

Observation of EIT involves two optical fields (highly coherent light sources, such as lasers) which are tuned to interact with three quantum states of a material. The "probe" field is tuned near resonance between two of the states and measures the absorption spectrum of the transition. A much stronger "coupling" field is tuned near resonance at a different transition. If the states are selected properly, the presence of the coupling field will create a spectral "window" of transparency which will be detected by the probe. The coupling laser is sometimes referred to as the "control" or "pump", the latter in analogy to incoherent optical nonlinearities such as spectral hole burning or saturation.

EIT is based on the destructive interference of the transition probability amplitude between atomic states. Closely related to EIT are coherent population trapping (CPT) phenomena.

The quantum interference in EIT can be exploited to laser cool atomic particles, even down to the quantum mechanical ground state of motion. This was used in 2015 to directly image individual atoms trapped in an optical lattice.

== Medium requirements ==
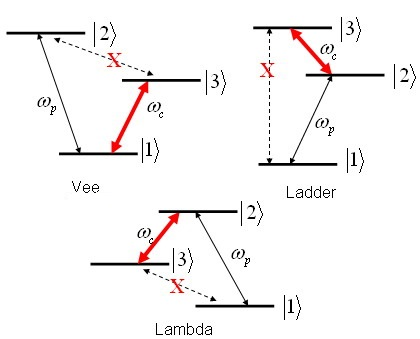
EIT level schemes can be sorted into three categories; vee, ladder, and lambda.

There are specific restrictions on the configuration of the three states. Two of the three possible transitions between the states must be "dipole allowed", i.e. the transitions can be induced by an oscillating electric field. The third transition must be "dipole forbidden." One of the three states is connected to the other two by the two optical fields. The three types of EIT schemes are differentiated by the energy differences between this state and the other two. The schemes are the ladder, vee, and lambda. Any real material system may contain many triplets of states which could theoretically support EIT, but there are several practical limitations on which levels can actually be used.

Also important are the dephasing rates of the individual states. In any real system at non-zero temperature there are processes which cause a scrambling of the phase of the quantum states. In the gas phase, this means usually collisions. In solids, dephasing is due to interaction of the electronic states with the host lattice. The dephasing of state $|3\rangle$ is especially important; ideally $|3\rangle$ should be a robust, metastable state.

Currently EIT research uses atomic systems in dilute gases, solid solutions, or more exotic states such as Bose–Einstein condensate. EIT has been demonstrated in electromechanical and optomechanical systems, where it is known as optomechanically induced transparency. Work is also being done in semiconductor nanostructures such as quantum wells, quantum wires and quantum dots.

== Theory ==
EIT was first proposed theoretically by professor Jakob Khanin and graduate student Olga Kocharovskaya at Gorky State University (renamed to Nizhny Novgorod in 1990), Russia; there are now several different approaches to a theoretical treatment of EIT. One approach is to extend the density matrix treatment used to drive Rabi oscillation of a two-state, single field system. In this picture the probability amplitude for the system to transfer between states can interfere destructively, preventing absorption. In this context, "interference" refers to interference between quantum events (transitions) and not optical interference of any kind. As a specific example, consider the lambda scheme shown above. Absorption of the probe is defined by transition from $|1\rangle$ to $|2\rangle$. The fields can drive population from $|1\rangle$-$|2\rangle$ directly or from $|1\rangle$-$|2\rangle$-$|3\rangle$-$|2\rangle$. The probability amplitudes for the different paths interfere destructively. If $|3\rangle$ has a comparatively long lifetime, then the result will be a transparent window completely inside of the $|1\rangle$-$|2\rangle$ absorption line.

Another approach is the "dressed state" picture, wherein the system + coupling field Hamiltonian is diagonalized and the effect on the probe is calculated in the new basis. In this picture EIT resembles a combination of Autler-Townes splitting and Fano interference between the dressed states. Between the doublet peaks, in the center of the transparency window, the quantum probability amplitudes for the probe to cause a transition to either state cancel.

A polariton picture is particularly important in describing stopped light schemes. Here, the photons of the probe are coherently "transformed" into "dark state polaritons" which are excitations of the medium. These excitations exist (or can be "stored") for a length of time dependent only on the dephasing rates.

== Slow light and stopped light ==
Rapid change of index of refraction (blue) in a region of rapidly changing absorption (gray) associated with EIT. The steep and positive linear region of the refractive index in the center of the transparency window gives rise to slow light

EIT is only one of many diverse mechanisms which can produce slow light. The Kramers–Kronig relations dictate that a change in absorption (or gain) over a narrow spectral range must be accompanied by a change in refractive index over a similarly narrow region. This rapid and positive change in refractive index produces an extremely low group velocity. The first experimental observation of the low group velocity produced by EIT was by Boller, İmamoğlu, and Harris at Stanford University in 1991 in strontium. In 1999 Lene Hau reported slowing light in a medium of ultracold sodium atoms, achieving this by using quantum interference effects responsible for electromagnetically induced transparency (EIT). Her group performed copious research regarding EIT with Stephen E. Harris. "Using detailed numerical simulations, and analytical theory, we study properties of micro-cavities which incorporate materials that exhibit Electro-magnetically Induced Transparency (EIT) or Ultra Slow Light (USL). We find that such systems, while being miniature in size (order wavelength), and integrable, can have some outstanding properties. In particular, they could have lifetimes orders of magnitude longer than other existing systems, and could exhibit non-linear all-optical switching at single photon power levels. Potential applications include miniature atomic clocks, and all-optical quantum information processing." The current record for slow light in an EIT medium is held by Budker, Kimball, Rochester, and Yashchuk at U.C. Berkeley in 1999. Group velocities as low as 8 m/s were measured in a warm thermal rubidium vapor.

Stopped light, in the context of an EIT medium, refers to the coherent transfer of photons to the quantum system and back again. In principle, this involves switching off the coupling beam in an adiabatic fashion while the probe pulse is still inside of the EIT medium. There is experimental evidence of trapped pulses in EIT medium. Authors created a stationary light pulse inside the atomic coherent media. In 2009 researchers from Harvard University and MIT demonstrated a few-photon optical switch for quantum optics based on the slow light ideas. Lene Hau and a team from Harvard University were the first to demonstrate stopped light.

== EIT cooling ==
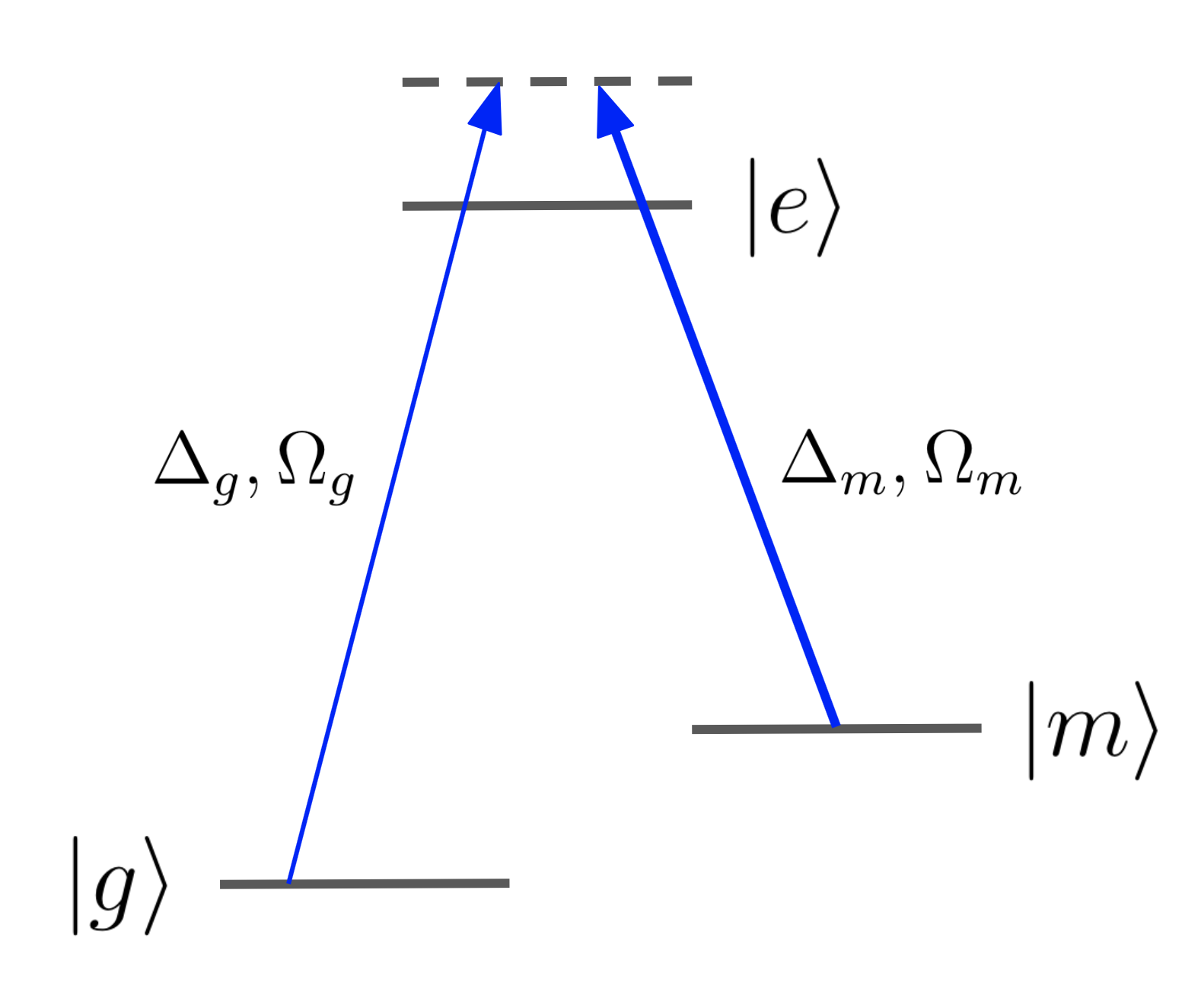
Three level lambda structure that is used for EIT cooling, with the Rabi frequencies $\displaystyle \Omega_g, \Omega_m$ and detunings $\Delta_g, \Delta_m$ of the cooling and coupling laser, respectively.

EIT has been used to laser cool long strings of atoms to their motional ground state in an ion trap. To illustrate the cooling technique, consider a three level atom as shown with a ground state $|g\rangle$, an excited state $|e\rangle$, and a stable or metastable state $|m\rangle$ that lies in between them. The excited state $|e\rangle$ is dipole coupled to $|m\rangle$ and $|g\rangle$. An intense "coupling" laser drives the $|m \rangle \rightarrow |e\rangle$ transition at detuning $\Delta_m$ above resonance. Due to the quantum interference of transition amplitudes, a weaker "cooling" laser driving the $|g \rangle \rightarrow |e\rangle$ transition at detuning $\Delta_g$ above resonance sees a Fano-like feature on the absorption profile. EIT cooling is realized when $\Delta_g = \Delta_m$, such that the carrier transition $|g,n \rangle \rightarrow |e, n\rangle$ lies on the dark resonance of the Fano-like feature, where $n$ is used to label the quantized motional state of the atom. The Rabi frequency $\Omega_m$ of the coupling laser is chosen such that the $|g,n \rangle \rightarrow |e, n-1\rangle$ "red" sideband lies on the narrow maximum of the Fano-like feature. Conversely the $|g,n \rangle \rightarrow |e, n+1\rangle$ "blue" sideband lies in a region of low excitation probability, as shown in the figure below. Due to the large ratio of the excitation probabilities, the cooling limit is lowered in comparison to doppler or sideband cooling (assuming the same cooling rate).

== See also ==
- Atomic coherence
- Electromagnetically Induced Grating
