= Jens Nørskov =

Danish physicist (born 1952)

Jens K. Nørskov
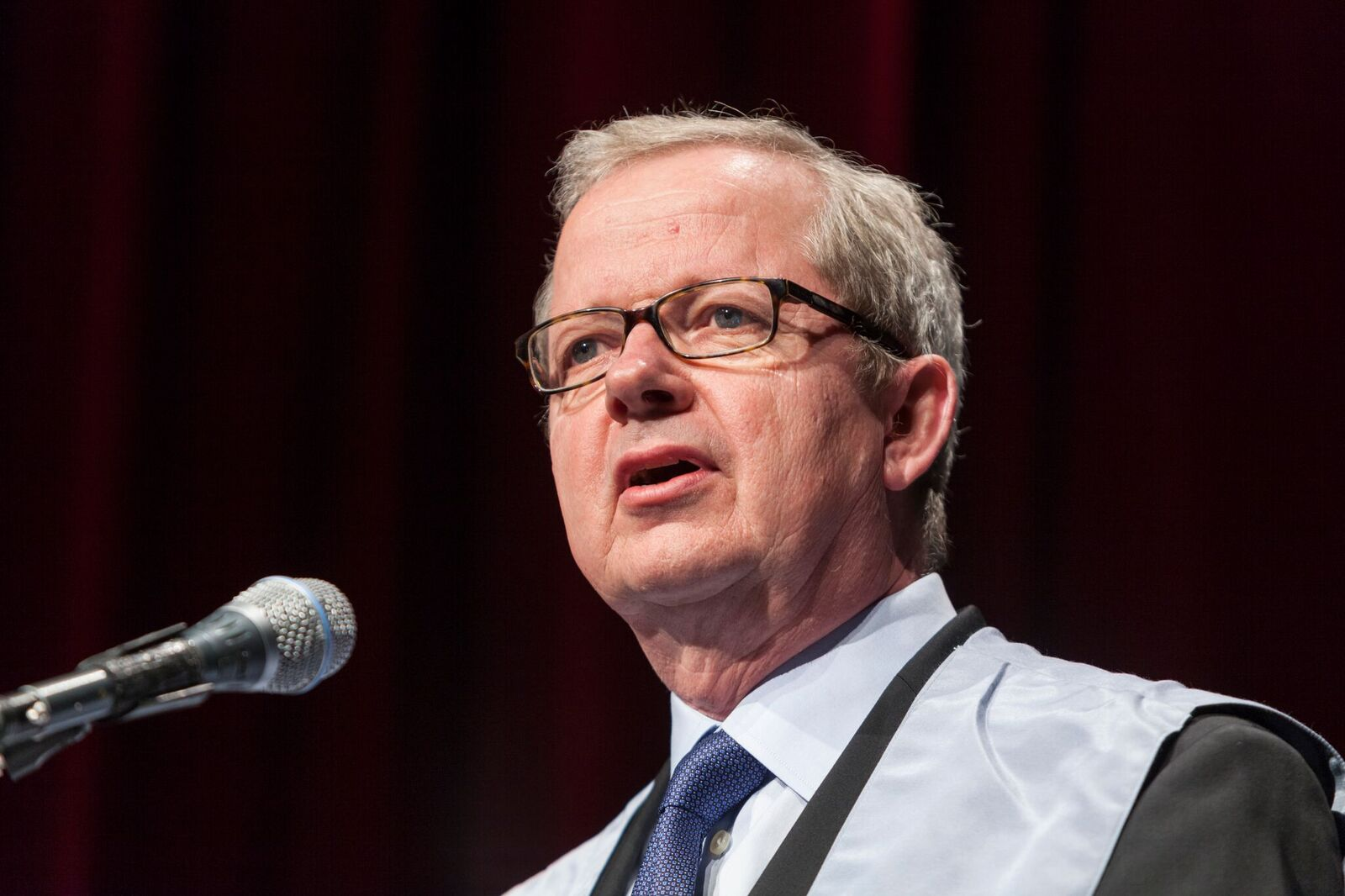
- Jens Nørskov in Trondheim in 2012, receiving an honorary doctorate at NTNU
- Born: Jens Kehlet Nørskov; September 21, 1952 (age 74); Denmark
- Education: University of Aarhus
- Awards: H. C. Ørsted Medal (2024); ENI award (2022); Niels Bohr International Gold Medal (2018); ETH Zurich Chemical Engineering Medal (2018); European Inventor Award (2016; Murray Raney Award (2016); Carlsberg Foundation Research Prize (2015); Rigmor and Carl Holst-Knudsen Award for Scientific Research (2015); Irving Langmuir Award (2015); Michel Boudart Award for the Advancement of Catalysis (2014); G.A. Hagemanns Gold Medal (2013); Giuseppe Parravano Memorial Award (2011); Alwin Mittasch Award (2009); Gerhard Ertl Lecture & Award (2009); Gábor A. Somorjai Award (2009); Science of Hydrogen and Energy Award (2009); Grundfos Prize (2007); Mulliken medal (2007); Innovation Prize(2007); Richard A. Glenn Award (2003); Villum Kann Rasmussen's Award (1991); Danish Physical Society's Prize (1990); Samuel Friedman (Rescue) Award (1989); Reinholdt W. Jorch's Award (1987); ECOSS Prize (1979)
- Scientific career
- Workplaces: Technical University of Denmark; Stanford University; SLAC National Accelerator Laboratory; Thomas J. Watson Research Center; Topsoe; Nordita
- Thesis: A theoretical study of Hydrogen Impurities in free-electron-like Metals (1979)
- Doctoral advisor: B. I. Lundqvist

Jens K. Nørskov is the Villum Kann Rasmussen professor at the Technical University of Denmark. He is a Danish physicist known for his scientific work on heterogeneous catalysis.

== Education ==
Jens Nørskov earned his MSc in Physics and Chemistry in 1976 and his PhD in Theoretical Physics in 1979 from the University of Aarhus Denmark under B. I. Lundqvist.

== Academic career ==
Following his PhD, he served as a research fellow, postdoctoral associate and staff scientist at various institutions including IBM T.J. Watson Research Center, Nordita, and Haldor Topsoe. In 1987, Jens Nørskov began serving as a research professor at Technical University of Denmark and was named professor of theoretical physics in 1992. In June 2010, he moved to Stanford University to become the Leland T. Edwards Professor of Chemical Engineering and the Founding Director of the SUNCAT Center for Interface Science and Catalysis at Stanford and SLAC. In July 2018, he moved back to the Technical University of Denmark to hold the Villum Kann Rasmussen Chair. Nørskov was the chair of the Danish National Research Foundation 2019-2023.

== Research ==
Jens Nørskov has since the mid-1970s made extensive contributions in both theory development and application of theory to a wide range of catalytic systems. He is known for his work on electronic structure theory and the description of surfaces, catalysis, materials, nanostructures, and biomolecules. He is the central figure in a "school of heterogeneous catalysis" where he together with more than 950 collaborators over the past 50 years has published more than 780 scientific papers. Jens Nørskov has throughout his career focused on the integration of theory and experiments in the fields of surface science and catalysis, and has together with collaborators developed many key concepts, such as Effective Medium Theory, the Hammer-Nørskov d-band model, the computational hydrogen electrode, scaling relations for adsorption energies/reaction energy barriers, and models for understanding electronic- and spin-effects in alkali and rare-earth promotion of catalytic activity. His scientific work has established a broad atomic-scale understanding of trends in catalysis over transition metal surfaces and his computational research has in several instances led to the development of new ideas for catalysts e.g. for thermal methanation and ammonia synthesis as well as electrochemical ammonia and fuel-cell catalysis.

== Honours ==
Jens Nørskov is an Elected Fellow of the American Physical Society and a foreign member of the US National Academy of Engineering, and is a member of the Royal Danish Academy of Sciences and Letters, the Danish Academy of Technical Sciences, Academia Europaea. He holds honorary doctorates from the Eindhoven University of Technology (TU/e), the Norwegian University of Science and Technology (NTNU), the Technical University of Munich (TUM) and from the University of Jyväskylä.

== Books ==
- Fundamental Concepts in Heterogeneous Catalysis, Jens Nørskov, Felix Studt, Frank Abild-Pedersen, Thomas Bligaard.
- Chemical Bonding at Surfaces and Interfaces, edited by Anders Nilsson, Lars G.M. Pettersson, Jens Nørskov.
- Fuel Cell Science: Theory, Fundamentals, and Biocatalysis, edited by Andrzej Wieckowski, Jens Nørskov.

== Personal life ==
Jens Kehlet Nørskov is married to Bodil Kehlet Nørskov.
