= Rigmor and Carl Holst-Knudsen Award for Scientific Research =

The Rigmor and Carl Holst-Knudsen Award for Scientific Research is one of Denmark's oldest and most prestigious science prizes. It was established in 1956, on the birthday of Carl Holst-Knudsen, who was at that time the chairman of the board at Aarhus University. Originally worth 10 thousand Danish krones (DKK), it has grown to 100 thousand DKK in monetary value, and is awarded on 28 May annually. It is given without application "as a mark of respect", to a researcher who has produced one or more significant results which show promise in future research.

== Award Recipients since 2000 ==
- 2012 : Professor Oluf Borbye Pedersen from The Novo Nordisk Foundation Center for Basic Metabolic Research, University of Copenhagen; Professor Timo Teräsvirta from CREATES, Department of Economics at Aarhus University
- 2011: Professor Lise Hannestad, Department of Anthropology, Archaeology and Linguistics; Professor Flemming Besenbacher, Interdisciplinary Nanoscience Center (INANO)
- 2010: Professor Bjarne Stroustrup, Texas A & M University, College of Engineering Chair, Professor in Computer Science; Professor Poul Nissen, Department of Molecular Biology
- 2009: Professor Jens F. Rehfeld, University of Copenhagen, Department of Clinical Biochemistry; Professor Bo Brummerstedt Iversen, Interdisciplinary Nanoscience Center and Department of Chemistry
- 2008: Professor Lene Hau, Harvard University Physics and Applied Physics; Associate Professor Andreas Roepstorff, Department of Anthropology, Archaeology and Linguistics; Professor Tim Bollerslev, Duke University, Economics
- 2007: Professor Dorthe Berntsen, Department of Psychology
- 2006: Associate Professor Maria Fabricius Hansen, Department of Art History
- 2005: Associate Professor Lars Albinus, Department of Systematic Theology
- 2004: Professor Klaus Mølmer, Department of Physics and Astronomy
- 2003: No award due to the distribution of 5 anniversary fund prices
- 2002: Professor Jens Christian Djuurhus, Department of Experimental Clinical Research
- 2001: Professor Niels Haldrup, Department of Economics
- 2000: Associate Professor Peter Bugge, Slavic Department
