= Entrepreneurial finance =

Entrepreneurial finance is the study of value and resource allocation, applied to new ventures. It addresses key questions which challenge all entrepreneurs: how much money can and should be raised; when should it be raised and from whom; what is a reasonable valuation of the startup; and how should funding contracts and exit decisions be structured.

== The problem ==
Depending on the industry and aspirations of the entrepreneur(s), they may need to attract money to fully commercialize their concepts. Thus they must find investors – such as their friends and family, a bank, an angel investor, a venture capital fund, a public stock offering or some other source of financing. When dealing with most classic sources of funding, entrepreneurs face numerous challenges: skepticism towards the business and financial plans, requests for large equity stakes, tight control and managerial influence and limited understanding of the characteristic of growth process that start-ups experience.

On the other hand, entrepreneurs must understand the four basic problems that can limit investors' willingness to invest capital:

- Uncertainty about the future: in terms of start-ups development possibilities, market and industry trends. The greater the uncertainty of a venture or project, the greater the distribution of possible outcomes.
- Information gaps: differences in what various players know about a company's investment decisions.
- "Soft Assets": these assets are unique and rarely have markets that allow for the measure of their value. Thus, lenders are less willing to provide credit against such an asset.
- Volatility of current market conditions: financial and product markets can change overnight, affecting a venture's current value and its potential profitability.

== History ==
Venture capital as the business of investing in new or young companies with innovative ideas emerged as a prominent branch of Entrepreneurial finance in the beginning of the 20th century. Wealthy families such as the Vanderbilt family, the Rockefeller family and the Bessemer family began private investing in private companies. One of the first venture capital firms, J.H. Whitney & Company, was founded in 1946 and is still in business today. The formation of the American Research and Development Foundation (ARDC) by General Georges F. Doriot institutionalized venture capital after the Second World War. In 1958, the Small Business Investment Companies (SBIC) license enabled finance companies to leverage federal US funds to lend to growing companies. Further regulatory changes in the USA –namely the reduction of capital gains tax and the ERISA pension reforms- boosted venture capital in the 1970s. During the 1980s and 1990s, the venture capital industry grew in importance and experienced high volatility in returns. Despite this cyclicality and crises such as the dot-com bubble, venture capital has consistently performed better than most other financial investments and continues to attract new investors.

== Sources of entrepreneurial financing ==
=== Financial bootstrapping ===
Financial Bootstrapping is a term used to cover different methods for avoiding using the financial resources of external investors. It involves risks for the founders but allows for more freedom to develop the venture. Different types of financial bootstrapping include Owner financing, Sweat equity, Minimization of accounts payable, joint utilization, minimization of inventory, delaying payment, subsidy finance and personal debt.

=== External financing ===
Businesses often need more capital than owners are able to provide. Hence, they source financing from external investors: angel investment, venture capital, as well as with less prevalent crowdfunding, hedge funds, and alternative asset management. While owning equity in a private company may be generally grouped under the term private equity, this term is often used to describe growth, buyout or turnaround investments in traditional sectors and industries.

==== Business angels ====
A business angel is a private investor that invests part of his or her own wealth and time in early-stage innovative companies. It is estimated that angel investment amounts to three times venture capital. Its beginnings can be traced to Frederick Terman, widely credited to be the "Father of Silicon Valley" (together with William Shockley), who invested $500 to help starting up the venture of Bill Hewlett and Fred Packard.

==== Venture capital ====
Venture capital is a way of corporate financing by which a financial investor takes participation in the capital of a new or young private company in exchange for cash and strategic advice. Venture capital investors look for fast-growing companies with low leverage capacity and high-performing management teams. Their main objective is to make a profit by selling the stake in the company in the medium term. They expect profitability higher than the market to compensate for the increased risk of investing in young ventures. In addition to this, there are also corporate venture capitalists Corporate venture capital that strongly focus on strategic benefits.

Key differences between business angels and venture capital:

- Own money (BA) vs. other people's money (VC)
- Fun + profit vs. profit
- Lower vs. higher expected IRR
- Very early stage vs. start-up or growth stage
- Longer investment period vs. shorter investment horizon

==== Buyouts ====
Buyouts are forms of corporate finance used to change the ownership or the type of ownership of a company through a variety of means. Once the company is private and freed from some of the regulatory and other burdens of being a public company, the central goal of buyout is to discover means to build this value. This may include refocusing the mission of the company, selling off non-core assets, freshening product lines, streamlining processes and replacing existing management. Companies with steady, large cash flows, established brands and moderated growth are typical targets of buyouts.

There are several variations of buyouts:

- Leveraged buyout (LBO): a combination of debt and equity financing. The intention is to unlock hidden value through the addition of substantial amounts of debt to the balance sheet of the company.
- Management buyout (MBO), Management buy in (MBI) and Buy in management buyout (BIMBO): private equity becomes the sponsor of a management team that has identified a business opportunity with a price well above the team's wealth. The difference is in the position of the purchaser: the management is already working for the company (MBO), the management is new (MBI) or a combination (BIMBO).
- Buy and built (B&B): the acquisition of several small companies with the objective of creating a leader (highly fragmented sectors such as supermarkets, gyms, schools, private hospitals).
- Recaps: re-leveraging of a company that has repaid much of its LBO debt.
- Secondary Buyout (SBO): sale of LBO-company to another private equity firm.
- Public-to-private (P2P, PTOP): takeover of public company that has been 'punished' by the market, i.e. its price does not reflect the true value.

== Major entrepreneurial financial planning ==
=== Importance ===
Financial planning allows entrepreneurs to estimate the quantity and the timing of money needed to start their venture and keep it running.

The key questions for an Entrepreneur are:

- Is it worthy to invest time and money in this business?
- What is the cash burn rate?
- How to minimize dilution by external investors?
- Scenario analysis and contingency plan?

A start-up's chief financial officer (CFO) assumes the key role of entrepreneurial financial planning. In contrast to established companies, the start-up CFO takes a more strategic role and focuses on milestones with given cash resources, changes in valuation depending on their fulfilment, risks of not meeting milestones and potential outcomes and alternative strategies.

=== Determination of the financial need of a start-up ===
The first step in raising capital is to understand how much capital is needed. Successful businesses anticipate their future cash needs, make plans and execute capital acquisition strategies well before they find themselves in a cash crunch.

Three axioms guide start-up fund raising:

- As businesses grow, they often go through several rounds or stages of financing. These rounds are targeted to specific phases of the company's growth and require different strategies and types of investors.
- Raising capital is an ongoing issue for every venture.
- Capital acquisition takes time and needs to be planned accordingly.

Four critical determinants of the financial need of a venture are generally distinguished:

- Determination of projected sales, their growth and the profitability level
- Calculation of start-up costs (one-time costs)
- Estimation of recurring costs
- Projection of working capital (inventory, credit and payment policies. This determines the cash needed to maintain the day-to-day business)

Typically, venture capitalists are part of a fund. Their average size in Europe includes five investment professionals and two supports. They generate income through management fees (on average 2.5% annual commission) and carried interest ("Carry", on average 20–30% of the profits of the fund).

== Valuation in entrepreneurial finance ==
Financial planning also helps to determine the value of a venture and serves as an important marketing tool towards prospective investors.

Traditional valuation techniques based on accounting, discounting cash flows (Discounted cash flow, DCF) or multiples do not reflect the specific characteristics of a start-up. Instead, the venture capital method, the First Chicago or the fundamental methods are usually applied.

=== Venture capital method ===
To determine the future value of a start-up, a venture capital investor is guided by the question: What percentage of the portfolio company should I have at exit to guarantee that I get the IRR committed with my investors?

The valuation of the future company can be broken down into four steps:

- Determination of company's value at exit
- Requested fraction (percentage) of the VC at exit?
- Number of shares to be bought in the current round of financing to get the desired percentage of the company
- Estimation of maximum price per share willing to pay in current round of financing

Usually there is more than one round of financing. Venture capital investors generally prefer staged investments to reduce the money invested at the higher risk and control entrepreneurs via milestones. Entrepreneurs benefit from dilution in future rounds by reducing the price of the shares to be exchanged for financing.

== University education ==
Entrepreneurial finance courses are offered in different universities, for example at Babson College, the Stern School of Business, the Kellogg School of Management, Peking University HSBC Business School, and ESADE. Special centers to promote entrepreneurship within universities also cover finance topics, for example the Center for International Development at Harvard University, which works to generate shared and sustainable prosperity in developing economies

== Books ==
- Ante, S. (2008) Creative Capital: George Doriot and the Birth of Venture Capital, Harvard Business School Press, Boston. ISBN 1-4221-0122-3.
- Perkins, T. (2007) Valley Boy: The Education of Tom Perkins, Gotham, London. ISBN 1-59240-403-0.
- Feld, B. (2016), Venture Deals: Be Smarter Than Your Lawyer and Venture Capitalist, ISBN 1-11925-975-4.
