= Paul Horowitz =

American physicist (born 1942)

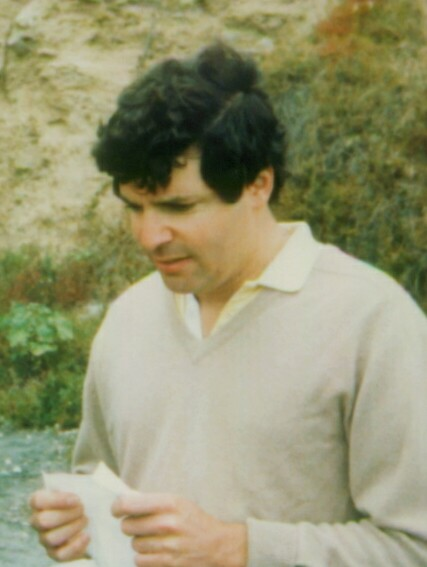
- Paul Horowitz (1986)
- Born: 1942 (age 83–84)
- Education: Harvard University
- Known for: Author, Electrical Engineer, Physicist, SETI
- Awards: Drake Award (2021)
- Website: Faculty webpage

Paul Horowitz (born 1942) is an American physicist and electrical engineer, known primarily for his work in electronics design, as well as for his role in the search for extraterrestrial intelligence (see SETI).

== Biography ==
At age 8, Horowitz achieved distinction as the world's youngest amateur radio operator. He went on to study physics at Harvard University (A.B., 1965; A.M., 1967; Ph.D., 1970), where he has also spent all of his subsequent career. His early work was on scanning microscopy (using both protons and X-rays). Horowitz has also conducted astrophysical research on pulsars and investigations in biophysics. His interest in practical electronics has led to a handful of inventions, including an automated voting machine and an acoustic mechanism for landmine detection, and an electronic Morse Code/Baudot code keyboard using a diode matrix and 66 TTL integrated circuits for Amateur Radio use. Since 1974 he has taught a practical course in electronics whose lecture notes became one of the best known textbooks in the field: The Art of Electronics (coauthored with Winfield Hill and James MacArthur).

Horowitz was one of the pioneers of the search of intelligent life beyond the Earth, and one of the leaders behind SETI. This work has attracted both admiration and criticism. Harvard biologist Ernst Mayr has sharply criticized Horowitz for wasting the resources of the university and the efforts of graduate students on such an endeavour. Carl Sagan provided a rebuttal to Mayr's criticism and referenced a prior petition in support of SETI that eminent biologists and biochemists had signed:

We are unanimous in our conviction that the only significant test of the existence of extraterrestrial intelligence is an experimental one. No a priori arguments on this subject can be compelling or should be used as a substitute for an observational program. We urge the organization of a coordinated, worldwide, and systematic search for extraterrestrial intelligence.

— 69 signatories, including David Baltimore, Melvin Calvin, Francis Crick, Manfred Eigen, Thomas Eisner, Stephen Jay Gould, Matthew Meselson, Linus Pauling, David Raup, and E.O. Wilson, Science Magazine

Sagan was believed to have based the main character in his novel Contact partly on Horowitz.

Horowitz led the META and BETA SETI projects. Horowitz and Sagan reported that, in the course of project META, they had detected 37 signals "which survived all our cuts" and cannot be positively identified. On September 10, 1988 the university's 84-foot radio dish detected "an enormous spike which was 750 times noise. If you converted the radio signal into audio it would sound just like a tone. It would sound like a flute." All 37 signals, however, have been single events which have never been heard again. The software company 37signals has been named after these signals.

Horowitz holds professorial appointments at Harvard in both physics and electrical engineering. He has also served as a member of the JASON Defense Advisory Group.

== Works ==
- Horowitz, Paul; Hill, Winfield (1989). The Art of Electronics. Cambridge University Press. ISBN 0-521-37095-7.
- Horowitz, Paul; Hill, Winfield (2015). The Art of Electronics (3 ed.). Cambridge University Press. ISBN 978-0521809269.
- Horowitz, Paul; Hill, Winfield (2020). The Art of Electronics: the X-Chapters (1 ed.). Cambridge University Press. ISBN 978-1108499941.
