= Winfield Hill =

American engineer

Winfield Hill is the Director of the Electronics Engineering Laboratory at the Rowland Institute at Harvard University. A self-proclaimed "electronics circuit-design guru" and trained physicist and electronic engineer, he co-authored the popular text The Art of Electronics with Harvard Physicist Paul Horowitz.

Engineering work by Hill in the late 1970s at Harvard led him to found the Sea Data Corporation, which designed instruments for deep-sea oceanography.
