= L. Mahadevan =

Indian-American mathematician

L. Mahadevan FRS
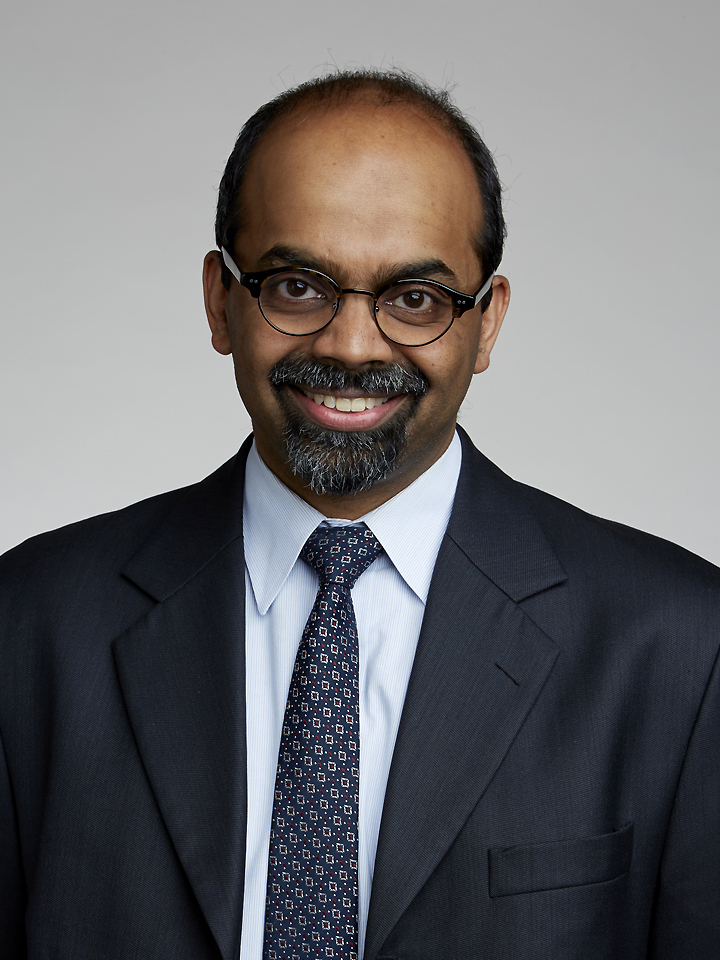
- Mahadevan in 2016
- Born: Lakshminarayanan Mahadevan
- Education: IIT Madras (B.Tech., 1986); University of Texas at Austin (M.S., 1987); Stanford University (Ph.D., 1995)
- Spouse: Amala Mahadevan
- Awards: Guggenheim Fellow (2006); MacArthur Fellow(2009); Fellow of the Royal Society (2016); Fellow of the American Academy of Arts and Sciences (2023); Member of the National Academy of Sciences (2026)
- Scientific career
- Fields: Biology; Physics
- Workplaces: Massachusetts Institute of Technology; Cambridge University; Harvard University
- Thesis: Folding sheets, twisted strips and coiling ropes (1995)
- Doctoral advisor: Joseph B. Keller
- Website: softmath.seas.harvard.edu

Lakshminarayanan Mahadevan FRS is an Indian-American scientist. He is currently the Lola England de Valpine Professor of Applied Mathematics, Organismic and Evolutionary Biology and Physics at Harvard University. His work centers around understanding the organization of matter in space and time (that is, how it is shaped and how it flows, particularly at the scale observable by the unaided senses, in both physical and biological systems). Mahadevan is a 2009 MacArthur Fellow and an elected member of the National Academy of Sciences as well as the American Academy of Arts and Sciences.

== Education ==
Mahadevan graduated from the Indian Institute of Technology, Madras, and then received an M.S. from the University of Texas at Austin, and an M.S. and Ph.D. from Stanford University in 1995.

== Career and research ==
He started his independent career on the faculty at the Massachusetts Institute of Technology in 1996. In 2000, he was elected the inaugural Schlumberger Professor of Complex Physical Systems in the Department of Applied Mathematics and Theoretical Physics, and a professorial fellow of Trinity College, Cambridge, University of Cambridge, the first Indian to be appointed professor to the Faculty of Mathematics there. He has been at Harvard since 2003.

Since 2017, he and his wife Amala Mahadevan have been faculty deans of Mather House, one of twelve residential houses at Harvard College.

=== Awards ===
- 2026 Elected member of the National Academy of Sciences
- 2024 Weldon Memorial Medal and Prize
- 2023 Elected fellow of the American Academy of Arts and Sciences
- 2016 Fellow of the Royal Society
- 2014 Clay Senior Scholar
- 2009 MacArthur Fellow
- 2006 Guggenheim Fellowship
- 2007 Ig Nobel Prize for physics
- 2007 Visiting Miller Professor, University of California, Berkeley
- 2006 George Ledlie Prize, Harvard University

== See also ==
- List of Ig Nobel Prize winners
