= The Art of Electronics =

Written work by Paul Horowitz and Winfield Hill

- Cover of 2nd edition
- Author: Paul Horowitz, Winfield Hill
- Language: English (US)
- Subject: Electronics
- Publisher: Cambridge University Press
- Publication date: 1980 (1st ed.); 1989 (2nd ed.); 2015 (3rd ed.)
- Publication place: United States
- Media type: Print (hardcover)
- Pages: 1125
- ISBN: 978-0-521-37095-0
- OCLC: 19125711
- Dewey Decimal: 621.381 19
- LC Class: TK7815 .H67 1989

The Art of Electronics, by Paul Horowitz and Winfield Hill, is a popular electronics design reference textbook dealing with analog and digital electronics. The third edition was published in 2015.

== Overview ==
The book covers many areas of circuit design, from basic DC voltage, current, and resistance, to active filters and oscillators, to digital electronics, including microprocessors and digital bus interfacing. It also includes discussions of such often-neglected areas as high-frequency, high-speed design techniques and low-power applications.

The book includes many example circuits. In addition to having examples of effective practices in circuit design, the book also demonstrates and explains common pitfalls in circuit design. It can be described as a cross between a textbook and reference manual, though without the chapter-end questions and exercises which are often found in textbooks. The author accepts reports of errata and posts them, to be corrected in future revisions.

=== Editions ===
The Art of Electronics:

- First edition was published in 1980.
- Second edition was published in 1989.
- Third edition was published in 2015.

The Art of Electronics: The X Chapters:

- First edition was released in 2020. It weighs in at over 500 pages and consists of supplementary material not included in the main volume.
- Second edition was released in 2026.

Learning the Art of Electronics: A Hands-On Lab Course:

- Learning the Art of Electronics: A Hands-On Lab Course (formerly Student Manual for The Art of Electronics) by Thomas C. Hayes and Paul Horowitz. While referring to the main text extensively, it is designed specifically to teach electronics. It contains laboratory exercises and explanatory text supplements aimed at the student. In contrast, The Art of Electronics contains tables, equations, diagrams, and other material practitioners use for reference.
