= Christopher Slowe =

American businessman

- Born: Christopher Brian Slowe; November 8, 1978 (age 47)
- Occupations: Businessman, co-founder and CTO of Reddit

Academic background
- Education: Harvard University
- Thesis: Experiments and simulations in cooling and trapping of a high flux rubidium beam (2007)
- Doctoral advisor: Lene Hau

Christopher Brian Slowe (born November 8, 1978) is an American businessman. He gained his PhD in physics from Harvard University, and went on to co-found Reddit, with Aaron Swartz, Alexis Ohanian, and Steve Huffman. He later departed Reddit and began work for Hipmunk, where he was Chief Scientist. He returned to Reddit in 2017 and is currently its CTO.

== Career ==
Slowe was awarded his PhD in physics from Harvard for his thesis "Experiments and simulations in cooling and trapping of a high flux rubidium beam". His thesis advisor was Professor Lene Hau. During his time as a research assistant at Harvard, he also began to devise computer programs. Whilst studying, in the final year of his PhD he and a group of other Harvard students received startup funding from Y Combinator for their company TBD, later renamed Memamp. "I just wanted to design something to make it easier to work on my thesis," Slowe explained. "And I'll still be happy if that's what I end up with." Memamp failed as both Google and Apple introduced software similar to that which Slowe was seeking to develop. Immediately upon graduating he left academia to join Reddit, a social news website.

Reddit was acquired by Condé Nast Publications, the owner of technology Magazine WIRED in October 2006. Conde Nast wanted Reddit to "just focus on building out, which may involve adding to the current staff of four (all co-founders), who will all move from Boston to San Francisco and work at Wired's office." Fellow co-founders at Reddit departed after the Conde Nast acquisition, Aaron Swartz resigning, and Huffman and Ohanian seeing out the legal duration of their contracts, before moving immediately to travel startup Hipmunk. Slowe remained Reddit's longest standing employee, and CEO, until 2010, when he left to become Chief Scientist at Hipmunk. There was much speculation as to the terms of his departure, but Slowe remained diplomatic, despite rumours of underfunding and understaffing by new owners Conde Nast. In an interview with TechCrunch he stated "it was time to do something new ... that is less fully formed with room to explore." Slowe took on the job of troubleshooting most of the Hipmunk travel software.

Slowe rejoined Reddit in 2017 as chief technology officer.
