= Zachary Dutton =

Zachary John Dutton is an American physicist who has worked on research centred mainly around cold atomic gases, EIT, low light level nonlinear optics, quantum memories, and coherent optical. Dutton graduated from Lindsay High School in Lindsay CA, and was awarded a BSc in physics from UC Berkeley in 1996. He was awarded his PhD in theoretical physics at Harvard University in 2000. His doctoral advisor was Prof.Lene Hau for his thesis entitled "Ultra-slow, stopped, and compressed light in Bose–Einstein condensates" He worked on a number of papers with Hau and Cyrus Behroozi, being amongst the first group to stop light completely. He undertook postdoctoral work at NIST–Gaithersburg with Dr. Charles Clark, prior to becoming a staff physicist at the Naval Research Lab in Washington. He conducted research centred mainly around cold atomic gases, EIT, low light level nonlinear optics, quantum memories, and coherent optical storage.

Dutton took a position at Raytheon BBN Technologies Cambridge, Massachusetts in 2007, where his research continued, and he is currently the manager of the Quantum Information Processing (QuIP) group at Raytheon BBN Technologies. QuIP conducts ongoing research, and has facilities in the following areas:

- Bits and Waves Lab
- Quantum Cryptography
- Quantum Sensors
- Superconducting Digital Receivers and Coprocessors
- Superconducting Qubit Systems

In 2011, Dutton and colleagues achieved a breakthrough, recorded in "Direct Observation of Coherent Population Trapping in a Superconducting Artificial Atom". The paper describes a physics breakthrough that Dutton predicted in a paper he published in 2004. The work establishes a major advance in quantum information technology with the coupling of light and superconductors, and is the first instance of light being able to co-exist with superconductors. Normally light (photons) is absorbed by superconductors, but Dutton's team discovered that applying a second field at a different frequency can be used to prevent this absorption, making the artificial atom effectively transparent. The United States Department of Defense has granted further research monies to this project "to create tools and methods that integrate all aspects of the quantum computer".

== Awards ==
- Raytheon Excellence in Engineering and Technology Award for contributions to the development and demonstration of novel receivers and codes for photon efficient communications (March 2012)
- American Physical Society Outstanding Journal Referee awarded to approximately 0.2% of APS referees each year. (Feb. 2012)
- Berman Publication Award, NRL Optical Sciences Div. (Dec. 2007)
- National Research Council (NRC) Fellowship (Oct. 2002-Oct. 2004)
- Harold T. White Prize for introductory teaching in Harvard Physics Dept., based on professor recommendations and student evaluations. (May 1997)
- Harvard University Certificate of Distinction in Teaching, given by Derek Bok Center for Teaching, Harvard Univ., based on student evaluations. (May 1997)
- Univ. of California, Berkeley, Physics Dept. Citation awarded to one graduating senior, based on recommendations of faculty, grades, and research (May 1996)
- Chancellor's Scholarship, Univ. of California, Berkeley (1992-1996)
- Southern California Edison Scholarship (1992-1996)
