= Light dressed state =

In the fields of atomic, molecular, and optical science, the term light dressed state refers to a quantum state of an atomic or molecular system interacting with a laser light in terms of the Floquet picture, i.e. roughly like an atom or a molecule plus a photon. The Floquet picture is based on the Floquet theorem in differential equations with periodic coefficients.

== Mathematical formulation ==
The Hamiltonian of a system of charged particles interacting with a laser light can be expressed as

$H=\sum_i \frac{1}{2m_i}\left[\mathbf{p}_i-\frac{z_i}{c}\mathbf{A(\mathbf{r}_i, t)}\right]^2 +V(\{\mathbf{r}_i\}),$	1

where $\mathbf{A}$ is the vector potential of the electromagnetic field of the laser; $\mathbf{A}$ is periodic in time as $\mathbf{A}(t+T)=\mathbf{A}(t)$. The position and momentum of the $i\,$-th particle are denoted as $\mathbf{r}_i \,$ and $\mathbf{p}_i \,$, respectively, while its mass and charge are symbolized as $m_i \,$ and $z_i \,$, respectively. $c \,$ is the speed of light. By virtue of this time-periodicity of the laser field, the total Hamiltonian is also periodic in time as

$$H(t+T) = H(t) \, .$$

The Floquet theorem guarantees that any solution $\psi(\{\mathbf{r}_i\},t)$ of the Schrödinger equation with this type of Hamiltonian,

$$i\hbar \frac{\partial}{\partial t} \psi(\{\mathbf{r}_i\},t) = H(t)\psi(\{\mathbf{r}_i\},t)$$

can be expressed in the form

$$\psi(\{\mathbf{r}_i\},t) = \exp[-iEt/\hbar]\phi(\{\mathbf{r}_i\},t)$$

where $\phi\,$ has the same time-periodicity as the Hamiltonian, $\phi(\{\mathbf{r}_i\},t+T) = \phi(\{\mathbf{r}_i\},t).$ Therefore, this part can be expanded in a Fourier series, obtaining

$\psi(\{\mathbf{r}_i\},t) = \exp[-iEt/\hbar] \sum_{n=-\infty}^{\infty}\exp[in\omega t]\phi_n(\{\mathbf{r}_i\})$	2

where $\omega (=2\pi/T)\,$ is the frequency of the laser field. This expression (2) reveals that a quantum state of the system governed by the Hamiltonian (1) can be specified by a real number $E\,$ and an integer $n\,$.

The integer $n\,$ in equation (2) can be regarded as the number of photons absorbed from (or emitted to) the laser field. In order to prove this statement, we the correspondence between the solution (2), which is derived from the classical expression of the electromagnetic field where there is no concept of photons, and one which is derived from a quantized electromagnetic field (see quantum field theory). (It can be verified that $n\,$ is equal to the expectation value of the absorbed photon number at the limit of $n\ll N\,$, where $N\,$ is the initial number of total photons.)

== See also ==
- Quantum optics
- Hamiltonian (quantum mechanics)
