= Interdisciplinary Nanoscience Center =

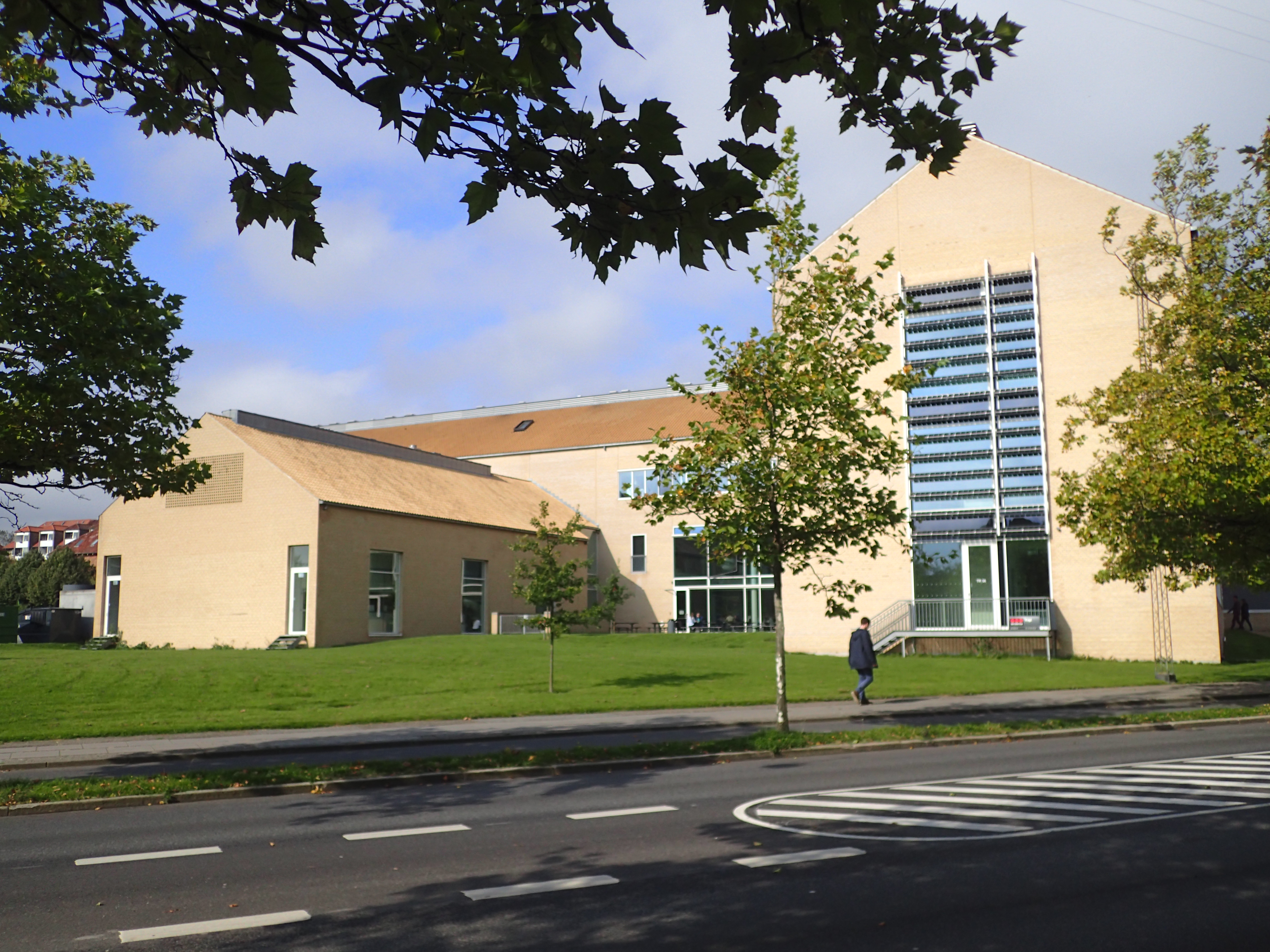
The iNano House, headquarters for the iNano Center.

Interdisciplinary Nanoscience Center (iNANO), is an interdisciplinary research and teaching center for nanoscience at Aarhus University in Aarhus, Denmark. The center was founded in 2002 and has been headquartered in The iNano House since 2012.

== History ==
In 2002, Professor of Physics Flemming Besenbacher founded the iNANO Center and in January 2002, the Danish Minister of Science, Technology and Innovation, Helge Sander, inaugurated the center, stressing the central role of advanced new technologies based on nanoscience in modern-day value creation.

The iNANO center was established with the aim of fostering interdisciplinary research within the area of nanoscience and nanotechnology, i.e. promote synergistic interactions that cross traditional scientific boundaries. iNANO provides a framework in which leading-edge expertise in physics, chemistry, molecular biology, biology, engineering and medicine are combined to create an interdisciplinary environment of international stature with regards to science and technology, and a regional and national power hub for enhancing industrial competitiveness.

The mission of iNANO is threefold;

1. to play a key role in the education of the next generation of scientists in nanoscience at the Bachelor, Master, PhD, and postdoctoral levels
2. to strengthen interdisciplinary research in nanoscience and nanotechnology and catalyze collaborations with other international nanoscience research groups
3. to provide an innovative interface for transfer and transformation of basic nanoscientific knowledge to Danish industry and society.

iNano Center has been directed by Professor in Molecular Biology and Nanoscience Jørgen Kjems since 2014.

== Education ==
The educational programme in nanoscience consists of an interdisciplinary curriculum covering a broad spectrum of introductory, advanced, and specialized courses, which aim at providing the students with a sufficiently broad basis to conduct interdisciplinary research within nanoscience and at the same time achieve disciplinary depth and specialized skills in selected areas. Hence, the education encompasses physics, chemistry, biology, molecular biology, mathematics and computer science.

== Graduate education – iNANOschool ==
Founded in December 2002, iNANOschool is a vocationally oriented graduate school associated to iNANO under the graduate school of science, AGSOS, Faculty of Science, Aarhus University. iNANOschool currently has (May 2010) 155 students enrolled.

== Research ==
The iNANO research centre provides the framework for interdisciplinary projects in the area of nanoscience and nanotechnology. Since the official inauguration in 2002 iNANO has played an important role in setting up an increasing number of interdisciplinary projects. Current research activities fall within the following seven target areas:

- Functional nanomaterials
- Nano-energy material
- Nanomedicine
- Self-assembled molecular nano-structures
- NanoFood
- Nanophotonics and nanoelectronics
- Nanotoxicology and nanoethics
