= 2009 Binghamton shooting =

Mass shooting in New York, U.S.

- Location: 42°05′59″N 75°55′03″W; American Civic Association, Binghamton, New York, U.S.
- Date: April 3, 2009; 17 years ago 10:30 – 10:33 a.m. (EDT)
- Attack type: Mass shooting; mass murder; murder-suicide
- Weapons: 9mm Beretta 92FS Vertec Inox semi-automatic pistol; .45 caliber Beretta Px4 Storm semi-automatic pistol
- Deaths: 14 (including the perpetrator)
- Injuries: 4
- Perpetrator: Jiverly Antares Wong
- Motive: Unknown; possibly revenge over paranoid delusions of alleged police harassment campaign

On April 3, 2009, a mass shooting occurred at the American Civic Association immigration center in Binghamton, New York, United States. At approximately 10:30 a.m. EDT, Jiverly Wong (also known as Jiverly Voong) entered the facility and killed thirteen people and wounded four others before committing suicide.

It is the deadliest mass shooting in the state of New York.

== Shooting ==
At about 10:30 a.m. EDT, Jiverly Wong barricaded the rear door of the Binghamton American Civic Association building with a vehicle registered in his father's name. He was described as wearing a bullet-proof vest, a bright green nylon jacket, and dark-rimmed glasses.

Wong entered through the front door, firing a number of bullets at people in his path. At 10:31 a.m., Broome County Communications received several 911 calls, and the first police were dispatched to the scene. Two of the Civic Association's receptionists were among the first victims shot. While one of the receptionists was reported to have been shot through the head and killed, the second, shot in the stomach, feigned death and, when the gunman moved on, took cover under a desk and called 911. The receptionist's call was taken by 911 staff at 10:38 a.m., when police had already arrived at the scene. The wounded receptionist, 61-year-old Shirley DeLucia, remained on the line for 39 minutes, despite her gunshot wound, and relayed information until she was rescued. She later recounted that the gunman had opened fire without saying anything.

The gunman entered a classroom just off the main reception areas, where an ESL class was being given to students. Out of the 16 people in the room, Wong shot 13 of them, including the professor. He then took dozens of other students hostage. Police arrived within minutes of the first 911 calls. Hearing the alarms, Wong committed suicide by shooting himself at 10:33 a.m., less than two minutes after he first opened fire. In all, Wong fired 99 rounds: 88 from a 9mm Beretta and 11 from a .45-caliber Beretta.

=== Police response ===
Police remained at the perimeter of the property, having locked down nearby Binghamton High School and a number of streets in the area. At one point, not knowing if the gunman was alive or dead, police summoned Broome Community College Assistant Professor Tuong Hung Nguyen, who is fluent in Vietnamese, to help communicate with Wong in the event of contact.

SWAT members entered the Civic Center building and began clearing it at 11:13 a.m., 43 minutes after the first call to the police at 10:30 a.m., and 40 minutes after patrol officers first arrived on the scene at 10:33 a.m. At the time of their entry, they had not yet confirmed that Wong had committed suicide, and they proceeded with caution. At approximately noon, ten people left the building, with another ten following approximately forty minutes later. Some of the hostages had escaped to a basement, while more than a dozen remained hidden in a closet. Thanh Huynh, a high school teacher of Vietnamese background, was asked to interpret so the Vietnamese survivors could be interviewed by the police.

Wong was found dead from a self-inflicted gunshot wound, in the first-floor classroom with his victims. Items found on Wong's body included a hunting knife in the waistband of his pants; a bag of ammunition which was tied around his neck; and two semi-automatic pistols (a .45-caliber Beretta Px4 Storm and a 9mm Beretta 92FS Vertec Inox matching the serial numbers on his New York State pistol license). Also found at the scene were a number of loaded magazines, at least two empty magazines with a 30-round capacity each, and a firearm laser sight.

By 2:33 p.m., SWAT had completed the clearing of the building, and all those inside had been evacuated.

== Victims ==
Wong killed 13 people and critically wounded four. An account of each of the victims was published in The New York Times on April 6, 2009. Eight were residents of Binghamton, three were from Endicott, one was from Endwell, and one was from Greene.

=== Killed ===
- Parveen Ali, age 26, an immigrant from northern Pakistan
- Almir Olímpio Alves, age 43, a visiting scholar of Brazil's University of Pernambuco at Binghamton University, attending English classes at the Civic Association
- Marc Henry Bernard, age 44, an immigrant from Haiti, married to Maria
- Maria Sonia Bernard, age 46, an immigrant from Haiti, married to Marc
- Li Guo, age 47, a visiting scholar of China's Shenzhen University at Binghamton University
- Lan Ho, age 39, an immigrant from Vietnam
- Layla Khalil, age 53, a mother of three children who immigrated from Iraq
- Roberta Badaines King, age 72, an English as a second language substitute teacher
- Jiang Ling, age 22, an immigrant from China
- Hong Xiu Mao, age 35, a nail technician who also immigrated from China in 2006
- Dolores "Doris" Carbonilas Yigal, age 53, an immigrant from the Philippines
- Haihong Zhong, age 54, an immigrant from China
- Maria "Mima" Zobniw, age 60, a part-time caseworker at the Civic Association, originally from Austria born to Ukrainian parents

=== Wounded ===
The injured were treated for gunshot wounds at Wilson Medical Center in Johnson City and Our Lady of Lourdes Memorial Hospital in Binghamton.

- Shirley DeLucia, age 61, the Civic Association receptionist who feigned death and contacted police
- Long Huynh, age 42, a Vietnamese immigrant whose wife, Lan Ho, was killed. Huynh had tried to shield her with his body, but a bullet that shattered Huynh's elbow ricocheted, striking and killing his wife. Huynh was wounded three more times: he lost a finger to a shot, was hit by a bullet in his chest, and another bullet entered his chin and exited through his cheek.

== Perpetrator ==
Undated mugshot of Wong provided by Binghamton police

Jiverly Antares Wong (born Linh Phat Voong, Vietnamese: Huỳnh Linh Phát; December 8, 1967 – April 3, 2009), a resident of Johnson City, New York, was identified as the perpetrator.

Wong was born in South Vietnam as the second of four children into a Buddhist ethnic Chinese family, which the online US-based news blog Bolsavik identified as Chinese Nùng, based on the spelling of their surname. His father was a captain in the South Vietnamese Army. Wong and his parents, Henry Voong and Mui Thong, emigrated from Saigon in June 1990, arriving in the United States the following month, where their surname was romanized as Voong. Initially living in Binghamton with his parents and siblings, within a year, he moved out of the family home to a separate apartment in Binghamton, finding employment at Felchar Manufacturer. A few months later, he moved to the Los Angeles area in 1991. Between the 1990s and 2000s, Wong regularly traveled back and forth between Los Angeles and New York, though without visiting his family.

In California, Wong was arrested twice, once in 1991 for an unknown charge and a second time in 1992, this time leading to a conviction on a misdemeanor charge of fraud for forgery. Wong became a naturalized American citizen in November 1995, changing his name from Linh Phat Voong to Jiverly Antares Wong shortly after, reasoning that "Americans can't pronounce my real name", though he also used the name Jiverly Voong as an alias, retaining an identity card with this spelling. In February and June 1997, he registered guns in Broome County, New York, where he became a member of two shooting clubs. Shortly after, he acquired another gun license in California. In August 1998, while living in Johnson City, Wong filed a report with police, claiming someone had broken into his apartment through a damaged window. It was determined that the window pane may have popped out of its frame due to wear and as there were no other signs of a break-in, the matter was not further investigated. Two days later, Wong was fined $20 for driving an uninspected vehicle.

In 1999, New York State Police received a report by an informant that Wong was planning a bank robbery, which also alleged that he had a crack cocaine addiction and owned several handguns. Wong was not further investigated and no robbery occurred. Wong left the U.S. the same year for Tokyo, only to re-enter on December 25, 1999. Two days before his return, Wong married Xiu Ping Jiang. In 2000, Wong moved to Inglewood, California, residing on Century Boulevard between September 2000 and September 2007, being noted once by police for a fender bender traffic incident. Wong worked for almost seven years as a delivery man for Kikka Sushi, a catering company located in Los Angeles. In May 2005, Wong and his wife separated, with her filing for divorce in July 2005, which was granted in July 2006, citing irreconcilable differences.

Wong failed to show up to work one day in July 2007. The same year, he moved back with his parents, now living in Union, telling his father he had been fired from his job as a truck driver. However, co-workers stated that Wong had quit the job without any reason. Later, he called the company to get a copy of his W-2 earnings statement in 2008, asking that it be forwarded to a New York state address. Wong worked at a local Shop-Vac vacuum cleaner plant until it closed in November 2008. By that point, Wong had again started visiting shooting ranges in Binghamton.

After losing his job, Wong had regular appointments at Binghamton's employment center to receive his Trade Adjustment Assistance. On his first visit in November 2008, he left the center in anger after the receptionist, intending to call a translator, asked him if he was Chinese or Japanese. The center suggested that Wong take English classes to improve work prospects and subsequently enrolled at a language course at the ACA immigration center in January 2009, attending the same class as two of his later victims, Long Huynh and Lan Ho, with the former recalling that despite also being Vietnamese, Wong hardly spoke during the courses. His attendance was intermittent, and he stopped coming altogether in March 2009. He shot the students and teacher in the classroom where he had formerly attended sessions.

=== Possible motives ===
Several sources suggested possible motives for Wong's attack, including feelings of being "degraded and disrespected" for his poor English language skills, depression over losing his job, and difficulty in finding work in New York. Neighbors additionally suspected that Wong had an addiction to drugs. Binghamton Police Chief Joseph Zikuski said, "From the people close to him ... this action he took was not a surprise to them." Former coworkers stated that Wong talked about assassinating Barack Obama and once said, in response to a question if he liked the New York Yankees, "No, I don't like that team. I don't like America. America sucks.".

==== Package mailed to TV station ====
Several days after the shooting, an envelope was received by the Syracuse, New York, TV station News 10 Now dated March 18, 2009, and postmarked April 3, 2009, the day of the shooting. The three stamps used for the postage were a Liberty Bell and two Purple Hearts.

The package contained a two-page handwritten letter; photos of Wong, holding guns while smiling; a gun permit; and Wong's driver's license. Of the letter itself, most of its content was a rambling, paranoid accusation of perceived police misconduct and persecution of him, especially through "secret" visits to his residences. According to the housekeeper of Wong's apartment complex in California, between 2006 and 2007, a group of suited men visited the apartment building a few times to ask about Wong, and while they were described as resembling government agents, the FBI stated that it had no knowledged of prior investigations involving Wong. The letter also complained about the New York State Department of Labor, claiming that they had failed to provide him with unemployment benefits for a month. At the end of the letter, Wong stated that he "must [get] at least two people with me go to return to the dust of earth [sic]", blaming police for his actions, writing "Cop bring about this shooting. Cop must responsible [sic]".

== Aftermath ==
The shooting was the deadliest mass shooting in Binghamton's history, although not the deadliest mass casualty incident overall in the city, which was the 1913 Binghamton Factory fire with 31 deaths.

The Binghamton shooting was the eighth high-profile mass shooting in the United States since March 10, 2009, all having occurred within less than a month, leading to a renewed debate about gun control measures that members of the Democratic Party had previously proposed. Former Rochester County prosecutor Jeffrey Chamberlain commented that Wong "fell through the cracks" while Binghamton Police Chief Zikuski stated that there was "no merit" to reviewing Wong's gun permits after the alleged robbery tip-off in 1999. There was criticism against the Binghamton police department for waiting 45 minutes while on-site before entering the premises. The New York Daily News wrote in the department's defense that autopsies determined all fatalities had sustained injuries which resulted in death before the emergency response.

Although early reports suggested Wong had recently lost his job at a local IBM plant in nearby Endicott, New York, IBM said they had no records showing Wong had ever worked for the company. However, a former IBM worker claimed Wong, whom she knew as "Vaughn", had been employed as an engineer by the company several years earlier, stating "He was quiet—not a violent person" and "I can't believe he would do something like this." A different employee clarified that there was a contract worker with a similar name at the IBM plant, but that this person was still employed and working there during the shooting.

Press TV noted that Pakistani Taliban leader Baitullah Mehsud claimed responsibility for the shooting, saying, "They were my men. I gave them orders in reaction to US drone attacks." However, a spokesman for the Federal Bureau of Investigation discounted the claim as inconsistent with their evidence that Wong was the lone gunman.

President Barack Obama referred to the shooting as "senseless violence" and offered sympathy to the victims. New York Governor David Paterson ordered state flags to be flown at half staff on April 8, 2009.

Wong's parents, Henry Voong and Mui Thong of Johnson City, New York, issued a statement apologizing for their son's actions, expressing their shared grief and asking for forgiveness from the victims' families.

Following the publication of Wong's personal details, reporters attempted to find Wong's ex-wife, Xiu Ping Jiang, for comment. A Chinese woman with the same name, who had married a Vietnamese man in Des Moines, Iowa, was identified in an immigration jail in Glades County, Florida, but a background check determined her to be a different person. However, information about this Xiu Ping Jiang's immigration process generated sympathy about unfair treatment following coverage by The New York Times in September 2009. The journalist behind the article, Nina Bernstein, criticized that her case was ignored by the press after the supposed connection to the Binghamton shooting was found to be wrong, writing "Had she been the Xiu Ping Jiang linked to a mass killer, her story would have made instant news around the world. Instead, she is a kind of Internet-era doppelganger, lost in one of the dark places of immigration law, where the only life at stake may be her own". She was subsequently granted a second process under consideration of her mental health issues, receiving asylum in 2010. The events of Xiu Ping Jiang's immigration case became the basis of Lisa Ko's 2017 novel The Leavers.

In 2010, ahead of the one-year anniversary, a memorial was officially announced to commemorate the victims. In spring 2013, the ACA Memorial Park was constructed, funded by $200,000 paid by public donations and the victims' families. The center of the park features thirteen memorial plaques and an equal number of dove statues. In 2019, Binghamton University planned to build a mosaic at the entrance of the ACA center as part of a PwC honors program, which was suspended due to the COVID-19 pandemic, but construction took place in April 2021. Yearly memorial services for the shooting's victims are held in the park.

== See also ==
- Gun violence in the United States
- Mass shootings in the United States
