= March for Our Lives Seattle =

2018 protest in Seattle, Washington, U.S.

- Date: March 24, 2018
- Venue: Cal Anderson Park (start) to Seattle Center (end)
- Location: Seattle, Washington, U.S.; 47.617°N 122.319°W
- Type: Protest, march
- Theme: Gun control reform
- Cause: Parkland high school shooting
- Organized by: Emilia Allard; Rhiannon Rasaretnam; Lina Waughman; Catherine Zhu
- Participants: 50,000

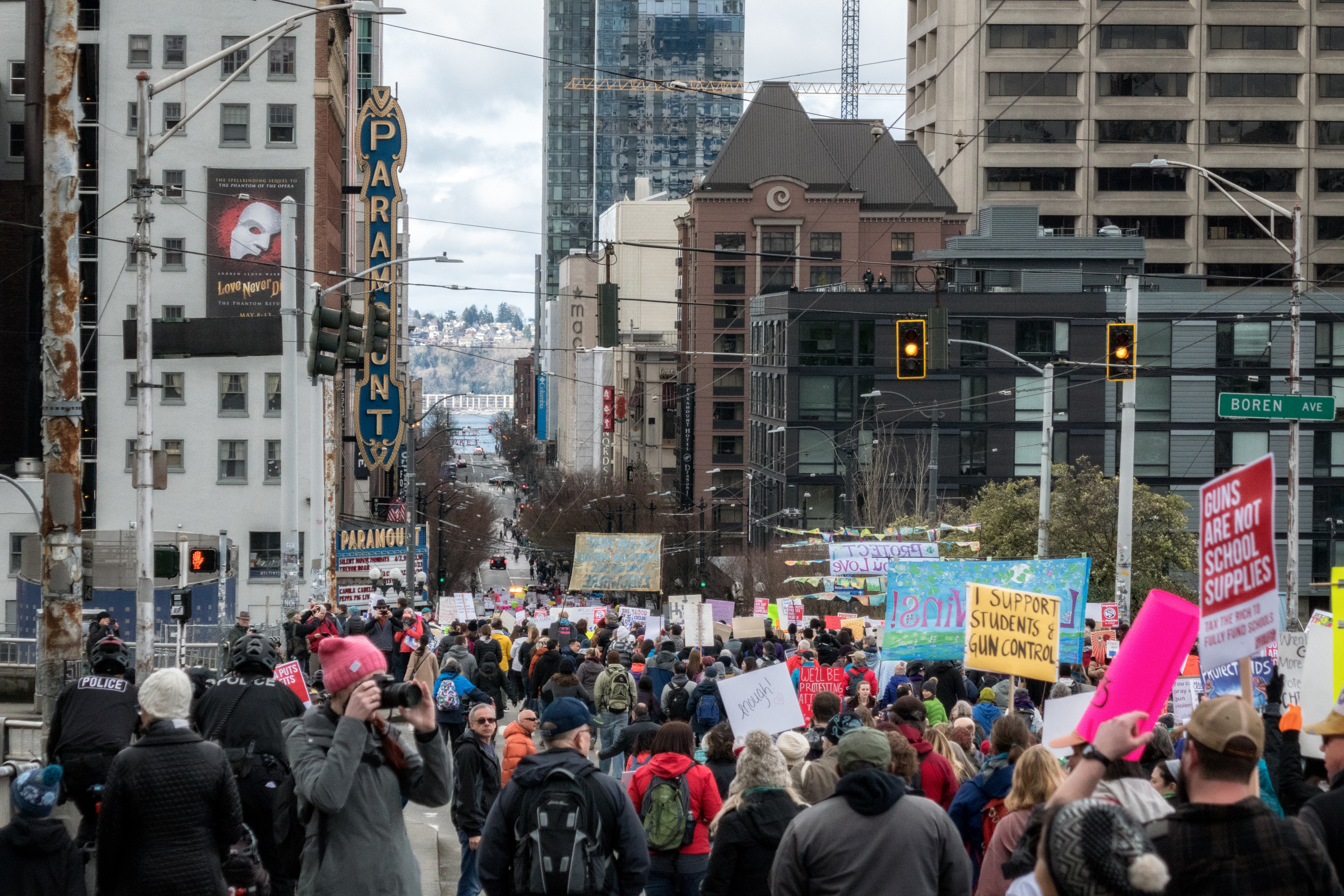
Participants marching to the Seattle Center

March for Our Lives Seattle was a protest march for gun control reform held in Seattle on March 24, 2018, in conjunction with March for Our Lives, a student-led initiative in response to the Parkland high school shooting. Part of a series of rallies and marches in more than 800 cities across the United States and other parts of the world, estimates indicated as many as 50,000 people participated in Seattle.

The protest received support from Seattle Public Schools. King County Council passed a March for Our Lives motion.

== Local organizers and planning ==
Local organizers included Emilia Allard, Rhiannon Rasaretnam, Lina Waughman, and Catherine Zhu. Students raised approximately $40,000 via GoFundMe for permits and security.

Lyft offered free transportation to Cal Anderson Park for participants. Metro and Sound Transit made plans for increased service.

== Demonstration ==
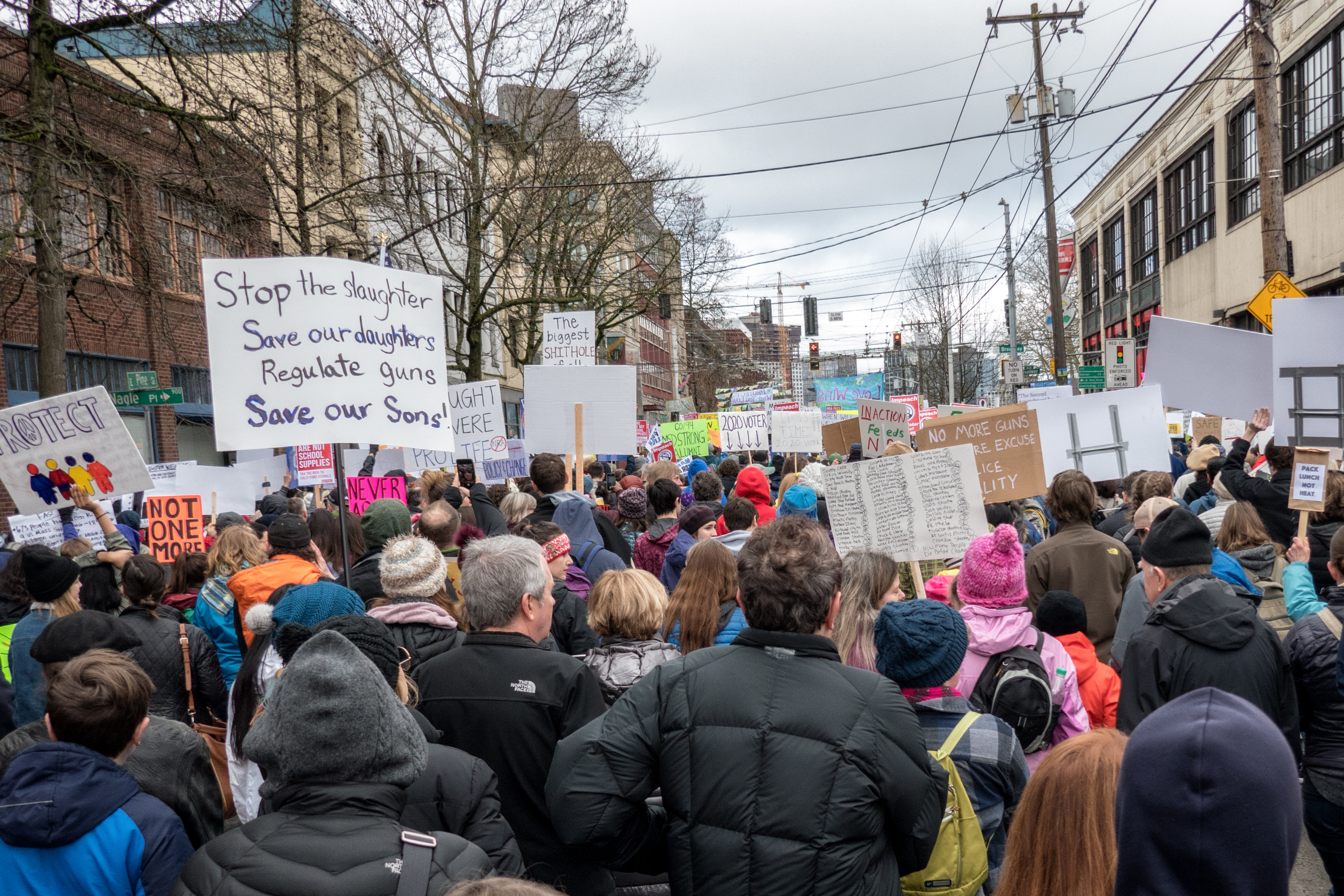
Participants near the intersection of Pine Street and Broadway

People gathered at Cal Anderson Park on Capitol Hill and marched through downtown Seattle to the Seattle Center via Pine Street and Fourth Avenue.

Speakers and performers included Governors Jay Inslee and Dan Malloy, state attorney general Bob Ferguson, Brandi Carlile, and Dave Matthews. Carlile performed "The Joke", a cover of Bob Dylan's "The Times They Are a'Changin' ", and "Hold Out Your Hand". Maria Cantwell also attended.

Thousands of people participated in the demonstration. Crowd estimates were as high as 50,000.

== See also ==
- List of March for Our Lives locations
