= List of March for Our Lives locations =

This is an incomplete list of March for Our Lives events that took place on March 24, 2018. The official March for Our Lives event in Washington, D.C., attracted a turnout of between 200,000 to 800,000 on March 24, 2018. This is a partial list. Overall turnout was estimated to be between 1.2 and 2 million people in the United States, making it one of the largest protests in American history.

== United States ==
Listed below are locations where there have been rallies or marches in the U.S. in support of the March for Our Lives.

- AL
- AK
- AZ
- AR
- CA
- CO
- CT
- DC
- DE
- FL
- GA
- GU
- HI
- ID
- IL
- IN
- IA
- KS
- KY
- LA
- ME
- MD
- MA
- MI
- MN
- MS
- MO
- MT
- NE
- NV
- NH
- NJ
- NM
- NY
- NC
- ND
- OH
- OK
- OR
- PA
- PR
- RI
- SC
- SD
- TN
- TX
- UT
- USVI
- VT
- VA
- WA
- WV
- WI
- WY

| State | Photo | Approximate attendance | Notes |
|---|---|---|---|
| Washington, D.C. | | In Washington, D.C., an estimated 200,000 to 800,000 people attended the "standing-room-only rally" on Pennsylvania Avenue. | In a March 24, 2018 article, Time magazine reported the estimate by event organizers as about 800,000 people, as did NBC News and The Hill. At that time police officials had not released an official crowd size estimate. Law enforcement had "prepared for 500,000." The Time article also said that the event "brought downtown Washington to a standstill...[f]rom the foot of the Capitol to the White House more than a mile west, Pennsylvania Avenue and its tributaries". Speakers included Marjory Stoneman Douglas students Cameron Kasky, David Hogg, and Emma González. The New Yorker's Margaret Talbot, who attended the event, said that its most remarkable aspect was its inclusiveness, not just its extraordinary, impressive size and "consistent demand for a ban on assault-style weapons, or the focus on defeating politicians who take money from the National Rifle Association." |

| State | Cities | Photo | Approximate attendance | Notes |
|---|---|---|---|---|
| Alabama | Birmingham | | 5,000 | Birmingham's Railroad Park |
| Alabama | Dothan | | 150-200 | Porter Park - Kinney Park |
| Alabama | Florence | | 100-200 | Wilson Park. |
| Alabama | Jasper | | ~70 | Courthouse Square. |
| Alabama | Mobile | | 500 | Public Safety Memorial Park. |
| Alabama | Montgomery | | 200 | Many people, mostly children and families, gathered at the Alabama State Capitol on Saturday. |
| Alabama | Selma | | dozens | Edmund Pettus Bridge. |
| Alaska | Anchorage | | 1,000–1,500 | Hundreds of people attended the event at the Delaney Park Strip. |
| Alaska | Bethel | | 30 | Demonstrators walked along the shoulder of Chief Eddie Hoffman Highway. |
| Alaska | Fairbanks | | 200 | Golden Heart Plaza. |
| Alaska | Homer | | 60 | WKFL park |
| Alaska | Juneau | | 200 | People gathered outside the Juneau offices of Sens. Lisa Murkowski and Dan Sullivan, both NRA supporters, before marching to the State Capitol Building. |
| Alaska | Ketchikan | | 50 | Berth 2, 131 Front Street |
| Alaska | Sitka | | 1 | One lone protester stood in the roundabout for about three hours bearing a sign that said "Books, Not Bullets." |
| Alaska | Soldotna | | 50 | Marchers walked along Kenai Spur Highway to the Kenai Peninsula Borough building. |
| Alaska | Utqiaġvik | | 14 | Whalebone arch - Tuzzy Library. The Utqiaġvik demonstration was the northernmost gun-control march in the U.S. |
| Arizona | Bisbee | | 30 | Ironman Statue - Old Bisbee. |
| Arizona | Flagstaff | | 750–1,000 | lawn of Flagstaff City Hall |
| Arizona | Kingman | | 100 | Locomotive Park - Mohave County Courthouse and Jail. In spite of a heated confrontation with 20 gun-rights counter-protesters across Route 66 near the Kingman Powerhouse, the demonstration was mostly peaceful. |
| Arizona | Lake Havasu City | | dozens | Wheeler Park - London Bridge |
| Arizona | Nogales | | 50+ | Nogales Mercado Farmer's Market (steps away from a legal port of entry with Mexico) |
| Arizona | Payson | | 100+ | gathering near Arizona State Route 260 and the Beeline Highway. |
| Arizona | Phoenix | | 15,000 | Arizona State Capitol. According to the Arizona Department of Public Safety, the march crowd in Phoenix totaled 15,000. There were also a "few dozen" counter-protesters, some with Second Amendment signs and others with AR-15s and other weapons in attendance. |
| Arizona | Prescott | | 1,500+ | Yavapai County Courthouse Plaza |
| Arizona | Sahuarita | | 400+ | People gathered in front of Sahuarita High School. |
| Arizona | Sedona | | ~hundreds | "Huge turnout" at Sedona Red Rock High School |
| Arizona | Show Low | | 100 | Demonstrators lined the main street in Show Low. |
| Arizona | Sierra Vista | | 200 | March to US Rep. Martha McSally's office. |
| Arizona | Tucson | | 7,000–8,000 | Jacome Plaza - UA Mall. |
| Arizona | Yuma | | 100+ | Marcus Park - Yuma City Hall |
| Arkansas | Bentonville | | 450 | The event was held in Bentonville Square. |
| Arkansas | Eureka Springs | | 20 | Basin Spring Park |
| Arkansas | Fort Smith | | 200+ | Sebastian County Courthouse |
| Arkansas | Jonesboro | | 100+ | Jonesboro High School - Craighead County Courthouse. The march also observed the 20th anniversary of the 1998 Westside Middle School shooting. |
| Arkansas | Little Rock | | 3,000–3,500 | Arkansas State Capitol. |
| Arkansas | Springdale | | 150–200 | Approximately 150–200 people convened at Walter Turnbow Park at Shiloh Square. |
| California | Alameda | | 500+ | Park Street & Santa Clara Ave - Big Five Sporting Goods Store at South Shore Center |
| California | Aptos | | hundreds | Aptos Village Park - State Park Drive overpass. |
| California | Arcata | | 1,000+ | Arcata Playhouse - Arcata Plaza. |
| California | Avalon | | 52 | march on Catalina Island |
| California | Bakersfield | | 500+ | Yokuts Park - Empire Drive & Truxtun Avenue |
| California | Benicia | | 800–1,500 | Benicia's March for Our Lives, reportedly the first in town since World War II, headed down First Street to City Park. Benicia Mayor Elizabeth Patterson & Vice Mayor of Benicia Steve Young were present. |
| California | Bishop | | | event planned at Bishop City Park |
| California | Brea | | hundreds | At the Brea March, students registered to vote. |
| California | Burbank | | 4,000 | US Reps. Adam Schiff and Laura Friedman spoke at the event at Chandler Bikeway. |
| California | Burlingame | | 400 | Washington Park - Burlingame Train Station. |
| California | Chico | | hundreds | Chico City Plaza. "I was born after Columbine," said the organizer of the event. |
| California | Coulterville | | | event planned at intersection of Hwys 49 and 132 |
| California | Encinitas | | 1,500 | Swami State Beach - Moonlight Beach. |
| California | Escondido | | 500 | Escondido City Hall. |
| California | Fresno | | 2,000+ | Protesters, led by young high school students, gathered at Fresno High School. |
| California | Hemet | | 300+ | Gibbel Park. |
| California | Huntington Beach | | 2,000 | Lake Park - City Hall. |
| California | Idyllwild | | dozens | The Harmony Monument |
| California | Irvine | | ~hundreds | event held down Michelson Drive |
| California | Laguna Beach | | hundreds | Main Beach. This rally was lined along the South Coast Highway without music or speeches, but just with signs, and honks of sympathy from drivers. |
| California | Lancaster | | ~400 | event held at American Heroes Park |
| California | Livermore / Tri-Valley | | 1,000+ | Livermore High School football field. Organizers included prominent student advocates from local schools as well as high schools in Pleasanton and Dublin. The rally was preceded by a town hall meeting with US. Rep Eric Swalwell, attended by about fifty people. |
| California | Lompoc | | 250 | corner of H Street and Ocean Street |
| California | Long Beach | | 5,000 | Bixby Park. |
| California | Los Angeles | | 55,000–60,000 | Thousands of students, children, parents and grandchildren walked from Pershing Square to Grand Park, where they were greeted by L.A. Mayor Eric Garcetti. Celebrity speakers & participants included Amy Schumer, Olivia Wilde, Yara Shahidi, Connie Britton, Skai Jackson, Meg Donnelly, Ta'Rhonda Jones, Laura Dern, Reese Witherspoon, Frances Fisher, Nick Offerman, Jason Sudeikis, Cappie Pondexter, Jacob Sartorius, Trevor Hall, Mason Cook & Bret Lockett. At the end of the march, Rita Ora sang a rendition of the 1960s protest song "For What It's Worth." |
| California | Manhattan Beach | | 5,000+ | Manhattan Beach Pier - Hermosa Beach pier. |
| California | Menlo Park | | 150-200 | Art Ventures gallery - Hillview Middle School |
| California | Merced | | 150+ | Boys & Girls Club of Merced - Court House Square Park. |
| California | Modesto | | 700+ | Demonstrators gathered at Graceada Park, and then marched 1.7 miles (a tenth of a mile for each life lost in the Stoneman Douglas High School shooting) before returning to the Park. |
| California | Monterey | | 1,000 | Window on the Bay Park - Colton Hall. |
| California | Morgan Hill | | 400 | Community and Cultural Center. |
| California | Napa | | several hundred | Residents gathered in an auditorium for a panel discussion with US Rep Mike Thompson, Napa Mayor Jill Techel and others. |
| California | Novato | | 800+ | Novato City Hall |
| California | Oakland | | 2,000 | Frank Ogawa Plaza - Lake Merritt |
| California | Pacifica | | 420+ | Pacifica State Beach Taco Bell - Rockaway Beach |
| California | Palm Springs | | 2,000–3,000 | Palm Springs High School's football stadium - Palm Springs City Hall (10 am). Palm Springs Mayor Robert Moon was absent from the morning march, and protesters were even more disappointed to learn that he refused to sign a proclamation against gun violence written by event organizer Richard Noble. Moon responded by saying that he would want the city council to approve and sign it first, before he would do so as a council representative. However, Moon did attend the afternoon rally at Frances Stevens Park (4 pm) as a private citizen. |
| California | Pico Rivera | | 200+ | El Rancho High School |
| California | Redding | | 600+ | A small crowd of about a dozen marched from Enterprise High School to Redding City Hall. A much larger second march began with a student rally at the Riverfront Park Amphitheater at 6 pm, and ended at Hilltop Drive. |
| California | Redwood City | | 4,000 | Courthouse Square. |
| California | Richmond | | hundreds | Nevin Plaza - City Hall. |
| California | Ridgecrest | | 50 | Ridgecrest City Hall. |
| California | Riverside | March for Our Lives, Riverside | 4,000+ | Riverside Historic Courthouse |
| California | Rocklin | | hundreds | Rocklin Unified School District offices - Quarry Park. |
| California | Sacramento | | 6,000 | Crocker Park - California State Capitol. Sacramento Mayor Darrell Steinberg was present. This crowd in particular was reeling from the recent police shooting of 22-year-old Stephon Clark, whose iPhone had been mistaken for a weapon. |
| California | San Bernardino | | 600+ | down North D Street |
| California | San Clemente | | 1,500 | San Clemente Public Library - Avenida Del Mar |
| California | San Diego | | 5,000–10,000 | Protesters assembled in Waterfront Park. Australian stand-up comedian Jim Jefferies, best known for his material on gun control in 2012, paid a visit to the San Diego rally c/o his show on Comedy Central. |
| California | San Francisco | | at least 45,000 | Civic Center Plaza (voter registration); march down Market Street, from San Francisco City Hall to the Ferry Building, Embarcadero Plaza. US Sen. Dianne Feinstein, San Francisco Mayor Mark Farrell and Board of Supervisors President London Breed were among the adult speakers who declared their support for the youth leading the anti-gun movement. |
| California | San Jose | | 5,000 | City Hall - Arena Green. Rep. Zoe Lofgren (D-San Jose) said the student-led movement will “lead our country in a better direction.” A man was arrested for bringing a loaded, unregistered handgun; "Based on his statements it seems he was supportive of the demonstration, and brought [the gun] for his safety [against any violent and armed interlopers]" said the police. |
| California | San Leandro | | 400+ | The Community Impact Lab hosted the event at Washington Elementary School, and led a march up Dutton Avenue, down Bancroft Avenue to John Muir Middle School and back to Washington Elementary where speakers addressed the crowd. |
| California | San Luis Obispo | | thousands | Mitchell Park; event organized by Together We Will SLO and Women's March SLO |
| California | San Mateo | | 1,000+ | Beresford Park. Voter registration booths were present for high school students, and over 60 people then took the train to San Francisco's sister rally. |
| California | Santa Ana | | 5,000+ | Centennial Regional Park. California Lt. Gov. Gavin Newsom, who was running for Governor, touted Proposition 63, which he proposed and campaigned for, as California's answer to the NRA's sway over federal gun policy. |
| California | Santa Barbara | | 1,200+ | De La Guerra Plaza |
| California | Santa Clarita | | hundreds | Bridgeport Park. |
| California | Santa Maria | | 120+ | Santa Maria High School. |
| California | Santa Monica | | 1,000+ | Montana Ave - Palisades Park on Ocean Avenue |
| California | Santa Rosa | | 2,000 | Old Courthouse Square. |
| California | Sebastopol | | 75 | Downtown Plaza |
| California | Sonoma | | 1,000 | Sonoma Plaza. |
| California | Sonora | | 300+ | Sonora High School - Courthouse Square. |
| California | Stockton | | 400 | Martin Luther King Jr. Plaza |
| California | Tehachapi | | 100+ | intersection of Tucker Road and Valley Boulevard. |
| California | Temecula | | 100 | Temecula Duck Pond. |
| California | Truckee | | 130 | Truckee River Regional Park, rodeo staging area. |
| California | Turlock | | 200+ | corner of Monte Vista Avenue and Geer Road. - CSU Stanislaus |
| California | Ukiah | | 600 | Alex R. Thomas Jr. Plaza. |
| California | Upland | | | event planned at the corner of 8th and Mountain |
| California | Vallejo | | 300–400 | Vallejo City Hall. A separate event was held in the evening at Mare Island. |
| California | Ventura | | 1,000 | Ventura Plaza Park. |
| California | Victorville | | 150+ | Victorville Park N Ride - Mojave Vista Park |
| California | Visalia | | hundreds | College of the Sequoias, Mooney Blvd & Highway 198 - Redwood High School |
| California | Walnut Creek | | ~hundreds | event held at Civic Park |
| California | Weaverville | | dozens | Bandstand - Trinity Congregational Church. |
| California | Weed | | 50 | Bel Air Park - Weed High School. |
| Colorado | Basalt | | 300 | Lions Park |
| Colorado | Carbondale | | 100–200 | The Goat - Main Street |
| Colorado | Colorado Springs | | 2,000 | Acacia Park |
| Colorado | Cortez | | 250 | Cortez City Park |
| Colorado | Crested Butte | | 50 | Four Way Stop - Town Hall (via Elk Avenue) |
| Colorado | Denver | | 100,000+ | Denver Civic Center. US Sen. Michael Bennet and US Rep. Diana DeGette were present. |
| Colorado | Durango | | 1,300 | Durango High School - Rotary Park |
| Colorado | Fort Collins | | 1,000 | Old Town Square |
| Colorado | Grand Junction | | few hundred | Lincoln Park - Grand Junction City Hall |
| Colorado | Gunnison | | 20 | The march started and ended at the Legion Park Pavilion. |
| Colorado | Longmont | | 1,000 | Safety and Justice Center & Civic Center |
| Colorado | Pueblo | | 200 | Robert Hoag Rawlings Public Library |
| Colorado | Steamboat Springs | | hundreds | Routt County Courthouse. Two passing drivers were ticketed by police for "rolling coal" (deliberately spewing exhaust) at protesters during the rally. |
| Colorado | Vail | | 300 | Vail Village - Lionshead Village |
| Connecticut | East Haddam | | 300 | Two Wrasslin’ Cats; This rally was more like a vigil. |
| Connecticut | Enfield | | 200+ | Town Green - Enfield High School |
| Connecticut | Guilford | | 2,300 | About 500 people gathered on the Guilford Green a half hour before the rally & march officially got started, by which time the crowd grew to thousands. US Sen. Chris Murphy addressed the crowd. |
| Connecticut | Hartford | | 11,000 | US Sen. Richard Blumenthal attended many gun control rallies across Connecticut, including this one at Bushnell Park, outside the Connecticut State Capitol. |
| Connecticut | Kent | | 500+ | Town Hall - Main Street. |
| Connecticut | Middlebury | | | Middlebury Green |
| Connecticut | Old Saybrook | | hundreds | 302 Main Street |
| Connecticut | Roxbury | | 500 | Booth Free School - Minor Memorial Library - Roxbury Green |
| Connecticut | Salisbury | | 200 | Salisbury Green - Town Hall |
| Connecticut | Shelton | | hundreds | Veterans Memorial Park, Housatonic River |
| Connecticut | Stamford | | 2,000 | Mill River Park. Musician and New Canaan resident Paul Simon performed "The Sound of Silence." |
| Connecticut | Stonington | | 500+ | Stonington High School, Pawcatuck |
| Connecticut | Torrington | | two dozen | Torrington High School - Coe Park |
| Connecticut | Waterbury | | 12 | Downtown Waterbury and Liberty Park |
| Connecticut | Westport | | 1,000+ | Demonstrators held a candlelight vigil. |
| Connecticut | Winsted | | 18 | East End Park. |
| Delaware | Bethany Beach | | | Rte. 36 |
| Delaware | Lewes | | 500 | Shields Elementary School - St. Peter's Episcopal Church |
| Delaware | Rehoboth Beach | | 1,100+ | Stockley Street Park - Rehoboth Beach Bandstand. US Sen. Chris Coons & State Sen. Ernie Lopez spoke at the rally. |
| Delaware | Wilmington | | 400 | Howard High School of Technology - Rodney Square. In a surprise appearance at this rally, former U.S. Vice President Joe Biden said he skipped the DC rally in favor of his home state of Delaware, where gun violence is particularly rampant in Wilmington. |
| Florida | Apopka | | | The Learning Experience |
| Florida | Boca Raton | | 5,000 | Mizner Park Amphitheater. |
| Florida | Bowling Green | | 75 | Rally at New Life Power Outreach Center, where Bowling Green Mayor Sam Fite spoke; march route began at Palmetto Street and ended at Martin Luther King Drive. |
| Florida | Boynton Beach | | 500 | The Cascades |
| Florida | Bradenton | | nearly 1,000 | Riverwalk Mosaic Amphitheater - Manatee County Courthouse. |
| Florida | Clearwater | | | Pinellas Tax Collectors office |
| Florida | Dade City | | 125+ | Resurrection Park - Pasco County Courthouse; event hosted by Farmworkers Self-Help, Inc. |
| Florida | Daytona Beach | | 1,000 | intersection of International Speedway Boulevard and Beach Street. |
| Florida | Delray Beach | | 1,800–2,000 | Old School Square - march over the Atlantic Avenue bridge to the beach. |
| Florida | Doral | | 1,000+ | Downtown Doral Park. Weeks earlier, soon after the Parkland shooting, a "Three Billboards"-inspired campaign had been organized outside Sen. Marco Rubio's office in Doral, and in downtown Miami and Little Havana. |
| Florida | Fernandina Beach | | 1,200 | Fernandina Beach Marina; lawn next to Parking Lot C |
| Florida | Fort Lauderdale | | 567 | The New England Patriots loaned their jet to students of Marjory Stoneman Douglas High School (and their families) who wished to fly from Fort Lauderdale to the March for Our Lives rally in Washington, D.C. |
| Florida | Fort Myers | | 2,000 | Protesters marched to Old Lee County Courthouse. |
| Florida | Fort Walton Beach | | 450 | Liza Jackson Park - Fort Walton Landing, via U.S. Highway 98 |
| Florida | Gainesville | | several hundred | Bo Diddley Plaza |
| Florida | Gulf Breeze | | nearly 300 | Gulf Breeze High School, 675 Gulf Breeze Parkway |
| Florida | Jacksonville | | 1,000 | Hemming Park - Duval County Courthouse. Two weeks later, on April 7, a Town Hall meeting was held at Hyatt Regency Jacksonville |
| Florida | Jupiter | | 300–400 | Jupiter Community Center |
| Florida | Key West | | hundreds | Southernmost Beach, Duval St |
| Florida | Kissimmee | | | event planned at 1 Courthouse Square |
| Florida | Lake Wales | | 100+ | Lake Wales High School - downtown |
| Florida | Lakeland | | hundreds | Munn Park |
| Florida | Lakewood Ranch | | 300 | The Learning Experience |
| Florida | Madeira Beach | | | 15100 Gulf Blvd |
| Florida | Marathon | | | event planned at Marathon High School |
| Florida | Melbourne | | 7,000–8,000 | Thousands of Brevard County residents lined up and marched across the Eau Gallie Causeway & Bridge. |
| Florida | Miami Beach | | 3,000+ | Miami Beach Senior High School - Collins Park. Miami Beach Mayor Dan Gelber addressed the crowd, as did rapper Flo Rida and singer Emily Estefan. |
| Florida | Miami Lakes | | | |
| Florida | Mount Dora | | 200 | Gilbert Park. |
| Florida | Naples | | 3,000 | Cambier Park |
| Florida | New Smyrna Beach | | 1,000 | Riverside Park. |
| Florida | North Lauderdale | | 100+ | A two-mile walk began at North Lauderdale City Hall and ended at Hamptons Pines Park. |
| Florida | Ocala | | 500 | Downtown Historic Square |
| Florida | Oldsmar | | 30+ | The Learning Experience |
| Florida | Orlando | | 15,000–25,000 | Lake Eola Park - Orlando City Hall. |
| Florida | Palm Coast | | 50+ | intersection of Palm Coast Parkway and Boulder Rock Drive. |
| Florida | Palm Harbor | | 50–60 | roadside rally, 34330 US Hwy 19 N |
| Florida | Panama City | | 100 | Bay County Public Library - City Hall |
| Florida | Parkland | | 15,000–20,000 | Pine Trails Park; Parkland Mayor Christine Hunschofsky was present. According to the Associated Press, about 20,000 people attended the Parkland event; ABC reported 15,000. The city itself, where 17 students and teachers died, had a population of 31,500. |
| Florida | Pembroke Pines | | 1,500+ | Charles F. Dodge City Center - City Hall |
| Florida | Pensacola | | 500–1000 | Palafox St - Main St - Escambia County Judicial Center |
| Florida | Pinellas Park | | | Dead Friends’ Legacy Group |
| Florida | Plant City | | 60+ | Raiders Stadium, Plant City High School |
| Florida | Port St. Lucie | | 40+ | Port St. Lucie Civic Center |
| Florida | Punta Gorda | | 1,111 | Gilchrist Park - Barron Collier Bridge |
| Florida | St. Augustine | | 2,500–5000 | Davis Park - Bridge of Lions - Castillo de San Marcos National Monument |
| Florida | St. Petersburg | | 1,500 | Poynter Park, USFSP campus. |
| Florida | Sarasota | | 6,000–8,000 | Demonstrators gathered in an area near the Unconditional Surrender statue. |
| Florida | Sebastian | | 60+ | Indian River Drive |
| Florida | Stuart | | 500 | Martin County March for Our Lives, at Memorial Park bandshell |
| Florida | Tallahassee | | 2,500 | Officials at the Florida Capitol estimated the turnout at Saturday's rally to be around 2,500 people; an estimated 4,000 had attended the Capitol rally one week after the Valentine's Day shooting in Parkland. Yolanda Renee King, the 9-year-old granddaughter of Martin Luther King Jr., was "not shy about speaking," said her other grandfather (& Tallahassee resident) Arnold Waters. |
| Florida | Tampa | | 15,000 | Kiley Gardens - downtown Tampa. |
| Florida | Tavares | | 300 | Wooton Park - Old Lake County Courthouse. |
| Florida | The Villages | | ~1,000 | Lake Sumter Landing Market Square |
| Florida | West Palm Beach | | 3,500 | Dreher Park. This rally attempted to get President Trump's attention by lining his usual route from his golf club to his home in Palm Beach. But the president's motorcade took a longer route Saturday, avoiding the area of the protests. |
| Florida | Weston | | 450 | Weston Regional Park |
| (Georgia (U.S. state)) Georgia | Athens | | 400 | University of Georgia arch. |
| (Georgia (U.S. state)) Georgia | Atlanta | | 30,000 | National Center for Civil & Human Rights, near Centennial Olympic Park - Georgia State Capitol. Organizers had expected about 12,000 people; by day's end, police estimated attendance at 30,000. The office of Atlanta Mayor Keisha Lance Bottoms donated $20,000 to the event. Congressman and civil rights leader John Lewis was a keynote speaker at the Atlanta march, speaking about the gun murders of John F. Kennedy, Martin Luther King Jr., and Robert F. Kennedy. |
| (Georgia (U.S. state)) Georgia | Augusta | | ~140 (minimum total) | Two marches occurred in Augusta, GA. One began at Augusta Common and ended at Richmond County Board of Education. In the other event, March For Our Lives CSRA gathered outside the Columbia County Board of Education, then marched along Hereford Farm Road and Cox Road, ending at Evans High School. |
| (Georgia (U.S. state)) Georgia | Brunswick | | 200+ | Howard Coffin Park |
| (Georgia (U.S. state)) Georgia | Clarkesville | | 170 | 555 Monroe St |
| (Georgia (U.S. state)) Georgia | Columbus | | 300 | 1000 Broadway |
| (Georgia (U.S. state)) Georgia | Covington | | dozens | Covington Square |
| (Georgia (U.S. state)) Georgia | Dahlonega | | several hundred | Dahlonega Gold Museum Historic Site. |
| (Georgia (U.S. state)) Georgia | Dalton | | 300+ | Two weeks after the Parkland shooting, a Dalton High School teacher barricaded himself in a classroom and fired a shot through a window. |
| (Georgia (U.S. state)) Georgia | Ellenwood | | | Cedar Grove High School |
| (Georgia (U.S. state)) Georgia | Rome | | | Veterans Memorial Highway |
| (Georgia (U.S. state)) Georgia | Savannah | | 1,000+ | Wright Square - Forsyth Park |
| (Georgia (U.S. state)) Georgia | Statesboro | | 220–250 | gathering on the campus of Georgia Southern University. |
| (Georgia (U.S. state)) Georgia | Watkinsville | | 40+ | Oconee Veterans Park. |
| Hawaii | Hilo | | | sign-waving rally along Kanoelehua Ave across from Pince Kuhio Plaza between Hopaco and Puainako St intersection; event organized by the MoveOn Hamakua group |
| Hawaii | Honolulu | | 5,000 | Hawaii State Capitol |
| Hawaii | Kahului (Maui) | | 1,000 | Up to a thousand people gathered (in the rain) on the Great Lawn of the University of Hawaii Maui College; many of the marchers were on vacation from other states and researched when & where Maui's rally would take place. US Rep. Tulsi Gabbard launched the event with a moment of silence for the victims of Parkland. Later in the evening, an all-star benefit jam called the "Concert For Our Lives" was held at the Maui Arts & Cultural Center; about 5,500 people were expected to attend. The concert featured performances by Jack Johnson, Willie K, Kris Kristofferson, Mick Fleetwood, Willie Nelson and Steven Tyler, who were joined by many of the Hawaiian Islands' local top performers. US Sen. Mazie Hirono addressed the concert-goers: "This is a movement that will inspire a generation." |
| Hawaii | Kailua | | | Kailua Intermediate School. |
| Hawaii | Kauai | | 500 | Demonstrators gathered alongside Kuhio Highway while it was raining heavily. |
| Hawaii | Kilauea | | | Christ Memorial Episcopal Church. |
| Hawaii | Oahu | | 200 | Ala Moana Beach Park |
| Hawaii | Waimea | | 400+ | Church Row |
| Idaho | Boise | | 4,000–5,000 | Idaho State Capitol. |
| Idaho | Coeur d'Alene | | 450+ | McEuen Park. |
| Idaho | Idaho Falls | | 200 | Snake River Landing - Memorial Drive, by the river, opposite the courthouse |
| Idaho | Lewiston | | 150 | Brackenbury Square |
| Idaho | Moscow | | 950 | Friendship Square - East City Park |
| Idaho | Pocatello | | 200 | The Pocatello march, called 'March for Their Lives', was held one week after the national 'March For Our Lives' movement. |
| Idaho | Sandpoint | | 225–300 | City Beach. An opposing march called 'March for Our Rights' was also held on the same day, attracting 100 protesters (300 according to organizers) at Long Bridge. |
| Idaho | Twin Falls | | hundreds | Twin Falls County Courthouse. |
| Idaho | Victor | | 60+ | Victor City Park |
| Illinois | Bloomington–Normal | | hundreds | McLean County Museum of History - Bloomington Center for the Performing Arts. Despite the near white-out conditions, local activists were heart-warmed by the turnout. Nearly a dozen counterprotesters gathered downtown as well. |
| Illinois | Carbondale | | several hundred | Carbondale Community High School students, Maria Maring and Alexis Jones, led hundreds of protesters from the Downtown Pavilion. |
| Illinois | Champaign | | 700+ | Demonstrators gathered in the snow at Douglass Park. |
| Illinois | Charleston | | 100 | Doudna Fine Arts Center, Eastern Illinois University campus |
| Illinois | Chicago | | 200+ | (Mar 23) On Friday afternoon in West Humboldt Park, more than 200 students from Rowe-Clark Math & Science Academy held their own March for Our Lives along Chicago Avenue. |
| Illinois | Chicago | | 85,000 | Union Park; organizers had expected 15,000 people to show up. Numerous dignitaries participated in the march, including US Senator Dick Durbin; Chicago Mayor Rahm Emanuel was currently in Puerto Rico aiding in hurricane relief efforts. |
| Illinois | Decatur | | 150 | Demonstrators marched in the rain from Decatur Civic Center to Old King's Orchard Community Center. A silent vigil was then held at the community center. |
| Illinois | Downers Grove | | 1,000+ | A line of shoulder-to-shoulder marchers spanned Main Street from Downes Grove North High School to the train station. |
| Illinois | Elgin | | hundreds | Gail Borden Public Library - Township Building |
| Illinois | Evanston | | 85 | Residents of The Mather, a senior living community, marched from their community to Fountain Square. |
| Illinois | Frankfort | | 400 | Breidert Green Park |
| Illinois | Galesburg | | 100 | lawn of the Knox County Courthouse |
| Illinois | Glen Ellyn | | 1,000–2,000 | Lincoln Elementary School - Glenbard West High School. |
| Illinois | Huntley | | 200 | March in Deckie Park |
| Illinois | Macomb | | 80+ | McDonough County courthouse |
| Illinois | O'Fallon | | 400 | gathering across the street from City Hall |
| Illinois | Oswego | | 200 | Approximately 200 protesters lined up along Route 71 in front of Oswego High School. Four counter-protesters holding signs such as "Guns Save Lives" were stationed nearby, as was a small group of anti-abortion protesters across the street. |
| Illinois | Peoria | | 300 | outside the Gateway Building. |
| Illinois | Rockford | | hundreds | march along Wayman Street to Davis Park. |
| Illinois | Schaumburg | | 400–600 | Schaumburg Town Square - Schaumburg Prairie Center for the Arts. Students and politicians spoke at the rally, including Democratic state Reps Michelle Mussman and Jonathan Carroll, as well as state Sen. Tom Rooney, a Republican. |
| Illinois | Skokie | | 100+ | Jewish students hosted the Shabbat Observant March For Our Lives outside Skokie Valley Synagogue; over 100 people marched along McCormick Boulevard at Dempster Street. |
| Illinois | Springfield | | 400 | Organizers had predicted that some 500 people would attend in the intermittent, cold rain, with temperatures hovering around 38 degrees, at the Abraham Lincoln statue in front of the Illinois Statehouse. |
| Illinois | Vernon Hills | | few hundred | Hawthorn Middle School. US Rep Brad Schneider spoke to the large crowd prior to the march. |
| Illinois | Woodstock | | 1,000 | McHenry County protest at Woodstock Square |
| Indiana | Bloomington | | 100+ | Monroe County Courthouse - Kirkwood Ave |
| Indiana | Columbus | | 60 | Demonstrators gathered in front of Columbus City Hall while it was snowing. They then marched around the Bartholomew County Courthouse. |
| Indiana | East Chicago | | 80 | People gathered for a "Youth Speak Rally" at Unity Plaza in the Indiana Harbor. |
| Indiana | Evansville | | 500 | First Presbyterian Church |
| Indiana | Fort Wayne | | 400 | Allen County Courthouse green; Fort Wayne Mayor Tom Henry was present. |
| Indiana | Goshen | | 400+ | Goshen Courthouse |
| Indiana | Highland | | 200 | Main Square Park |
| Indiana | Indianapolis | | several thousand | Hundreds of people (mostly high school students) gathered outside the State House, in the snow, while thousands more congregated inside (organizers said the building can hold up to 6,000). Speakers included US Rep André Carson & US Sen. Joe Donnelly. Social media reacted to the presence of an unidentified man in a hunting cap with an AR-15 hung on his shoulder, confronting the crowd. |
| Indiana | Jasper | | 100 | Jasper Middle School |
| Indiana | New Albany | | 100 | Bicentennial Park on Spring Street |
| Indiana | South Bend | | hundreds | Jon Hunt Memorial Plaza |
| Indiana | Terre Haute | | 100+ | Demonstrators gathered in the rain in front of the Vigo County Courthouse. |
| Indiana | Valparaiso | | 300+ | Two groups were separated by a street, metal barricades and a line of police officers. As several hundred people on one side, near City Hall, gathered for a March for Our Lives rally, 150 counter-protesters on the other side - calling their rally the March for Our Rights - shouted back. |
| Iowa | Cedar Falls | | 200+ | The march was originally scheduled for March 24, but was postponed due to heavy snowfall. On March 31, demonstrators marched from Gateway Park to US Rep. Rod Blum’s office. |
| Iowa | Cedar Rapids | | | Green Square Park |
| Iowa | Charles City | | nearly 50 | Weekend weather postponed this rally to Sunday, March 25 |
| Iowa | Clinton | | 300 | The march was originally scheduled for March 24, but was postponed due to heavy snowfall. On April 22, demonstrators gathered at the Riverview Bandshell. |
| Iowa | Creston | | | Adams St, outside of Creston Depot |
| Iowa | Davenport | | 800 | Vander Veer Park; people walked through 10 inches of snow |
| Iowa | Decorah | | 200 | Mary Christopher Park - Winneshiek County Courthouse. |
| Iowa | Des Moines | | 3,000–4,000 | Thousands marched to the Iowa State Capitol, in spite of six inches of snow from a fifth March snowstorm blowing through the Midwest. |
| Iowa | Dubuque | | 350 | Washington Square - U.S. Rep. Rod Blum's office in Dubuque |
| Iowa | Iowa City | | 200+ | Hundreds marched (through the snow) from College Green Park to the Pentacrest on the campus of University of Iowa. Twelve-year-old Margalit Frank spoke at a gathering of several hundred protesters saying she didn't want to be murdered. |
| Iowa | Manchester | | | Whitewater Park Gazebo |
| Iowa | Muscatine | | | 401 East 3rd St |
| Iowa | Oelwein | | | Husky Stadium |
| Iowa | Sioux City | | 400+ | Long Lines Family Rec Center - Sioux City Public Museum on Fourth St |
| Iowa | Waterloo | | | |
| Kansas | Lawrence | | 1,700 | South Park - march along Massachusetts Street |
| Kansas | Manhattan | | hundreds | CiCo Park |
| Kansas | Pittsburg | | 40+ | Pittsburg Community Middle School - Pritchett Pavilion. Pittsburg mayor Jeremy Johnson spoke at the rally. |
| Kansas | Salina | | hundreds | Caldwell Plaza |
| Kansas | Topeka | | 500–700 | Kansas Statehouse. Jim McHenry, a Topeka resident and a survivor of the 1966 mass shooting at Texas, spoke to the rally, as did Topeka Mayor Michelle De La Isla. |
| Kansas | Wichita | | 300 | Park Elementary - Old Sedgwick County Courthouse |
| Kentucky | Bowling Green | | ~200 | Henry Hardin Cherry Hall - Fountain Square Park; demonstrators marched in the rain. |
| Kentucky | Calvert City | | hundreds | Memorial Park Amphitheater (Marshall County March For Our Lives) |
| Kentucky | Harrodsburg | | 75 | Mercer County Fiscal Courthouse |
| Kentucky | Lexington | | 1,000+ | Fayette County courthouse square. |
| Kentucky | Louisa | | | Lawrence County High School football field |
| Kentucky | Louisville | | 1,000 | Witherspoon & Brooks Streets - Metro Hall. Several politicians, including Louisville Mayor Greg Fischer and Rep. John Yarmuth, spoke at the rally. |
| Kentucky | Madisonville | | 6 | Old Courthouse Steps |
| Kentucky | Owensboro | | dozens | Smothers Park |
| Kentucky | Pikeville | | dozens | Pikeville City Park; Progress Pike held a candlelight vigil in the snow. |
| Kentucky | Versailles | | | Woodford County High School |
| Louisiana | Baton Rouge | | hundreds | North Boulevard Town Square - Louisiana State Capitol. |
| Louisiana | Church Point | | | Church Point Town Hall - South Rogers Street. |
| Louisiana | Lafayette | | 250+ | Girard Park |
| Louisiana | Lake Charles | | almost 100 | Lock Park |
| Louisiana | Mandeville | | 100+ | Mandeville lakefront |
| Louisiana | Monroe | | dozens | Monroe Civic Center |
| Louisiana | New Orleans | | 6,000 | Washington Park, French Quarter - Duncan Plaza. Several local elected officials, including ste Rep. Gary Carter Jr., came to voice their support. New Orleans Mayor-elect LaToya Cantrell, however, had to cancel her appearance owing to transitional duties. |
| Louisiana | Ruston | | dozens | Ruston Civic Center; rally held by Louisiana Tech students |
| Louisiana | Shreveport | | 100+ | Caddo Parish Courthouse |
| Maine | Bangor | | couple hundred | Abbot Square - public library - Hammond Street Congregational Church |
| Maine | Bar Harbor | | 250 | Village Green |
| Maine | Belfast | | 750–1,000 | downtown post office - Unitarian Universalist Church |
| Maine | Brunswick | | 1,000 | Town Mall gazebo - green Bridge - Brunswick Mall |
| Maine | Damariscotta-Newcastle | | 232–300+ | Damariscotta-Newcastle Bridge; event hosted by Lincoln Academy Gun Control Advocates |
| Maine | Eastport | | 100 | Shead High School - downtown Eastport |
| Maine | Farmington | | 200+ | Mallett School. Maine Attorney General Janet Mills spoke to the crowd. |
| Maine | Gouldsboro | | | Gouldsboro Town Hall, Prospect Harbor |
| Maine | Lewiston | | 100 | Kennedy Park - Dufresne Plaza |
| Maine | Orono | | 100 | Universalist Church - University of Maine campus |
| Maine | Portland | | 4,000–5,000 | Congress Square Park & Portland City Hall; organizers had expected 1,700 to show up |
| Maine | Presque Isle | | 30 | bridge over Aroostook River |
| Maine | Waterville | | 225+ | Castonguay Square. Student organizers Stryker Adams and Marcus Mitchell had started organizing a full-fledged march in Augusta, but couldn't secure a permit in time, so they decided to hold a smaller-scale event in Waterville. |
| Maryland | Annapolis | | 1,500 | Lawyer's Mall; students from Severna Park High School and other Anne Arundel County Public Schools held the demonstration, and invited 188 state legislators, including Annapolis Mayor Gavin Buckley. |
| Maryland | Baltimore | | several thousand | Members of the Student Activist Association at Baltimore Polytechnic Institute organized their march to begin at War Memorial Plaza in front of City Hall and end near the Inner Harbor. U.S. Rep Dutch Ruppersberger spoke at the rally. Baltimore Mayor Catherine Pugh and Oklahoma City Thunder forward (& Baltimore native) Carmelo Anthony helped organize 60 free buses to take 4,500 students to the DC rally. |
| Maryland | Chestertown | | 500 | Kent County government office - Wilmer Park |
| Maryland | Cumberland | | 225 | Allegany County Courthouse |
| Maryland | Leisure World | | 20+ | Georgia Avenue; residents of a senior community planned an event, "Protect Grandchildren, Not Guns" |
| Maryland | Ocean City | | | |
| Maryland | Silver Spring | | 900 | Silver Spring Civic Center. US Rep Jamie Raskin & Maryland Attorney Gen Brian Frosh spoke at the rally. |
| Massachusetts | Amherst | | hundreds | Umass Amherst students met at Haigis Mall on-campus. Hundreds more met at Kendrick Park, then walked to the Town Common in a rally organized by the League of Women Voters of Amherst. |
| Massachusetts | Ashby | | 75 | Ashby Common; rally sponsored by Social Justice Working Group at First Parish Unitarian Universalist Church |
| Massachusetts | Beverly | | 500 | Lynch Park |
| Massachusetts | Boston | | 50,000–100,000 | 5,000 people marched from Madison Park High School, Roxbury, to a rally in Boston Common, where between 70,000 (police estimate) and 100,000 people (organizer estimate) had gathered. The march route and rally location echoed the massive August, 2017 counter-protest (30,000–40,000) of the Boston Free Speech Rally. The student-led march placed a focus on gun violence in the Boston community, where low-income and minority youth are threatened at far greater rates than their affluent, suburban-dwelling counterparts. Boston students, teachers, and Stoneman Douglas alumni (including Parkman survivor Leonor Muñoz) spoke at the rally following the march. A small pro-gun counter-protest (100 people) was held outside the State Capitol Building. |
| Massachusetts | Chelmsford | | 600 | Chelmsford Common. Congressional candidate Rufus Gifford was present. |
| Massachusetts | Falmouth | | 500 | Falmouth Village Green. State Rep Dylan Fernandes & US Rep Bill Keating were present. |
| Massachusetts | Greenfield | | dozens | Greenfield Common |
| Massachusetts | Haverhill | | hundreds | Main St, across from Harbor Place Hotel. Haverhill Mayor James Fiorentini and Rep. Diana DiZoglio joined the marchers. |
| Massachusetts | Hyannis | | 1,500 | Hyannis Village Green / Barnstable Town Hall. US Rep Bill Keating spoke at the rally. |
| Massachusetts | Ipswich | | 200+ | Ipswich Middle Green between Visitor Center & Veterans Memorial |
| Massachusetts | Martha's Vineyard | | 150+ | Five Corners |
| Massachusetts | Nantucket | | 200 | Nantucket High School Students hosted a rally at the Nantucket Atheneum and a march around town. |
| Massachusetts | Northampton | | 2,000–3,000 | Northampton High School - City Hall |
| Massachusetts | Petersham | | | event planned at Petersham South Common |
| Massachusetts | Pittsfield | | 500+ | Park Square - Pittsfield High School |
| Massachusetts | Plymouth | | 400+ | 1820 Courthouse lawn / Town Hall Green |
| Massachusetts | Springfield | | 1,000+ | A few hundred people called on the CEO of Smith & Wesson (headquartered in Springfield) to cease contributing to the NRA and to stop selling assault rifles to the general public. |
| Massachusetts | Worcester | | several thousand | Rally at Worcester City Hall, march up Main Street, across Lincoln Square and around the Voke Apartments. US Sen. Elizabeth Warren, the only adult speaker at the event, spoke early in the morning, before heading to Boston, then to Springfield. |
| Michigan | Adrian | | 300 | Lenawee County Courthouse. |
| Michigan | Albion | | 50+ | Albion College - Holland Park. |
| Michigan | Alpena | | 200 | Thunder Bay National Marine Sanctuary - Culligan Plaza. |
| Michigan | Ann Arbor | | 4,000–8,000 | Pioneer High School. |
| Michigan | Battle Creek | | 200 | Sojourner Truth Monument. |
| Michigan | Big Rapids | | ~60 | Big Rapids Community Library - Ferris State University campus. |
| Michigan | Detroit | | 10,000+ (18,000 expected) | Brooke Solomon, 15, led thousands of demonstrators in a march through the downtown streets of Detroit, from Rivard Plaza to Detroit Riverfront to the Renaissance Center. US Sen. Debbie Stabenow was in attendance at the rally, sitting side stage. It was later reported that on the same day of the March, 5 people were shot in the city (one of them died). |
| Michigan | Douglas | | 150–200 | event planned at Beery Field, South Main Street |
| Michigan | Flint | | 300 | Willson Park / University of Michigan Flint. Flint Mayor Karen Weaver and US Rep Dan Kildee were present. |
| Michigan | Grand Haven | | several hundred | Grand Haven Central Park. |
| Michigan | Grand Rapids | | 4,000 | Rosa Parks Circle |
| Michigan | Grosse Pointe Farms | | 150+ | A large group of people met at Messner Field outside Richard Elementary School, then marched down Kercheval Avenue. |
| Michigan | Holland | | 100+ | Centennial Park |
| Michigan | Houghton | | 100+ | Houghton Lift Bridge |
| Michigan | Iron Mountain | | 100–125 | gathering behind city hall. |
| Michigan | Kalamazoo | | 1,000+ | Western Michigan University - Bronson Park |
| Michigan | Keego Harbor | | 800–1,000 | Keego Harbor City Hall |
| Michigan | Lansing | | 3,000 | In Lansing, a crowd of thousands marched from the Hall of Justice to the Capitol Building. Hours later, a rally organized by III% United Patriots of Michigan was held on the same Capitol steps in support of the Second Amendment. |
| Michigan | Manistee | | 225 | Manistee County Transportation Center |
| Michigan | Marquette | | 300–400 | Marquette Commons |
| Michigan | Monroe | | nearly 200 | St. Mary's Park |
| Michigan | Mount Pleasant | | hundreds | Island Park |
| Michigan | Munising | | | event planned at 100 W. Munising Ave |
| Michigan | Muskegon | | 60 | 550 W Western Ave, downtown Muskegon |
| Michigan | Petoskey | | 150 | Big Hole, 207 E Mitchell St - Petoskey District Library |
| Michigan | Port Huron | | 200 | Municipal Office Center |
| Michigan | Rochester | | 800 | Oakland University, 318 Meadow Brook Road |
| Michigan | Saginaw | | 200+ | Krossroads Park, 5656 Bay Road |
| Michigan | St. Joseph | | 200+ | Lake Bluff Park |
| Michigan | Traverse City | | 3,500 | The Workshop Brewing Company |
| Minnesota | Aitkin | | 6 | Aitkin County Courthouse |
| Minnesota | Brainerd | | 300 | About 300 people took part in the march, gathering first at Gregory Park and walking along Washington St. Along the way, organizers said marchers were met by some snowballs and raw eggs. |
| Minnesota | Duluth | | 1,500 | Historic Old Central High School - Civic Center; vigil at City Hall. Duluth Mayor Emily Larson was present. |
| Minnesota | Ely | | 70 | Whiteside Park |
| Minnesota | Grand Marais | | ~130 | Harbor Park |
| Minnesota | Grand Rapids | | 200 | Old Central High School - City Hall |
| Minnesota | Mankato | | 200 | Riverfront Park - Jackson Park |
| Minnesota | Minneapolis | | hundreds | (Feb 22) Hundreds of Minneapolis high school students staged a walkout and marched on City Hall, where they were greeted by Mayor Jacob Frey. |
| Minnesota | North Branch | | 100+ | Sunrise Prairie Trail / North Branch Public Library |
| Minnesota | Rochester | | 500 | Peace Plaza - Mayo Park |
| Minnesota | St. Paul | | 18,000–20,000 | Students and supporters gathered at Harriet Island in St. Paul before marching to the State Capitol. Minneapolis Mayor Jacob Frey was among the participants. |
| Minnesota | Sartell | | 300+ | Sartell City Hall -Pinecoad Rd - First United Methodist Church |
| Minnesota | Starbuck | | | VFW Post 4582 Parking Lot, 212 E 6th St; event sponsored by West Central Minnesota Indivisible |
| Minnesota | Willmar | | 200 | First Street |
| Minnesota | Winona | | 250 | Winona Senior High School, Sarnia Street - bandshell, Lake Park |
| Mississippi | Amory | | 30+ | protesters made their way toward Amory Main St to hold a rally in Frisco Park |
| Mississippi | Clarksdale | | 20+ | rally outside Oakhurst Intermediate School |
| Mississippi | Durant | | 18 | The Mayor's Youth Council led a group parade and received pledges of support from the mayor and police chief. |
| Mississippi | Gulfport | | 300+ | Dan M. Russell Federal Courthouse |
| Mississippi | Hernando | | 200 | DeSoto County Courthouse lawn |
| Mississippi | Jackson | | 200 | Mississippi State Supreme Court - Governor's Mansion |
| Mississippi | McComb | | couple dozen | convenience store green space across from Walmart |
| Mississippi | Oxford | | 350+ | City Hall |
| Mississippi | Tupelo | | 50+ | Fairpark - Gateway Park |
| Missouri | Columbia | | 1,000 | University of Missouri Press - Boone County Courthouse |
| Missouri | Joplin | | 200–250 | Seventh & Main Sts - Spiva Park |
| Missouri | Kansas City | | 5,000–6,000 | Theis Park - Country Club Plaza. Kansas City Mayor Sly James was present. |
| Missouri | Lee's Summit | | several hundred | Lee's Summit City Hall; rally organizers estimated as many as 1,000 participants. |
| Missouri | St. Joseph | | 300 | North Belt Highway |
| Missouri | St. Louis | | 10,000–20,000 | Demonstrators gathered in Veterans Park and marched from Union Station to the Gateway Arch. US Sen. Claire McCaskill was present. |
| Missouri | Springfield | | 2,000+ | Park Central Square. Former Missouri Gov. Bob Holden was present. |
| Missouri | Warrensburg | | 60 | Johnson County Courthouse |
| Montana | Billings | | 500 | Students met at the Yellowstone County Courthouse, and marched to the James F. Battin Federal Courthouse. At the rally, statements were read from Montana Gov. Steve Bullock and U.S. Sen. Jon Tester. |
| Montana | Bozeman | | 2,000+ | Hundreds of protesters (organizers estimated roughly 2,000) gathered at Gallatin County Courthouse, then marched along Main St to the lawn outside Bozeman Public Library. A small group of local pro-gun counter-protesters was also present. |
| Montana | Great Falls | | 50–100 | Gibson Park |
| Montana | Helena | | 1,000+ | More than 1,000 people gathered at Memorial Park for The March For Our Lives. Meanwhile, a group of 2nd Amendment enthusiasts called "March For Our Guns" staged its own counter-protest. |
| Montana | Missoula | | several thousand | Caras Park; For the third time since the Parkland shooting on Valentine's Day, Missoulians hit the streets to march against gun violence in schools. |
| Nebraska | Hastings | | 200+ | Marchers walked across town, down 14th Street, where they then held a candlelight vigil. |
| Nebraska | Kearney | | ~100 | Marchers marched along 25th Street: From the University of Nebraska-Kearney campus, to downtown Kearney. |
| Nebraska | Lincoln | | 1,000–1,400+ | Marchers marched from the Nebraska Union (on the University of Nebraska-Lincoln city campus), to the front steps of the Nebraska State Capitol in downtown Lincoln, where a rally was held. |
| Nebraska | Omaha | | 2,500 | People gathered at the Lewis & Clark Landing for a rally, and then led a march across the Bob Kerrey Pedestrian Bridge. |
| Nevada | Carson City | | 300+ | Mills Park - Nevada State Capitol building; organizer George McKinnon officially announced his switch from the Republican party to the Democratic Party. Congressional candidate Rick Sheppard and Senate candidate Curtis Cannon were in attendance. |
| Nevada | Las Vegas | | thousands | Smith Center - Las Vegas City Hall |
| Nevada | Mesquite | | 40 | The 40 people who showed up for the Mesquite March for Our Lives outside City Hall were not students, but part of the Virgin Valley Action Group, a citizen advocacy group aimed at protecting the rights of those threatened by unjust policies of any kind. |
| Nevada | Reno | | 3,000+ | Bruce R. Thompson Federal Building - Reno City Plaza. |
| New Hampshire | Concord | | 4,000 | New Hampshire State House. (At least one counter-protester stood out) |
| New Hampshire | Jackson | | 300+ | Jackson Covered Bridge - Jackson Grammar School |
| New Hampshire | Keene | | dozens | Central Square |
| New Hampshire | Lancaster | | 200+ | Main Street |
| New Hampshire | Nashua | | 500 | Students of Nashua High School & Elm Street Middle School marched to City Hall. Nashua Mayor Jim Donchess & US Senators Maggie Hassan & Jeanne Shaheen attended the rally. |
| New Hampshire | Portsmouth | | 2,500 | Pleasant St, Market Square |
| New Jersey | Asbury Park | | thousands | people attended the rally on the boardwalk down to Bradley Park by Convention Hall |
| New Jersey | Audubon - Haddon Heights | | 1,000 | Haddon Lake Park recreation center in Audubon - McLaughlin-Norcross Memorial Dell in Haddon Heights. |
| New Jersey | Englewood | | nearly 1,000 | Monument Circle on Palisade Ave - Municipal Court House, South Van Brunt St |
| New Jersey | Freehold | | 650 | rally organized outside US Rep Chris Smith's office. |
| New Jersey | Great Falls | | 100 | |
| New Jersey | Hackensack | | hundreds | 10 Main Street; New Jersey's First Lady Tammy Murphy attended the Hackensack march. |
| New Jersey | Hoboken | | 1,000+ | Jubilee Center - City Hall |
| New Jersey | Jersey City | | 500+ | James J. Ferris High School - City Hall |
| New Jersey | Madison | | 100–150 | Hartley Dodge Memorial Municipal Building, 50 Kings Rd; Madison, NJ Mayor Bob Conley spoke at the rally. |
| New Jersey | Maplewood | | hundreds | Student activists from Columbia High School (CHS) and Maplewood Middle School (MMS) led an early morning rally at Maplewood train station. After the rally, participants boarded trains for the March in Newark and to Penn Station for the NYC March. Maplewood Mayor Vic DeLuca was one of several elected NJ officials who attended the rally and train ride for support. |
| New Jersey | Metuchen | | | Borough Hall. |
| New Jersey | Montclair | | hundreds | St. James Episcopal Church |
| New Jersey | Morristown | | 13,000 | Morristown Mayor Timothy Dougherty addressed the crowd at Morristown Town Hall, before everyone marched down South Street. U.S. Rep. Steny Hoyer (D-MD-5) - where a recent shooting at Great Mills High School claimed the life of a female student - attended Morristown's rally but didn't address the crowd. |
| New Jersey | Newark | | 5,000+ | Newark was New Jersey's official site at Military Park with Gov. Phil Murphy as a speaker. Murphy was introduced by event co-organizer Zachary Dougherty, a student activist with March for Our Lives New Jersey. |
| New Jersey | Newton | | 500+ | Newton Green |
| New Jersey | Ocean City | | ~1,000 | Boardwalk march from 5th Street to Ocean City High School |
| New Jersey | Paramus | | 30 | Residents of the Brightview Senior Living home marched in front of their building. |
| New Jersey | Paterson | | 100+ | Cobb Park; "Prayer March for Peace". |
| New Jersey | Piscataway | | 100 | An event called "Breakfast Against Bullets" was held at Piscataway High School. The event included voting registrations, petition signings for gun control regulations, and speeches by teachers and students. |
| New Jersey | Princeton | | 3,000–4,000 | Hinds Plaza |
| New Jersey | Red Bank | | 2,000+ | Red Bank train station - Riverside Gardens Park. US Rep. Frank Pallone attended this rally, plus two others in Asbury Park and Metuchen. |
| New Jersey | Somerville | | 1,000 | Somerset County Courthouse. |
| New Jersey | Union | | 500+ | Burnet Middle School - Morris Ave |
| New Jersey | West Milford | | 75 | march along Marshall Hill Road |
| New Jersey | Westfield | | 4,000 | South side of the Westfield train station - Mindowaskin Park |
| New Jersey | Woodland Park | | | event planned at Rifle Camp Park |
| New Mexico | Albuquerque | | 8,000+ | The rally started in the morning with hundreds of people gathered in Old Town Plaza, and quickly grew to thousands at the march's end at Tiguex Park. Albuquerque Mayor Tim Keller was present. |
| New Mexico | Clovis | | 60 | Hilltop Plaza - Curry County Courthouse |
| New Mexico | Las Cruces | | 150 | Telshor Blvd / Lohman Ave intersection |
| New Mexico | Rio Rancho | | 500 | Haynes Park |
| New Mexico | Roswell | | 60 | Pioneer Plaza - Chaves County Courthouse |
| New Mexico | Santa Fe | | ~4,000 | Santa Fe Plaza. Newly elected Mayor Alan Webber, one of the few adult speakers at the rally, commended the students' efforts and said city officials are listening to their demands. |
| New Mexico | Silver City | | 400 | Gough Park |
| New York | Albany | | 5,000+ | West Capitol Park |
| New York | Ardsley | | hundreds | Pascone Park - American Legion - McDowell Field. State Sen. Andrea Stewart-Cousins & Ardsley Mayor Nancy Kaboolian attended the rally |
| New York | Batavia | | 200+ | Williams Park; most of the people who turned up were adults, age 50 and older |
| New York | Binghamton | | hundreds | Southern Tier - American Civil Association (ACA) memorial park / Binghamton High School |
| New York | Buffalo | | 3,000 | Niagara Square |
| New York | Cambridge | | dozen+ | Cambridge United Presbyterian Church - Union Street intersection - Round House Bakery Cafe at Hubbard Hall |
| New York | Cedarhurst | | | |
| New York | Cobleskill | | 300+ | Veteran's Memorial Centre Park |
| New York | Corning | | hundreds | Market St |
| New York | Dunkirk | | 300 | Washington Park |
| New York | Farmingdale | | 1,500 | SUNY Farmingdale |
| New York | Geneva | | 100+ | Bicentennial Park |
| New York | Glen Cove | | 800–1,300 | Finley Middle School - downtown Glen Cove |
| New York | Great Neck | | hundreds | Jonathan L. Ielpi Firefighters Memorial Park |
| New York | Hopewell | | 100+ | Finger Lakes Community College |
| New York | Huntington | | 1,000 | Huntington Town Hall |
| New York | Ithaca | | 1,000 | Bernie Milton Pavilion |
| New York | Long Beach | | 500 | Kennedy Plaza / City Hall |
| New York | Malone | | 50 | |
| New York | Massena | | 5 | a small crowd stood outside Massena Town Hall |
| New York | Middletown | | hundreds | SUNY Orange - skate park |
| New York | New City | | 1,000+ | Rockland County Courthouse |
| New York | New York City (Manhattan) | | 200,000–500,000 | New York City's rally was reported to have 200,000 attendees during the rally, although some estimates have the number as high as 500,000. Paul McCartney attended the NYC March for Our Lives in remembrance of his late friend, fellow Beatle John Lennon. Actress Cynthia Nixon also participated. |
| New York | New York City (Coney Island) | | 100+ | Coney Island Boardwalk |
| New York | Old Westbury | | hundreds | SUNY College at Old Westbury |
| New York | Oneonta | | 400+ | Muller Plaza |
| New York | Ossining | | 1,000 | Louis Engel Waterfront Park, by the Ossining Metro-North Station |
| New York | Patchogue | | | outside Rep. Lee Zeldin’s district office |
| New York | Plattsburgh | | 200+ | SUNY Plattsburgh - Trinity Park |
| New York | Port Jefferson Station | | several hundred | Resistance Corner (intersection of Rtes 347 & 112) |
| New York | Port Washington | | nearly 1,000 | On Saturday evening, nearly 1,000 people gathered on the lawn of the United Methodist Church for a candlelight vigil. |
| New York | Potsdam | | 300 | Potsdam High School - Leroy, Elm and Cottage Streets (Potsdam Town Hall along the way) |
| New York | Poughkeepsie | | 7,000+ | Thousands gathered at the Walkway Over the Hudson [State Park] |
| New York | Rochester | | 5,000 | Washington Square Park. Rochester Mayor Lovely Warren was present. |
| New York | Rockland | | 4,000 | Rockland County, where a crowd of 400 was anticipated, had 4,000 in attendance, according to WABC. |
| New York | Rome | | 160 | Rome City Hall |
| New York | Rye Neck | | 1,500+ | Rye Neck High School - Florence Park |
| New York | Sag Harbor | | 1,000+ | Long Wharf |
| New York | Saranac Lake | | 200+ | Riverside Park |
| New York | Seneca Falls | | 300 | People's Park |
| New York | Stony Brook | | 300 | Stony Brook University |
| New York | Syracuse | | 1,000+ | James M. Hanley Federal Building Plaza / Everson Museum of Art. Syracuse Mayor Ben Walsh was present. |
| New York | Utica | | 100+ | Proctor High School - Oneida Square |
| New York | White Plains | | 3,000+ | Post Road Elementary - Westchester County Courthouse (near Martin Luther King Jr. statue) |
| North Carolina | Asheville | | 6,000 | Vance Monument - Martin Luther King Jr Park |
| North Carolina | Boone | | 50+ | Watauga County Library - App State University (ASU) campus |
| North Carolina | Charlotte | | 2,500+ | First Ward Park - Marshall Park |
| North Carolina | Durham | | 2,000 | CCB Plaza |
| North Carolina | Elizabeth City | | nearly 100 | Mariners’ Wharf Park |
| North Carolina | Fayetteville | | 100+ | College Lakes Recreation Center |
| North Carolina | Franklin | | 200+ | Big Bear Shelter |
| North Carolina | Greensboro | | 3,000–3,200 | Governmental Center |
| North Carolina | Greenville | | hundreds | Pitt County Courthouse |
| North Carolina | Hendersonville | | several hundred | Hendersonville High School auditorium - Historic Courthouse - Sanctuary Brewing Company |
| North Carolina | Hickory | | 300+ | YMCA Teen Center - Union Square, Downtown Hickory |
| North Carolina | Laurinburg | | dozens | St. Andrews University's bell tower |
| North Carolina | Lenoir | | 100 | Caldwell County March for Our Lives: Main and West Avenue |
| North Carolina | Mooresville | | 100 | Mooresville High School - Town Hall |
| North Carolina | Nags Head | | several hundred | Outer Banks March For Our Lives Rally for Safe Schools, Dowdy Park |
| North Carolina | Raleigh | | 10,000 | City Plaza, 400 Fayetteville St - Halifax Mall, behind the state Legislative Building. Aaron Wolff, a survivor of the 2007 Virginia Tech massacre, spoke to the crowd, as did state Senator Jay Chaudhuri. |
| North Carolina | Sparta | | 27 | Miles Realty; downtown |
| North Carolina | Warrenton | | 100 | 109 Cousin Lucy Lane - Warren County Courthouse Square |
| North Carolina | Wilmington | | 3,000+ | Riverfront Park - Lennon Federal Courthouse; turnout was twice what organizers hoped for |
| North Carolina | Winston-Salem | | 1,500 | Corpening Plaza |
| North Dakota | Bismarck | | ~100 | Around 100 people gathered just steps from the North Dakota state capitol to support the movement. A march around the capitol grounds was canceled because of the snow & ice |
| North Dakota | Fargo | | hundreds | In an event organized by Moms Demand Action with a rally at Sanctuary Event Center, there were more protesters than any other recent event held in Fargo. Speakers included students, teachers, and state legislators. "Nobody asked to eliminate the Second Amendment, but they all wanted change including, mandatory background checks before buying guns, raised minimum ages for gun purchases, and more behavioral health services." There was one vocal counter-protester. |
| North Dakota | Minot | | few dozen | Federal Court House - Scandinavian Heritage Park |
| Ohio | Akron | | 1,500–2,000 | Highland Square Library. Akron Mayor Dan Horrigan was present. |
| Ohio | Ashland | | 200+ | Christ United Methodist Church - Corner Park downtown |
| Ohio | Athens | | hundreds | Ohio University College Green - University Terrace & Park Place; organized by OU College Democrats |
| Ohio | Avon Lake | | 250 | Avon Lake High School |
| Ohio | Bowling Green | | 200+ | Bowling Green State University (BGSU): the Oval outside Bowen-Thompson Student Union |
| Ohio | Canton | | 400+ | Market Plaza |
| Ohio | Celina | | 64 | Mercer County Courthouse; Republican congressional candidate Bob Kreienkamp spoke at the rally. |
| Ohio | Cincinnati | | 10,000 | Despite snowy weather, thousands marched from City Hall to Fountain Square. Cincinnati Mayor John Cranley was present. |
| Ohio | Cleveland | | 20,000 | Cleveland Mayor Frank Jackson & former US Rep & Democratic candidate for governor Dennis Kucinich addressed the crowd at Public Square. |
| Ohio | Columbus | | 5,000+ | Thousands of students, teenagers, children, parents & teachers marched from the West Bank Park in downtown Columbus to the Ohio Statehouse. US Sen. Sherrod Brown & his wife, Pulitzer Prize-winning journalist Connie Schultz were present. |
| Ohio | Dayton | | several hundred | Courthouse Square |
| Ohio | Marietta | | 250 | Muskingum Park |
| Ohio | Medina | | dozens | Medina's historic square |
| Ohio | Mount Vernon | | 40+ | Public Square |
| Ohio | Newark | | 250–300 | Licking County Courthouse |
| Ohio | Norwalk | | 100 | Norwalk High School - US Rep Jim Jordan's office |
| Ohio | Sandusky | | 150–200 | Schade-Mylander Plaza |
| Ohio | Steubenville | | 15 | Jefferson County Courthouse - Third Street - Steubenville High School |
| Ohio | Toledo | | thousands | Promenade Park - One Government Center. Toledo Mayor Wade Kapszukiewicz attended the march. |
| Ohio | Van Wert | | 40+ | YWCA - Fountain Park |
| Ohio | Youngstown | | 600+ | Wick Park |
| Oklahoma | Oklahoma City | | hundreds | March for Our Lives OKC kicked off at noon at the Oklahoma County Election Board, then moved on Lincoln Blvd toward the State Capitol. A group of counter-protesters stood on the side; they would later take part in a Second Amendment rally at the Capitol Building on Monday, March 26. |
| Oklahoma | Stillwater | | | event planned at Library Lawn |
| Oklahoma | Tulsa | | 2,500 | Guthrie Green - Tulsa City Hall |
| Oregon | Ashland | | | event planned at Ashland Plaza |
| Oregon | Astoria | | hundreds | intersection of Commercial St & 8th St |
| Oregon | Bandon | | 60+ | Bandon City Hall |
| Oregon | Bend | | 4,000 | Drake Park Amphitheater - march thru downtown; thousands gathered in student-led protests, including Bend Mayor Casey Roats, City Councilor Nathan Boddie and Deschutes County District Attorney John Hummel. |
| Oregon | Brookings | | 100 | Curry County Democratic HQ on Chetco Ave |
| Oregon | Burns | | | event planned at Safeway |
| Oregon | Coos Bay | | 200 | Coos Bay Boardwalk - City Hall. Cameron Langley and Gracie Schlager from Marshfield High School assisted by Ronni Jennings organized the march. |
| Oregon | Corvallis | | 3,000–4,000 | In Corvallis, with a total population of about 57,000, crowds estimated at 2,700 by the Gazette-Times and from 3,000 to 4,000 by event organizers, gathered at the Riverfront Commemorative Park for a rally then marched downtown. |
| Oregon | Eugene | | 5,000+ | The event at Wayne Lyman Morse U.S. Courthouse was peaceful, and no citations or arrests were reported, police said. A male heckler was shouted down by other attendees during one of the speeches. |
| Oregon | Florence | | 100 | About 100 people endured pouring rain and cold as they walked along Highway 101 in Florence to add their voices to the national calls for reform. |
| Oregon | La Grande | | | Union County offices - Max Square, via Fourth Street |
| Oregon | McMinnville | | several hundred | 15th Street and Evans next to Mac High - 3rd Street & Evans |
| Oregon | Medford | | 1,500–2,000 | Jackson County Courthouse - Central High School's Spielberg Stadium |
| Oregon | Newport | | 100+ | Newport City Hall - bridge at Hwy 101 |
| Oregon | Pendleton | | 160 | Brownfield Park - Umatilla County Courthouse |
| Oregon | Portland | | 12,000 | 12,000 marched from the North Park Blocks to Pioneer Courthouse Square in downtown Portland, more info on March for Our Lives Portland. |
| Oregon | Roseburg | | 150 | event held at Fred Meyer on Garden Valley Boulevard |
| Oregon | Salem | | 2,400 | rally & march at Oregon State Capitol |
| Oregon | St. Helens | | | event planned at sidewalk in front of McBride School |
| Oregon | Tillamook | | 150 | Goodspeed Park - Tillamook High School |
| Pennsylvania | Allentown | | hundreds | 7th & Hamilton. US Sen. Bob Casey attended. |
| Pennsylvania | Beaver | | 300+ | Beaver County Courthouse; 100 pro-gun people showed up a block away from the courthouse |
| Pennsylvania | Bloomsburg | | 100 | fountain in Bloomsburg Main & Market St |
| Pennsylvania | Doylestown | | 3,000 | According to police and the event organizers around 3,000 gathered at Bucks County Courthouse. |
| Pennsylvania | Easton | | 100+ | Lafayette College campus - Centre Square |
| Pennsylvania | Erie | | 400 | Perry Square |
| Pennsylvania | Gettysburg | | 200+ | Lincoln Square |
| Pennsylvania | Greensburg | | 200 | The rally was held on Friday, March 23, at the local courthouse. Across the street, an off-duty police officer stood on the sidewalk holding an AR-15 rifle, the photo of which went viral and inundated the Rostraver Police Department with phone calls from across the country. |
| Pennsylvania | Harrisburg | | thousands | Pennsylvania State Capitol |
| Pennsylvania | Hazleton | | 300+ | Memorial Park |
| Pennsylvania | Lancaster | | 3,000 | Several thousand protesters marched from Clipper Magazine Stadium to the city's Binns Park. Speakers included Angel Colon, an activist who was wounded in the 2016 Orlando nightclub shooting; Janice Ballenger, an author and one of the first responders at the 2006 West Nickel Mines School shooting; community activist, Kevin Ressler; and Lancaster Mayor Danene Sorace. |
| Pennsylvania | Lewisburg | | 200 | Market Street |
| Pennsylvania | Meadville | | 150+ | Diamond Park |
| Pennsylvania | Media | | hundreds | Rose Tree Park |
| Pennsylvania | Mercer | | 70 | Mercer County Courthouse |
| Pennsylvania | Norristown | | 40+ | Norristown Farm Park |
| Pennsylvania | Philadelphia | | 15,000 | Independence Hall, 5th & Market Streets - Columbus Circle. The marchers were joined by Philadelphia Mayor Jim Kenney, US Sen. Bob Casey (who also went to the Allentown rally), State Rep. Brian Sims & state Attorney General Josh Shapiro, among other community leaders |
| Pennsylvania | Pittsburgh | | 30,000+ | City-County Building Portico - Market Square; city officials originally expected 3,000 people. US Rep. Mike Doyle & Pittsburgh Mayor Bill Peduto spoke at the rally. |
| Pennsylvania | Pottstown | | ~125 | Riverfront Park-Rotary Pavilion |
| Pennsylvania | Reading | | 1,500 | Protesters marched from Reading City Park to Reading Senior High School where a rally was held. |
| Pennsylvania | Scranton | | 1,000+ | Scranton High School - Courthouse Square |
| Pennsylvania | State College | | hundreds | courtyard, State College Area High School - Penn State's Old Main Building |
| Pennsylvania | Stroudsburg | | 100+ | Courthouse Square |
| Pennsylvania | West Chester | | 500–1,500 | Historic Chester County Courthouse, High St. Jay Leno made an appearance with Mayor Dianne Herrin (in a selfie). |
| Pennsylvania | Williamsport | | 175 | Market Square - West Fourth St - Federal Building |
| Pennsylvania | York | | 900 | Downtown York, 28 E. Market St |
| Puerto Rico | San Juan | | 600+ | Condado Lagoon - Peace Pavilion, Luis Muñoz Rivera Park. Governor Ricardo Rosselló, who was away from the island at the time, congratulated the citizens of San Juan who marched in solidarity with families affected by gun violence. He also thanked the Secretary of State, Luis Rivera Marin, for organizing the event, and boxing champion Félix "Tito" Trinidad who, along with other amateur boxers, participated and showed their support to the cause. |
| Rhode Island | Providence | | 3,000–5,000 | Thousands showed up at the Rhode Island State House. Among the speakers were Gov. Gina Raimondo & US Sen. Sheldon Whitehouse. |
| South Carolina | Aiken | | 100 | Aiken County Judicial Center - Newberry Street |
| South Carolina | Anderson | | 74 | rally planned at Courthouse Square, 100 S Main St (no march included) |
| South Carolina | Beaufort | | 350+ | near Beaufort High School to pavilion at Henry C. Chambers Waterfront Park |
| South Carolina | Bluffton | | 400–500 | H.E. McCracken Middle School - Buckwalter Parkway |
| South Carolina | Columbia | | 2,000 | S.C. State House |
| South Carolina | Greenville | | 2,000 | NOMA Square - City Hall on Main St |
| South Carolina | Myrtle Beach | | hundreds | Market Common |
| South Carolina | North Charleston | | 1,200–1,500 | Riverfront Park |
| South Carolina | Rock Hill | | 50+ | Winthrop University - Senator Lindsey Graham’s office in downtown Rock Hill |
| South Dakota | Rapid City | | nearly 500 | between both marchers and counter-protesters, about 500 in attendance |
| South Dakota | Sioux Falls | | 300+ | Carnegie Town Hall - Falls Park |
| South Dakota | Vermillion | | hundreds | First United Methodist Church - Clay County Courthouse |
| Tennessee | Chattanooga | | 1,000+ | Coolidge Park - courthouse |
| Tennessee | Clarksville | | 200–300 | Pavilion at McGregor Park Riverwalk. Clarksville Mayor Kim McMillan attended the event. |
| Tennessee | Cookeville | | 400+ | Courthouse on the Square |
| Tennessee | Jackson | | 75 | march to City Hall in Downtown Jackson |
| Tennessee | Johnson City | | 200+ | South Side Elementary - Culp Center Cave |
| Tennessee | Knoxville | | 1,000 | UT's Humanities Amphitheater - Circle Park |
| Tennessee | Memphis | | 1,500 | In Memphis, thousands of people marched from Clayborn Temple to the front of the National Civil Rights Museum where organizers were encouraging all of the young people in attendance to register to vote. |
| Tennessee | Nashville | | 10,000–12,000 | At Public Square Park, Nashville Mayor David Briley urged everyone 18 and up to go out and vote. |
| Texas | Abilene | | 200+ | Abilene City Hall |
| Texas | Amarillo | | 500–630 | Ellwood Park - Potter County Courthouse |
| Texas | Austin | | 20,000 | Austin Mayor Steve Adler, state Reps. Gina Hinojosa and Eddie Rodriguez and actor Matthew McConaughey addressed the crowd at Austin City Hall. |
| Texas | Beaumont | | 262 | Beaumont City Hall / Lamar University |
| Texas | Brownsville | | 62 | On Friday, April 6, 62 Guadeloupe Regional Middle School students, with police escort, held a silent march in downtown Brownsville - through Linear Park, to the Cameron County Courthouse and Immaculate Conception Cathedral before making their way back to school - in remembrance of the victims of school shootings. |
| Texas | College Station | | 1,500+ | Rudder Plaza on the Texas A&M campus |
| Texas | Corpus Christi | | 300 | Sherill Veterans Memorial Park; students from W.B. Ray High School led a march. |
| Texas | Dallas | | 4,000–5,000 | Dallas City Hall |
| Texas | Denton | | several hundred | Denton Courthouse |
| Texas | El Paso | | several hundred | Cleveland Square to San Jacinto Plaza. Present at the rally were State Sen José R. Rodríguez & US Rep Beto O'Rourke (challenger to US Sen. Ted Cruz). |
| Texas | Fort Worth | | 6,000–7,000 | Tarrant County Courthouse |
| Texas | Galveston | | 200+ | Fort Crockett Park, beach side of Seawell Blvd |
| Texas | Houston | | 15,000 | Houston Mayor Sylvester Turner & US Rep Sheila Jackson Lee spoke to the crowd at Tranquility Park; the protest extended to Sen. Ted Cruz's office. |
| Texas | Killeen | | 200 | Killeen Community Center |
| Texas | Laredo | | 75 | Laredo Independent School District's Performing Arts Center - Cultura Beer Gardens |
| Texas | Marfa | | 150+ | Presidio County Courthouse - town's school campus |
| Texas | McAllen | | 300+ | McAllen City Hall |
| Texas | McKinney | | few hundred | Collin County Courthouse |
| Texas | New Braunfels | | dozen | event held at Main Downtown Plaza |
| Texas | Pflugerville | | 200+ | Pfield district stadium. Pflugerville Mayor Victor Gonzales was present. |
| Texas | Round Rock | | 300 | event planned in Round Rock, TX |
| Texas | San Antonio | | 5,500 | City Hall - The Alamo Plaza |
| Texas | Waco | | nearly 400 | Heritage Square. Michelle Porter, who survived the Columbine High School massacre, was scheduled to speak. |
| Utah | Cedar City | | 150 | event held at Southern Utah University campus, by the clock tower. |
| Utah | Logan | | 200+ | Cache County Courthouse |
| Utah | Park City | | hundreds | McKenna Pfahl was one of three Parkland survivors who, on their spring break, participated and spoke at the Park City March for our Lives in Utah. |
| Utah | St. George | | 800–1,000 | Dixie State University campus - City Hall. St. George Mayor Jon Pike was present. |
| Utah | Salt Lake City | | 6,000 | Six thousand people (mainly students) marched for more gun regulations. An hour before their march, five hundred pro-gun marchers also called for safer schools. Two weeks later, on April 14, hundreds of gun rights people rallied at the Utah State Capitol, as well as in other cities like Orem and Cedar City. |
| United States Virgin Islands | Saint Croix | | 26 | Marchers gathered at the National Park Service bandstand in Christiansted. |
| Vermont | Bennington | | 100+ | Four Corners |
| Vermont | Manchester | | 100 | |
| Vermont | Middlebury | | 500+ | Middlebury town green |
| Vermont | Montpelier | | 2,500–3,500 | Thousands came to rally at the Vermont State House. Notable leaders who attended (but did not speak) included US Sen. Bernie Sanders, US Rep. Peter Welch and Burlington Mayor Miro Weinberger. |
| Vermont | Putney | | 400 | Putney Tavern Lawn |
| Vermont | Rutland | | hundreds | Main St |
| Virginia | Abingdon | | dozens | Washington County Courthouse |
| Virginia | Alexandria | | 225–250 | Lyles-Crouch Traditional Academy - Alexandria Courthouse |
| Virginia | Blacksburg | | 200+ | Henderson Lawn on the Campus of Virginia Tech |
| Virginia | Charlottesville | | 3,500+ | An early estimate from Indivisible Charlottesville expected nearly 2,000 to participate. On Saturday, the Sprint Pavilion at Downtown Mall, where the march started and which has a capacity of 3,500, was overflowing. |
| Virginia | Chesapeake | | 50 | City Hall |
| Virginia | Danville | | 60+ | Danville Municipal Building. Retiring Danville Mayor John Gilstrap attended. |
| Virginia | Fredericksburg | | 400 | intersection of Virginia State Route 3 and William Street |
| Virginia | Manassas | | 300+ | intersection of Virginia State Route 234 Business and Sudley Manor Drive |
| Virginia | Newport News | | 200 | March down Jefferson Avenue |
| Virginia | Norfolk | | 3,000–5,000 | Demonstrators gathered in front of Nauticus & Town Point Park |
| Virginia | Onancock | | 70+ | march along Market Street to the town park |
| Virginia | Richmond | | 5,000+ | Martin Luther King Jr. Middle School - MLKJ Memorial Bridge - Virginia State Capitol. Richmond Mayor Levar Stoney & US Sen. Tim Kaine spoke before the crowd. |
| Virginia | Staunton | | 200+ | Staunton Library, Churchville Ave - Augusta County Courthouse |
| Virginia | Williamsburg | | ~1,000 | March down Duke of Gloucester Street in Colonial Williamsburg |
| Virginia | Winchester | | 600 | Shenandoah Civil War Museum |
| Washington | Aberdeen | | 125 | Zelasko Park |
| Washington | Auburn | | | Homewood Terrace |
| Washington | Bellingham | | 3,000 | City Hall |
| Washington | Blaine | | 16 | parking lot, corner of H St & Mitchell Ave - Peace Arch Park; event organized by two Blaine High School students |
| Washington | Bremerton | | ~8 | At first, the only people to show for the rally at Evergreen Park were the three student organizers, but they were eventually greeted by Bremerton Mayor Greg Wheeler. A few more people joined the rally, which then marched to Warren Avenue Bridge, across from Olympic College. |
| Washington | Eastsound | | 100+ | Eastsound Village Green, Orcas Island |
| Washington | Ellensburg | | 100+ | intersection of Fifth Avenue and Main Street, near the County Courthouse |
| Washington | Everett | | thousands | Snohomish County Courthouse. Everett Mayor Cassie Franklin was present. It was the largest political gathering in downtown Everett since a Trump campaign rally in August 2016. |
| Washington | Friday Harbor | | 600+ | San Juan County Courthouse - Spring Street, Second Street & back |
| Washington | Kingston | | | |
| Washington | Langley | | 300 | Residents put down about 200 pairs of donated shoes of all kinds — boots, sneakers, dress shoes, sandals — lining them up on the grass facing Cascade Avenue, to represent the children killed by gun violence in America. |
| Washington | Longview | | 320 | Longview Civic Circle |
| Washington | Marysville | | thousands | Asbery Field. Some of the assembled students from Marysville Pilchuck High were survivors from a school shooting in October 2014. |
| Washington | Moses Lake | | 45 | Sinkiuse Square - Frontier Middle School |
| Washington | Mount Vernon | | 1,000 | Mount Vernon High School - Skagit County Courthouse |
| Washington | North Bend | | 400 | corners of North Bend Way & Bendigo Blvd |
| Washington | Olympia | | 4,500 | Legislative Building |
| Washington | Richland | | 2,000+ | Howard Amon Park |
| Washington | Seattle | | 25,000–50,000 | In an event organized by Tahoma High School, Rhiannon Rasaretnam, held on Saturday morning, thousands of students, supporters and families marched from Cal Anderson Park to downtown Seattle and the Seattle Center calling for "stricter gun control measures and safer schools." Speakers included Governor Jay Inslee and Connecticut Governor Dan Malloy, on whose watch the Sandy Hook Elementary School shooting occurred. Singer Dave Matthews performed at the rally. |
| Washington | Sequim | | 75 | intersection of Sequim Avenue and Washington Street |
| Washington | Silverdale | | 500 | down Silverdale Way and around the Kitsap Mall |
| Washington | Spokane | | 5,000 | Riverfront Park; thousands of people attended the march in Spokane - according to organizers, the largest crowd seen in the city since the Second Women's March. |
| Washington | Tacoma | | 1,000+ | People's Park, Hilltop neighborhood |
| Washington | Twisp | | 340 | Methow Valley Community Center |
| Washington | Vancouver | | 1,000 | Two separate crowds at Hough Elementary School and O.O. Howard House (home to Jaime Herrera Beutler's office) marched through downtown, converging at Esther Short Park for a rally. |
| Washington | Vashon | | 350–400 | Vashon High School - Village Green |
| Washington | Walla Walla | | hundreds | First Congregational Church |
| Washington | Wenatchee | | 734 | parking lot rally - march to Memorial Park and back |
| Washington | White Salmon | | | event planned at Rheingarten Park |
| Washington | Yakima | | 300 | About 300 "students, parents, educators and activists" walked from the rally at Millennium Plaza through downtown Yakima. |
| West Virginia | Beckley | | 40 | Shoemaker Square |
| West Virginia | Charleston | | ~50 | WV State Capitol steps |
| West Virginia | Huntington | | 100 | Heritage Station - Federal Building |
| West Virginia | Lewisburg | | 13 | Green Space Park; event sponsored by Greater Greenbrier Valley Indivisible |
| West Virginia | Logan | | | |
| West Virginia | Morgantown | | 300+ | WVU Coliseum |
| West Virginia | Parkersburg | | 30 | Market St to Wood County Courthouse |
| West Virginia | Wheeling | | hundreds | Heritage Port |
| Wisconsin | Appleton | | 583 | Pierce Park - City Park. |
| Wisconsin | Ashland | | | |
| Wisconsin | Elkhart Lake | | several hundred | East Rhine Street |
| Wisconsin | Ephraim | | 80 | Demonstrators held a postcard writing event and sent 1,200 postcards to elected officials. |
| Wisconsin | Fond du Lac | | several dozen | Marian University March For Our Lives |
| Wisconsin | Fort Atkinson | | 200 | Main Street Bridge |
| Wisconsin | Green Bay | | 800–1000 | 200–300 people gathered at CityDeck, and grew to 800–1,000 (police estimate) in marching to the Brown County Courthouse. |
| Wisconsin | Janesville | | 400+ | Lower Courthouse Park |
| Wisconsin | Kenosha | | 100 | Library Square to Civic Center Park on Sheridan Road |
| Wisconsin | La Crosse | | 1,000 | The march of about 1000 community members and students traveled downtown, rallying in Cameron Park. There, 20 speakers, including students, teachers, and other community members addressed the crowd. |
| Wisconsin | Madison | | 2,500 | Wisconsin State Capitol; US Sen. Tammy Baldwin spoke before the crowd, criticizing the lack of action from federal legislators. On Sunday, March 25, a group of 40 students set off from Madison on a five-day, 50-mile walk (in 37-degree weather) towards Janesville, the hometown of GOP House Speaker Paul Ryan. |
| Wisconsin | Milwaukee | | 12,000 | Milwaukee County Courthouse - Red Arrow Park; Milwaukee Mayor Tom Barrett was present |
| Wisconsin | Minocqua | | 200 | St. Matthias Episcopal Church - Torpy Park |
| Wisconsin | Racine | | 250 | Corner of Washington Avenue and West Boulevard |
| Wisconsin | Sister Bay | | 32 | Resident of the Good Samaritan Scandia Village gathered for a morning vigil for the students of Marjory Stoneman Douglas High School. |
| Wisconsin | Spooner | | 20 | Centennial Park, corner of Walnut and River Streets. |
| Wisconsin | Stevens Point | | 44 | University of Wisconsin–Stevens Point campus. |
| Wisconsin | Wausau | | 200 | Demonstrators marched to US Rep. Sean Duffy's office. |
| Wisconsin | West Bend | | | |
| Wyoming | Cody | | 100 | City Park |
| Wyoming | Jackson | | 250–260 | Town Square. |
| Wyoming | Laramie | | 517 | First Street Plaza. |
| Wyoming | Pinedale | | 30 | American Legion Park |
| Wyoming | Sheridan | | 60 | People marched along Main Street. |

== Worldwide ==
Listed below are marches outside the United States in support of the 2018 March for Our Lives.

- Argentina
- Australia
- Austria
- Belgium
- Brazil
- Canada
- Chile
- Colombia
- Denmark
- Finland
- France
- Germany
- Ghana
- Haiti
- Hong Kong
- Iceland
- India
- Ireland
- Israel
- Italy
- Japan
- Lithuania
- Mauritius
- Micronesia
- Mozambique
- Netherlands
- New Zealand
- Norway
- Philippines
- Romania
- South Korea
- Spain
- Sweden
- Switzerland
- United Kingdom
- Vietnam

| Country | Locations | Photo | Approximate attendance | Notes |
|---|---|---|---|---|
| Argentina | Buenos Aires | | 30 | U.S. Embassy - ambassador's residence |
| Australia | Brisbane | | 50 | Parliament House |
| Australia | Canberra | | 50 | US Embassy |
| Australia | Melbourne | | | US Consulate |
| Australia | Sydney | | 400 | Hyde Park The Chair of Gun Control Australia Sam Lee addressed the gathering. |
| Austria | Vienna | | 100 | Ballhausplatz; event organized by Democrats Abroad Austria |
| Belgium | Brussels | | 200+ | city's opera house; Place de la Monnaie |
| Brazil | São Paulo | | | outside the US Embassy |
| Canada | Calgary | | 200+ | Among the crowd of over 200 people at the protest, held in front of the United States Consulate General Embassy in Calgary, was Matthew Greenfield, a former Marjory Stoneman Douglas High School student, and his University of Calgary Dinos men's ice hockey teammates. |
| Canada | Cambridge | | 200 | (Friday, March 23) Preston High School |
| Canada | Edmonton | | 100+ | Over a hundred people attended the rally at the Alberta Legislature and March in Edmonton, including Melissa Hennig and Lori Davis, who both survived the 2017 Las Vegas shooting. Hennig spoke at the rally, remembering the “terror, confusion and panic". She said, "While I don’t know the ins and outs of assault rifles, I can tell you what it’s like to be on the other end of one ... I can tell you something more needs to be done — something more than thoughts and prayers." |
| Canada | Fredericton | | 50+ | New Brunswick Legislative Building - City Hall |
| Canada | Guelph | | 80 | Market Square |
| Canada | Kitchener-Waterloo | | 50+ | Wilfrid Laurier University Concourse |
| Canada | London | | 100 | Victoria Park |
| Canada | Montreal | | hundreds | Cabot Square - march down Ste-Catherine St - US Consulate |
| Canada | Ottawa | | 400 | Ottawa youth took the "most prominent role" in the rally that began on Parliament Hill and continued to the U.S. Embassy. Colonel By Secondary School's seventeen-year-old Edna Rodriguez, one of the core organizers of the student-led read aloud a letter to U.S. Ambassador Kelly Knight Craft written by Ottawa youth Meredith Wing and Ainsley Skelly. |
| Canada | Quebec City | | several dozen | Parc Jardin Jean-Paul l'Allier (at corner of Blvd. Charest & Rue de la Couronne) |
| Canada | Sherbrooke | | 50 | Students of Bishop's University met on the campus Quad for brief speeches and marched down through the centre of Lennoxville and past St. Antoine Elementary schools as a reminder that all students deserve a safe and secure learning environment. |
| Canada | St. John's | | | event planned at Harbourside Park |
| Canada | Stratford | | | "Citizens of Stratford" rallied outside City Hall |
| Canada | Thompson | | 50+ | In Manitoba (Canada's northernmost gun-control event), high school students from R.D. Parker Collegiate marched a 3-km loop around Thompson Drive and Cree Road, which was littered with ice and snow. |
| Canada | Toronto | | hundreds | The Toronto March started at Nathan Phillips Square, marched passed the U.S. Consulate General Toronto, and ended at Queen's Park. |
| Canada | Vancouver | | hundreds | Marchers gathered at Vancouver's Jack Poole Plaza, then wove through the city's downtown core before passing by the U.S. Consulate. |
| Canada | Victoria | | | Legislative Assembly |
| Chile | Santiago | | | US Embassy Santiago |
| Colombia | Bogotá | | 20 | outside the US Embassy |
| Denmark | Copenhagen | | 500 | US Embassy, Østerbro district |
| Finland | Helsinki | | 29 | Kansalaistori |
| France | Aix-en-Provence | | 150 | Rally Square |
| France | Bordeaux | | 40 | Grand Théâtre, Opera National de Bordeaux |
| France | Lyon | | 80 | in front of the Lycée Edouard Herriot, 6 Place Edgar Quinet; event organized by Lyon chapter of Democrats Abroad |
| France | Nantes | | 20–25 | Cours des 50 Otages |
| France | Paris | | 100 | Democrats Abroad France held the Paris rally at Place du Trocadero, near the Eiffel Tower. |
| France | Strasbourg | | few dozen | Place Kléber |
| France | Toulouse | | several dozen | Place du Capitole |
| Germany | Berlin | | 500 | Hundreds staged a "die-in" near the Brandenburg Gate. |
| Germany | Bonn | | few dozen | Bottlerplatz 53111 |
| Germany | Frankfurt | | 50–60 | Opernplatz Frankfurt - Römer Platz in the Altstadt |
| Germany | Hamburg | | 100 | Rathausmarkt 1 |
| Germany | Heidelberg | | 21 | email-writing get together |
| Germany | Munich | | 175–200 | Königinstraße |
| Germany | Wiesbaden | | | Wiesbaden/Mainz Chapter of Democrats Abroad Germany planned a candlelight vigil between the two entrances to the underground parking at Dernsches Gelände |
| Ghana | Accra | | | |
| Haiti | Port-au-Prince | | 12 | 17 Rue Pinchinat, Pétion-Ville |
| Hong Kong | Hong Kong | | 800 | Central harborfront |
| Iceland | Reykjavík | | dozens | There are over 600 Americans in Iceland, and dozens of them took part in a march that ended at Austurvöllur, the square in front of the Althing (the Parliament of Iceland) where speeches were given. During one speech, a man walking through the crowd with a knife in his hand was spotted, thrown to the ground, then escorted away before police showed up; his motivations remain unclear. |
| India | Mumbai | | 100 | On Sunday, March 25, Mumbaikars marched through the Carter Road Promenade to the US Consulate in Bandra Kurla Complex, to express solidarity with the United States (India reportedly exercises some of the strictest gun control laws in the world). |
| Ireland | Cork | | | |
| Ireland | Dublin | | 150 | gathering across the road from the U.S. Embassy in Ballsbridge. |
| Israel | Tel Aviv | | 200 | Gathering in front of the U.S. Embassy |
| Italy | Florence | | 28 | Piazza San Lorenzo; event organized by Indivisible Tuscany |
| Italy | Milan | | 40 | Piazza Camillo Benso di Cavour |
| Italy | Rome | | 100 | US Embassy; event organized by the Rome chapter of American Expats for Positive Change (AEPC) |
| Japan | Nagoya | | | |
| Japan | Tokyo | | 50+ | Hachikō Square. |
| Lithuania | Vilnius | | 17 | Kurdirkas Square |
| Mauritius | Port Louis | | 10 | Les Jardins De La Compagnie |
| Micronesia | Pohnpei | | | |
| Mozambique | Maputo | | | |
| Netherlands | Amsterdam | | hundreds | Protestors gathered at the US consulate on the Museumplein, holding posters of Vermeer's Girl with a Pearl Earring and chanting slogans such as "Who makes history? We make history!" |
| Netherlands | The Hague | | 30 | Protestors met at the US Embassy, the first demonstration to be held at the embassy's new building in Wassenaar. |
| New Zealand | Auckland | | 160 | Albert Park |
| New Zealand | Christchurch | | | Cathedral Square |
| New Zealand | Dunedin | | 100 | Union Hall, University of Otago |
| New Zealand | Wellington | | 50+ | Midland Park / Parliament House |
| Norway | Oslo | | 40 | Frognerparken, near statue of Abraham Lincoln |
| Philippines | Manila | | | |
| Romania | Bucharest | | | |
| South Korea | Chungju | | | event planned near Chungju Stadium |
| Spain | Barcelona | | 75+ | Plaça de Catalunya |
| Spain | Ibiza | | 11 | |
| Spain | Madrid | | 40+ | A small crowd - almost all of them Americans - braved a cold Saturday to gather in front of the American embassy. |
| Spain | Mallorca | | 25+ | |
| Spain | Palma | | 50+ | |
| Spain | Seville | | 28 | Merchant Pub, Calle Canalejas 12 |
| Sweden | Stockholm | | 30 | Kungsträdgården |
| Switzerland | Geneva | | ~100 | Place des Nations, UN European headquarters |
| United Kingdom | Belfast | | 10 | Belfast City Hall, Donegall Square |
| United Kingdom | Edinburgh | | hundreds | U.S. Consulate. |
| United Kingdom | London | | hundreds | Hundreds gathered outside the U.S. embassy in London and staged a die-in. |
| United Kingdom | St Andrews | | 80 | (April 3) Demonstrators gathered at the University of St Andrews. |
| Vietnam | Hanoi | | | |
