= ACA Memorial Park =

Public park and monument in Binghamton, New York

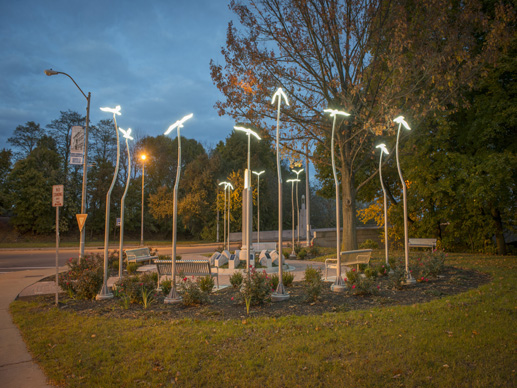
- The ACA Memorial Park at dusk
- Interactive map of ACA Memorial Park
- Location: Binghamton, New York, United States
- Coordinates: 42°06′12″N 75°54′57″W
- Designer: Madeleine Cotts, ICI-BCK
- Fabricator: IBI-BCK and others
- Beginning date: 2012
- Completion date: 2013
- Inauguration date: April 3, 2014

The ACA Memorial Park is a public park and monument located in downtown Binghamton, New York at the intersection of Clinton and Front Streets. The park serves as a memorial to the thirteen victims of the 2009 Binghamton shooting at the American Civic Association. Following the tragedy, the park's creation was driven by a desire to provide a lasting tribute and a place for community healing. IBI-BCK Architects was selected to design and oversee construction of the park. The park incorporates symbolic elements such as a 'broken' column, glass bird sculptures, and personalized memorial plaques, reflecting the collective vision of the victim's families.

After the American Civic Association withdrew from the project, the City of Binghamton partnered with the families, providing the land and facilitating fundraising efforts. The park took four years of fundraising and construction to complete.

== Origins and history ==
The origin of the park can be traced to an initial meeting between Omri Yigal and David Marsland, in late April 2009. Both men had lost their foreign-born wives in the shooting. Yigal expressed a desire to create a memorial garden on the grounds of the ACA and Marsland was interested in doing something with the other families who had lost loved ones in the tragedy.

After this initial meeting, both men reached out to the other family members and the ACA to gather a group to promote this idea. A number of meetings were held over the summer of 2009, involving family members, members of the ACA board, representatives of the City of Binghamton, and local architects.

Mr. Marsland was asked to head the fundraising efforts on behalf of the other family members. Fund raising efforts lasted nearly four years to accumulate the nearly $230,000 required for the final design.

Madeleine Cotts of IBI-BCK Architects was selected as the architect and oversaw construction of the park itself.

In the fall of 2009, the American Civic Association abruptly withdrew from the project for reasons that were never made public. The committee, now composed only of the family members of the 13 people slain, instead formed a partnership with the current administration of the City of Binghamton, led by then Mayor Matthew Ryan, in order to allow donations to the park to be tax-deductible. City Council met in early 2010 to discuss the project and approved legislation creating a dedicated account for the purposes of accepting donations for the construction of the park on an existing city lot near the Clinton Street bridge, just north of the ACA.

== Location and design ==
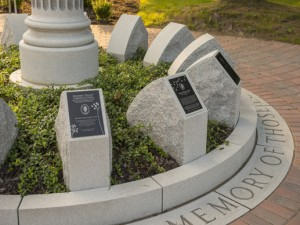
A close up of the plaques dedicated to the lives of the people who were killed on April 3, 2009

The design of the park was directly based on suggestions from the committee formed of family members. These elements included a vertical 'broken' column, to symbolize a life cut short, bird sculptures placed on posts in an arrangement suggestive of a flock being disturbed and flying away, memorial plaques with text and graphics designed by each family, and a surrounding garden of roses and evergreens, utilizing a tree that existed at the final site.

=== Fundraising ===
Initially, fundraising was carried out as a private effort by David Marsland assisted by his mother, Amy. A list of foundations was drafted and mailings sent out, with advice from the architectural team at IBI-BCK, David Young and Madeleine Cotts. The Raymond Foundation granted $5,000 to underwrite the architectural design work and project plan. An early response came from Dr. Lee, who offered to underwrite the entire cost of the central column with a $60,000 donation. After giving a speech to a lunchtime meeting of the Binghamton Rotary, Marsland was approached by area businessman David Alamo, who offered to expand the fundraising team. Marsland reached out to NBT Bank vice-president Jeff Lake, and Alamo recruited George Akel of Giant Family Markets to complete the expanded fundraising team. This combined team then worked on contacting area businesses, individuals and foundations to raise the funds necessary to construct the memorial.

=== Construction ===
By late 2012, over $200,000 had been raised toward the construction. Bids were let through the City of Binghamton and awarded to local firms. Milon Townsend of Rochester, NY was selected as the artisan to create the signature glass birds and cast glass column.

=== Legacy ===
In the years since construction, the Park has become a popular landmark in the City of Binghamton, and annual observances of the tragedy are marked by the laying of flowers and other activities at the park. The original Committee of family members oversee the Park in partnership with the City of Binghamton, who donated the property on which the memorial stands.
