= March for Our Lives Portland =

2018 protest in Portland, Oregon, U.S.

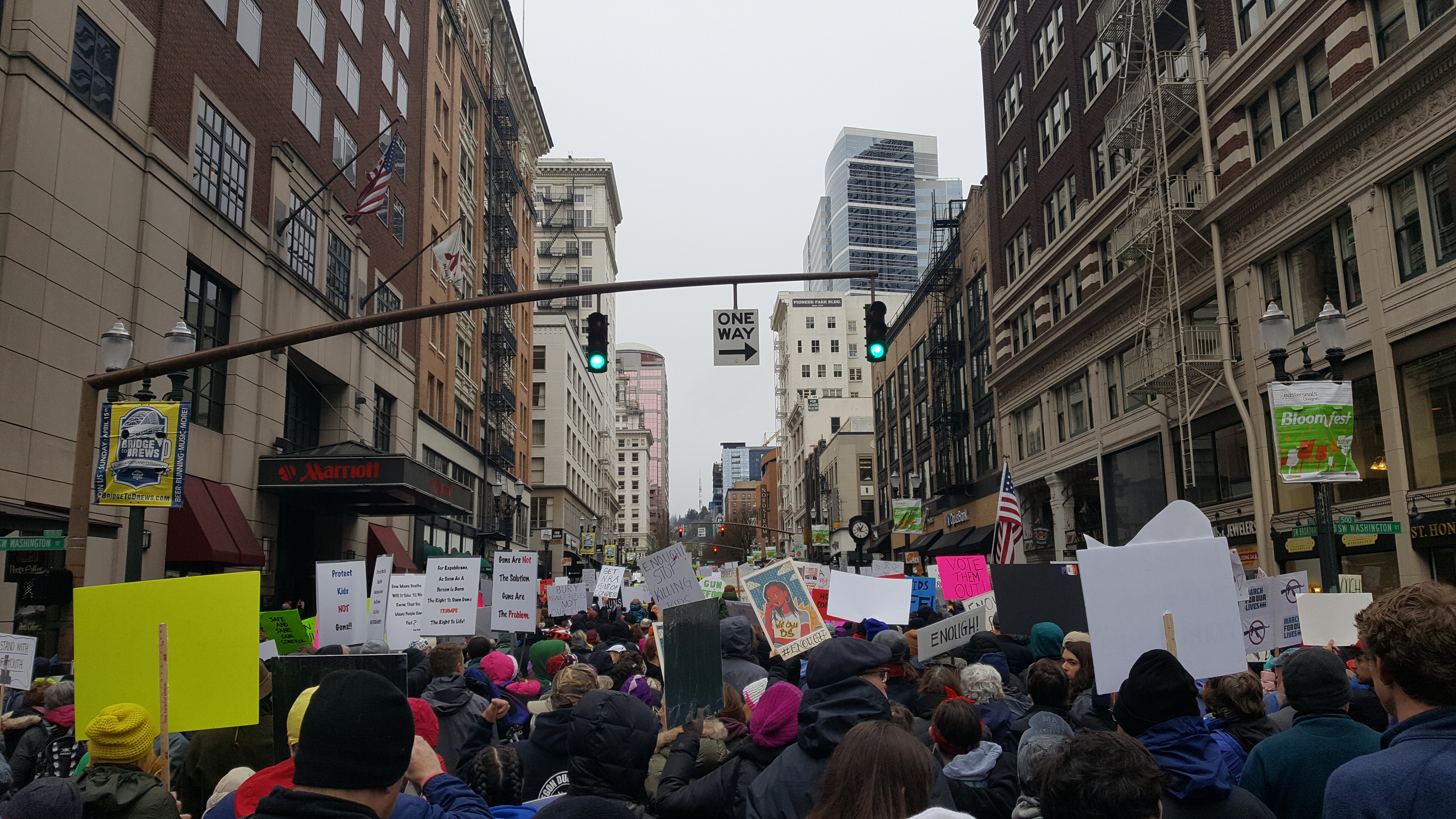
- Protestors marching from the North Park Blocks to Pioneer Courthouse Square via Broadway
- Date: March 24, 2018
- Location: Portland, Oregon, U.S.
- Also known as: March for Our Lives Portland, OR
- Type: Protest march
- Organized by: Eliana Andrews; Alyssa Diaz; Zoe Dumm; Alexandria Goddard; Finn Jacobson; Calum Nguyen; Sophie Rupp; Ryan Tran; Kien Truong; Tyler White; Ellie Younger

March for Our Lives Portland (officially March for Our Lives Portland, OR) was a protest held in Portland, Oregon, as part of March for Our Lives, a series of rallies and marches in Washington, D.C., and more than 800 cities across the world on March 24, 2018. Students organized the event, which included a march from the North Park Blocks to Pioneer Courthouse Square where a rally featured speakers, a performance by rock band Portugal. The Man, and a surprise appearance by rapper Black Thought of hip-hop band The Roots. The protest was the city's largest since the January 2017 Women's March on Portland; the Portland Police Bureau estimated a crowd size of 12,000.

== Background ==
March for Our Lives was a student-led demonstration in support of a tightening of U.S. gun control laws on March 24, 2018, in Washington, D.C., with more than 800 sibling events throughout the United States and around the world. Student organizers from Never Again MSD planned the march in collaboration with the nonprofit organization Everytown for Gun Safety. The event followed the Stoneman Douglas High School shooting, which many media outlets described as a possible tipping point for gun control legislation.

Protesters urged the introduction of universal background checks on gun sales, the raising of the federal minimum age for gun ownership and possession to 21, the closure of the gun show loophole, the restoration of the 1994 Federal Assault Weapons Ban, and a ban on the sale of high-capacity magazines in the U.S. Turnout across the country was estimated at between 1.2 and 2 million people, making it one of the largest protests in American history.

== Local organizers and planning ==
Local student organizers included: Eliana Andrews; Alyssa Diaz; Zoe Dumm; Alexandria Goddard; Finn Jacobson; Calum Nguyen; Sophie Rupp; Ryan Tran; Kien Truong; Tyler White; and Ellie Younger.

According to the Portland Police Bureau, organizers obtained proper permits for the demonstration. The rally was scheduled to start at 10 am and end by 2 pm. The Portland-based rock band Portugal. The Man contacted organizers and offered to help, and practiced with a local choir prior to the concert. On the event's Facebook page in the lead-up to the event, around 9,000 people indicated plans to attend, and approximately 20,000 people had expressed interest in participating.

The Portland Bureau of Transportation planned to close all lanes of West Burnside Street from Broadway to 9th Avenue, as well as Southwest Broadway from Burnside to Yamhill Street, from approximately 10:30 am to noon. The agency and event organizers also encouraged attendees and other downtown visitors to use public transit and to expect delays in the vicinity of the march route. The MAX Light Rail stations Pioneer Square South and Pioneer Square North were temporarily closed, and several bus lines had detours for a few hours. Online taxi firm Lyft offered march participants free rides in Portland and 49 other U.S. cities.

The route of the march was decided upon by event organizers and police, and plans to have safety monitors present were made.

== Demonstration ==
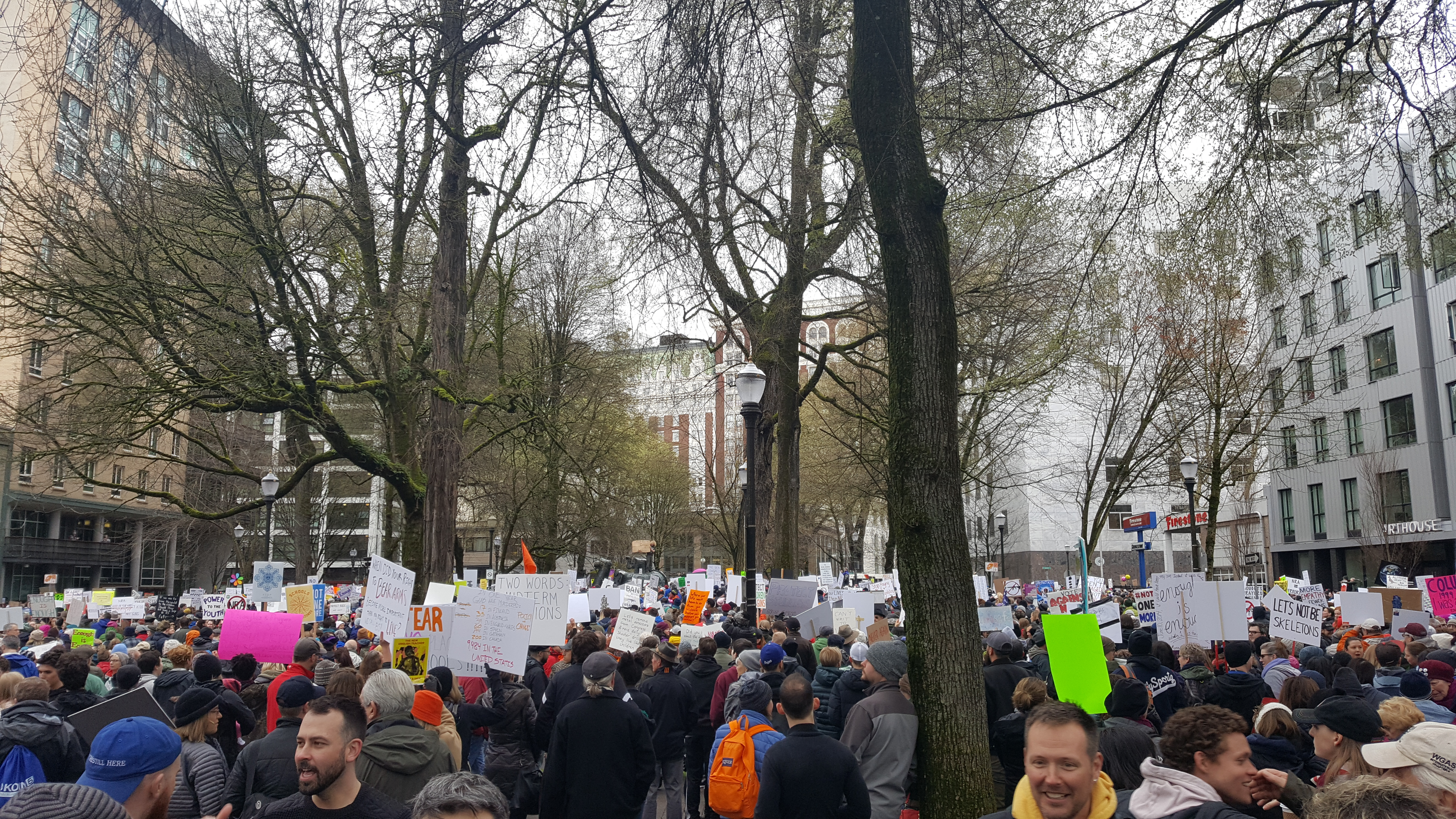
Demonstrators gathered at the North Park Blocks

Participants gathered at the North Park Blocks and marched to Pioneer Courthouse Square via Burnside and Broadway. The rally began on time; protestors started marching at 10:30 am. The march route was less than one-half mile (0.80 km) long and lasted approximately 90 minutes.

At Pioneer Courthouse Square, organizers held a moment of silence and rang a bell 17 times to commemorate victims of the Stoneman Douglas High School shooting. Starting around 11:30 am, eight local students ranging in age from grades 8 to 12 delivered speeches and performed songs and poems advocating gun control and school safety. They encouraged attendees to vote, remain politically active, and hold their politicians accountable. KOIN described the students' speeches as "articulate, informed, engaging and captivating".

Portugal. The Man performed "So American", "Feel It Still", and Oasis' "Don't Look Back in Anger", and gave a "rousing" performance of Bob Dylan's "The Times They Are a-Changin'" with a choir of students from Vernon Elementary School. Lead singer and guitarist John Gourley said March for Our Lives' mission is nonpartisan. Rapper Black Thought of The Roots made an onstage surprise appearance with the band.

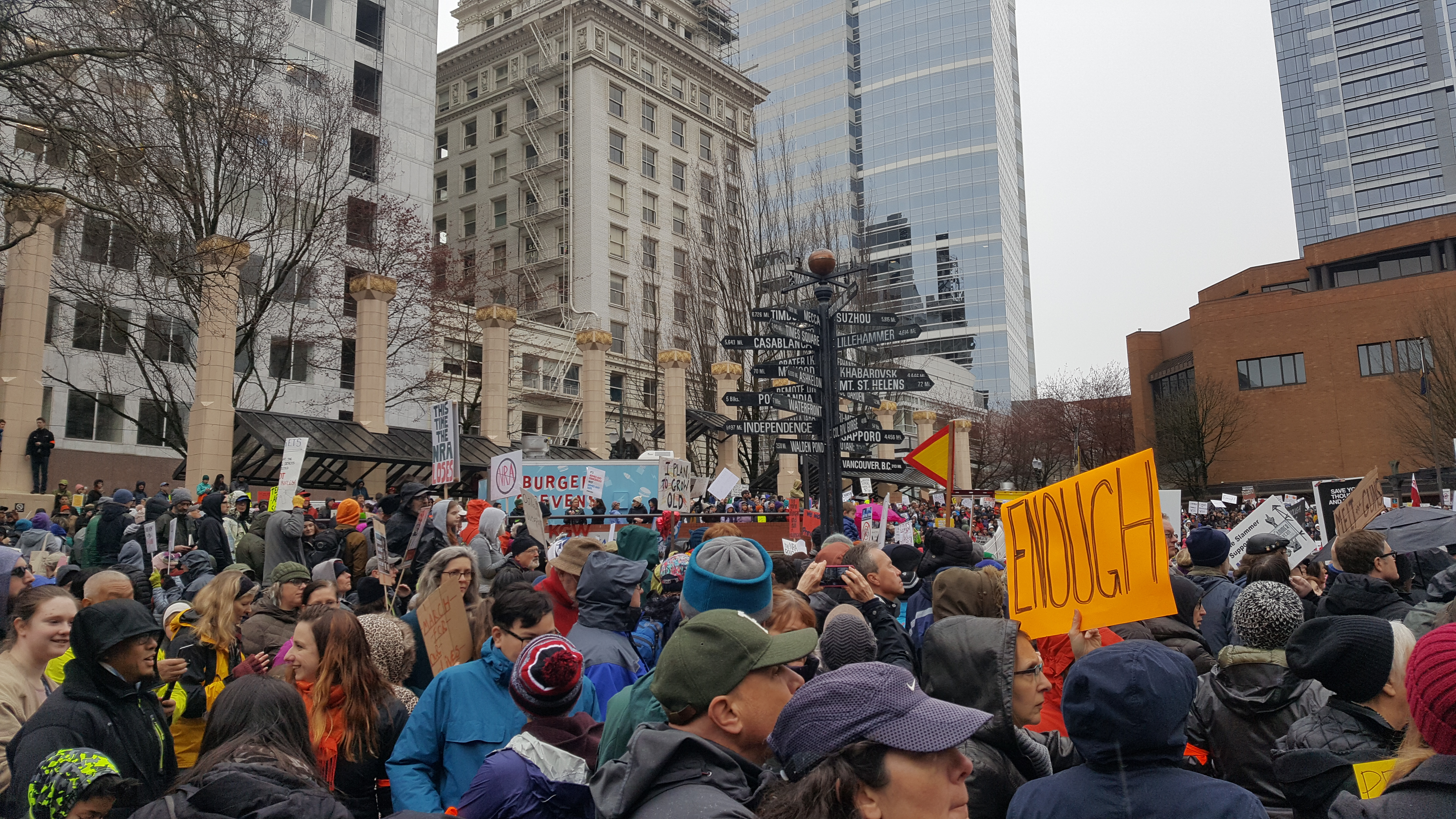
Protestors at Pioneer Courthouse Square, the march route's end location

The protest was Portland's largest since the Women's March on Portland in January 2017, with more than 10,000 participants. The Portland Police Bureau's Traffic Division estimated 12,000 people attended. Event organizers said there were between 20,000 and 25,000 demonstrators. The Oregonian reported a crowd estimate of 12,000, and noted the presence of all age groups. Willamette Week said "tens of thousands" of people were in attendance and described the crowd as "massive and diverse", consisting of "families, teachers, grandparents and groups of students of all ages".

Counter-protestors, including members of Patriot Prayer, were present but the event was peaceful. Suzanne Bonamici and Earl Blumenauer, U.S. representatives for Oregon's 1st and 3rd congressional districts, respectively, participated in the march. Also in attendance were 15 Marjory Stoneman Douglas High School alumni living in Portland and teachers from Umpqua Community College, where nine people were killed in a mass shooting in 2015.

== See also ==
- List of March for Our Lives locations
- March for Science Portland (2017)
