= Jill Techel =

American politician

Former Mayor of Napa
- Incumbent
- Assumed office 2005

Personal details
- Born: Grand Forks, North Dakota, U.S.
- Party: [Independent]
- Children: 2
- Education: University of North Dakota

Jill Techel is an American politician currently serving as the mayor of Napa, California.

== Biography ==
Techel was born in Grand Forks, North Dakota. Techel attended University of North Dakota and graduated in 1969. Traveling west, she originally settled in Salem, Oregon, where she started working as a field director training administrator in the Santiam Girl Scout Council. After moving to Napa, in 1971, she continued her work in the Girl Scouts and assumed the same position in the Napa-Solano Girl Scout Council. She later retired from the Girl Scouts, but continued to participate in community events and discussions. Techel is divorced. She has two grown children, Eric and Kristen, and four grandchildren.

== Political career ==
Starting in the 1970s, Techel has served on numerous boards, commissions, and committees, including the Napa Valley Unified School District.

After the death of Mayor Ed Solomon in a truck accident, Techel was appointed to fill the vacancy. Techel successfully ran for a full term as Mayor of Napa in 2005. She was then elected for a second term, unopposed, in 2008, a third term in 2012, and a fourth term in 2016.
