= American Civic Association (Binghamton) =

Immigration services organization in Binghamton, New York, USA

The American Civic Association is an immigration services organization located in Binghamton, New York, that provides community integration services to immigrants and refugees in the Greater Binghamton region. It is unrelated to a former national organization and entity of the same name from the early 20th century.

The organization's services include refugee resettlement; citizenship classes; assistance with citizenship and green card information; and general help and assistance for immigration- and citizenship-related problems with services provided on a sliding scale of ability to pay by income. The organization is a member agency of (and therefore receives funding from) the United Way of Broome County. The ACA is a 501(c)(3) non-profit entity and is the only refugee resettlement agency in the Greater Binghamton area.

== History ==
The ACA was founded in 1939. At the time, the Binghamton area had a large number of European immigrants coming into the area that were working in the many factories of the Endicott Johnson Corporation. The agency later constructed an office and banquet facility on Front Street in the city and maintains these facilities currently for receptions, events, classes, and other activities.

The ACA's offices were the scene of a mass shooting in April 2009.
