= 1913 Binghamton Factory fire =

1913 fire in New York

Coordinates: 42°6′2″N 75°54′55″W

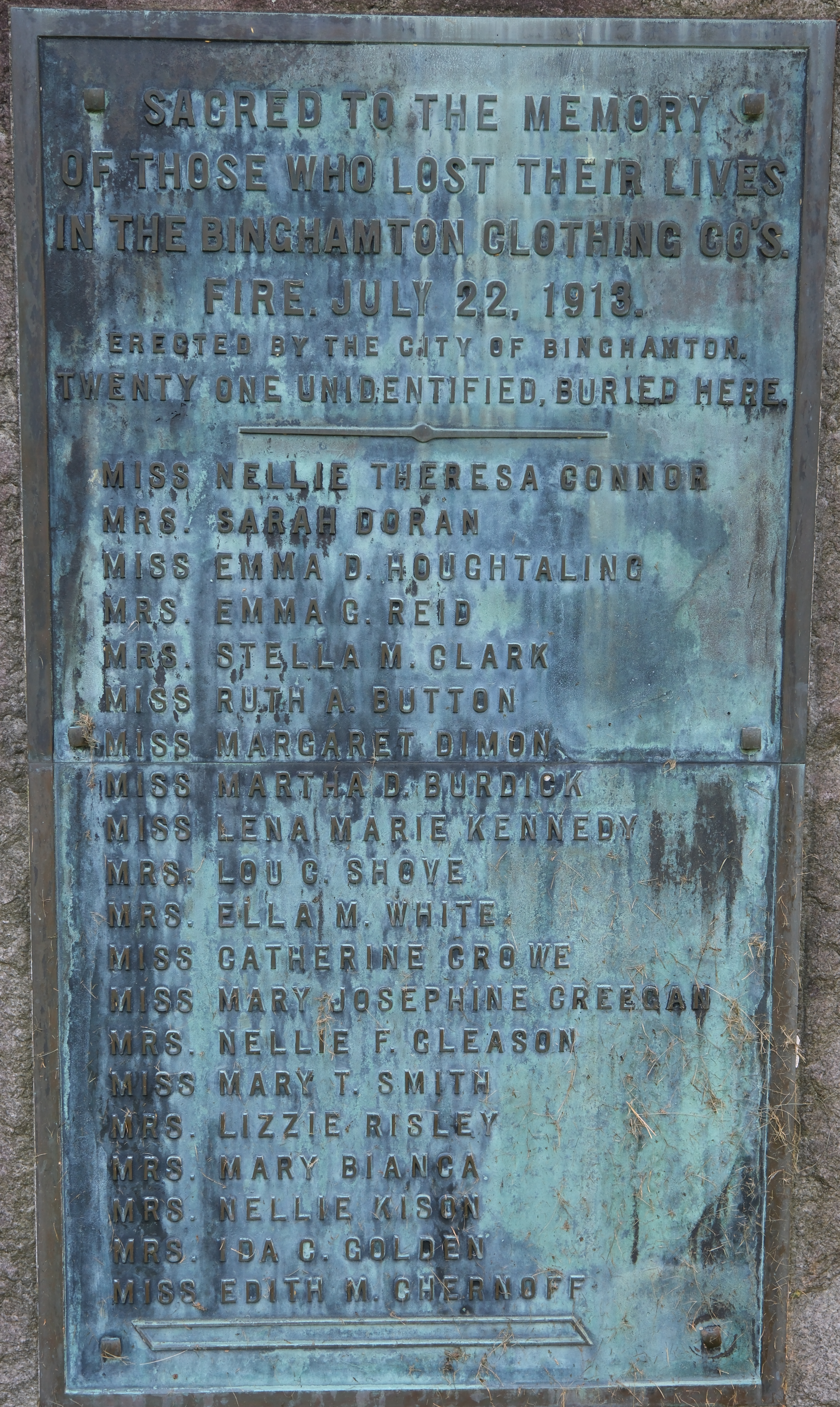
Plaque at Spring Forest Cemetery

The 1913 Binghamton factory fire occurred on July 22, 1913, on the premises of the Binghamton Clothing Company, in Binghamton, New York. It destroyed the Wall Street building in less than 20 minutes, killing 31 of the more than 100 people inside. Though not as deadly as the Triangle Shirtwaist Factory fire in 1911, it put even more pressure on New York officials to strengthen life safety codes, increase funding for more inspectors, and increase penalties for violations.

== Fire ==
The Binghamton Clothing Company was located in a former cigar factory on Wall Street, and produced men's overalls. The employees, mostly young women, were hard at work in the four-story building on that Tuesday afternoon. The exact number of workers is uncertain; early reports claimed as many as 150 were working, but after a few days the number settled between 110 and 125. Almost all the doors and windows were open due to the July heat, and a strong wind was blowing. Even so, the building was unusually hot. One of the employees noticed it at about 1 pm, and claimed she smelled smoke an hour later.

The fire likely began after lunch when an employee carelessly tossed a cigarette down into the second floor stairwell, where it landed on a pile of highly flammable plush material on the first floor. The high wind and the great ventilation provided by the open windows and doors combined to start a conflagration. The stairways quickly became chimneys for the smoke and flames, leading to the greatest loss of life on the third and fourth floors.

A fire alarm sounded at about 2:30 but many workers, lightly clothed due to the summer heat, initially refused to take the fire alarm seriously, believing it to be just another of the frequent fire drills. Unlike the serial rings of the fire drill gong, the actual alarm was sounding continuously, which may have confused some workers.

Nellie Connor was recognized for her efforts to save the lives of her co-workers. Employed by the company for 31 years, Nellie was looked upon as a mother figure by many of the girls at the factory. Although she did her best to hurry others out of the building, Nellie herself never made it out alive. A 16-year company foreman, Sidney Dimmock, was credited with carrying two women to safety before returning to the building to attempt to rescue others from the flames. He did not escape the smoke and flames. Reed Freeman, owner of the company, attempted to douse the flames with buckets of water, to no avail. He and his wife were able to raise the alarm and escaped along with many of the workers on the first and second floors.

At the time of the fire, the nearest fire company was busy on another call. By the time the Binghamton Fire Department arrived, the heat from the fire was so intense they were unable to get anywhere close to the building to attempt rescue. The structure was completely consumed and was a total loss by 4 pm, about 20 minutes after the first report of smoke. Firefighters were kept busy trying to save nearby structures that were endangered by flames fed by the steady breeze. Their efforts were hindered by low water pressure due to a continuing drought. The stone exterior of the post office building on Wall Street suffered severe scorching from the fire.

== Aftermath ==
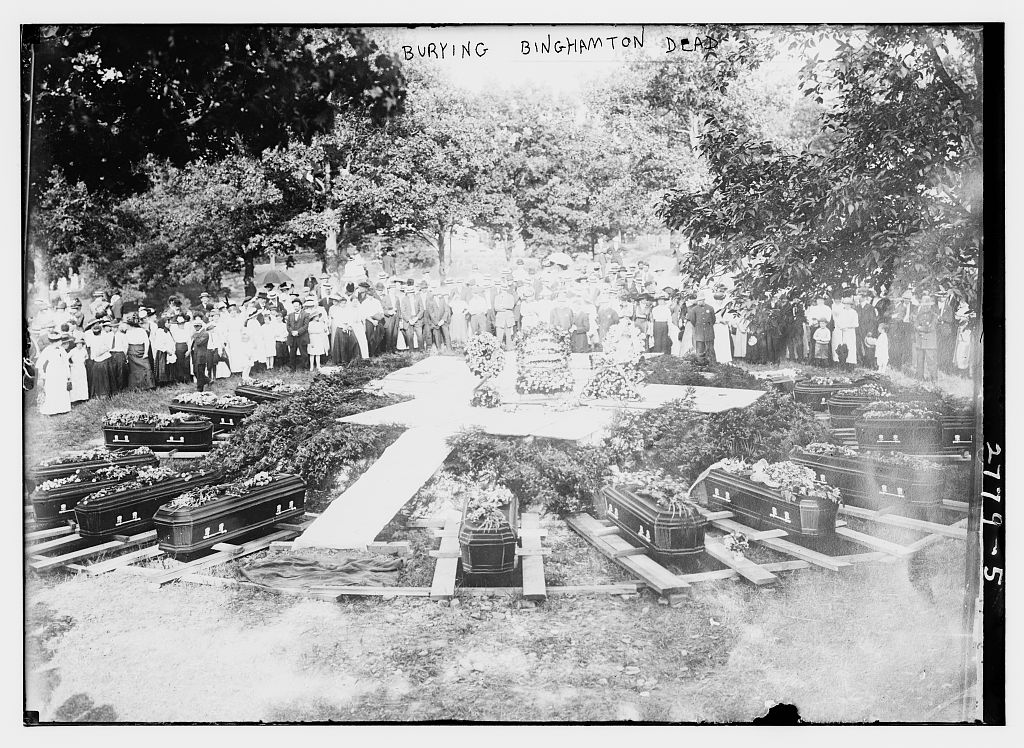
Burial of victims of the fire

In the coming days, thousands of mourners attended the funeral procession, and some of the remains, charred beyond recognition, were placed in a common grave at Spring Forest Cemetery. The fire is the largest loss of life from a single event to take place in Binghamton. A memorial to the victims is located in Spring Forest Cemetery, and a memorial plaque on Wall Street marks the location of the tragic fire.
