= Luma =

Luma or LUMA may refer to:

== Arts and entertainment ==
- LUMA Projection Arts Festival, an annual event in Binghamton, NY, US
- Unified Theory (band), formerly called Luma
- Luma (Mario), a fictional species from the video game Super Mario Galaxy

=== Organisations ===
- La Trobe University Museum of Art, at La Trobe University, Melbourne, Australia (LUMA)
- Loyola University Museum of Art, Chicago
- LUMA Foundation, an organisation that promotes artistic projects
- LUMA Arles, an art complex in Arles, France

== Companies ==
- LUMA Energy, a power utility company in Puerto Rico
- Luma Home, a former American Wi-Fi company

== Science and technology ==
=== Biology ===
- Luma (moth), a genus of moths of the family Crambidae
- Luma (plant), a genus of plants in the myrtle family
  - Amomyrtus luma, a species of tree in the myrtle family

=== Video ===
- Luma (video), a signal used in video technology
  - Luma, one of the channels of the Y′UV colorspace

== Places ==
- Luma (region), a region in northeast Albania and southwest Kosovo and historic Albanian tribe
- Luma, American Samoa, a village on the northwest coast of Taʻū Island in American Samoa

== Other uses ==
- Luma, one hundredth of an Armenian dram

== See also ==
- Lumë, a village in Kukës County, Albania
