= Binghamton, New York =

City in New York, United States

- City
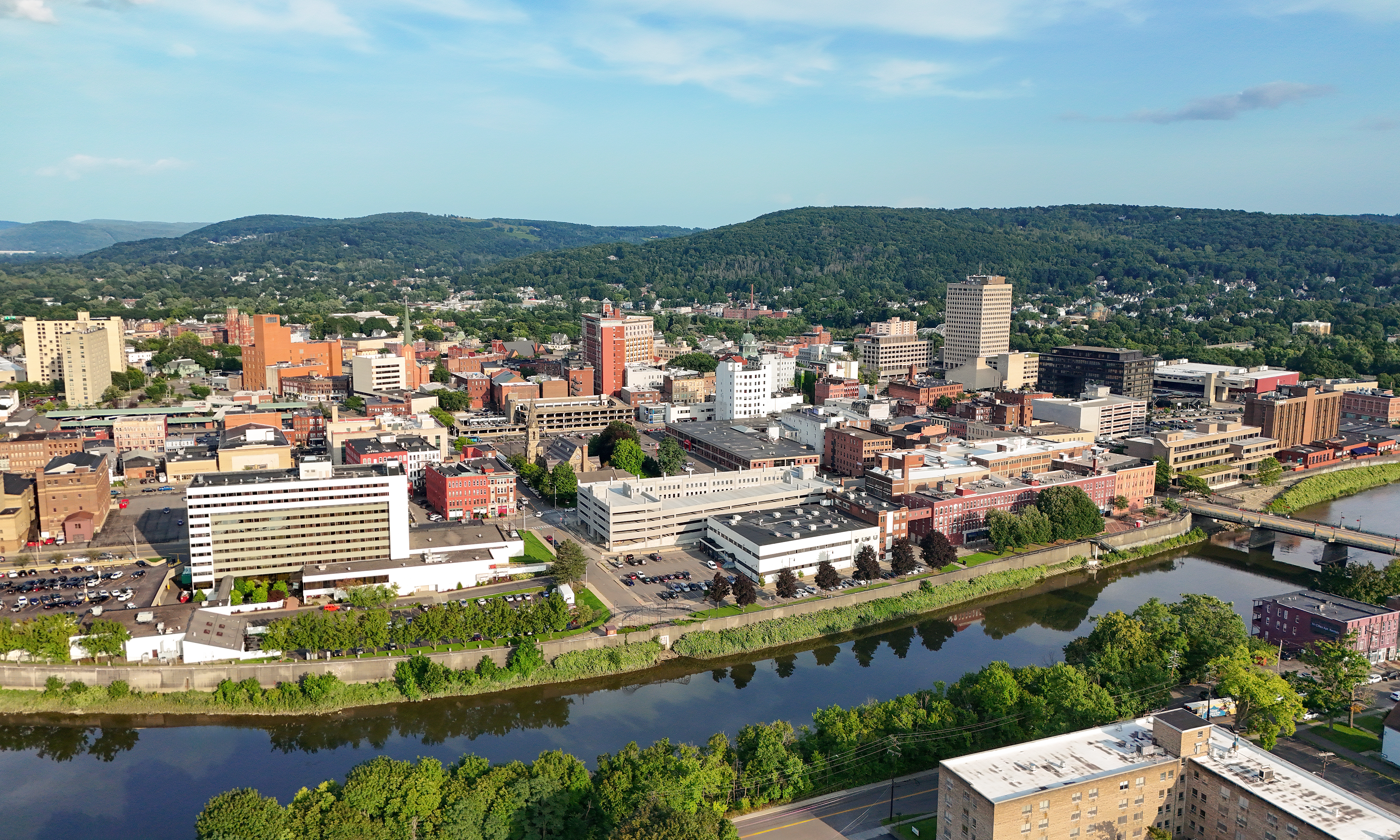
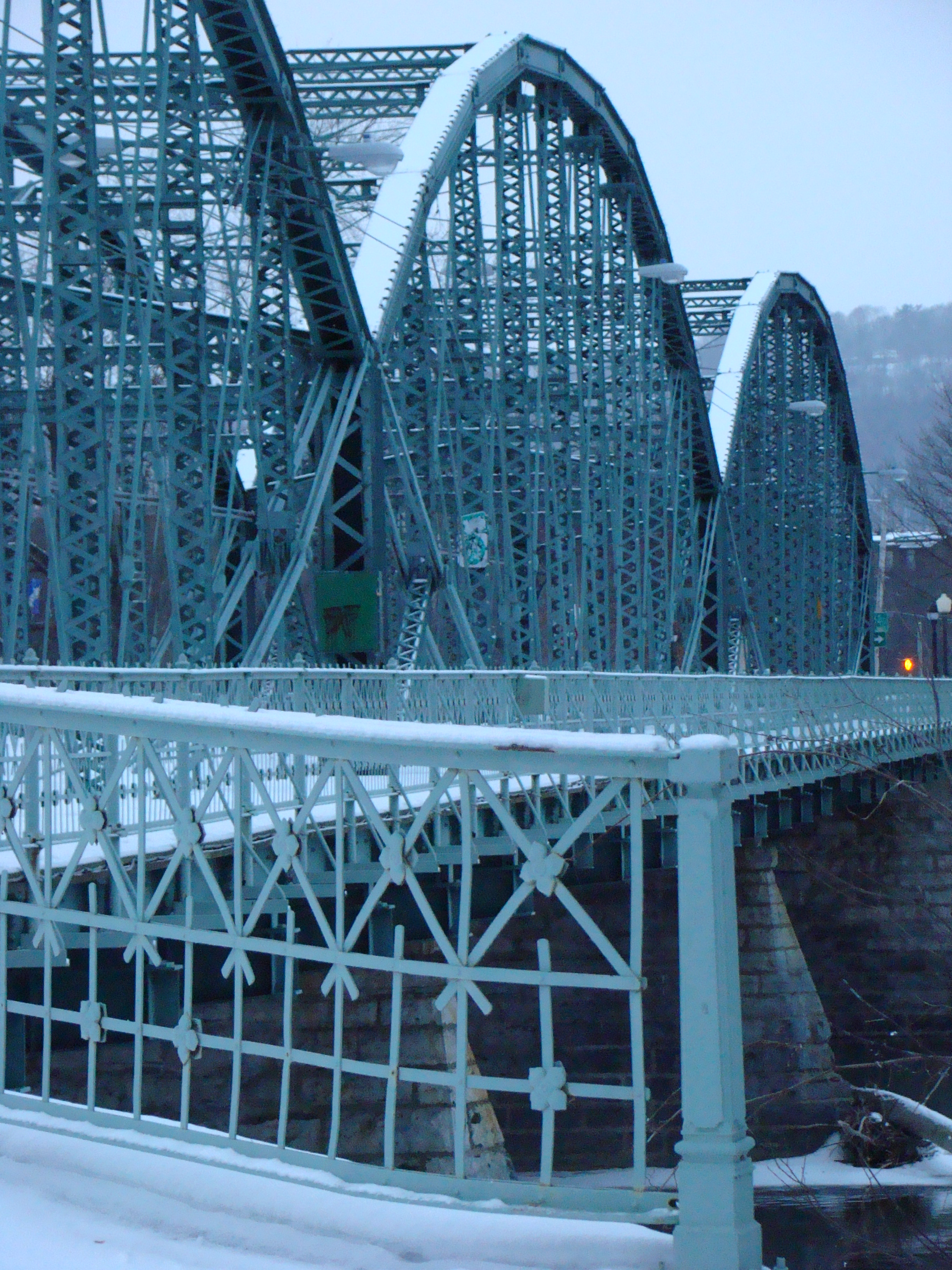
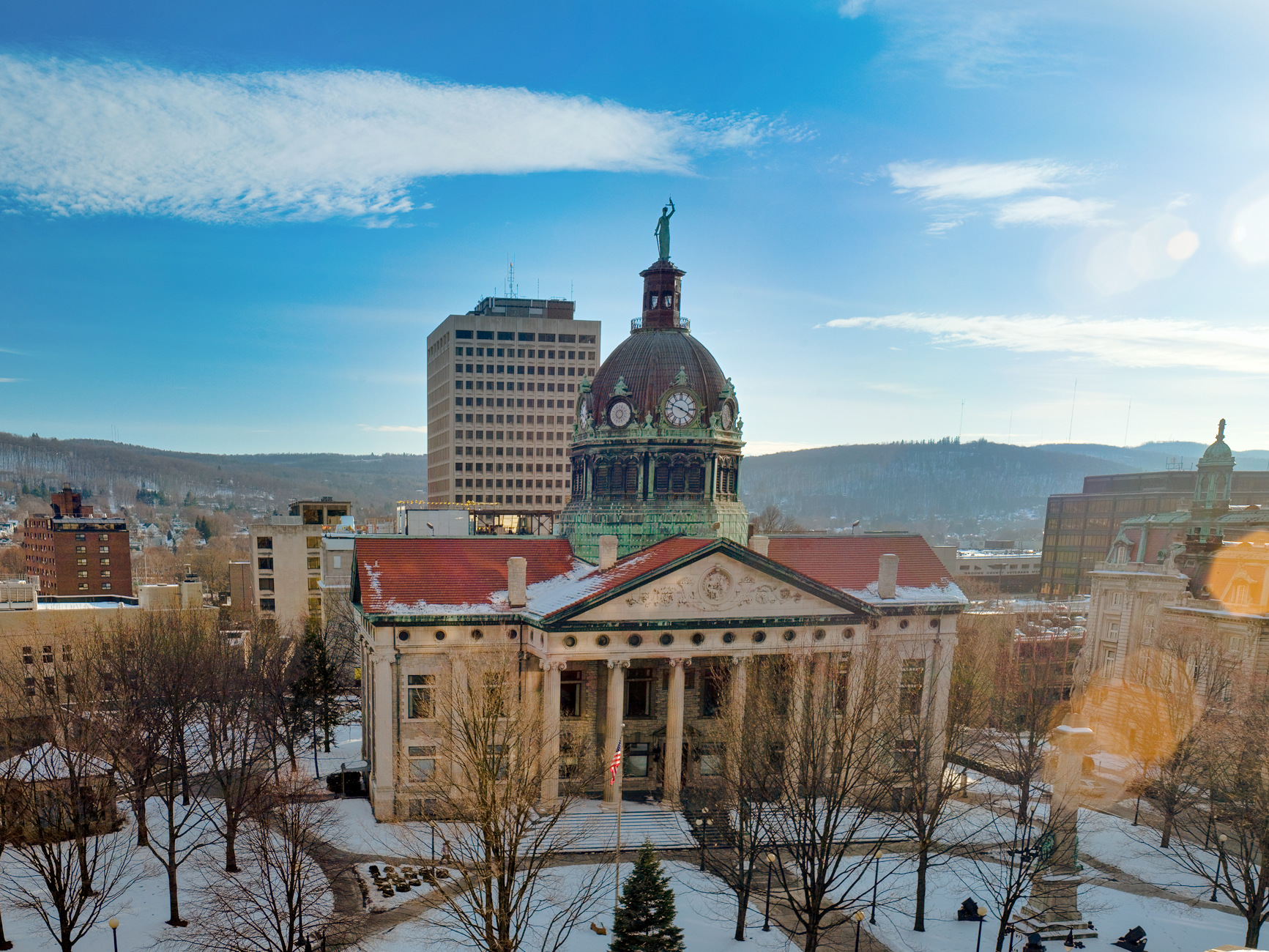
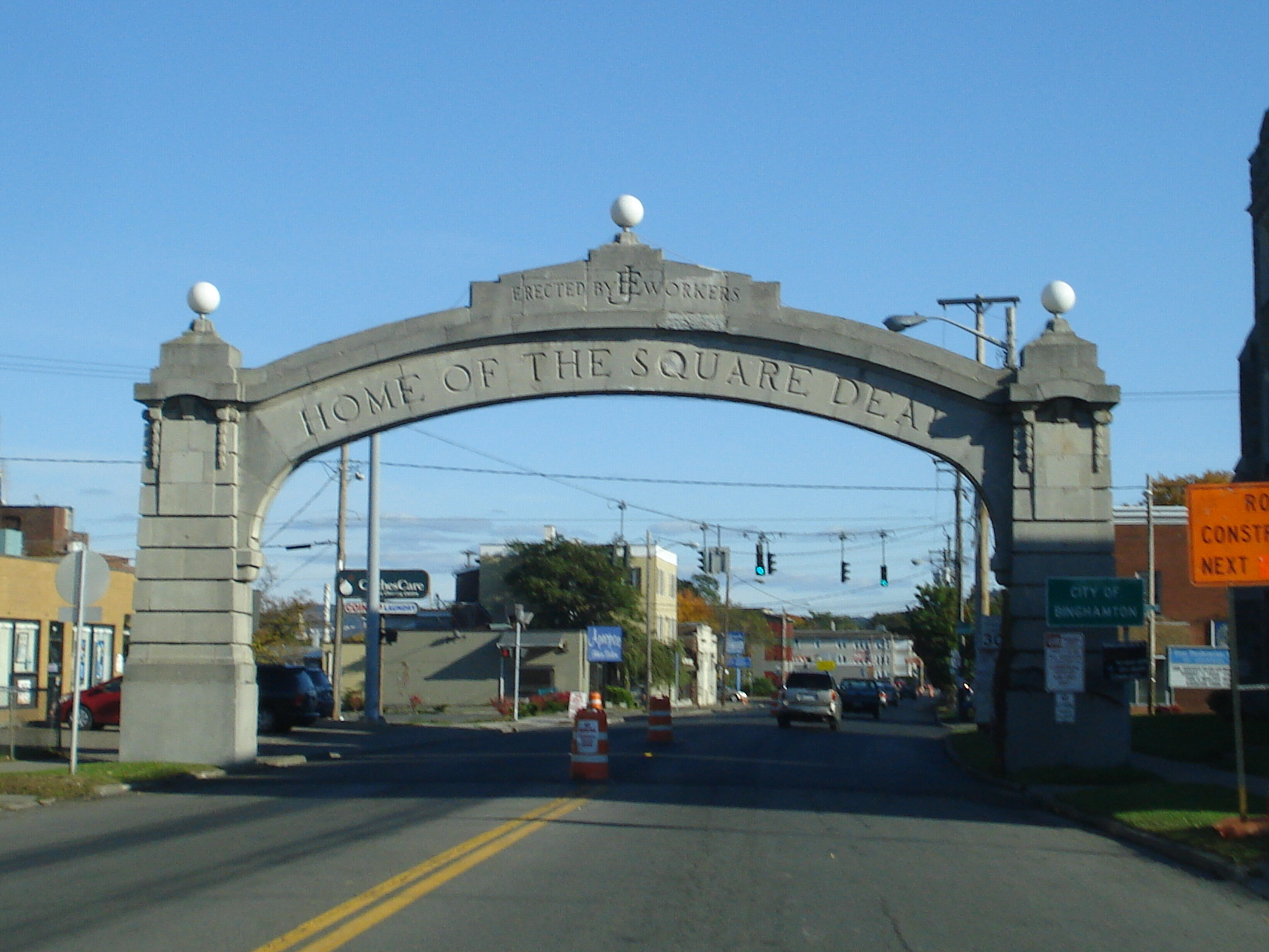
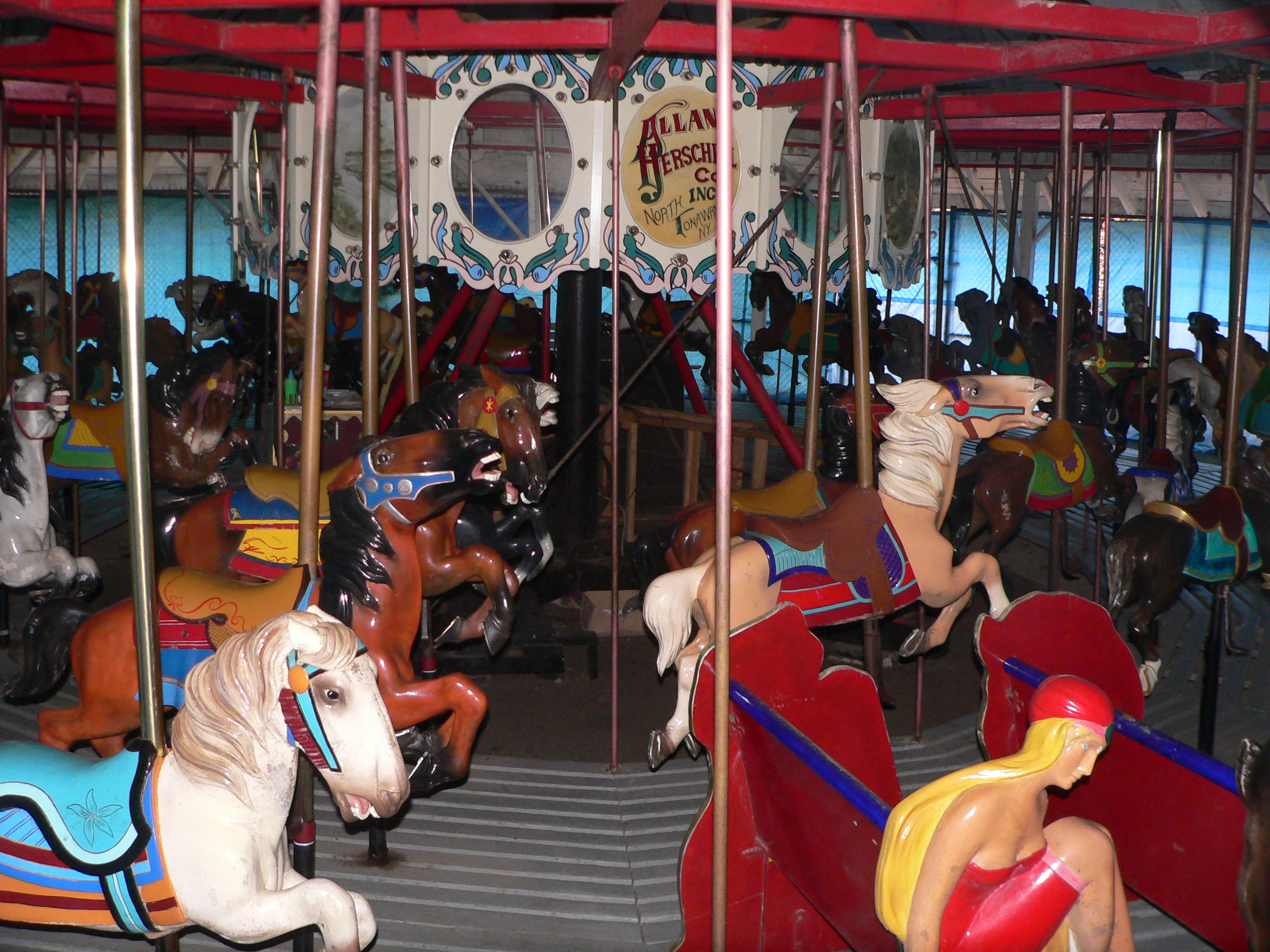
- Cityscape of Binghamton Washington Street Bridge Broome County Courthouse Square Deal Arch Ross Park Carousel

- Seal
- Nicknames: The Parlor City, Carousel Capital of the World, Valley of Opportunity
- Location within New York Location within the United States
- Coordinates: 42°05′56″N 75°54′39″W
- Country: United States
- State: New York
- County: Broome
- Settled: 1800; 226 years ago
- Incorporated (village): 1834; 192 years ago
- Incorporated (city): 1867; 159 years ago

Government
  - Type: Mayor–council
  - Mayor: Jared M. Kraham (R)

Area
  - City: 11.13 sq mi (28.82 km^{2})
  - Land: 10.48 sq mi (27.14 km^{2})
  - Water: 0.65 sq mi (1.68 km^{2}) 5.83%
- Elevation: 866 ft (264 m)

Population (2020)
  - City: 47,969
  - Density: 4,577.5/sq mi (1,767.39/km^{2})
  - Urban: 158,084
  - Metro: 247,138
- Demonym: Binghamtonian
- Time zone: UTC−5 (EST)
  - Summer (DST): UTC−4 (EDT)
- ZIP code: 139xx (13901 = downtown)
- Area code: 607
- FIPS code: 36-06607
- GNIS feature ID: 978733
- Website: binghamton-ny.gov

Binghamton (/ˈbɪŋəmtən/ BING-əm-tən) is a city in the U.S. state of New York, and serves as the county seat of Broome County. Surrounded by rolling hills, it lies in the state's Southern Tier region near the Pennsylvania border, in a bowl-shaped valley at the confluence of the Susquehanna and Chenango rivers. The population was 47,969 at the 2020 census. Binghamton is the principal city of the Binghamton metropolitan area (also known as Greater Binghamton, or historically the Triple Cities, including Endicott and Johnson City), home to a quarter million people.

From the days of the railroad, Binghamton was a transportation crossroads and a manufacturing center, and has been known at different times for the production of cigars, shoes, and computers. IBM was founded nearby, and the flight simulator was invented in the city, leading to a notable concentration of electronics- and defense-oriented firms. This sustained economic prosperity earned Binghamton the moniker of the Valley of Opportunity. However, starting with job cuts made by defense firms towards the end of the Cold War, the region lost a large part of its manufacturing industry.

Today, some of Binghamton's largest job sectors are education and healthcare. Community officials are hopeful that there will be manufacturing sector growth as semiconductor companies expand to central New York.

== History ==
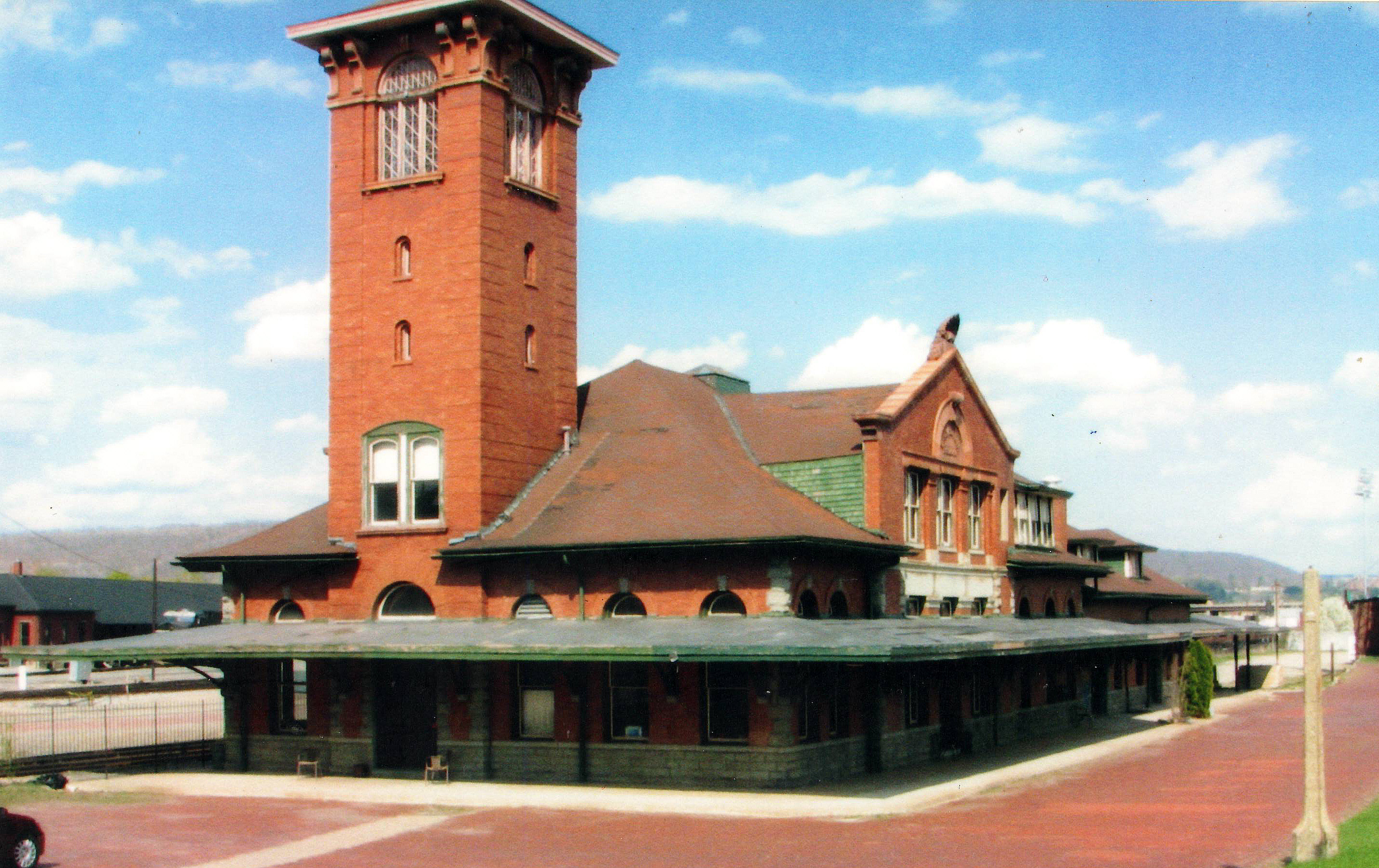
Former DL&W Station, part of the Railroad Terminal Historic District

=== Early settlement ===
The first known people of European descent to come to the area were the troops of the Sullivan Expedition in 1779, during the American Revolutionary War, who destroyed local villages of the Onondaga and Oneida tribes. The city was named after William Bingham, a wealthy Philadelphian who bought the 10,000 acre patent for the land in 1786, then consisting of parts of the towns of Union and Chenango. Joshua Whitney Jr., Bingham's land agent, chose land at the junction of the Chenango and Susquehanna Rivers to develop a settlement, then named Chenango Point. After being officially conveyed the land by Bingham on July 4, 1800, Whitney arranged for the construction of the settlement's first two streets, Court Street and Water Street, and the first residence was built later that year.

Whitney continued to expand Chenango Point and sell plots to new settlers, and helped erect the first bridge in 1808. Around this time, locals started informally referring to the settlement as Binghamton in honor of Bingham's generosity as a benefactor. The settlement's significant growth led to its incorporation as a village, and its official renaming as Binghamton, in 1813. However, this initial effort at incorporating a village government, along with a reorganization in 1824, failed to take hold, and a permanent government was not established until a third village incorporation act passed on May 3, 1834. Daniel S. Dickinson was chosen to be the first village president.

Perspective map of Binghamton from 1882 published by L.R. Burleigh

The Chenango Canal, completed in 1837, connected Binghamton to the Erie Canal, and was the impetus for the initial industrial development of the area. This growth accelerated with the completion of the Erie Railroad between Binghamton and Jersey City, NJ in 1849. With the Delaware, Lackawanna and Western Railroad arriving soon afterward, the village became an important regional transportation center. Several buildings of importance were built at this time, including the New York State Inebriate Asylum, opened in 1858 as the first center in the United States to treat alcoholism as a disease.

=== Growth as a manufacturing hub ===
Binghamton incorporated as a city in 1867 and, due to the presence of several stately homes, was nicknamed the Parlor City. In the late 19th and early 20th centuries, many immigrants moved to the area, finding an abundance of jobs. During the 1880s, Binghamton became the second-largest manufacturer of cigars in the United States. By the early 1920s, Endicott Johnson, a shoe manufacturer whose development of welfare capitalism resulted in many amenities for local residents, became the region's largest employer. An even larger influx of Europeans immigrated to Binghamton, and the working class prosperity resulted in the area being called the Valley of Opportunity.

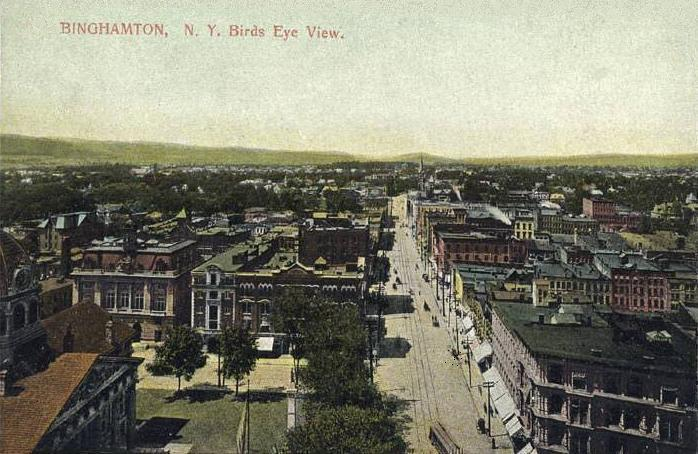
Court Street, c. 1910

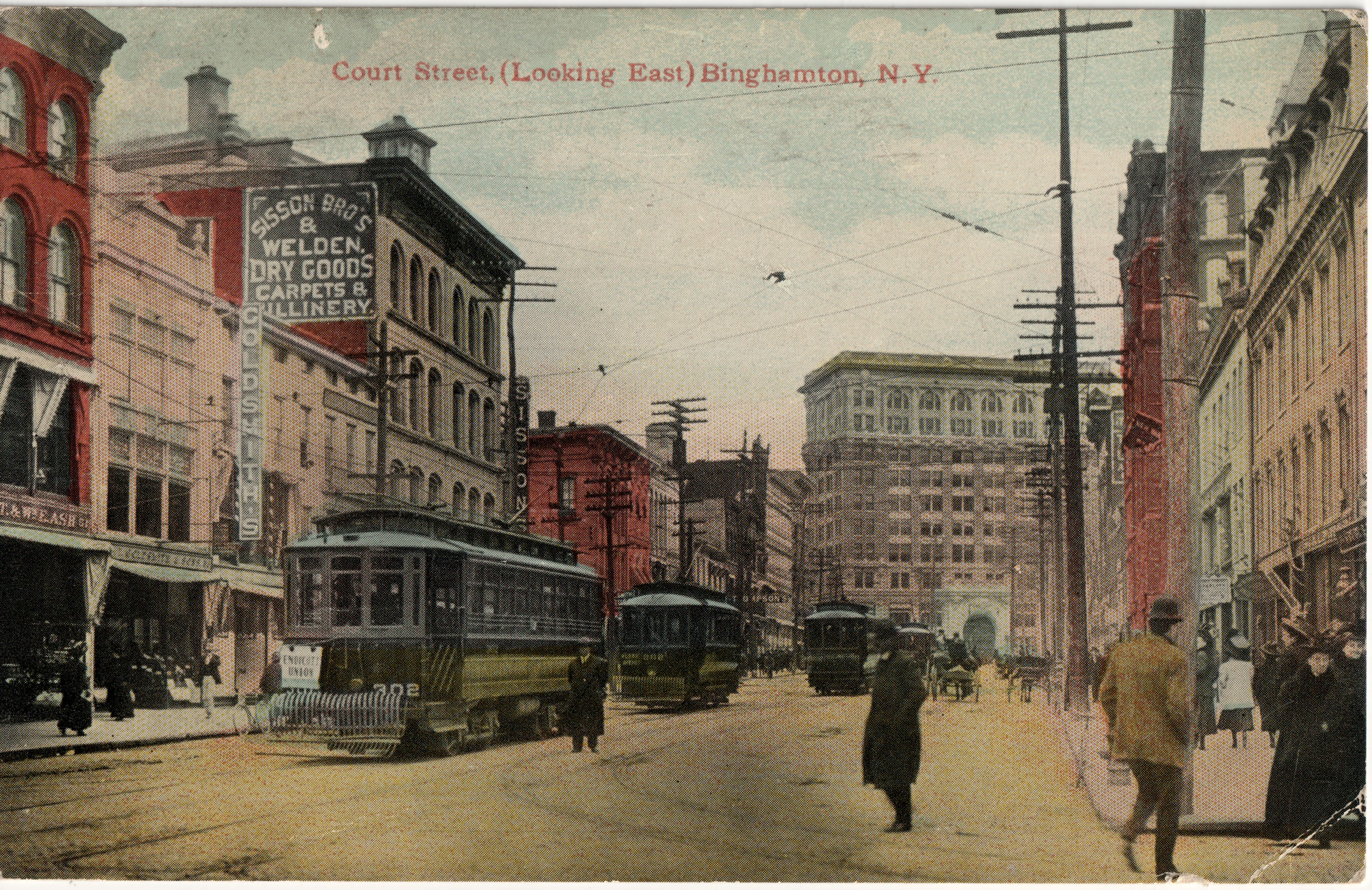
Court Street in Binghamton, NY looking East, 1912

In 1913, 31 people perished in the Binghamton Clothing Company fire, which resulted in reforms to the New York fire code. Major floods in 1935 and 1936 resulted in a number of deaths and washed out the Ferry Street Bridge (now the Clinton Street Bridge). The floods led the city to build flood walls along the length of the Susquehanna and Chenango Rivers.

During the Second World War, growth continued as IBM, which was founded in greater Binghamton, emerged as a global technology leader. Along with Edwin Link's invention of the flight simulator in Binghamton, IBM's growth helped transition the region to a high-tech economy. Other major manufacturers included Ansco and General Electric. Until the Cold War ended, the area never experienced an economic downfall, due in part to its defense-oriented industries. The city's population peaked at around 85,000 in the mid-1950s.

=== Decline and recovery ===
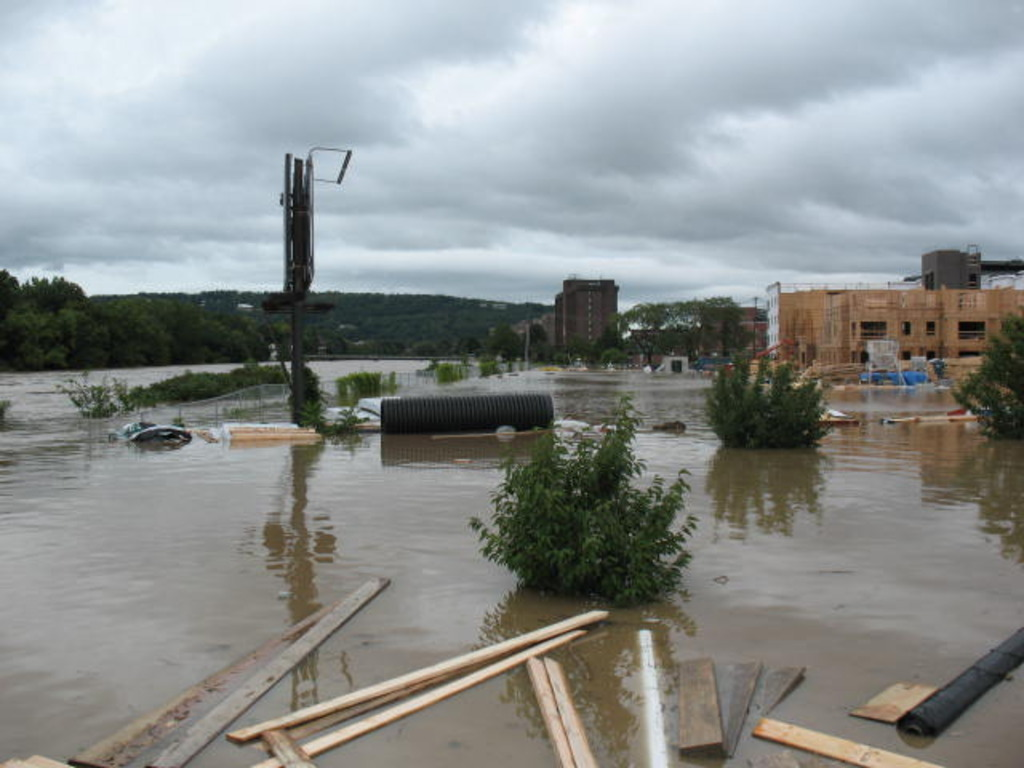
Flooding in 2011 due to the remnants of Tropical Storm Lee

Post-war suburban development led to a decline in the city's population and the rapid growth of the towns of Vestal and Union. Like many other Rust Belt cities, traditional manufacturers saw steep declines, though Binghamton's technology industry limited this impact. Urban renewal efforts to reverse these trends dominated construction in the city during the 1960s and early 1970s and led to the destruction of many ornate city buildings. The construction included the creation of Government Plaza, the Broome County Veterans Memorial Arena, and the Brandywine Highway. While these projects failed to stem most of the losses, they established Binghamton as the region's government and cultural center. The city's population declined from approximately 64,000 in 1969 to 56,000 by the early 1980s.

As the Cold War ended in 1991 with the collapse of the Soviet Union, defense-related industries in the Binghamton area began to falter, resulting in several closures and widespread layoffs. These were most notable at IBM, which sold its Federal Systems division and laid off several thousands of workers. The local economy went into a deep recession, and the long-prevalent manufacturing jobs dropped by 64% from 1990 to 2013.

In the 21st century, the city has tried to diversify its economic base to spur revitalization. The local economy has slowly transitioned toward services and healthcare. Major emphasis has been placed on Binghamton University, which built a downtown campus in 2007 and several student housing complexes. The increased downtown residential population and the university's plans to build additional student housing have spurred development of supporting businesses and a renewed focus on the riverfront. Unfortunately, two severe floods have stymied the recovery: while most of the impact of the Mid-Atlantic United States flood of 2006 was in the surrounding metropolitan area, the remnants of Tropical Storm Lee topped city flood walls in September 2011, causing $1 billion of damage in greater Binghamton.

On April 3, 2009, the deadliest mass shooting in New York history occurred at the American Civic Association's offices in Binghamton.

== Geography ==
=== Cityscape ===
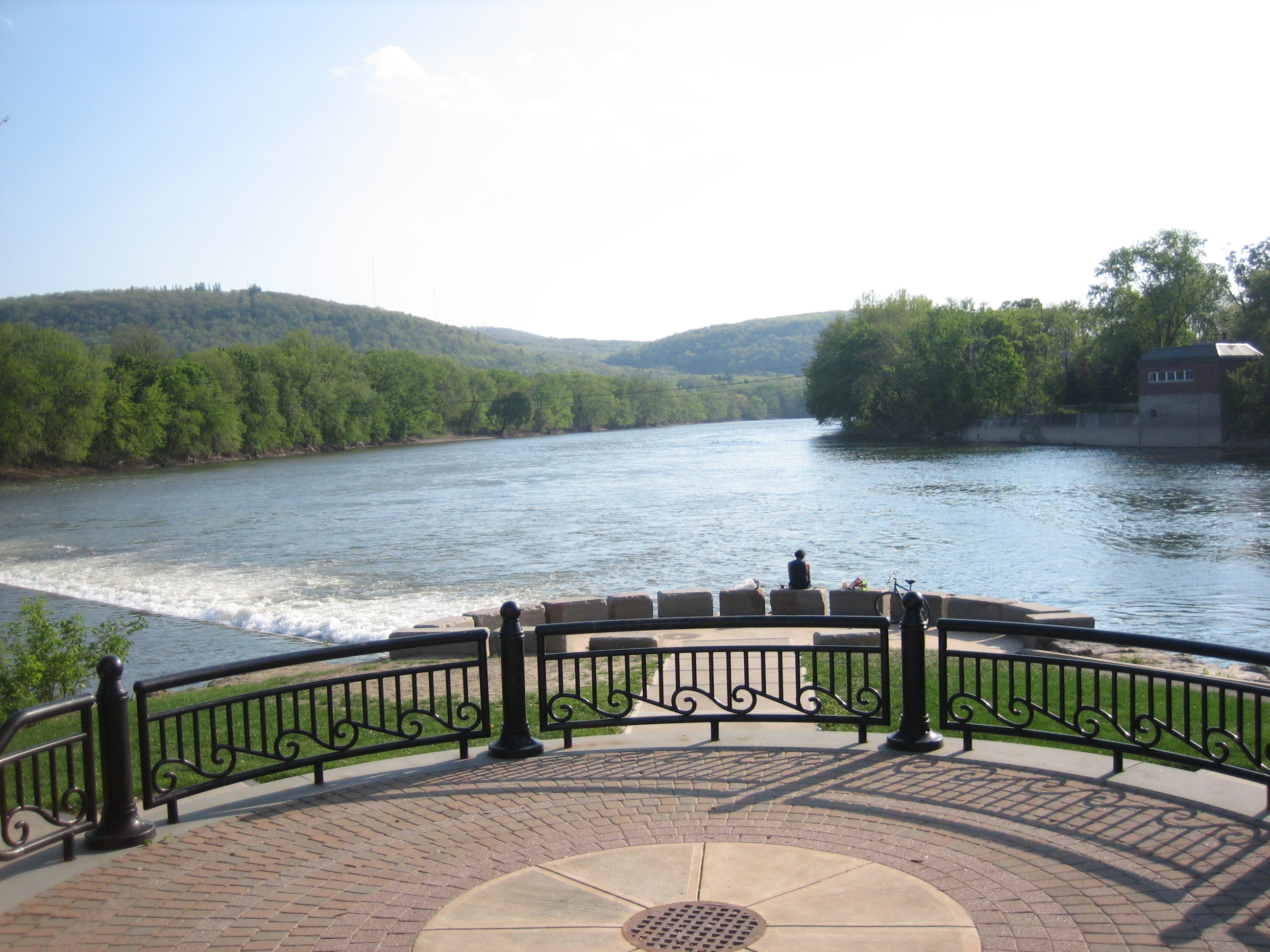
Confluence Park, facing west toward the confluence of the Susquehanna (left) and Chenango (right) rivers

According to the U.S. Census Bureau, the city has an area of 11.14 square miles (28.9 km^{2}), of which 10.49 square miles (27.2 km^{2}) is land and 0.65 square miles (1.7 km^{2}) (5.83%) is water.

Binghamton, like all of the Southern Tier of New York, lies on the Allegheny Plateau; hence its hilly terrain. As such, elevations can vary in the city--Downtown, for example, is at an elevation of around 860 feet (262 meters), while residential homes in the hills can go up to over 1,800 feet (548 meters), such as on Ingram Hill. The highest peak in Binghamton is Table Rock Ridge, which is at 1,854 feet.

The Downtown area sits at the confluence of the Chenango and Susquehanna Rivers, in the middle of a long but relatively narrow valley. The north branch of the Susquehanna River passes south of downtown. This branch rises in eastern New York and receives a number of tributaries above Binghamton. In the center of the city, the Chenango River feeds into the Susquehanna from the north at Confluence Park. The Binghamton River Trail, a 1.5 mile trail along the Chenango, runs between Cheri Lindsey Park on the Northside and Confluence Park in Downtown. Eleven bridges span the rivers inside city limits. Broome County has 17.5 miles of levees, many of which are in Binghamton. Major floods have occurred in 1865, 1935, 1936, 2006, and 2011.

The incorporation of Binghamton united various communities on both shores of the two rivers. The majority of the city's population and development lies along the rolling terrain nearest the riverbanks with sparse development in the hills that define the city limits. The old city was laid out on a grid system by Joshua Whitney Jr., but as development spread to the outer regions of the city and merged with other settlements, several grids were eventually juxtaposed against each other. In the Southside, the grid breaks down, as more curvilinear roads make up the predominantly residential areas along the hills.

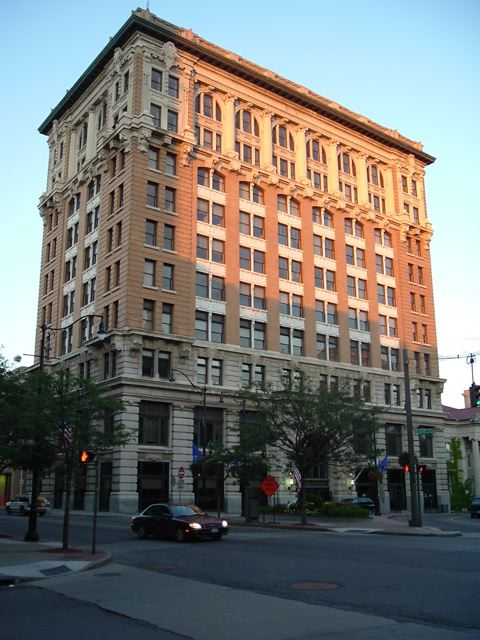
The Beaux-Arts Security Mutual Life Building (1905)

The city was the traditional economic center of the region and is home to several historic districts. The Railroad Terminal Historic District consists of several factories and buildings along the railroad line in the northern limits of downtown. Over 1,000 properties on the West Side contribute to the Abel Bennett Tract Historic District, mainly made up of residential properties along Riverside Drive. Downtown's State Street-Henry Street Historic District consists of several older low-rise buildings. The Court Street Historic District has some of the city's most notable architecture, including the Press Building and Security Mutual Building, early 20th century high rises, and the Broome County Courthouse. The Press Building was the tallest building in Binghamton until the completion of the State Office Building in Government Plaza, which remains the tallest in the city.

Away from downtown, most of the buildings are single- and multi-family dwellings, along with low-rise business buildings lining commercial arteries. Along the railroad corridors, several factories, mostly abandoned, rise above the otherwise-uniform landscape.

Main Street runs through the West Side, and continues west to serve as Main Street in the villages of Johnson City and Endicott. On the east side of the Chenango River, the road becomes Court Street, the major east–west artery in downtown and the East Side.

=== Neighborhoods ===
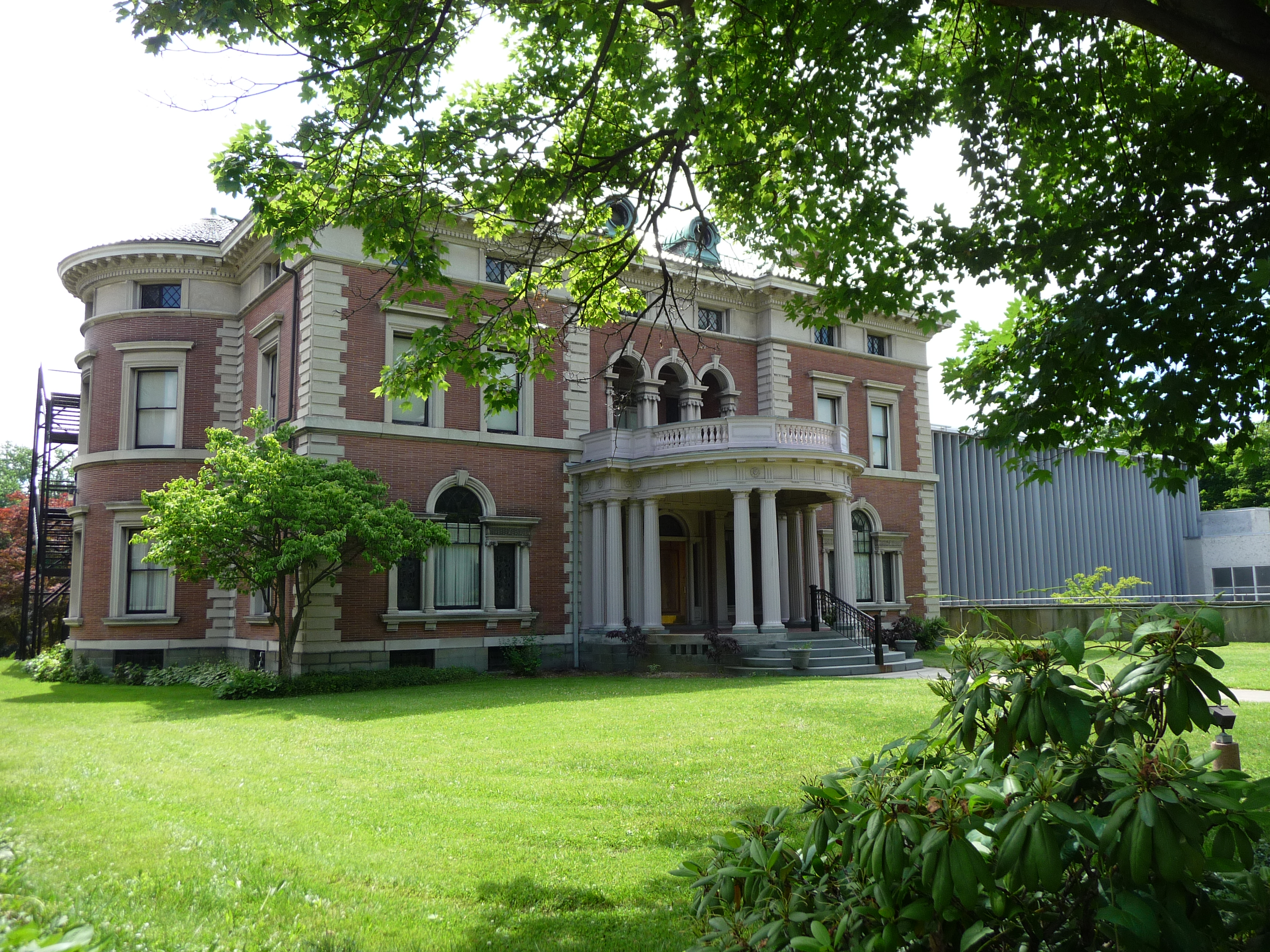
Roberson Mansion

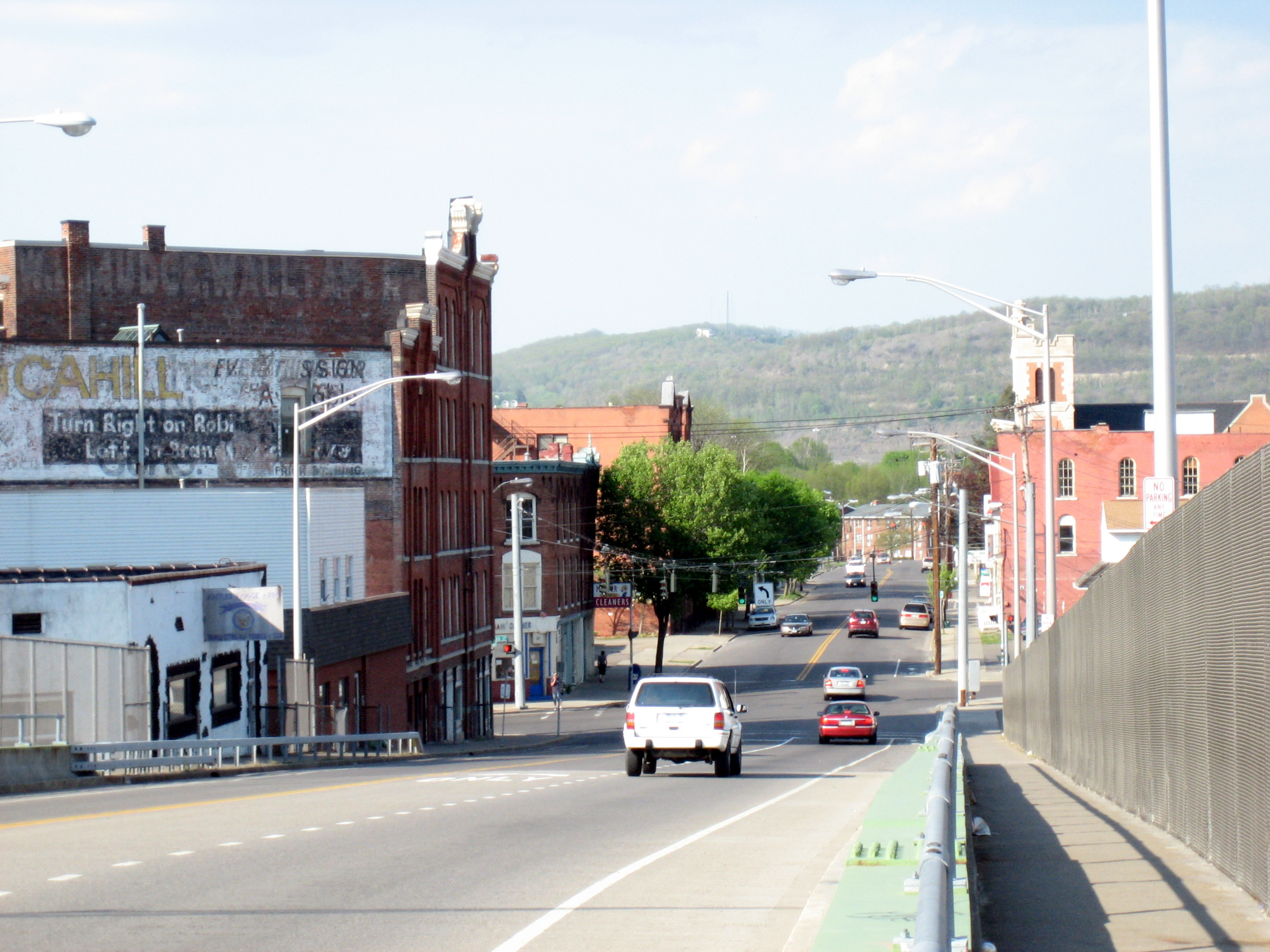
North Side, along Chenango Street

Binghamton is divided into seven neighborhoods. Downtown Binghamton, also known as Center City, is home to most of the city's largest buildings and government services. Located at the northeast corner of the river confluence and increasingly populated by college students, it supports a flourishing arts scene. The North Side is across the Norfolk Southern rail tracks from downtown, along the Chenango River. The North Side is a light commercial and working-class residential area of the city, with Chenango Street serving as its major artery. The East Side lies east of the Brandywine Highway, along the north bank of the Susquehanna River. The neighborhood is largely residential with commercial corridors along Robinson and Court streets, and it has pockets of industrial development along its borders.

Across the Chenango River lies the West Side, a primarily residential neighborhood along the banks of the Susquehanna that has a combination of family homes, student housing, and stately mansions. Main Street's large supermarkets, pharmacies, bank branches, pubs, restaurants, auto shops, and a few strip malls form the West Side's commercial corridor. The First Ward, a largely residential neighborhood opposite the railroad tracks from the West Side, is best known for Antique Row, a series of antique shops that line Clinton Street. This part of the city is home to several gold-domed Christian churches built by the area's many Eastern European immigrants. It is also home to several large supermarkets, churches, pharmacies, bank branches, a few bars and restaurants as well as mom and pop shops that provide such goods as video games and music. Ely Park, Binghamton's northernmost neighborhood, contains its municipal golf course. It lies on parts of Prospect Mountain and other hills north of the First Ward.

The Southside lies along the south bank of the Susquehanna River and is connected to downtown by several bridges. At the base of the historic South Washington Street Bridge is the Southbridge commercial district. The neighborhood is partitioned into two neighborhood assemblies, divided by Pennsylvania Avenue and Southbridge, due to their distinct characters. Southside East has working-class residences and some public housing projects and is home to the Islamic Awareness Center, while Southside West is primarily made up of larger middle-class residences.

=== Climate ===
Binghamton, New York

Climate chart (precipitation, max. and min. temperature)
J	F	M	A	M	J	J	A	S	O	N	D
2.5 29 16	2.3 32 17	3 41 25	3.4 54 36	3.6 66 46	4.3 74 55	3.7 78 60	3.5 77 58	3.6 68 51	3.3 57 40	3.3 45 31	2.8 33 21
- █ Average max. and min. temperatures in °F
- █ Precipitation totals in inches
Metric conversion
J	F	M	A	M	J	J	A	S	O	N	D
62 −2 −9	59 0 −8	76 5 −4	87 12 2	91 19 8	109 23 13	94 25 15	88 25 15	92 20 10	85 14 5	84 7 0	72 1 −6
- █ Average max. and min. temperatures in °C
- █ Precipitation totals in mm

Binghamton has a humid continental climate (Köppen Dfb), with cold, snowy winters and warm, wet summers. Summers in Binghamton are typified by warm yet temperate days, and there are an average of only 2.6 days annually where the high exceeds 90 °F (32 °C), with the highest recorded temperature at 98 °F (37 °C) on July 16, 1988. Winters are less moderate, with 5.8 days with sub-0 °F (−18 °C) lows annually on average; the lowest recorded temperature was −20 °F (−29 °C) on January 15, 1957. As with most cities in upstate New York, precipitation in Binghamton is spread evenly throughout the year.

Binghamton's proximity to the Great Lakes results in significant cloudiness and precipitation. Weather systems traveling over the lakes pick up moisture. Like other cities near the Great Lakes, Binghamton has a large number of days with cloud cover and at least some precipitation. Binghamton has 190 cloudy or mostly cloudy days per year, which is the 11th most among US cities. Cloudiness is most common during winter, with mostly cloudy or overcast skies 37% of the time in August but 68% of the time in January. While average annual precipitation is 42 inches (107 cm), which is typical for the eastern half of the United States, Binghamton averages 164 days of measurable (at least .01 inches) precipitation, which is among the highest in the country.

Snowfall is significant, with an annual total of 86.5 inches (220 cm). Binghamton is not as affected by lake-effect snow as cities further north or west such as Syracuse and Buffalo, which are part of the Great Lakes snowbelt. However, persistent snow bands from both the Great Lakes and the Finger Lakes can reach Binghamton. Binghamton receives occasional major snowfall from nor'easter storms as well (such as the 1993 Storm of the Century, or nearly four feet of snow in December 2020), and competes for the Golden Snowball Award with other upstate cities.

Climate data for Binghamton, New York (Greater Binghamton Airport; elevation 1636 feet), 1991–2020 normals, (Note: Mean monthly maxima and minima (i.e. the expected highest and lowest temperature readings at any point during the year or given month) calculated based on data at said location from 1991 to 2020.) extremes 1951–present (Note: Official records for Binghamton were kept exclusively at the airport since 25 May 1951.)
Month	Jan	Feb	Mar	Apr	May	Jun	Jul	Aug	Sep	Oct	Nov	Dec	Year
Record high °F (°C)	63 (17)	70 (21)	82 (28)	89 (32)	89 (32)	94 (34)	98 (37)	95 (35)	96 (36)	85 (29)	77 (25)	65 (18)	98 (37)
Mean maximum °F (°C)	53.2 (11.8)	52.2 (11.2)	62.9 (17.2)	76.7 (24.8)	83.8 (28.8)	86.7 (30.4)	88.6 (31.4)	86.9 (30.5)	83.9 (28.8)	75.0 (23.9)	65.1 (18.4)	54.6 (12.6)	90.4 (32.4)
Mean daily maximum °F (°C)	29.5 (−1.4)	32.2 (0.1)	40.7 (4.8)	54.2 (12.3)	66.2 (19.0)	74.0 (23.3)	78.4 (25.8)	76.7 (24.8)	69.5 (20.8)	57.1 (13.9)	45.1 (7.3)	34.3 (1.3)	54.8 (12.7)
Daily mean °F (°C)	22.5 (−5.3)	24.5 (−4.2)	32.3 (0.2)	44.6 (7.0)	56.2 (13.4)	64.4 (18.0)	68.9 (20.5)	67.3 (19.6)	60.0 (15.6)	48.8 (9.3)	37.9 (3.3)	28.1 (−2.2)	46.3 (7.9)
Mean daily minimum °F (°C)	15.5 (−9.2)	16.9 (−8.4)	24.0 (−4.4)	35.0 (1.7)	46.1 (7.8)	54.9 (12.7)	59.4 (15.2)	58.0 (14.4)	50.6 (10.3)	40.5 (4.7)	30.7 (−0.7)	21.9 (−5.6)	37.8 (3.2)
Mean minimum °F (°C)	−3.6 (−19.8)	−0.7 (−18.2)	6.7 (−14.1)	21.9 (−5.6)	33.2 (0.7)	42.3 (5.7)	50.5 (10.3)	47.9 (8.8)	36.1 (2.3)	28.2 (−2.1)	16.2 (−8.8)	4.7 (−15.2)	−6 (−21)
Record low °F (°C)	−20 (−29)	−18 (−28)	−7 (−22)	9 (−13)	24 (−4)	33 (1)	39 (4)	37 (3)	25 (−4)	17 (−8)	0 (−18)	−18 (−28)	−20 (−29)
Average precipitation inches (mm)	2.62 (67)	2.41 (61)	3.05 (77)	3.63 (92)	3.78 (96)	4.69 (119)	3.80 (97)	4.10 (104)	4.01 (102)	3.76 (96)	3.11 (79)	3.08 (78)	42.04 (1,068)
Average snowfall inches (cm)	20.6 (52)	19.7 (50)	16.4 (42)	3.8 (9.7)	0.1 (0.25)	0.0 (0.0)	0.0 (0.0)	0.0 (0.0)	0.0 (0.0)	1.0 (2.5)	6.8 (17)	18.1 (46)	86.5 (220)
Average extreme snow depth inches (cm)	9.5 (24)	10.4 (26)	9.8 (25)	2.0 (5.1)	0.1 (0.25)	0.0 (0.0)	0.0 (0.0)	0.0 (0.0)	0.0 (0.0)	0.4 (1.0)	3.4 (8.6)	7.6 (19)	16.2 (41)
Average precipitation days (≥ 0.01 in)	16.2	13.9	14.8	14.1	14.2	12.4	12.6	11.1	11.3	13.3	13.9	16.3	164.1
Average snowy days (≥ 0.1 in)	16.5	14.0	10.5	3.6	0.2	0.0	0.0	0.0	0.0	0.9	5.9	12.9	64.5
Average relative humidity (%)	74.0	72.4	69.3	64.9	67.0	72.0	72.0	75.4	78.1	73.8	76.4	78.4	72.8
Average dew point °F (°C)	13.8 (−10.1)	14.7 (−9.6)	22.6 (−5.2)	31.5 (−0.3)	43.5 (6.4)	54.0 (12.2)	58.5 (14.7)	57.9 (14.4)	51.8 (11.0)	39.9 (4.4)	30.7 (−0.7)	20.3 (−6.5)	36.6 (2.6)
Mean monthly sunshine hours	113.0	125.9	172.5	205.1	252.4	274.6	295.3	256.8	202.0	162.5	92.9	79.7	2,232.7
Percentage possible sunshine	38	43	47	51	56	60	64	60	54	47	32	28	50
Source: NOAA (relative humidity, dew point, and sun 1961–1990)

== Demographics ==
Historical population
Census	Pop.	Note	%±
1830	1,203		—
1840	2,800		132.8%
1850	6,000		114.3%
1860	8,325		38.8%
1870	12,692		52.5%
1880	17,317		36.4%
1890	35,005		102.1%
1900	39,647		13.3%
1910	48,443		22.2%
1920	66,800		37.9%
1930	76,662		14.8%
1940	78,309		2.1%
1950	80,674		3.0%
1960	75,941		−5.9%
1970	64,123		−15.6%
1980	55,860		−12.9%
1990	53,008		−5.1%
2000	47,380		−10.6%
2010	47,376		0.0%
2020	47,969		1.3%
Historical Population Figures

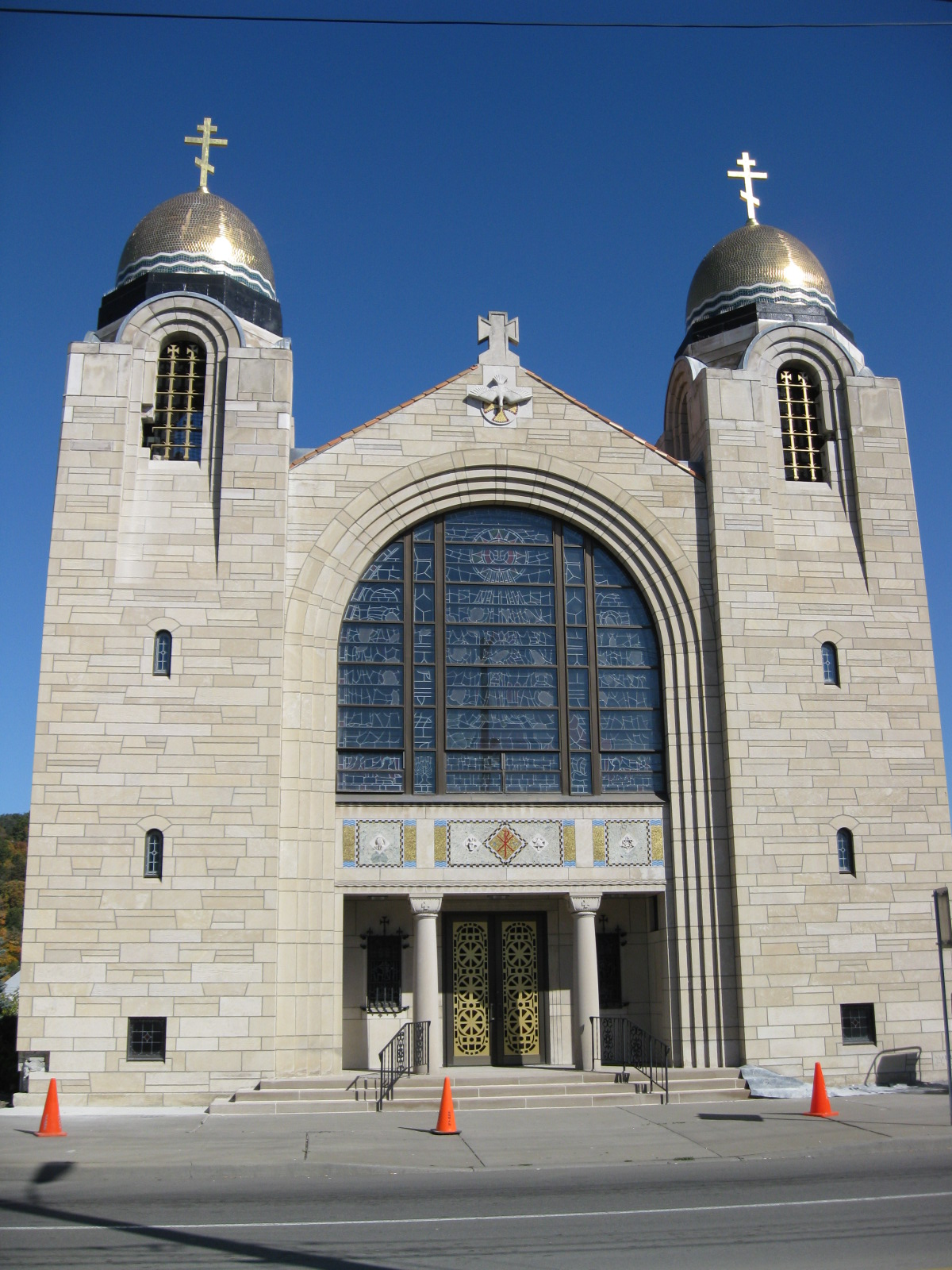
Holy Spirit Byzantine Catholic Church in the First Ward.

=== Racial and ethnic composition ===
Binghamton is home to an ethnically diverse population. During its industrial heyday, thousands of European immigrants moved to the city as they found an abundance of jobs and working-class prosperity. Many Irish, Italians, and Eastern Europeans settled in the area, and the American Civic Association was created to help their transition to life and assimilation in the United States. This influx led to a temporary rise in the local Ku Klux Klan during the 1920s, with Binghamton serving as state headquarters. Area residents, who primarily embraced the different cultural heritages, quelled such anti-immigrant sentiment by founding several ethnic organizations and holding ethnic celebrations, at the encouragement of Endicott-Johnson.

This has had a lasting effect on the city, which sports many churches and contemporary ethnic festivals, along with a population that is still predominantly white (though steadily decreasing in proportion). Binghamton also has a sizeable Kurdish community, among the largest in New York, mostly originating from Iraqi Kurdistan.

=== Religion ===
Due to its diversity, the region is home to many religious denominations. The First Ward, the historic home to much of the city's Eastern European population, houses several gold domed Orthodox churches. As a result of its strong Italian and Irish heritage, the largest religious body in Broome County is the Catholic Church. Binghamton falls under the Roman Catholic Diocese of Syracuse. Throughout the county, 105,064 people, or 52.4% of the total population, are listed as congregational adherents.

=== 2020 census ===
As of the 2020 census, Binghamton had a population of 47,969. The median age was 36.0 years. 18.0% of residents were under the age of 18 and 18.0% of residents were 65 years of age or older. For every 100 females there were 96.0 males, and for every 100 females age 18 and over there were 93.4 males age 18 and over.

100.0% of residents lived in urban areas, while 0.0% lived in rural areas.

There were 21,639 households in Binghamton, of which 20.9% had children under the age of 18 living in them. Of all households, 23.1% were married-couple households, 29.5% were households with a male householder and no spouse or partner present, and 38.1% were households with a female householder and no spouse or partner present. About 42.8% of all households were made up of individuals and 14.8% had someone living alone who was 65 years of age or older.

There were 24,969 housing units, of which 13.3% were vacant. The homeowner vacancy rate was 2.6% and the rental vacancy rate was 9.0%.

Racial composition as of the 2020 census
Race	Number	Percent
White	32,050	66.8%
Black or African American	7,065	14.7%
American Indian and Alaska Native	226	0.5%
Asian	2,859	6.0%
Native Hawaiian and Other Pacific Islander	19	0.0%
Some other race	1,344	2.8%
Two or more races	4,406	9.2%
Hispanic or Latino (of any race)	4,155	8.7%

=== 2010 census ===
As of the 2010 census, 47,376 people, 21,150 households, and 9,986 families resided in the city. The population density was 4,516.8 inhabitants per square mile (1,743.9/km^{2}). There were 23,842 housing units at an average density of 2,273.1 per square mile (877.6/km^{2}). Of all households, 20.8% had children under the age of 18 living with them, 26.9% were married couples living together, 15.6% had a female householder with no husband present, 4.7% had a male householder with no wife present, and 52.8% were non-families. 40.5% of all households were made up of individuals, and 25.5% had someone living alone who was 65 years of age or older. The average household size was 2.18 and the average family size was 2.94.

As of 2010, Binghamton's racial makeup was 77.6% White, 11.4% Black or African American, 0.3% Native American, 4.2% Asian, 0.04% Pacific Islander, 2.0% from other races, and 4.4% from two or more races. 6.4% of the population were Hispanic or Latino of any race.

=== Population trends ===
Until the mid-1950s, Binghamton saw its population grow rapidly due to its industrial boom, and it was one of the largest 100 cities in the United States between 1890 and 1910. Since 1950, the city has experienced sustained population loss, some of which was the result of suburbanization. Much of the recent population loss has occurred throughout the region, and is skewed toward the younger population, resulting in the growth of the relative proportion of the elderly in Broome County.

=== Metropolitan area ===
As of 2020, the Binghamton metropolitan area is home to 247,138 people. The MSA is composed of all of Broome County and neighboring Tioga County. The urban area, which includes parts of Susquehanna County, Pennsylvania, has a population of 158,054 as of 2010. Alternatively defined, the number of people living in an approximately 30-mile radius of the city center is 316,270. This count includes Broome County and parts of Tioga, Cortland, Delaware, Chenango, and Tompkins Counties in New York, and parts of Susquehanna, Bradford, and Wayne Counties in Pennsylvania.

=== Income and poverty ===
The city's median household income was $30,978, and the median family income was $43,436. Males had a median full-time income of $40,170 versus $35,060 for females. The city's per capita income was $20,576. About 23.6% of families and 33.3% of the population were below the poverty line, including 47.3% of those under age 18 and 14.9% of those age 65 or over.

== Economy ==
Endicott Johnson factory

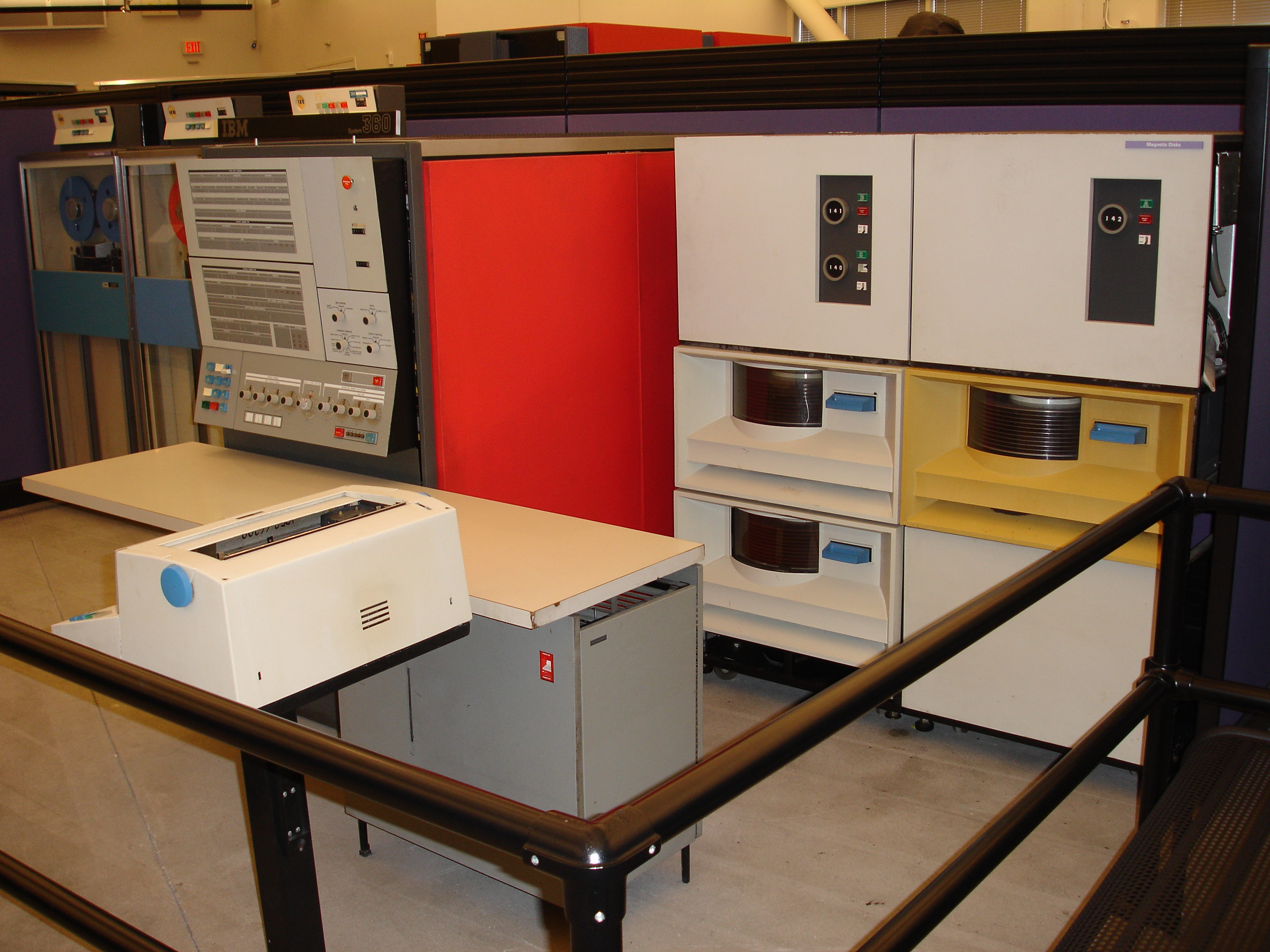
The IBM System/360 computer, built in the Binghamton area

After the boom of the cigar industry in the 1880s, the Binghamton area became increasingly reliant on large manufacturers, with both Endicott Johnson, a shoe manufacturer, and IBM employing 15,000 to 20,000 local workers at their peak. Other companies with a large historical presence included Link Aviation Devices, Ansco, and General Electric. Several other notable businesses started in Binghamton, such as Valvoline, the Nineteen Hundred Washer Company (which merged to form Whirlpool), and Dr. Kilmer's Swamp Root, a famous patent medicine. Dick's Sporting Goods began as a fishing store in the East Side in 1948, and was headquartered in Binghamton until 1994.

Much of Binghamton's current employment base is oriented toward technology and defense manufacturing, though the sector has been diminishing since 1990. Areas of specialization include systems integration, flight simulation, and printed circuit board manufacturing. The largest such companies in the area are Lockheed Martin, BAE Systems, IBM, Sanmina-SCI, and Universal Instruments. Other notable technology firms include i3 Electronics, Rockwell Collins, and L-3 Communications, which absorbed the Link Aviation operations. Although not a large employer, the McIntosh Laboratory is a well-known high-end manufacturer of audio amplifiers, receivers, and other components. Despite the sustained job losses, the Binghamton MSA had 13% of New York State's computer and electronics manufacturing jobs as of 2010.

Education and healthcare are also becoming significant sectors in the regional economy. In particular, Binghamton University and Broome Community College employ many researchers and educators. Binghamton University has a New York State Center of Excellence for small-scale systems integration, and it has provided the major impetus for the Southern Tier High Technology Incubator in downtown Binghamton, which encourages the growth of local startups. Upstate Medical University has worked to expand its clinical campus by establishing a permanent home at the former New York State Inebriate Asylum on the East Side. Major companies in the private healthcare industry include United Health Services and Lourdes Hospital.

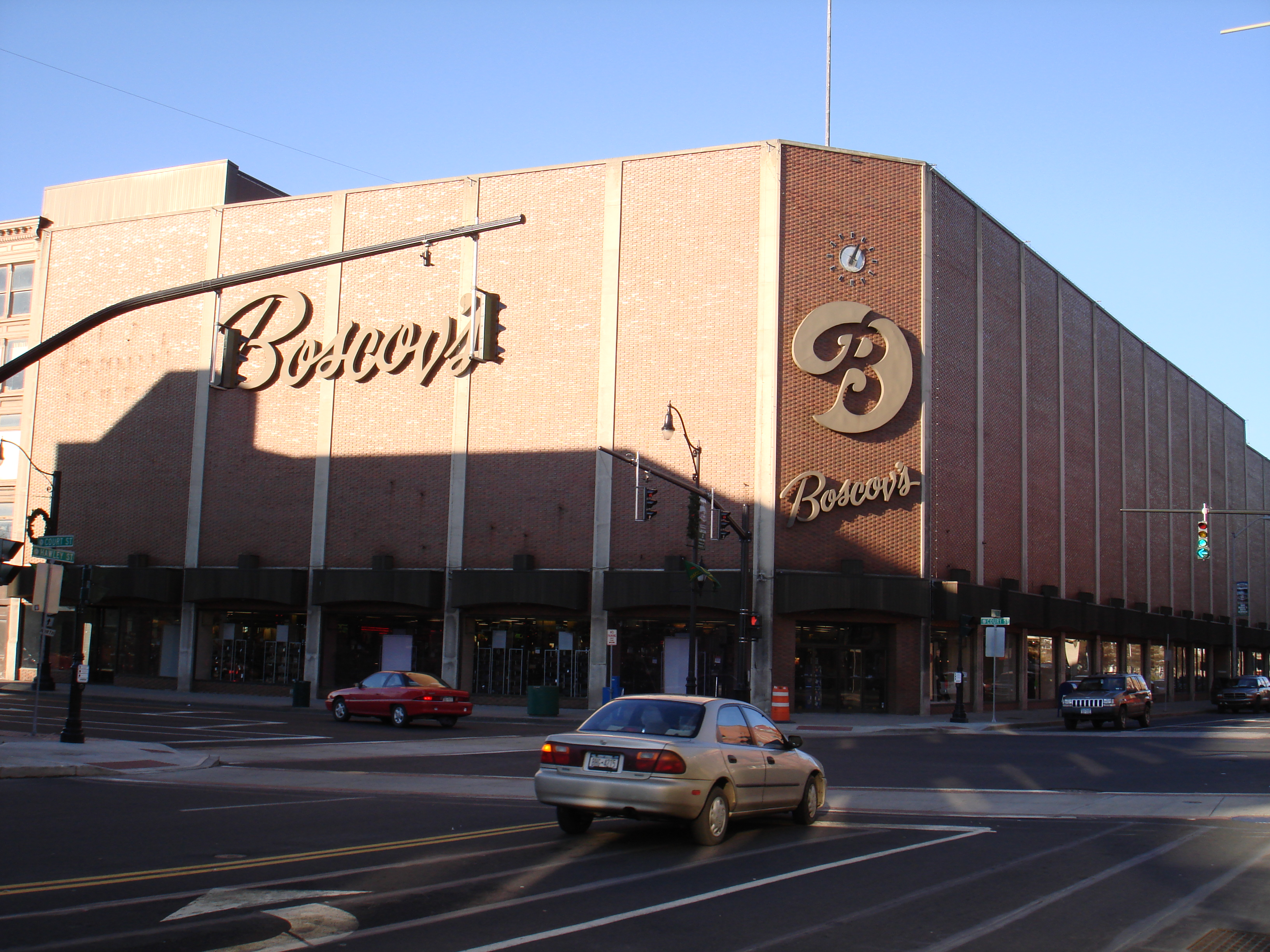
Boscov's in downtown Binghamton

Binghamton also has many food services and distribution companies. Maines Paper & Food Service and Willow Run Foods - two of the nation's largest food distributors who serve restaurants throughout the United States - have their headquarters in the area. Maines is one of the largest private companies in the country. Crowley Foods, a subsidiary of HP Hood, maintains headquarters in Binghamton, and Frito-Lay has a large plant in the region.

Agriculture has long played a notable role in the regional economy, and the farm bureau movement started in Binghamton in 1911.

Other notable local employers include New York State Electric & Gas and Johnson Outdoors. Two insurance companies, Security Mutual Life and Columbian Financial Group, maintain headquarters in the area.

The region has several large shopping areas. Downtown Binghamton is home to a Boscov's department store, and the development of large student housing projects has led to a resurgence of restaurants and service-oriented businesses. While downtown was home to several major department stores and the center of regional shopping, most shopping has moved toward the suburbs. The town of Vestal has several shopping centers and big-box stores along a five-mile stretch of the Vestal Parkway. The village of Johnson City is home to the Oakdale Mall, the area's only indoor super regional mall. Significant commercial development has also taken place in the town of Dickinson, with many shopping centers just north of the city. In the First Ward, Clinton Street is home to Antique Row, a collection of antique shops.

== Arts and culture ==
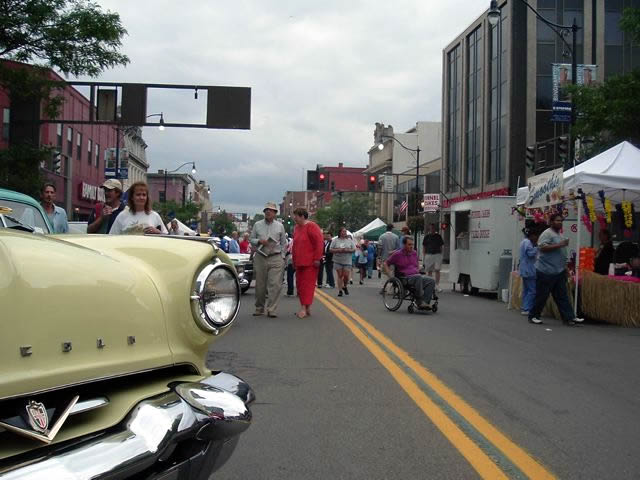
July Fest

Since the early 2000s, the region has developed a growing and pervasive arts scene. These include a large cluster of art galleries and shops centered around downtown Binghamton. These galleries have given rise to the First Friday Art Walk, through the efforts an association of local artists and merchants in Downtown Binghamton. Artists of local prominence that display or have galleries include photorealist painter Anthony Brunelli, Orazio Salati, and Marla Olmstead, a local child who achieved fame in the art world for her abstract art.

The Binghamton Philharmonic is the region's premier professional orchestra. Founded in 1955, it provides symphonic music to all of the Southern Tier. Concerts are performed throughout the year, with a variety of classical, pops and chamber music. The Tri-Cities Opera stages full-scale operas at the Broome County Forum. The professional company has performed since 1949, and is famed for its actor training program. The region also has several other semi-professional and amateur orchestras and theaters such as the Cider Mill Playhouse.

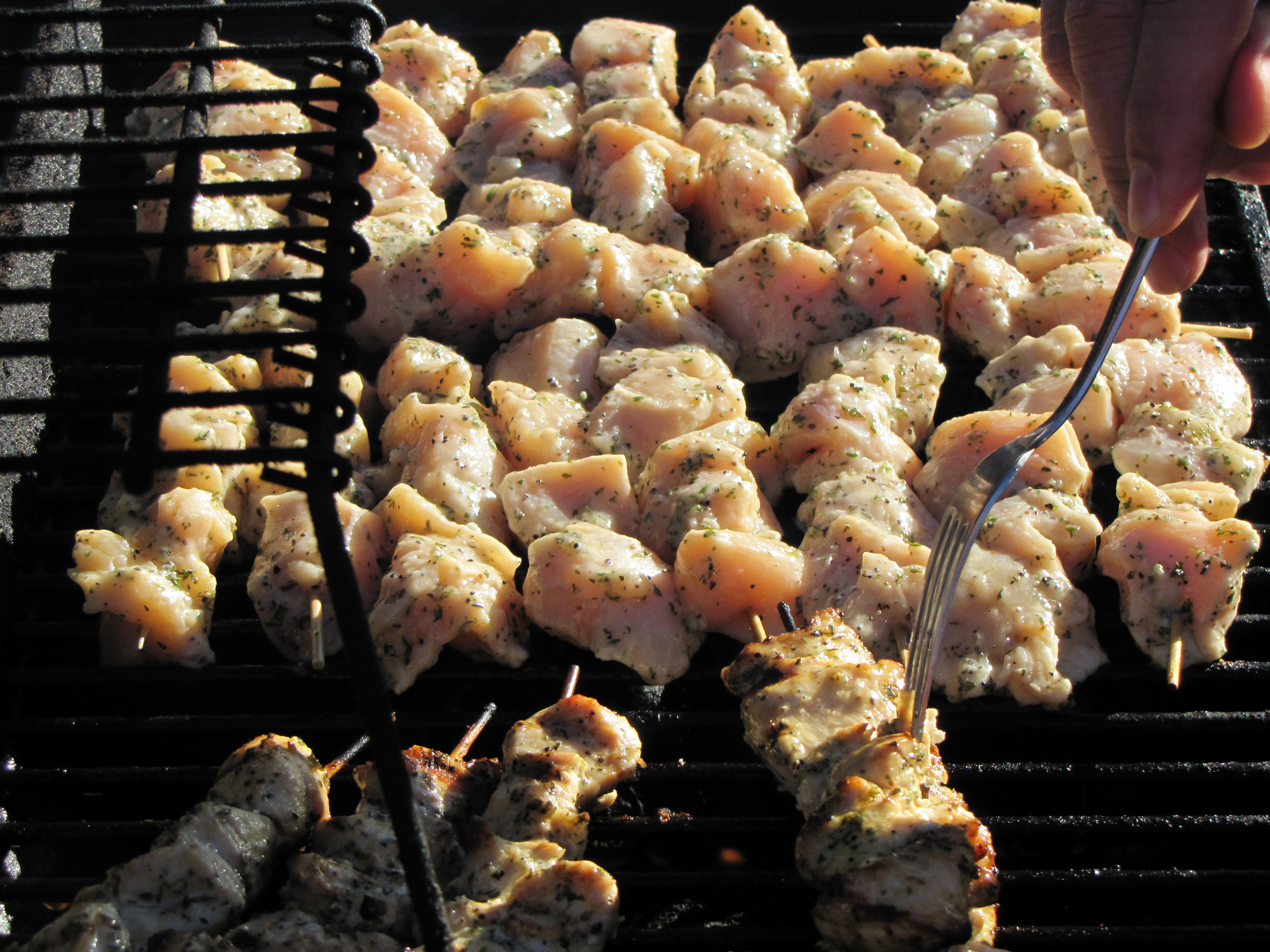
Spiedies being grilled

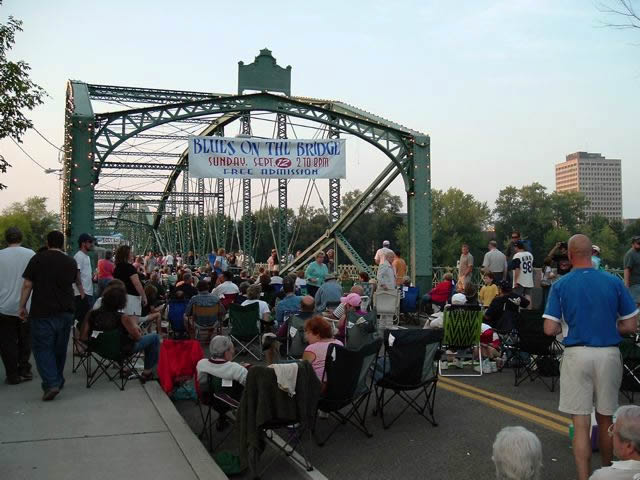
Blues on the Bridge

The Roberson Museum and Science Center, in the heart of Binghamton, is home to the Binghamton Visitor Center, the Link Planetarium, and a number of exhibits detailing the culture and history of Greater Binghamton and the Southern Tier. The Kopernik Observatory & Science Center observatory is the largest public observatory in the northeast United States. The Binghamton Zoo at Ross Park, in the Southside, opened in 1875 and is the fifth-oldest zoo in the nation.

Binghamton is known as the Carousel Capital of the World, as it houses six of the remaining antique carousels. Two are within city limits, one at Recreation Park and another at the Binghamton Zoo at Ross Park. Other visitor attractions include the Phelps Mansion museum, the Cutler Botanic Garden, the Bundy Museum of History and Art, and the interactive, child-oriented Discovery Center. The Center for Technology & Innovation, a museum dedicated to local industry, is under construction.

The area is home to a popular regional dish known as the spiedie. Spiedies are celebrated at the Spiedie Fest and Balloon Rally, which is held at Otsiningo Park each August and attracts over 100,000 people annually.

The city's other annual events include the St. Patrick's Day parade in March, July Fest (a festival of jazz music, arts, and crafts held downtown since 1962), the 100-year-old St. Mary of the Assumption Bazaar in August, the LUMA Projection Arts Festival in September, Binghamton Porchfest (a free annual music festival featuring hundreds of performances staged on West Side residential porches), Blues on the Bridge (a September music festival that takes place on the South Washington Street Bridge), and the Columbus Day Parade and Italian Festival every October, which includes a marching band competition. Broome County is home to several festivals (including a significant concentration of ethnic celebrations due to its heritage), which the New York Department of Economic Development recognized in 2001 as the year's official I Love New York festival, and collectively dubbed the "Festival of Festivals". Notable former festivities include the Yegatta Regatta and the Pops on the River concert.

Residents of Binghamton typically speak the Inland Northern dialect of American English, and the region falls within a distinct isogloss that also contains Buffalo, Rochester, and Syracuse. Much of the local accent has been subject to the Northern Cities Vowel Shift, though this has not fully taken hold. Unlike people in other Inland Northern cities, people in Binghamton typically refer to athletic shoes as sneakers (as opposed to tennis shoes) and to soft drinks as soda (as opposed to pop).

== Sports ==
=== Professional and semi-pro teams ===
Binghamton has a long history with minor league sports, having been home to several teams over the years. The Eastern League, one of the older Double-A baseball leagues in the United States prior to the 2021 Minor League Baseball reorganization, was founded at the Arlington Hotel in downtown Binghamton in 1923. Today, the city hosts two professional minor league teams, the Binghamton Rumble Ponies (a baseball team affiliated with the New York Mets) and the Binghamton Black Bears (an ice hockey team in the Federal Prospects Hockey League). In 2018, the Sports Business Journal ranked the city as the 10th best minor-league sports market in the country.

Club	Sport	League	Founded	Venue	League titles	Championship years
Binghamton Black Bears	Ice hockey	Federal Prospects Hockey League	2021	Visions Veterans Memorial Arena	3	2024, 2025,2026
Binghamton Rumble Ponies	Baseball	Eastern League	1992	Mirabito Stadium	4	1992, 1994, 2014 & 2025
Binghamton Bulldogs	Basketball	American Basketball Association	2017	Bulldogs Sports Complex	0	—
Broome County Stallions	Football	Empire Football League	2018	Stallions Field	0	—

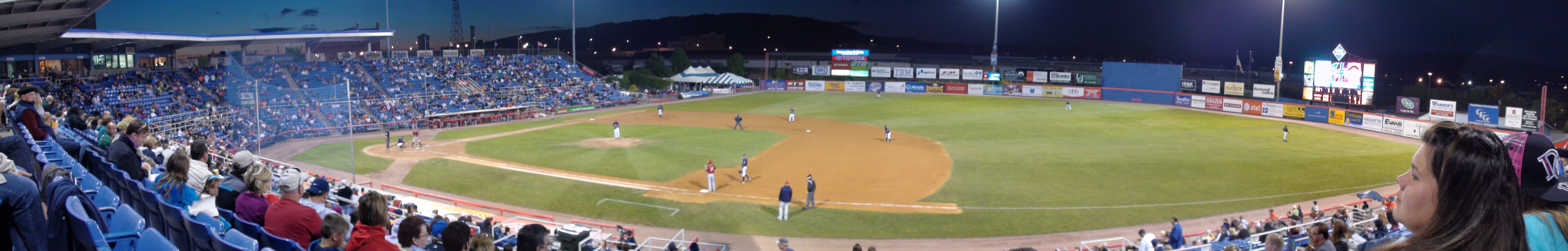
Baseball game at Mirabito Stadium

=== Baseball ===
The area is home to the Eastern League's Binghamton Rumble Ponies, the Double-A affiliate of the New York Mets. The former Binghamton Mets have sent stars like Daniel Murphy, Noah Syndergaard, Steven Matz, Juan Lagares, José Reyes, David Wright, Preston Wilson, Ike Davis, Zack Wheeler, Edgardo Alfonzo, Jon Niese, Pete Alonso and Jay Payton to the majors.

Binghamton has a long history in professional baseball dating back to 1877. Teams nicknamed the Crickets, the Bingoes, and for many years the Triplets represented Binghamton in the New York State League (now defunct), the New York–Pennsylvania League, the International League, and the Eastern League (1892–94, 1938–1963, 1967–1968, 1992–2021).

The 1887 Binghamton Bingoes of the International League attracted national attention when the white players revolted against the two black players on the team. The reaction around the league forced Binghamton to release the black players, and the team folded soon after.

The Binghamton Triplets of the Eastern League, founded in 1923, became a farm club of the New York Yankees in 1932, and sent many players to New York through 1968, when the team folded. Notably, the Hall of Fame pitcher Whitey Ford was a starting pitcher for the Triplets in 1949.

=== Football ===
Binghamton has also been home to two semiprofessional football teams, the Broome-Tioga Bengals (members of the Empire Football League) and the Triple City Jets (members of the North American Football League). In addition, two women's football teams called Binghamton home; the Binghamton Tiger Cats (members of the Independent Women's Football League) and the Southern Tier Spitfire (members of the Women's Football Alliance). As of 2015, none of these teams play. Founded in 2018, the Broome County Stallions play as part of the Northeastern Football Alliance.

=== Golf ===
The B.C. Open was an official PGA Tour event held annually from 1971 to 2005 at Endicott's En-Joie Golf Course. (Note that the 2006 B.C. Open had to be played in Verona, N.Y. due to extensive damage during the June 2006 Flooding of the Susquehanna River.) Beginning in 2007, the area hosted a PGA Tour Champions event, the Dick's Sporting Goods Open. The event replaced the B.C. Open and continues to be played at En-Joie Golf Course in Endicott.

=== Hockey ===
Professional hockey arrived in Binghamton in 1973 with the founding of the Broome Dusters of the North American Hockey League. The Dusters were known for their wide-open style of play, which was unusual in professional hockey at the time. While crowds were sparse at the beginning of the 1973 season, the team's popularity grew and the strength of the Dusters fan base, combined with continuous sellouts, led The Hockey News to declare Binghamton as Hockey Town USA. When the league folded in 1977, the Providence team of the American Hockey League moved to Binghamton and became the Binghamton Dusters. The team became the Binghamton Whalers from 1980 to 1990 and the Binghamton Rangers from 1990 to 1997 as a result of affiliations with the National Hockey League's (NHL) Hartford Whalers and New York Rangers.

Later the Binghamton Senators who were the AHL affiliate of the Ottawa Senators were formed. The B-Sens won division titles in 2003 and 2005, reached the AHL conference finals in 2003 and won the Calder Cup in 2011. The B-Sens sent players such as Jason Spezza, Robin Lehner, Chris Kelly, Jakob Silfverberg, and Jean-Gabriel Pageau to the NHL. The B-Sens relocated to Canada for the 2017–18 season.

When the Senators were relocated, the NHL's New Jersey Devils brought their AHL franchise to the city as the Binghamton Devils with home games at Floyd L. Maines Veterans Memorial Arena. The B-Devils left Binghamton in 2020 during the COVID-19 pandemic and then relocated as the Utica Comets in 2021.

An expansion team in the Federal Prospects Hockey League (FPHL) called the Binghamton Black Bears replaced the Devils at the Veterans Memorial Arena starting with the 2021–22 season. In May 2024, the Binghamton Black Bears won the Commissioner's Cup, sweeping the Carolina Thunderbirds 3–0 in the best-of-five FPHL Finals.

=== Tennis ===
The area was home to an annual Professional Tennis Challenger, the Levene Gouldin & Thompson Tennis Challenger, part of the USTA pro circuit (Known as the Frito-Lay Tennis Challenger in years past) and ATP Challenger Tour, from 1994 to 2019. Tennis greats such as Lleyton Hewitt, James Blake and, more recently, Andy Murray found their start with this tournament, using it as a springboard to the U.S. Open (tennis).

=== NCAA sports ===
Binghamton University plays Division I college sports as a member of the America East Conference. Division III College Sports are played at Broome Community College. Bobby Gonzalez, former head coach of Seton Hall's men's basketball team was born here, and still has family in the area. King Rice, head basketball coach at Monmouth University, attended Binghamton High School.

=== Motorsports ===
Since 1978 a round of the American Motorcyclist Association's Motocross Championship has taken place at the nearby Broome-Tioga Sports Center. This round of the series recently moved to Texas and is no longer hosted by the Broome-Tioga Sports Center. They also host the New York State Motocross Championships each fall and many other semi-pro events throughout the season.

== Parks and recreation ==
Binghamton is known for its bicycling and walking clubs, facilities, and trails. The Binghamton River Trail is an urban trail starting at Confluence Park, where the rivers merge, and traveling alongside the Chenango River, past the Martin Luther King Jr. Promenade and Noyes Island, up to Cheri A. Lindsey Park in the North Side.

== Government ==
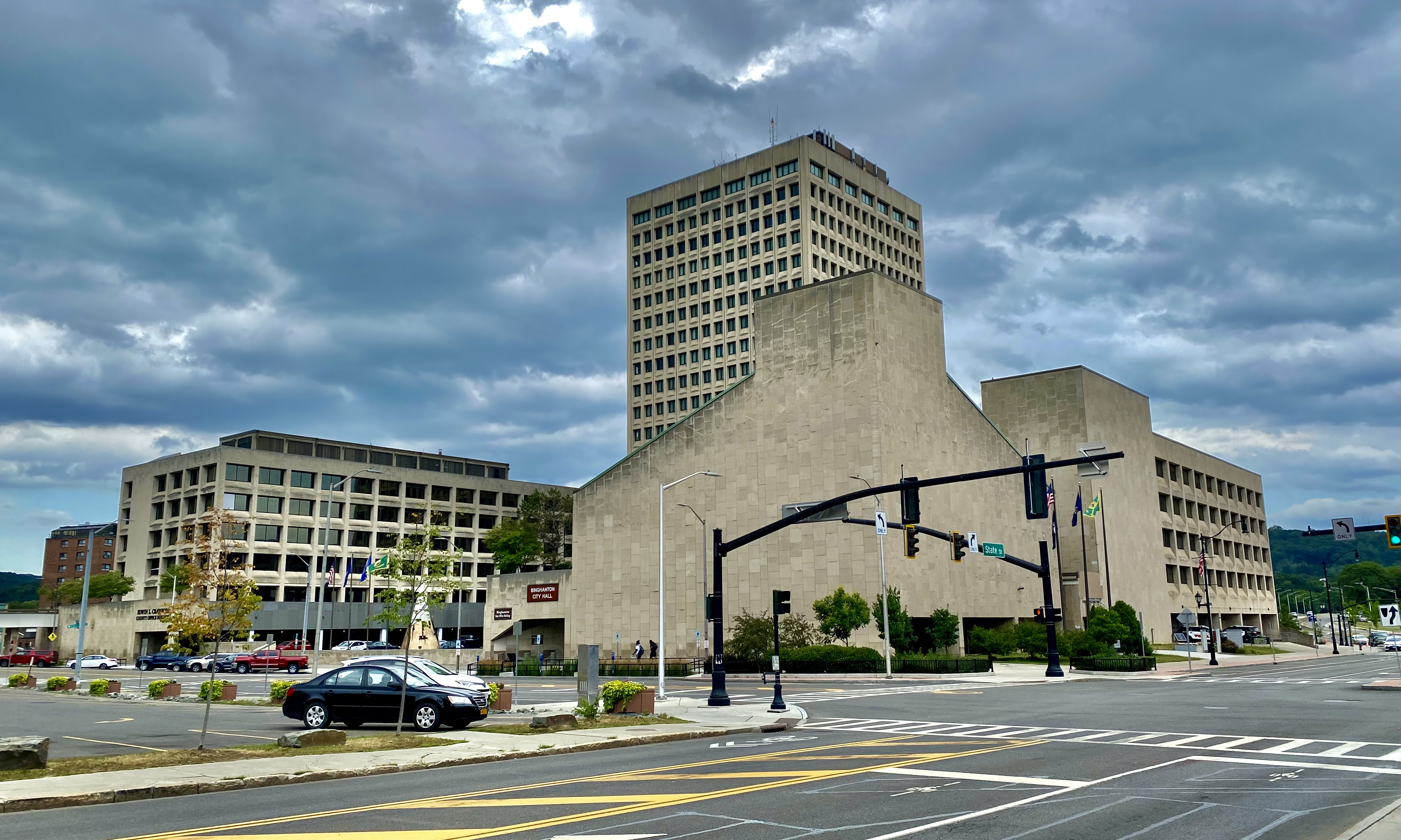
Government Plaza

Since its incorporation as a city in 1867, Binghamton has been a municipality with a "strong" mayor–council form of government. The city government, originally housed in the old Municipal Building on Collier Street (now the Grand Royale Hotel), is now based at the Binghamton City Hall which occupies the west-wing of Government Plaza on the corner of State and Hawley streets. The mayor and councilors are elected to four-year terms and are limited to serving two terms. The Binghamton City Council is a unicameral body of seven Council members whose districts are defined by geographic population boundaries.

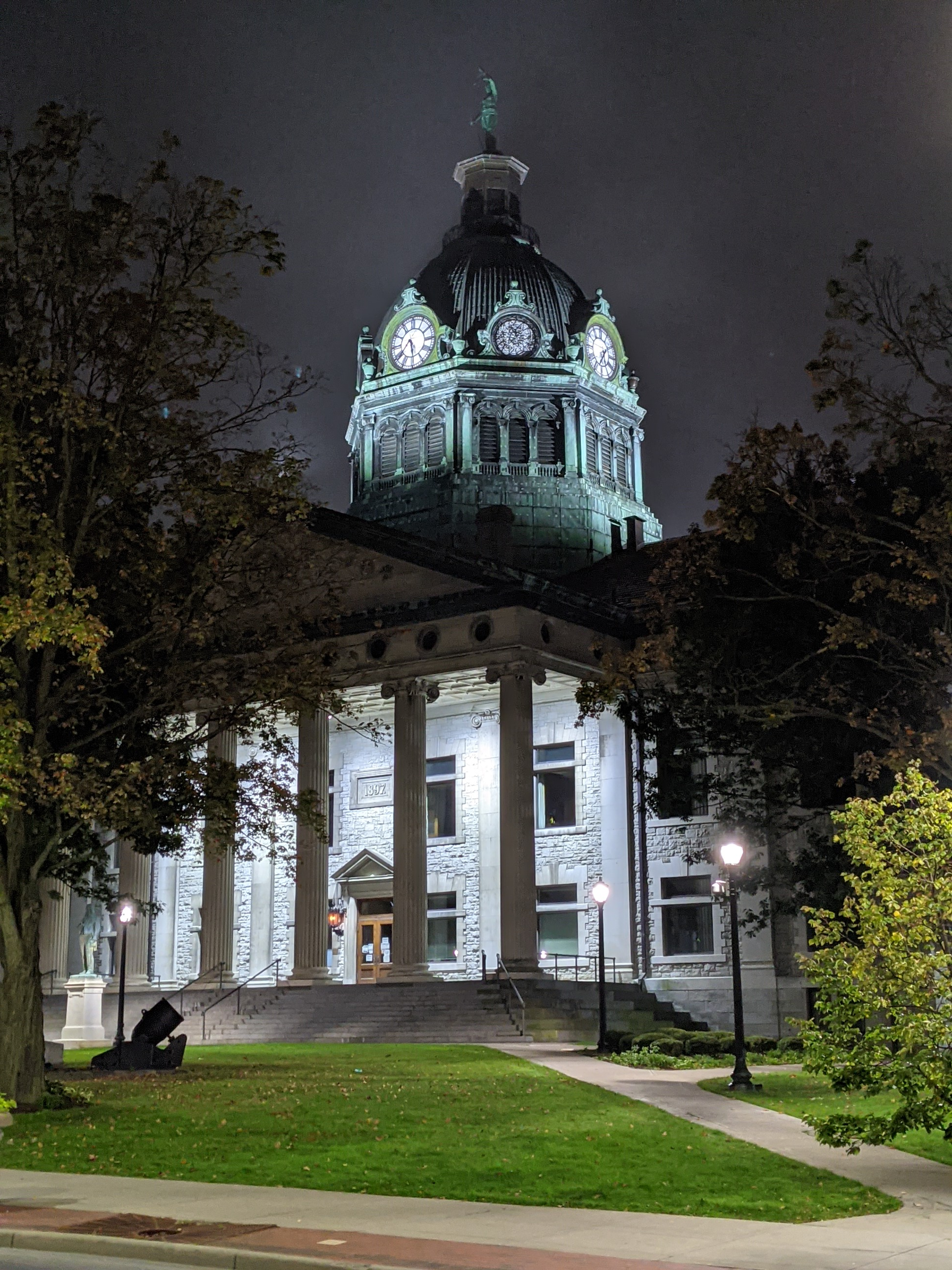
Broome County Courthouse (1898), by local architect Isaac G. Perry

=== Executive ===
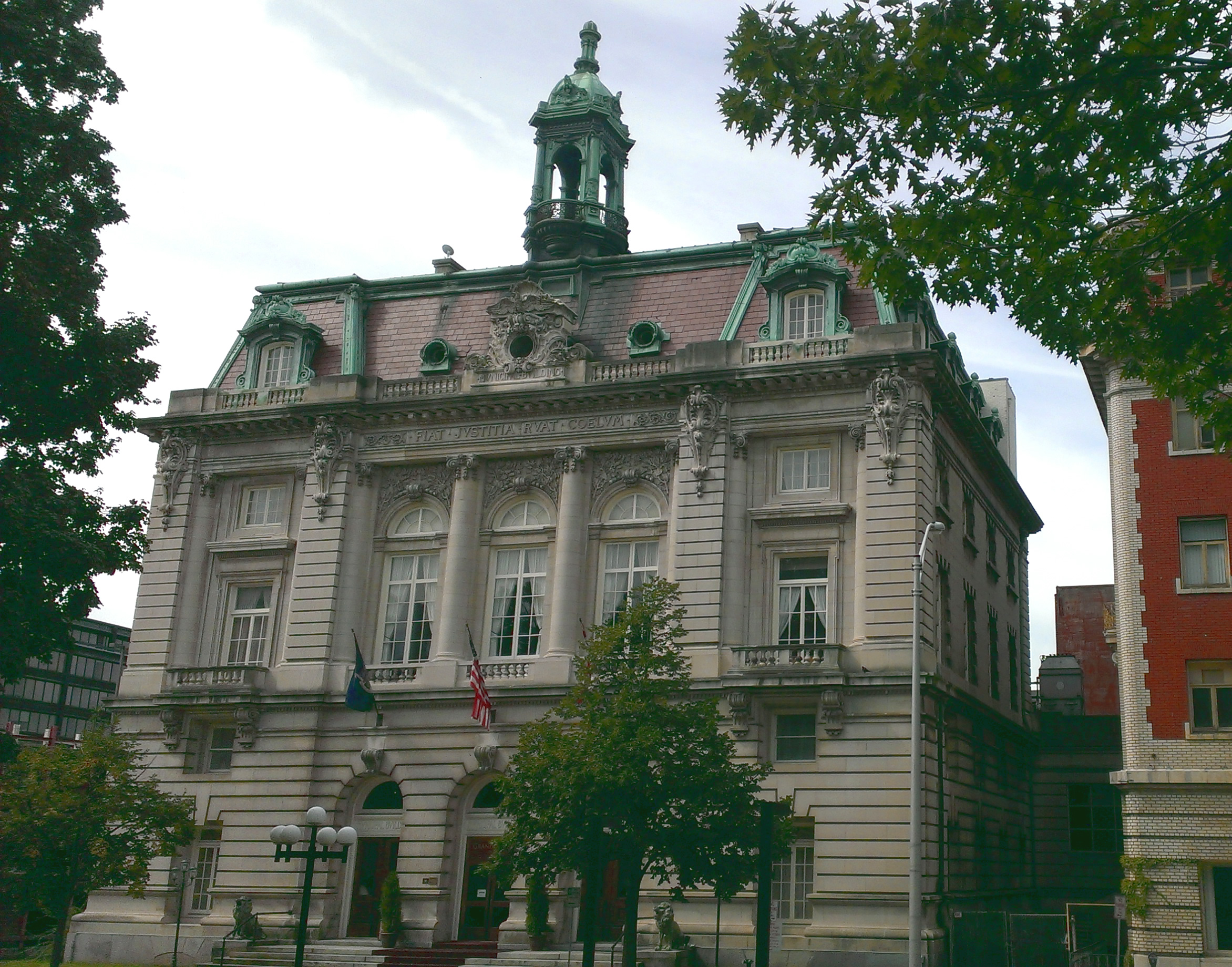
Former city hall

== Education ==
=== Primary and secondary education ===
The public Binghamton City School District is the largest school district in the metropolitan area, with about 5,000 students enrolled as of 2021. The district consists of Binghamton High School, two middle schools, and seven elementary schools. While the district maintains an International Baccalaureate program and has received several academic awards, it is classified as high needs, and has had difficulty meeting several educational requirements. The Catholic Schools of Broome County, a private school district affiliated with the Roman Catholic Diocese of Syracuse, operate Seton Catholic Central High School and an elementary school in the city of Binghamton.

=== Higher education ===
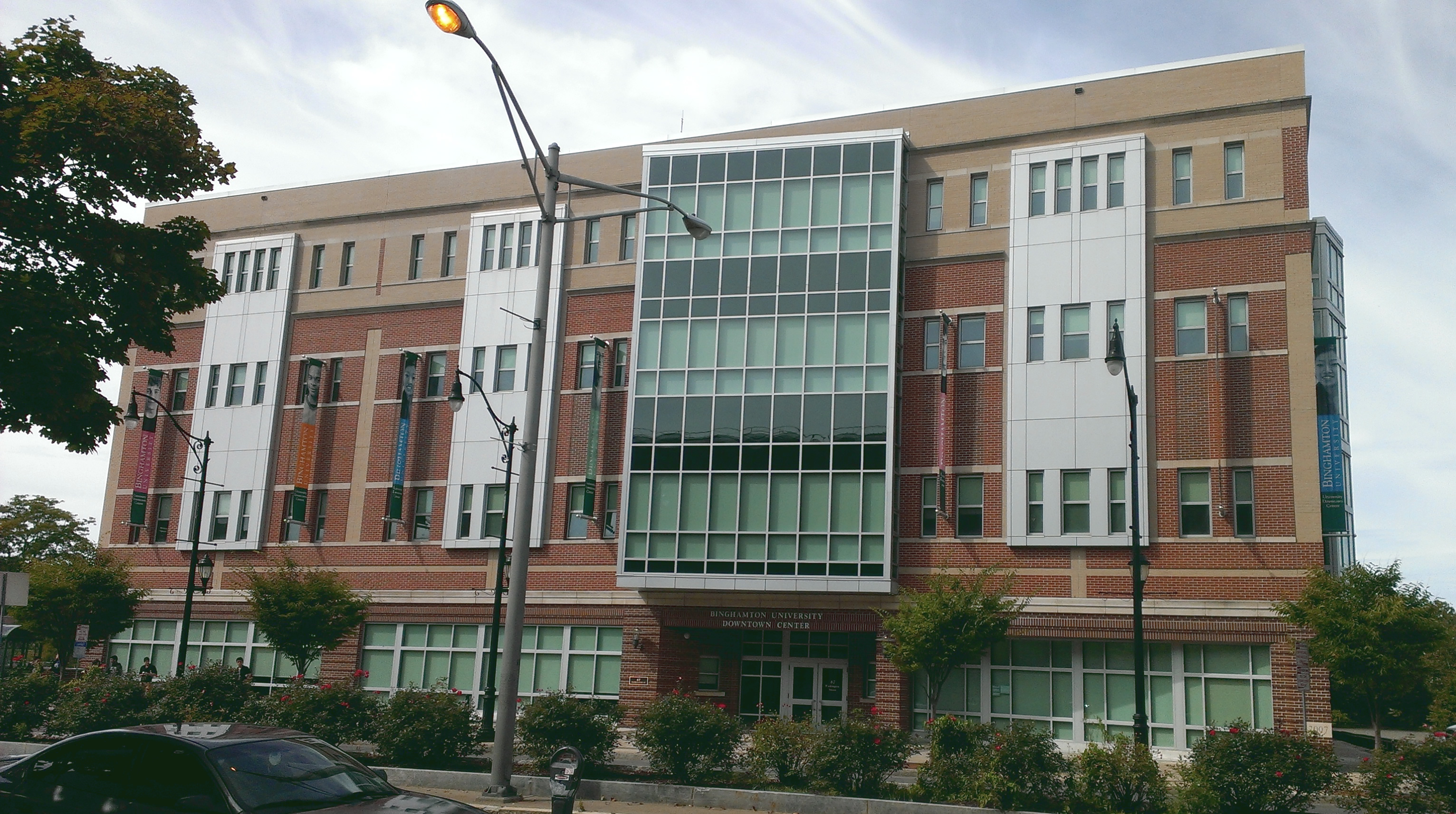
Binghamton University downtown campus

The city of Binghamton is home to three satellite campuses:

- The downtown campus of Binghamton University (a State University of New York), which houses the College of Community and Public Affairs.
- A clinical campus of State University of New York Upstate Medical University, established in the city limits for third and fourth year medical students in 1979. Students spend their first two years of medical school in Syracuse, New York and then complete their training in Binghamton.
- An Empire State College location in the State Office Building.

The city was home to the now-defunct Ridley-Lowell Business & Technical Institute, which was founded in Binghamton in 1850.

The suburb of Vestal is home to the main campus of Binghamton University. The university, one of four university centers in the SUNY system, has approximately 19,000 students. Binghamton University is a selective top-ranking public university, and is considered to be a Public Ivy. It also has a large research presence, including a New York State Center of Excellence for small-scale systems integration. While the campus is in Vestal, many students who live off-campus find housing in the West Side. There has also been a recent push for student housing downtown to help revitalize the business district. In addition to its downtown campus, the university operates the Southern Tier High Technology Incubator in the city, and it is restoring the New York State Inebriate Asylum on the East Side for future use.

SUNY Broome (formerly Broome Community College) is just north of the city in Dickinson. A two-year SUNY college, the school has 6,000 commuter students. Formerly specializing in technical education, SUNY Broome started in downtown Binghamton and stood at the Washington Street Armory until a fire in 1951. The college built the Student Village residence hall on campus in 2014 to attract residential students. SUNY Broome also offers courses at several off-campus locations, two of which are in the city. The college is renovating the former Carnegie Library into the SUNY Broome Culinary & Event Center, which will house its hospitality programs.

== Media ==
The Press & Sun-Bulletin is the only major daily paper in Binghamton. As of 2014, the region makes up the 159th largest television market in the United States, as well as the 187th largest radio market. The market is served by TV stations affiliated with the major American broadcast networks, including WBNG-TV 12 (CBS/CW), WBGH-CD 20 (NBC), WIVT 34 (ABC), and WICZ-TV 40 (Fox). WSKG-TV 46 is Binghamton's PBS member station, and serves a large portion of the Southern Tier. Most Binghamton radio stations are owned by one of three groups: Townsquare Media, iHeartMedia, or the locally based Equinox Broadcasting.

== Infrastructure ==
=== Transportation ===
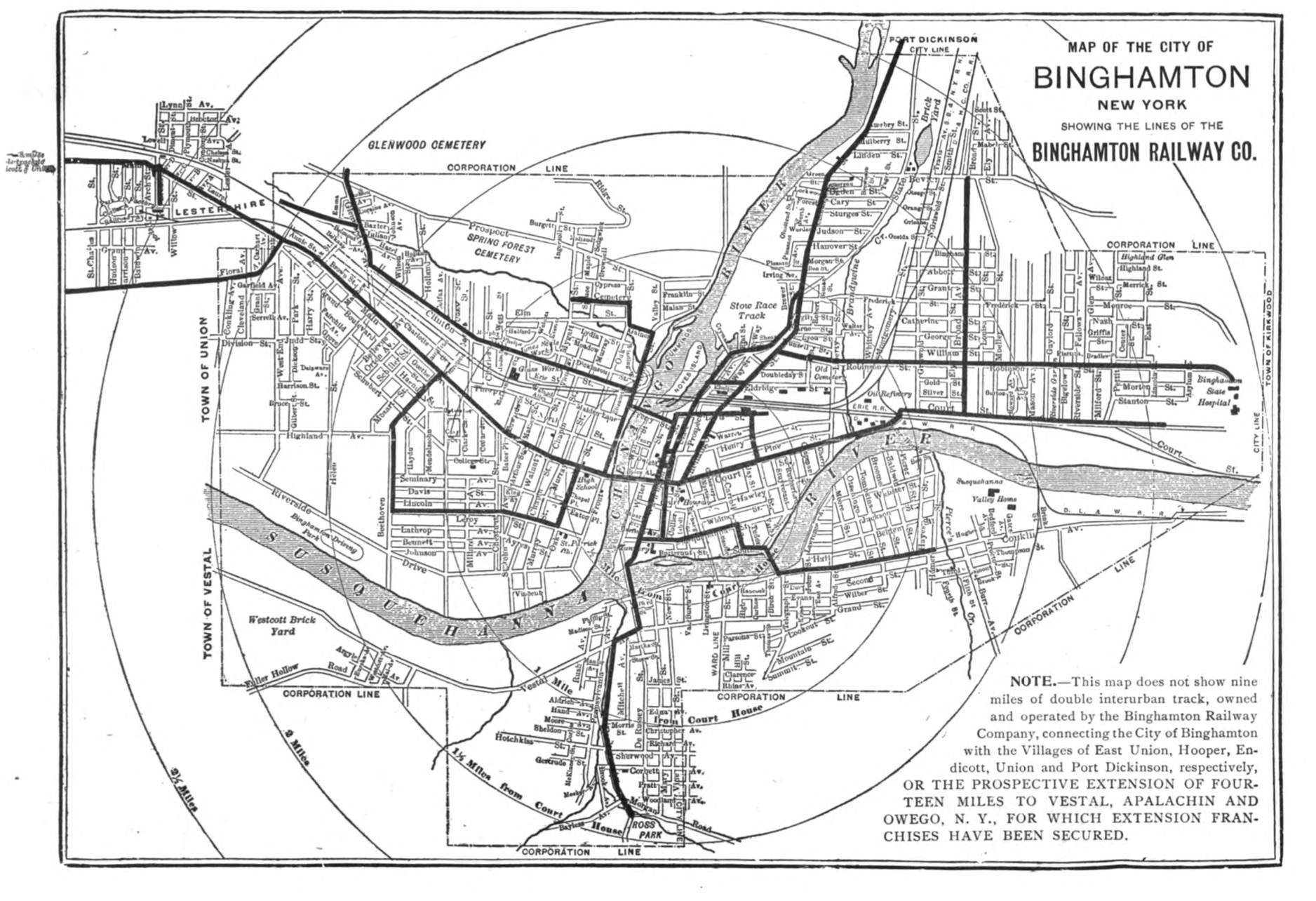
Map of Binghamton Railway Company c 1907

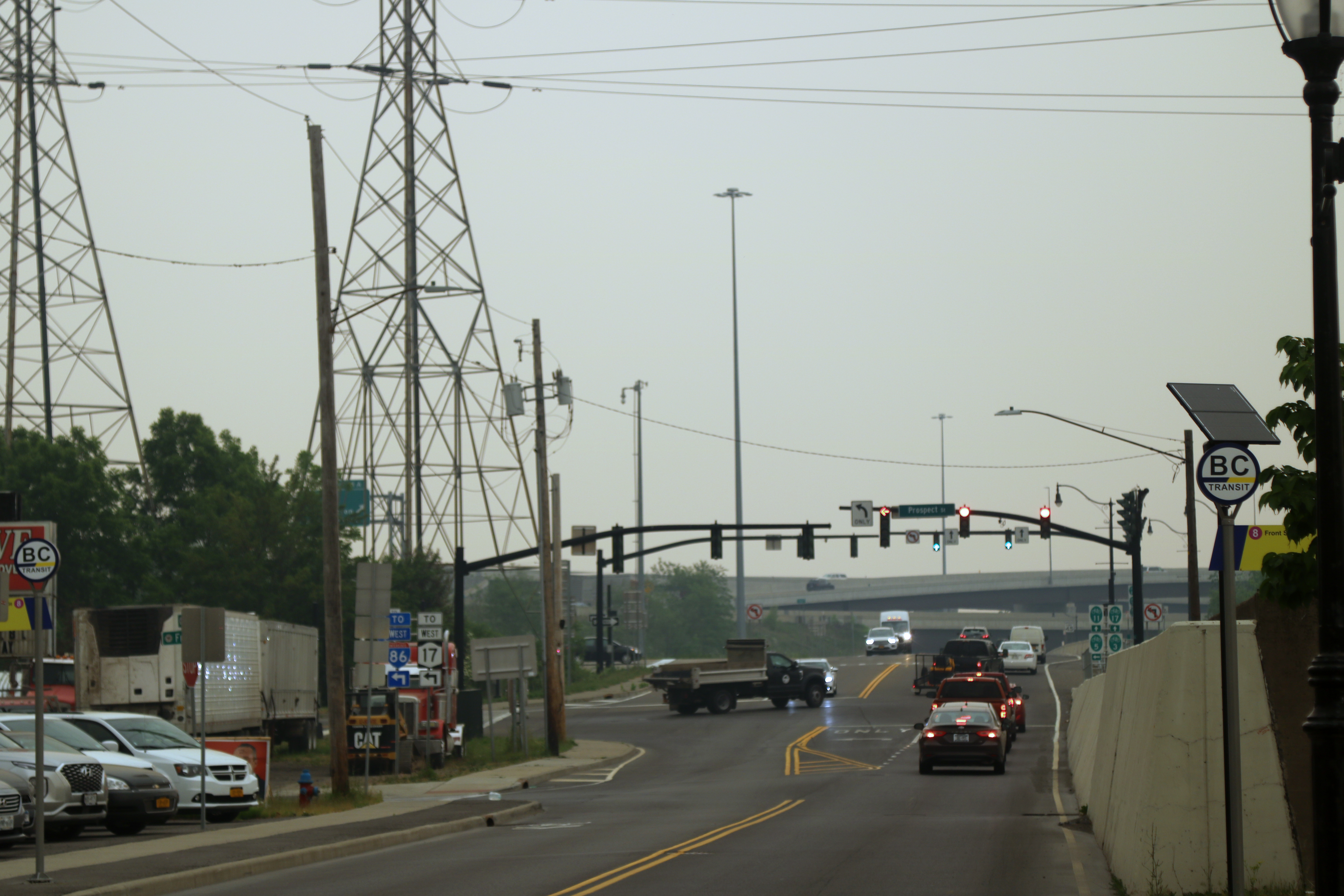
U.S. Route 11 in the city of Binghamton, New York.

Binghamton is a major junction in the Interstate Highway System, much as it was during the days of the railroad. Interstate 81, a major north–south route, connects the city to Syracuse and Ontario, as well as to Pennsylvania and Appalachia. Binghamton is also the western terminus of Interstate 88, which gives a direct route to Albany. New York State Route 17, the Southern Tier Expressway, is being upgraded to Interstate 86, and spans the southern border of New York, providing access to New York City, as well as to the western Southern Tier and Erie, Pennsylvania. Between 1953 and 1966, the state built an arterial system to alleviate traffic, which includes the Brandywine Highway (New York State Route 7), North Shore Drive (New York State Route 363), and the portion of the Vestal Parkway (New York State Route 434) within city limits. Other major thoroughfares in the city include Chenango Street, Main Street (New York State Route 17C), and Court/Front Streets (U.S. Route 11).

B.C. Transit, a daily bus service provided by Broome County, offers public transportation in Binghamton and outlying areas. Binghamton University students are also served by Off-Campus College Transport. Intercity buses originate from the Greater Binghamton Transportation Center, which was opened in 2010 and also serves as the B.C. Transit hub. OurBus offers bus daily service between Ithaca-Binghamton-Manhattan. Greyhound Lines provides direct routes to Buffalo, Syracuse, Rochester, Scranton, Toronto, and New York City. Short Line Buses offer service to Olean, Ithaca, Utica, Albany, New York City, and Long Island. Trailways of New York also has direct service to Albany and Rochester and Megabus has direct service to New York City.

The Greater Binghamton Airport (IATA code BGM, ICAO code KBGM) is a small regional airport, and the only area airport that offers scheduled airline service. Located 10 miles (16 km) north of downtown, it currently has non-stop flights to Detroit on Delta Air Lines and to Orlando, Florida on Avelo Airlines. The region's general aviation airport, Tri-Cities Airport, is 10.5 miles (16.9 km) to the west, in the town of Endicott.

Three freight railroads serve Binghamton. Norfolk Southern Railway serves Binghamton with its Southern Tier Main Line (the former Erie Lackawanna mainline) and on the main line between Schenectady and Scranton, Pennsylvania (formerly the Delaware and Hudson Railway). The New York, Susquehanna and Western Railway maintains lines from Binghamton to Syracuse and Utica, and the Central New York Railroad offers freight service to Port Jervis. Binghamton has no railroad passenger service. The last scheduled service, the Lake Cities train from Hoboken, New Jersey to Chicago, ended on January 6, 1970. New York Senator Chuck Schumer is pushing for passenger rail service between Binghamton and New York City via Scranton and the Lackawanna Cut-Off.

=== Utilities ===
Electricity and natural gas service are supplied and distributed by New York State Electric and Gas. The city's only cable provider is Charter Spectrum, which also offers high-speed internet and digital phone. Verizon provides local telephone and internet service. Greenlight Networks offers fiber-optic internet. The City Department of Public Works handles garbage and recycling, and maintains city street lights.

The city government maintains water and sewer services. Binghamton's primary source of potable water is the Susquehanna River, which is fed through a water treatment facility. Sewage is treated and released back into the Susquehanna downstream, at the Binghamton–Johnson City Joint Sewage Treatment Plant. The sewage plant was severely damaged by Tropical Storm Lee, and will require $90 million of repairs.

=== Healthcare ===
United Health Services (UHS) operates Binghamton General Hospital in the Southside and Wilson Medical Center in Johnson City, while the Guthrie Clinic operates Guthrie Lourdes Hospital on the West Side. The Dr. Garabed A. Fattal Community Free Clinic is run by Upstate Medical University, and offers services with the Broome County Health Department and United Health Services. The New York State Office of Mental Health operates the Greater Binghamton Health Center, which will become a regional center of excellence for children's behavior.

== Sister cities ==
Binghamton has two sister cities, as designated by Sister Cities International:

- Borovichi, Novgorod Oblast, Russia
- La Teste-de-Buch, Gironde, Aquitaine, France

Binghamton also has a local sister city project:

- El Charcón, La Libertad, El Salvador

== See also ==
- List of people from Binghamton, New York
- National Register of Historic Places listings in Broome County, New York
