= Binghamton Philharmonic =

American symphony orchestra

The Binghamton Philharmonic before a performance at the Forum Theater in 2021

The Binghamton Philharmonic, officially named the Binghamton Philharmonic Orchestra, is an American symphony orchestra located in Binghamton, New York. Its primary performing venue is the Broome County Forum Theatre. Its regular season consists of a classical music concert series and a pops concert series. The BPO's mission is "building community through the power of live music."

The orchestra traces its roots to 1949, when Fritz and Marie Wallenberg started a chamber orchestra in Binghamton. By 1955, the Wallenbergs founded the Binghamton Symphony. The Binghamton Symphony merged with the BC Pops orchestra in 1996 to form the Binghamton Philharmonic.

Starting in 1980, the BC Pops held a free annual summer concert known as Pops on the River, where the orchestra would play on a raft floating on the Chenango River in Downtown Binghamton. The concert was popular, drawing tens of thousands of attendees each year, but was canceled due to a lack of funding after the 1994 concert. The Binghamton Philharmonic revived the tradition in 2018, again attracting thousands of concert goers. The philharmonic also takes part in the annual LUMA Projection Arts Festival, playing pieces that are coordinated to a projection mapping show.

The current musical director of the philharmonic is Daniel Hege, who has held the position since May 2018. Prior conductors and music directors include Fritz Wallenberg, David Loebel, John Covelli, and José-Luis Novo.
