= Southside, Binghamton =

Coordinates: 42°5′N 75°55′W

Southside
- City of Binghamton neighborhood
- Interactive map of Southside
- Country: United States of America
- State: New York
- County: Broome County
- City: Binghamton
- Area code: 607
- Website: www.binghamton-ny.gov

The Southside, as the name implies, is a neighborhood in the southern section of the New York State city of Binghamton. It is primarily a residential neighborhood with some commercial and industrial activity along Vestal and Conklin avenues.

Binghamton and Vestal, east of the remainder of Vestal, west of the town of Conklin and south of the Susquehanna River and the rest of the City of Binghamton.

The area's "main drags" are Vestal and Conklin avenues, which, in accordance with their name, connect Binghamton with those neighbors.

Due to the large differences between the east and west sections of the Southside, it is home to two neighborhood assemblies; Southside East and Southside West.

== Southside East ==
Southside East can be defined as the area of the Southside of Binghamton east of Pennsylvania Avenue, stretching south and east to the Binghamton and Conklin town lines. The western section of South Side East is an urban neighborhood with blocks upon blocks of single to multiple-family dwellings. The eastern section is almost exclusively suburban in character in addition to containing some of the city's public housing developments which are composed of townhouses. The schoolchildren of the Southside East district attend Benjamin Franklin Elementary, then East Middle School. On the 2013 NY State English and Math Test scores for Benjamin Franklin Elementary School, depending upon grade, 4.2-10.8% of students met the new state standards in math and 7.2-9.5% met the new state standards in ELA. The majority of students placed in Level 1 for math and ELA. Results for East Middle School show 13.9-14.2% of students met the new state ELA standards and 6–7.6% met the math new state standards. Approximately half of the students placed in Level 1.

== Southside West ==
Southside West is the area of the Southside west of Pennsylvania Avenue, stretching south and west to the Binghamton and Vestal town lines. The entire area is suburban in character with mansion-like homes on large plots strung along the rolling hills. Most of the Southside West stretches up South Mountain, also Ross Mountain. The schoolchildren attend MacArthur Elementary and, in most cases, West Middle School. Due to displacement from the flood, results for MacArthur Elementary are not available for 2013. Test scores the previous year, based on the lower state standards, showed performance to be similar to state averages. Results for West Middle School indicate 23.3-28.1% of students met the new ELA standards while 16.9-20.6% met the new math standards. Between 28.8 and 40.8% placed at Level 1 in ELA while 31.3-44.8 placed in Level 1 for Math.

== Southbridge Central Commercial District ==
The Southbridge Central Commercial District is located around S. Washington St., Vestal Ave., and the easternmost section of Rt. 434. It has several shops and restaurants, a Lourdes Hospital "Primary Care Associates" building, a Lourdes Hyperbaric Oxygen Therapy Building, and 1 or 2 Cyber Cafes.
