= Security Mutual Life Insurance Company of New York =

American insurance company

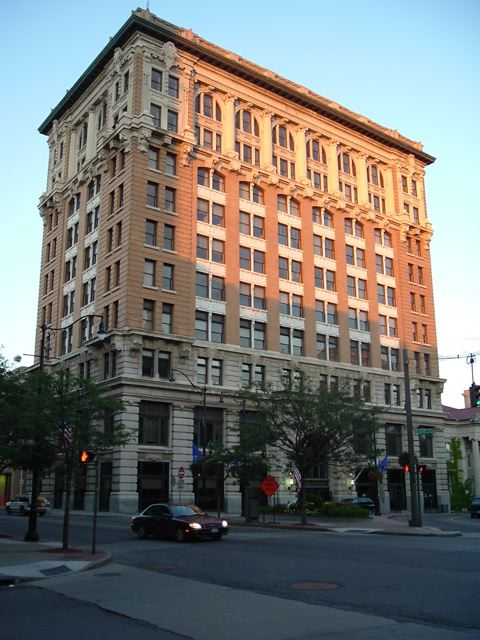
- Security Mutual Life Building (1905), a Beaux-Arts landmark by T. I. Lacey & Son
- Formerly: Security Mutual Life Association
- Company type: Mutual insurance company
- Industry: Insurance
- Founded: 1886; 140 years ago
- Headquarters: Binghamton, New York, United States
- Products: Life Insurance, Annuities, Accident and Health
- Subsidiaries: Security Mutual Life Insurance Company of New York; SML Agency Services; Inc. (SAS), Security Administrators, Inc. (SAI); Archway Technology Services, Inc. (ATS)
- Website: www.smlny.com

Security Mutual Life Insurance Company of New York is an American mutual insurance company. It is headquartered in Binghamton, New York, United States.

The company includes Security Mutual Life Insurance Company of New York, SML Agency Services, Inc. (SAS), Security Administrators, Inc. (SAI), and Archway Technology Services, Inc. (ATS).

== History ==
Security Mutual Life Insurance Company of New York was originally incorporated as a mutual assessment association under the name Security Mutual Life Association on November 6, 1886 and commenced business on January 3, 1887. On May 31, 1898, the company re-incorporated as Security Mutual Life Insurance Company. It was reorganized on December 28, 1899 as a legal reserve mutual company. Security Mutual Life Insurance Company changed its name to Security Mutual Life Insurance Company of New York in 1960. The Company is a mutual life insurance company owned by its policyholders, and operates primarily in the Northeast United States.

Bruce Boyea was named president and CEO of Security Mutual Life Insurance Company of New York in 1996. In 2019, the company elected Kirk Gravely president, while Boyea remained CEO and chairman.

Security Mutual Life Insurance Company of New York is currently licensed in all 50 states, as well as in the District of Columbia and the U.S. Virgin Islands.

== Products ==
The company sells life insurance, annuities, and accident and health coverage.

== See also ==
- List of United States insurance companies
