= State Street–Henry Street Historic District =

Historic district in New York, United States

- U.S. National Register of Historic Places
- U.S. Historic district
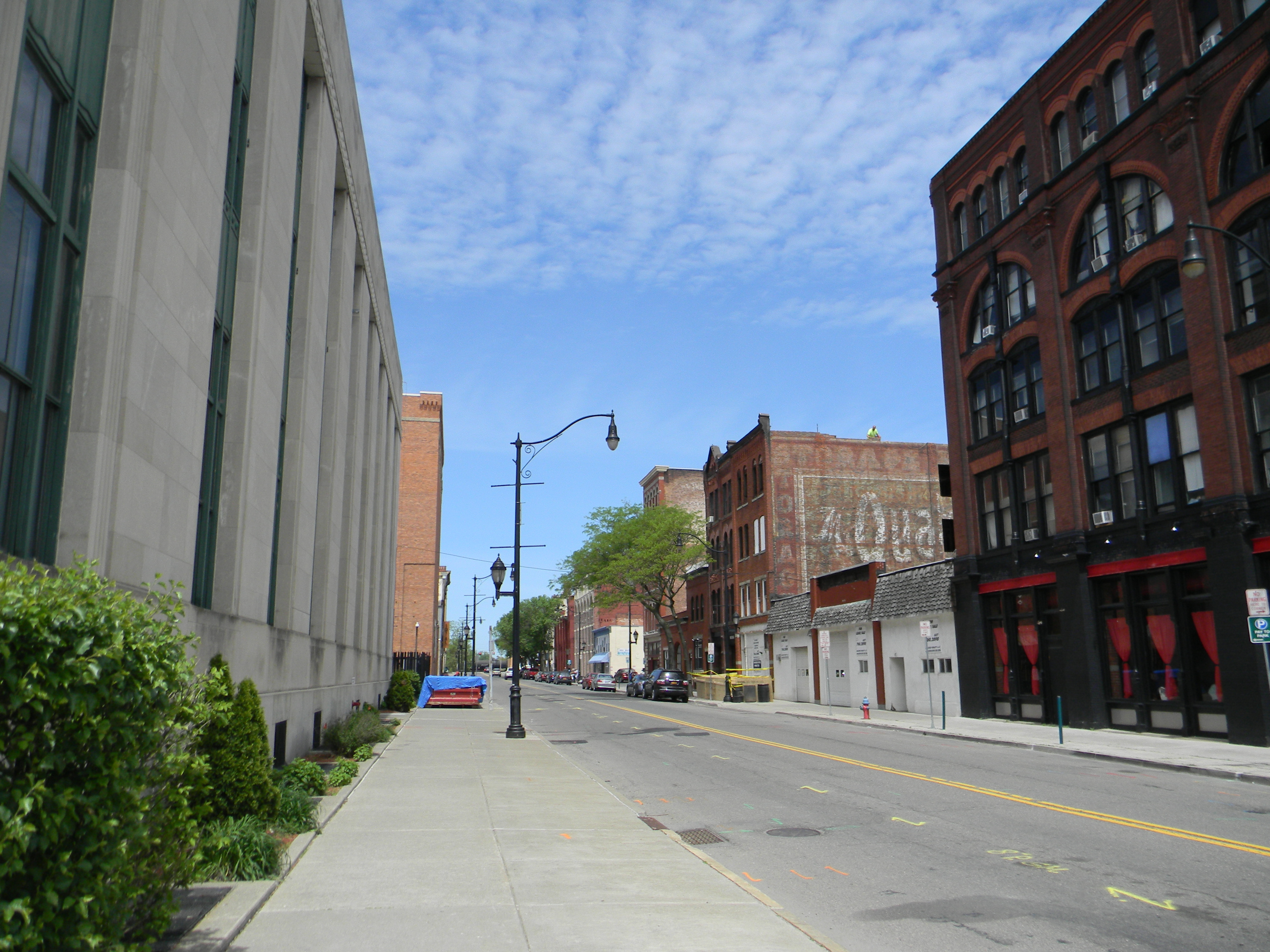
- Looking North up State Street, May 2017

- Location within New York Location within the United States
- Location: Roughly bounded by Lewis St., Prospect Ave., Henry St., and Water and Washington Sts., Binghamton, New York
- Coordinates: 42°6′5″N 75°54′44″W
- Area: 7 acres (2.8 ha)
- Architectural style: Late 19th And 20th Century Revivals, Late Victorian, Art Deco
- NRHP reference No.: 86001384 (original); 100009963 (increase)

Significant dates
- Added to NRHP: June 25, 1986
- Boundary increase: February 26, 2024

State Street–Henry Street Historic District is a national historic district located at Binghamton in Broome County, New York. When first listed, the district included 20 contributing buildings. The district lies north of the central business district in an area long associated with small manufacturing and commercial establishments. The majority of the buildings were built in the late 19th or early 20th century and all but two are built of brick with an average height of four stories. Located within the district is the U.S. Post Office and Courthouse.

It was listed on the National Register of Historic Places in 1986.
