= Cutler Botanic Garden =

Botanical garden in Binghamton, New York

Coordinates: 42°06′08″N 75°54′42″W

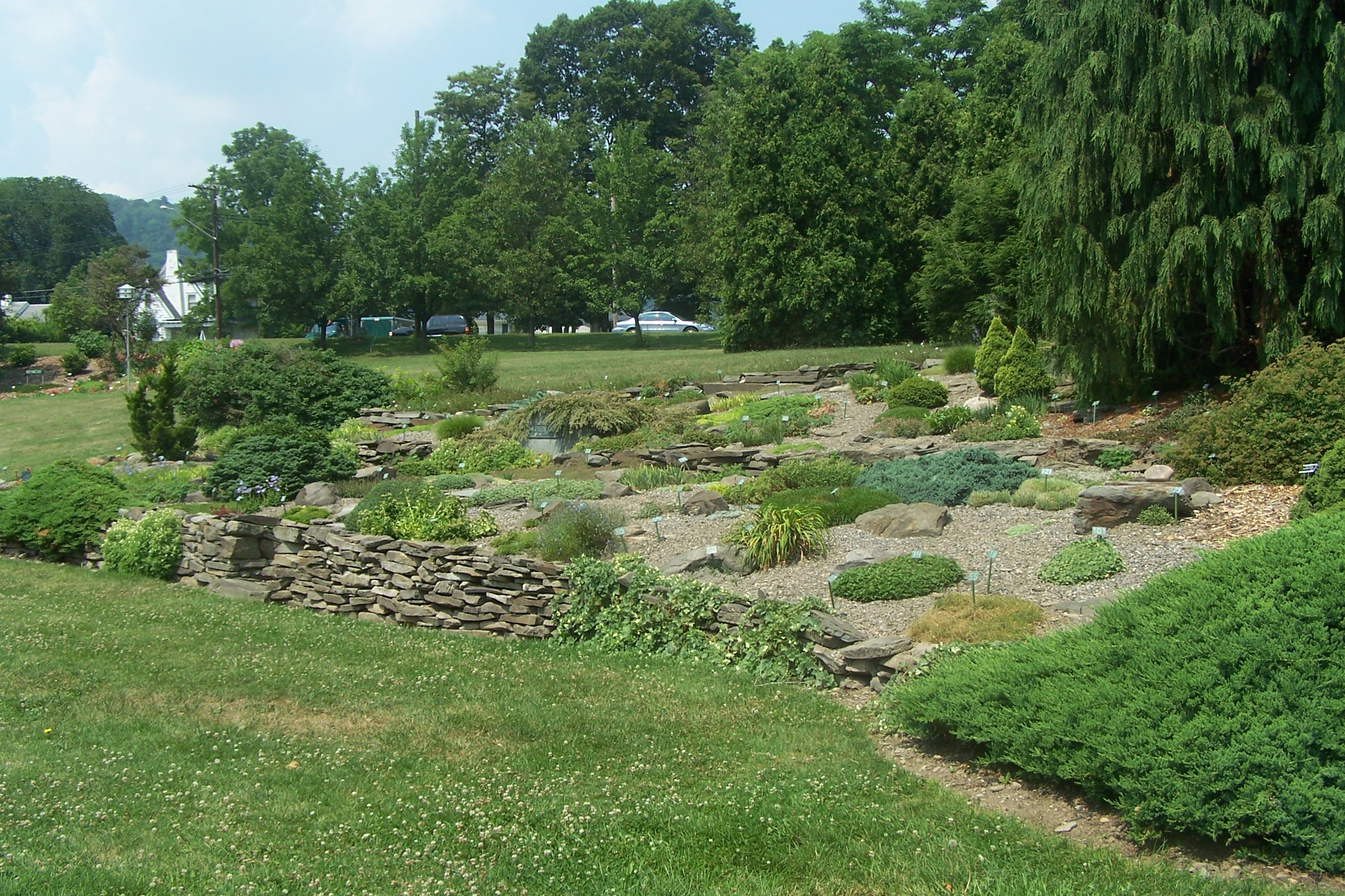
- Interactive map of Cutler Botanic Garden
- Area: 3.5 acres (1.4 ha)
- Owner: Cornell University
- Website: Official website

Cutler Botanic Garden (3.5 acres) is a botanical garden located at 840 Front Street, Binghamton, New York. It is open daily, without charge.

The garden was established by Miss Frances Cutler, who donated land to the Cornell University Cooperative Extension. In 1978 the idea began for a botanical garden, and the garden opened to the public in 1979.

Today, the Garden is an outdoor classroom for teaching horticulture and environmentalism, as well as a display garden for All-American Selections.

== See also ==
- List of botanical gardens in the United States
