= United Health Services =

Medical facility provider

Coordinates: 42°5′11.5″N 75°54′54.5″W

- Company type: Non-profit hospital
- Headquarters: Binghamton, United States
- Area served: Southern Tier area in New York State
- Key people: John Carrigg, President and CEO
- Products: Health Care Services
- Revenue: 899 million (in 2019)
- Operating income: 15 million (in 2019)
- Website: Official website

United Health Services (UHS) (United Health Services Hospitals, Inc.) is the largest and most comprehensive provider of healthcare services in upstate New York's Southern Tier.

A locally owned, not-for-profit system, it is governed by a volunteer board of directors composed of residents from around the region. Founded in Greater Binghamton in 1981, UHS was formed through the consolidation of three highly respected community hospitals. Over the years it has grown to encompass four hospitals, long-term care and home care services, walk-in centers and affiliated physician practices in Broome and surrounding counties.

The organization operates primary care centers throughout Broome, Chenango, Delaware and Tioga, Otsego, and Sullivan counties, plus school-based health centers that offer primary and preventive care to students in the region.

UHS cares for two-thirds of the population of the Southern Tier region and produces $1.3 billion a year in total non-profit economic impact. With a 6,300-member work force across 60 locations, UHS is one of the region's largest employers.

UHS is the regional referral center for a number of life-saving and life-enhancing medical, surgical and rehabilitative specialties, including: trauma and emergency care, heart and vascular surgery, cardiac care, neurosurgery and neurosciences, cancer care, orthopedics, behavioral health services, high-risk obstetrics, neonatal intensive care, and physical rehabilitation.

A teaching hospital, UHS Wilson Medical Center is home to a long-standing medical residency program, training tomorrow's practicing doctors. The program is an affiliate of the Clinical Campus at Binghamton of SUNY Upstate Medical University in Syracuse and the New York Institute of Technology College of Osteopathic Medicine.

== Member organizations ==
Members of United Health Services

- UHS Hospitals
  - UHS Wilson Medical Center, Johnson City
  - UHS Binghamton General Hospital, Binghamton
- UHS Chenango Memorial Hospital, Norwich
  - UHS Senior Living at Chenango Memorial
- UHS Delaware Valley Hospital, Walton
- UHS Senior Living at Ideal, Endicott
- UHS Home Care, Johnson City

== Affiliates ==
Affiliates of United Health Services (UHS):

- UHS Medical Group
- UHS Foundation

== See also ==
- List of hospitals in New York
