= LUMA Projection Arts Festival =

- The official logo of LUMA
- Genre: Conference and festival
- Dates: September (dates vary but generally are the weekend after Labor Day)
- Frequency: Annual
- Locations: Binghamton, New York, U.S.
- Years active: 11
- Inaugurated: 2015
- Founders: Joshua Ludzki, Tice Lerner, Nick Rubenstein
- Next event: September 2026
- Attendance: 30,000
- Website: lumafestival.com

2017 Projection at LUMA "Timeless Tales"

The LUMA Projection Arts Festival is an annual event, typically held in early September, in Binghamton, NY focused on the art of projection mapping. LUMA'a first show was in 2015 with three installations and an audience estimated to be 20,000. The LUMA Projection Arts Festival focuses on large, building-scale installations using a technique known as projection mapping, with the architecture of the city used as the canvas. It is the largest such festival in the United States focusing on this type of art. The conference has continued to expand each year, such as adding elements of interactive media in 2018.

2016 Projection at LUMA

Each year, organizers debut several new animations designed to create the illusion that the neighborhood’s buildings are altering their physical structure. The festival presents additional live elements as a part of the projected works, such as orchestral music, motion captured actors, and audience interactivity. Each of the animations play on a loop throughout the night, separated by short countdowns. Organizers encourage visitors to walk the festival at their own pace and experience it as they would an outdoor art gallery. The work is commissioned both from international and local artists. Previous LUMA installations have included work with internationally recognized artists in cross-collaborative presentations, such as the 2016 debut of the first 3D animation of characters from the BC (comic strip) with featured work from Mason Mastroianni. The COVID-19 pandemic prompted LUMA's organizers to break format in 2020, partnering with Opera Omaha and Tri-Cities Opera Company to present one of the first documented live-streaming virtual reality operas, a production of Kamala Sankaram's Miranda: A Steampunk Opera. The festival returned to its original form the following year and has continued annual events since. Since 2022, LUMA has also engaged in installations beyond the Binghamton, NY area. In 2024, an evening show in New Jersey was produced, and in 2025, LUMA produced the first large-scale projection mapping on the Brooklyn Bridge as part of the Macy’s 4th of July Fireworks Spectacular.
