= Murder of Haley Anderson =

American nursing student murdered in 2018

Haley Anderson
- Born: May 9, 1995; Westbury, Long Island, New York, U.S.
- Died: March 8, 2018 (aged 22); Binghamton, New York, U.S.
- Resting place: Westbury, New York, U.S.
- Education: SUNY Binghamton

Haley Anderson was an American nursing student at Binghamton University. She was murdered on March 8, 2018, by fellow student Orlando Tercero in his apartment off-campus. Tercero fled to Nicaragua after strangling Anderson, was captured by Nicaraguan police, and was ultimately convicted of femicide.

== Background ==
=== Haley Anderson ===
Haley Anderson was from Westbury, New York, the daughter of Karen and Gordon Anderson and older sister to Madeline Anderson. In March 2018, she was twenty-two and a fifth-year senior in nursing. While attending Binghamton University, she worked at Jazzman's, an on-campus coffee shop, for over three years. She planned to graduate in May 2018 and had a job lined up with Northwell Health, at an emergency room of one of its Long Island hospitals. Friends described Anderson as hard working, friendly and compassionate with a love of music.

=== Orlando Tercero ===
Orlando Tercero
- Born: November 2, 1995 (age 30); Miami, Florida, U.S.
- Citizenship: Nicaragua; United States
- Education: SUNY Binghamton
- Status: Incarcerated
- Conviction: Femicide
- Penalty: 30 years imprisonment

Details
- Victims: Haley Anderson, 22
- Date: March 8, 2018
- Country: United States
- State: New York
- Date apprehended: March 13, 2018
- Imprisoned at: Directorate of Judicial Assistance

In March 2018, Orlando Tercero was a twenty-two year old nursing student at Binghamton University. He holds dual Nicaraguan and American citizenship, and his full name is Orlando Enrique Tercero Moreno.

=== Prior relationship and tire slashing incident ===
Tercero was suspected of slashing Anderson's car's tires on September 16, 2017, causing about $600 in damage. The police report included some details about Tercero and Anderson's relationship: they had previously dated for a short period of time. Additionally, on September 15, 2017, Anderson attended a party at Tercero's residence where he confronted her about her new relationship with a mutual friend. According to the police report, the party confrontation went as follows: Tercero shouted at Anderson, then offered her alcohol in an attempt to smooth things over. Anderson declined to press charges over the tire slashing incident.

Tercero and Anderson may have had an off-and-on relationship for up to a year and a half. She reportedly wanted to end romantic involvement with him. According to Anderson's friend, she wanted to stay friends with Tercero.

== Murder and aftermath ==
=== Murder and immediate aftermath ===
Tercero murdered Anderson by manual strangulation on March 8, 2018, at his Oak Street apartment on the West Side of Binghamton, a city in Broome County, New York. She was asphyxiated from manual neck compression, and ligature strangulation due to the necklace she was wearing. His motive for the murder was likely jealousy, as Anderson had moved on from dating him.

Anderson visited Tercero's apartment after a night out with friends. She had been drinking, and was likely sleeping when Tercero attacked her. Surveillance footage showed Anderson and Tercero entering his apartment early in the morning of March 8, and Tercero leaving alone hours later. He drove to John F. Kennedy International Airport and boarded a flight to Nicaragua. Tercero may have attempted to kill himself by hanging after killing Anderson but before leaving his apartment. Police found a note apologizing to his family at the scene. Tercero's sister called 9-1-1 after receiving a concerning text from him on the morning of March 9. Police performed a welfare check at Tercero's residence, but did not make contact with him and left. When Anderson did not return home, her roommates became concerned. On March 9 they tracked her phone to Tercero's apartment, broke in through a window, and found her body in Tercero's bed, with severe bruising on her neck and arms. They called 9-1-1, which brought the police to the apartment for a second time that day.

Anderson's body was found by police on Friday, March 9 at 12:53 PM after they conducted a welfare check at Tercero's apartment. Her death was declared a homicide on Saturday, March 10 after an autopsy was conducted at Lourdes Hospital in Binghamton. Police released a statement that day: "The victim and male student had a previous domestic/romantic relationship. The investigation determined that the person of interest had left the United States by an international air travel flight, prior to the discovery of Haley Anderson's deceased body."

On Sunday, March 11, Tercero was officially named as a suspect by the Binghamton Police Department, which also stated that Tercero fled to Nicaragua. The Broome County District Attorney, Steve Cornwell, "said his office will be seeking an indictment from a grand jury in the case, and after one is granted, will file a warrant for Tercero's arrest. According to Cornwell, the warrant will be presented to the U.S. Department of State, and his office will call on the Nicaraguan government to extradite Tercero."

Monday classes were cancelled for senior nursing students in the wake of Anderson's death. Also on Monday, March 12, University President Harvey Stenger and Decker School of Nursing Dean Mario Ortiz released statements mourning Anderson's death and extending condolences to her friends and family.

Tercero was apprehended by the Nicaraguan National Police on Tuesday, March 13 at the Hospital de Leon. He had entered the country on Friday, March 9 at 3:55 pm. Tercero attempted suicide after killing Anderson and was placed in a psychiatric hospital upon arrival in Nicaragua. After Tercero was arrested at the hospital, he was taken to the Directorate of Judicial Assistance, also known as El Chipote, in Managua.

In Broome County on March 17, Tercero was charged with second-degree murder, which meant he could face up to life in prison if convicted. The Broome County District Attorney also officially released a warrant for Tercero's arrest. Additionally, District Attorney Cornwell publicly released the information that Anderson's roommates initially found her unresponsive in Tercero's Oak Street apartment. They were concerned about Anderson and searched for her; once they found her they called 9-1-1 which triggered the police's welfare check and investigation.

=== Trial, conviction, and extradition attempts ===
In Nicaragua, Tercero was charged with femicide, making his first court appearance in September 2019. Tercero was convicted of femicide and faced 25 to 30 years in a Nicaraguan prison. He was eventually sentenced to 30 years, and his appeal to reduce his sentence was rejected in March 2020. He still faces a second-degree murder charge in Broome County, New York, should a future Broome County district attorney choose to seek extradition when Tercero has completed his 30 years of incarceration in the Nicaraguan prison system.
