= Kriegman =

Kriegman is a surname. Notable persons with this name include:

- Carolyn Kriegman, American jewellery maker
- David Kriegman, American engineer
- Daniel Kriegman, American psychoanalyst
- Mitchell Kriegman (born 1952), American television show maker, writer, director, producer, consultant, story editor, author, composer and actor
