= BPD =

BPD may refer to:

== Medical ==
- Biliopancreatic diversion
- Borderline personality disorder
  - Not to be confused with bipolar disorder
- Brief psychotic disorder
- Bronchopulmonary dysplasia

== Organizations ==
- Bharat Punarnirman Dal, a national political party of India
- Birla Institute of Technology and Science, Pilani – Dubai Campus
- Bombrini-Parodi-Delfino, an Italian chemical firm that existed from 1912 to 1968
- Brunei Prison Department

=== Law enforcement ===
- Bakersfield Police Department
- Baltimore Police Department
- Bellevue Police Department (Washington)
- Bellingham Police Department
- Berkeley Police Department
- Binghamton Police Department
- Boise Police Department
- Boston Police Department
- Bradenton Police Department
- Brea Police Department

== Other uses ==
- BPD (car), British cyclecar manufactured in 1913
- Bank Pembangunan Daerah, a term for Indonesian regional development banks
- Barrel per day, a unit of oil production rate commonly used in a regions or countries using the oil barrel of 42 US gallons
- Biocidal Products Directive, European Union directive 98/8/EC
- Building Performance Database, a database maintained by the Lawrence Berkeley National Laboratory for the US Department of Energy
- Business Process Diagram, the process diagram used in Business Process Model and Notation
