= Hertz Foundation =

American nonprofit foundation awarding fellowships in the sciences

Fannie and John Hertz Foundation
- Founded: 1957
- Founder: Fannie and John D. Hertz
- Purpose: Applied science, mathematics, and engineering
- Location: Livermore, California, U.S.
- Region served: United States
- Method: Ph.D. Fellowships
- Key people: Wendy Connors, President; Stephen D. Fantone, Ph.D., Chairman of the Board; Philip Welkhoff, Ph.D., Senior Fellowship Interviewer
- Revenue: $5,055,682 (2018)
- Expenses: $4,364,123 (2018)
- Website: hertzfoundation.org

The Fannie and John Hertz Foundation is an American non-profit organization that awards fellowships to PhD students in the applied physical and biological sciences, mathematics, and engineering. Hertz Fellows are selected at the beginning of their careers for their potential to lead the advancement of science and technology through innovation. The fellowship begins with up to $250,000 of financial support over five years of graduate study, granting flexibility and the ability to pursue their own interests, as well as mentoring from alumni fellows. In addition to funding, fellows receive distinctive opportunities throughout their lives, including events, mentoring, and professional and scholarly support as members of the Hertz Fellows Community. Fellows pledge to make their skills available to the United States in times of national emergency. Membership as a Hertz Fellow is for life.

== Hertz Fellowship ==
=== History ===
==== Cold War origins ====
In 1957, during the Cold War era, Jewish-Hungarian emigrant John D. Hertz established the Fannie and John Hertz Foundation with the purpose of supporting bright young minds in the applied sciences. In the political climate of the time with the space race between the United States and the Soviet Union, Hertz's intentions in making this significant contribution towards American scientific excellence were specifically anti-communist. For his significant contribution to the security of the US, Hertz received the highest civilian award given by the Department of Defense in 1958.

==== Pivot to graduate-level research ====
Initially, the foundation granted undergraduate scholarships to qualified and financially limited mechanical and electrical engineering students. In 1963, the undergraduate scholarship program was phased out and replaced with postgraduate fellowships leading to the award of the PhD The scope of the studies supported by the fellowships was also enlarged to include applied sciences and other engineering disciplines. The intellectual freedom granted by the fellowship was intended to foster "a cross-generational community of research leaders and entrepreneurs." The degree to which this lofty goal has been a success can perhaps be judged by its alumni. Hertz fellows include "Nobel Laureates, CEOs, generals, and best-selling authors."

==== Breadth of alumni reach ====
With a coterie of some 1,300 recipients over the fellowship's tenure, "[c]onnections among fellows over the years have sparked collaborations in startups, research, and technology commercialization." With a ceiling approaching $250,000 for fellowship grants, the fellowship is highly competitive. In recent years, respected universities like Case Western Reserve have initiated companion grants to full fund finalists connected with their institutions with full funding in situations in which they are not selected for the final prize, in testament to the quality of those making applications to the Hertz Foundation.

=== Selection process ===
As of 2024, following a "highly selective" interview process, the Hertz Foundation narrows its field of candidates to approximately 50 finalists for fellowships in applied science, mathematics and engineering. "Recipients must display high academic achievement and the capacity to contribute to the advancement of knowledge in their field."

15 to 20 of those finalists are named Hertz Fellows and receive up to five years of graduate school funding.

=== Competitiveness ===
Hertz Fellowships are highly competitive. For the 2017–2018 academic year, nearly 800 applicants applied for 10 spots, giving it an acceptance rate of 1.5%. Since 1960, the foundation has made awards to more than 1,300 fellows, with (as of 2022) 309 fellows affiliated with the Massachusetts Institute of Technology; 255 with Stanford University; 104 with the University of California, Berkeley; 95 with the California Institute of Technology; and 76 with Harvard University. These top five universities account for nearly two-thirds of all fellows.

Institution	Fellows (1960-2022)
MIT	309
Stanford	255
Berkeley	104
Caltech	95
Harvard	76

=== Notable fellows ===
- Dario Amodei, Co-founder and CEO of Anthropic
- Lars Bildsten, Director, Kavli Institute for Theoretical Physics at University of California, Santa Barbara
- Manjul Bhargava, Fields Medalist 2014
- Eric Boe, NASA astronaut
- Gregory S. Boebinger, physicist, Florida State University
- Stephen P. Boyd, Professor of Electrical Engineering at Stanford University
- Ed Boyden, 2016 Breakthrough Prize
- James E. Brau
- Mung Chiang, President of Purdue University
- Isaac Chuang, quantum computing pioneer
- Kevin M. Esvelt
- Doyne Farmer, an originator of econophysics
- Alex Filippenko, Richard & Rhoda Goldman Distinguished Professor in the Physical Sciences and Professor of Astronomy at the University of California, Berkeley
- Kathleen Fisher, Deputy Director at DARPA's Information Innovation Office and Adjunct Professor of Computer Science at Tufts University
- Alice P. Gast, President, Imperial College of London
- Kenneth M. Golden, fellow of Explorers Club
- Jeff Gore, physicist and ecologist, Massachusetts Institute of Technology
- Leonidas J. Guibas, researcher in computational geometry and Paul Pigott Professor of Computer Science and Electrical Engineering at Stanford University
- Nathan Lewis, professor, California Institute of Technology
- Kevin Karplus, professor, University of California, Santa Cruz
- David Kriegman, researcher in computer vision and Professor of Computer Science at University of California, San Diego
- Peter Hagelstein, Inventor, X-ray laser
- Danny Hillis, Inventor, entrepreneur, and author
- Tianhui Michael Li, first Data Scientist in residence at Andreessen Horowitz, founder of The Data Incubator
- Po-Shen Loh, Coach of USA International Mathematical Olympiad Team and Professor of Mathematics at Carnegie Mellon University
- Derek Lidow, Founder of iSuppli Corp.
- John C. Mather, Nobel Laureate 2006
- Richard Miles, aerospace engineer
- Nathan Myhrvold, Founder, Intellectual Ventures, former CTO, Microsoft
- Dianne P. O'Leary, applied mathematician
- Sabrina Pasterski, Young Physicist
- General Ellen M. Pawlikowski, Commander, Air Force Material Command
- Emma Pierson, Assistant Professor of Computer Science at the University of California, Berkeley
- Joseph Polchinski, Fundamental Physics Prize 2017
- William H. Press, Former Deputy Director for Science and Technology, Los Alamos National Laboratory
- Robert Sedgewick, William O. Baker Professor in Computer Science at Princeton University
- Katelin Schutz
- Kenneth L Shepard
- Alfred Spector, CTO of Two Sigma and former VP of Research at Google
- Rich C. Staats, Commanding General, United States Army Reserve Innovation Command
- Robert Tarjan, Turing Award 1986
- Astro Teller, Director, Google X
- Michael Telson, Former CFO at the Department of Energy
- Lee T. Todd, Jr., Entrepreneur, past president of the University of Kentucky
- Christian Wentz, electrical engineer & entrepreneur
- Carl Wieman, Nobel Laureate 2001
- Ned Wingreen
- Jim Roskind, National Cyber Security Hall of Fame 2024
- Avideh Zakhor, Professor Emerita of Electrical Engineering, UC Berkeley

In 2018, some 30 Hertz Fellows were recognized by MIT Technology Review, Forbes, the Howard Hughes Medical Institute, National Academy of Sciences and many others for outstanding work in their respective fields.

== Thesis Prize ==
The Hertz Foundation requires that each fellow furnish the foundation a copy of his or her doctoral dissertation upon receiving the PhD The foundation's Thesis Prize Committee examines the PhD dissertations for their overall excellence and pertinence to high-impact applications of the physical sciences. Each Thesis Prize winner receives an honorarium of $5,000.
