= Zurek (surname) =

Zurek is a surname. Żurek is the Polish variant (the name is spelled the same as the diminutive of żur, a cold rye soup). Žůrek is a Czech variant. Notable people with the surname include:

== Zurek ==
- Eva Zurek (born 1976), Polish-born scientist
- Kathryn Zurek (fl. from 2009), American physicist
- Natasza Zurek (born 1978), Polish-born Canadian snowboarder
- Patrick Zurek (born 1948), American Catholic prelate
- Teresa Zurek (born 1998), German racewalker
- Wojciech H. Zurek (born 1951), Polish and American physicist

== Żurek ==
- Bartosz Żurek (born 1993), Polish footballer
- Damian Żurek (born 1999), Polish speed skater
- Jan Żurek (born 1956), Polish football manager
- Karol Żurek (born 1949), Polish ice hockey player
- Lesław Żurek (born 1979), Polish actor
- Michał Żurek (born 1988), Polish volleyball player
- Stanisław Żurek (artist) (1926–1996), Polish artist
- Stanisław Żurek (pilot) (1911–1979), Polish pilot
- Waldemar Żurek (born 1970), Polish politician, lawyer and former judge

== Žůrek ==
- Libor Žůrek (born 1979), Czech footballer

== See also ==
- Teresa Román Vélez (Teresita Román de Zurek, 1925–2021), Colombian writer and chef
