= East Side, Binghamton =

Coordinates: 42°6′29″N 75°53′0″W

East Side
- City of Binghamton neighborhood
- Interactive map of East Side
- Country: United States of America
- State: New York
- County: Broome County
- City: Binghamton
- ZIP code: 13904
- Area code: 607
- Website: http://www.cityofbinghamton.com

The East Side, as the name implies, is a neighborhood in the eastern section of the New York State city of Binghamton. It is primarily an urban residential neighborhood with retail along Court and Robinson streets and pockets of industry scattered along the train tracks.

The East Side can be defined as encompassing the area north of the Susquehanna River, east of the Brandywine Highway (NY-7), downtown and the North Side, west of the town of Kirkwood and south of the Quickway, (NY-17)/(I-81).

The area's "main drag" is Court Street which runs just north of the Norfolk Southern tracks and the Susquehanna River. It connects the Eastside directly to Downtown Binghamton and Kirkwood. It has a number of restaurants, gas stations, services, and light industries.

The area's secondary thoroughfare is Robinson Street. The Cameo Theater is a New York State landmark located on Robinson Street on the East Side. Located on that street are three churches: a baptist, Methodist, and East Side Congregational Church. The Congregational Church doubled in size in the 1910s.

The New York State Inebriate Asylum, located just west of the Kirkwood Town Line at the foot of Robinson Street, is a National Historic Landmark that was the first health facility to treat alcoholism as a disease.

The neighborhood became "blighted" in the early 21st century. A planned commercial redevelopment was canceled in 2017.
