= Zurek =

Zurek may refer to:

- Sour cereal soup (żurek), a Slavic traditional soup
- Zurek (surname), a surname, and Polish variant Żurek, and Czech variant Žůrek, including a list of people with the name
- Żurek (film), a 2003 Polish film
