= Richard Miles =

Richard Miles may refer to:

- Richard Miles (aerospace engineer)
- Richard Miles (diplomat) (born 1937), US diplomat
- Richard Miles (historian) (born 1969), British historian and archaeologist
- Richard Miles (Tswana catechist), Motswana (Tswana) catechist and preacher in South Africa
- Richard Pius Miles (1791–1860), Roman Catholic bishop of Nashville
- Dick Miles (1925–2010), American table tennis player
- Richard Miles, pen name of Gerald Richard Perreau-Saussine, better known as American child actor Peter Miles (1938–2002)

== See also ==
- Rick Miles, Canadian politician
