= Rich David =

American politician

Richard C. David

Mayor of Binghamton, New York
- In office January 1, 2014 – December 31, 2021
- Preceded by: Matthew T. Ryan
- Succeeded by: Jared M. Kraham

Personal details
- Born: May 14, 1976 (age 50) Pittsford, New York, U.S.
- Party: Republican
- Education: Allendale Columbia School
- Alma mater: St. John Fisher College (BA); Binghamton University (MPA)

Richard Claude "Rich" David (born May 14, 1976) is an American politician and journalist. He served as the mayor of Binghamton, New York from 2014 to 2021. He ran for the 52rd district of the New York State Senate in 2022.

== Education and early career ==
David graduated from Allendale Columbia School in 1994. He then attended St. John Fisher College where he studied communications and political science. While at St. John Fisher College, David worked as a production intern at a local television station.

In 1998, David moved to Binghamton to start his career in journalism as a general assignment reporter for WBNG-TV. While covering local politics, he met then-Mayor Richard A. Bucci and became interested in public service. In 2000, Bucci appointed David as City Hall's Director of Community Relations, a position in the Mayor's Office that handled public information, media relations and constituent communications.

In 2002, David received his Master of Public Administration from Binghamton University while working at City Hall.

In 2004, David was appointed Deputy Mayor, a position that provides professional support and advises the Mayor in all matters related to the daily operation of city government. In 2006, David left local government as the term-limited Bucci administration came to an end. He was hired as public affairs officer at SUNY Broome Community College.

In 2008, David and his development firm Confluence Enterprises completed work restoring a historic downtown Binghamton building into a loft apartment where David now resides, investing $250,000 in the revitalization effort. In subsequent years, Confluence Enterprises has invested in various real estate holdings and businesses in Binghamton.

== Mayoral campaigns ==
=== 2009 ===
David first ran for Mayor of Binghamton in 2009, attempting to unseat incumbent Matthew T. Ryan. In the general election, David ran on the Republican and Conservative lines against Ryan, who ran on the Democratic and Working Families Party lines, and third-party candidate Douglas Walter Drazen. David came in second place in the three-way race.

Binghamton, New York Mayoral Election, 2009
| Party | Candidate | Votes | % | ±% |
|---|---|---|---|---|
| Democratic | Matthew Ryan | 3,660 | 36.0% | N/A |
| Working Families | Matthew Ryan | 406 | 4.0% | N/A |
| Total | Matthew Ryan | 4,006 | 40.0% | N/A |
| Republican | Rich David | 3,589 | 35.4% | N/A |
| Conservative | Rich David | 366 | 3.6% | N/A |
| Total | Rich David | 3,955 | 38.9% | N/A |
| Independence | Douglas Walter Drazen | 2,059 | 20.3% | N/A |
| Turnout | | 10,157 | | N/A |

=== 2013 ===
In 2013, four years after he had lost to Ryan, David again ran for Mayor of Binghamton. In the Republican primary, David received 939 votes—61 percent—beating challengers Douglas Walter Drazen with 433 votes and Edward Hickey with 164 votes. In the general election, David beat Democratic Binghamton City Councilwoman Teri Rennia by 6.79% and was elected Mayor of Binghamton.

Binghamton, New York Mayoral Election, 2013
| Party | Candidate | Votes | % | ±% |
|---|---|---|---|---|
| Republican | Richard C. David | 4,206 | 47.02 | N/A |
| Democratic | Teri Rennia | 4,074 | 45.54 | N/A |
| Conservative | Richard C. David | 666 | 7.44 | N/A |
| Turnout | | 8,946 | | N/A |

=== 2017 ===
In 2017, Rich David ran on the Republican, Conservative, and Independence lines for reelection as Mayor of Binghamton. He was challenged by former Deputy Mayor Tarik Abdelazim, who ran on the Democratic and Working Families lines.

Binghamton, New York Mayoral Election, 2017
| Party | Candidate | Votes | % | ±% |
|---|---|---|---|---|
| Republican | Richard C. David | 5,134 | 58.91 | TBD |
| Democratic | Tarik Abdelazim | 3,572 | 40.99 | TBD |
| Turnout | | 8,175 | | TBD |

== Mayoralty ==
David was sworn into office as Mayor of Binghamton on January 1, 2014.

=== Law enforcement ===
One of David's major campaign promises was to increase the number of officers in the Binghamton Police Department which had been cut by 14 percent during the Ryan administration. David restored seven officers in his first year in office.

=== Infrastructure ===
In 2014, Binghamton's $7 million infrastructure plan improved more than 11 center line miles of city streets. In 2015, city was set to receive 15 miles of street improvements as part of a $8 million plan.

In 2015, David initiated a $4 million plan to convert the city's roughly 7,000 streetlights to LED technology.

=== Budget management ===
As part of David's push for municipal budget stability, his first budget included a 0.48 percent residential property tax increase, the second-lowest increase in 17 years.

== See also ==
- List of mayors of Binghamton, New York
