= Libous =

Libous is a surname. Notable people with the surname include:

- Al Libous (1928–2016), American politician
- Thomas W. Libous (1953–2016), American politician
