= Abel Bennett =

American politician (1818–1889)

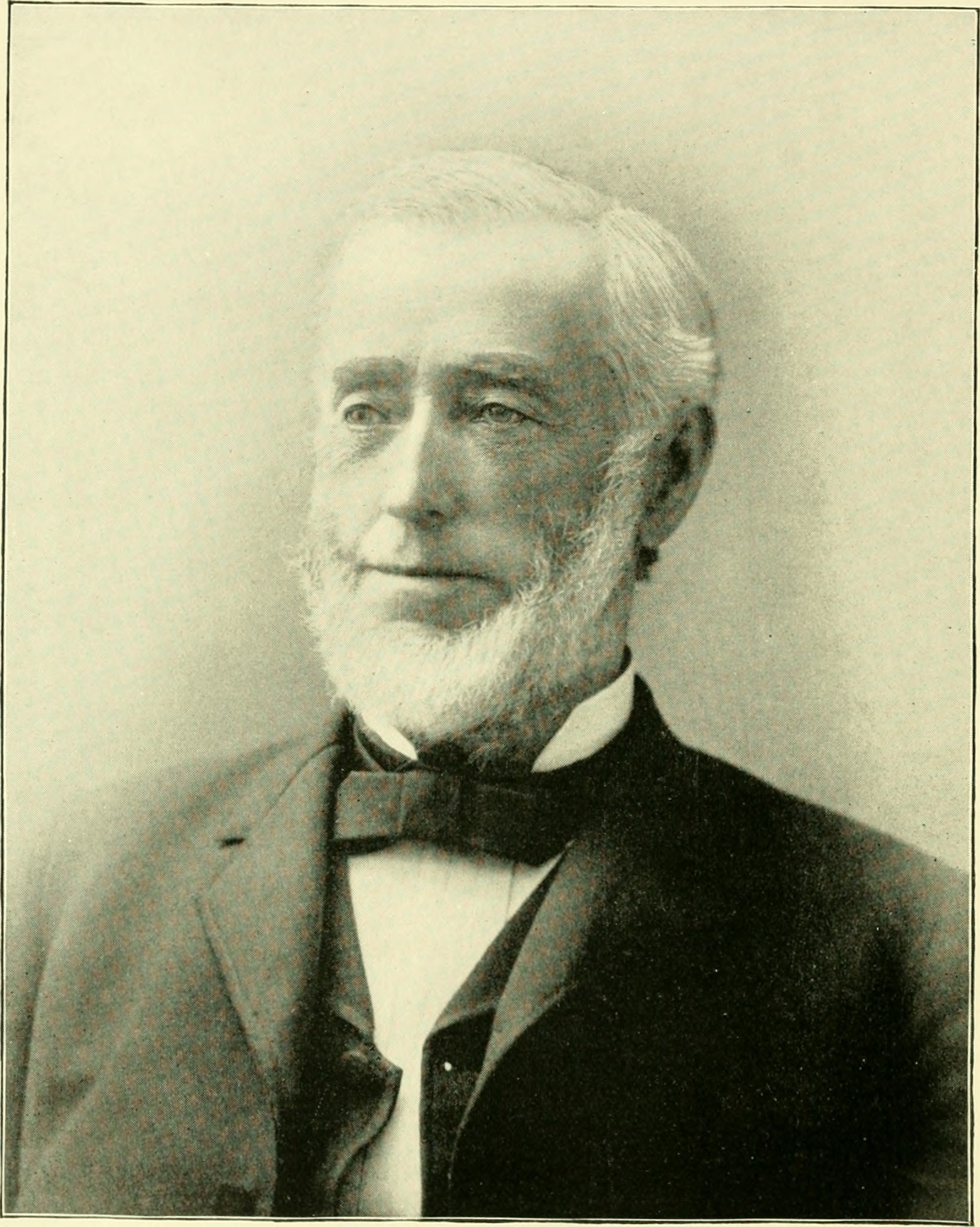

1st Mayor of Binghamton
- In office May 1867 – February 17, 1868
- Preceded by: Erasmus D. Robinson (as Village President)
- Succeeded by: Jabez F. Rice

Personal details
- Born: Abel Bennett; November 16, 1818 Bainbridge, New York, U.S.
- Died: June 11, 1889 (aged 70) Glen Haven, New York, U.S.
- Resting place: Spring Forest Cemetery; Binghamton, New York, U.S.
- Party: Republican
- Spouses: Adelaide Johnson (m. 1847; died 1854); Eugenia Lathrop (m. 1857)
- Children: 3
- Profession: Businessman

Abel Bennett (November 16, 1818 – June 11, 1889) was an American businessman and politician who served as the first mayor of Binghamton, New York from 1867 to 1868.

== Early life and career ==
Abel Bennett was born on November 16, 1818, in Bennettsville, a hamlet in the town of Bainbridge, New York.

Around 1840, Bennett moved to Wilkes-Barre, Pennsylvania and worked as a clerk in a general store. He then moved to nearby Pittston after his employer acquired an interest in a coal company there. While working at the coal company, he developed a concept of using elevators to move coal from the mines to loading areas. The success of this idea allowed Bennett to eventually purchase the Pennsylvania Coal Company.

Following Bennett's time at the Pennsylvania Coal Company, he moved to New York City and became a partner in the dry goods firm of Lathrop, Luddington & Co.

=== Move to Binghamton ===
Bennett moved to Binghamton, New York in 1859 and settled on a farm that was located west of the village boundaries in what is now Binghamton's West Side. While in Binghamton, he became active in the business community. The First National Bank of Binghamton began business in January 1864 with Bennett as its founding president.

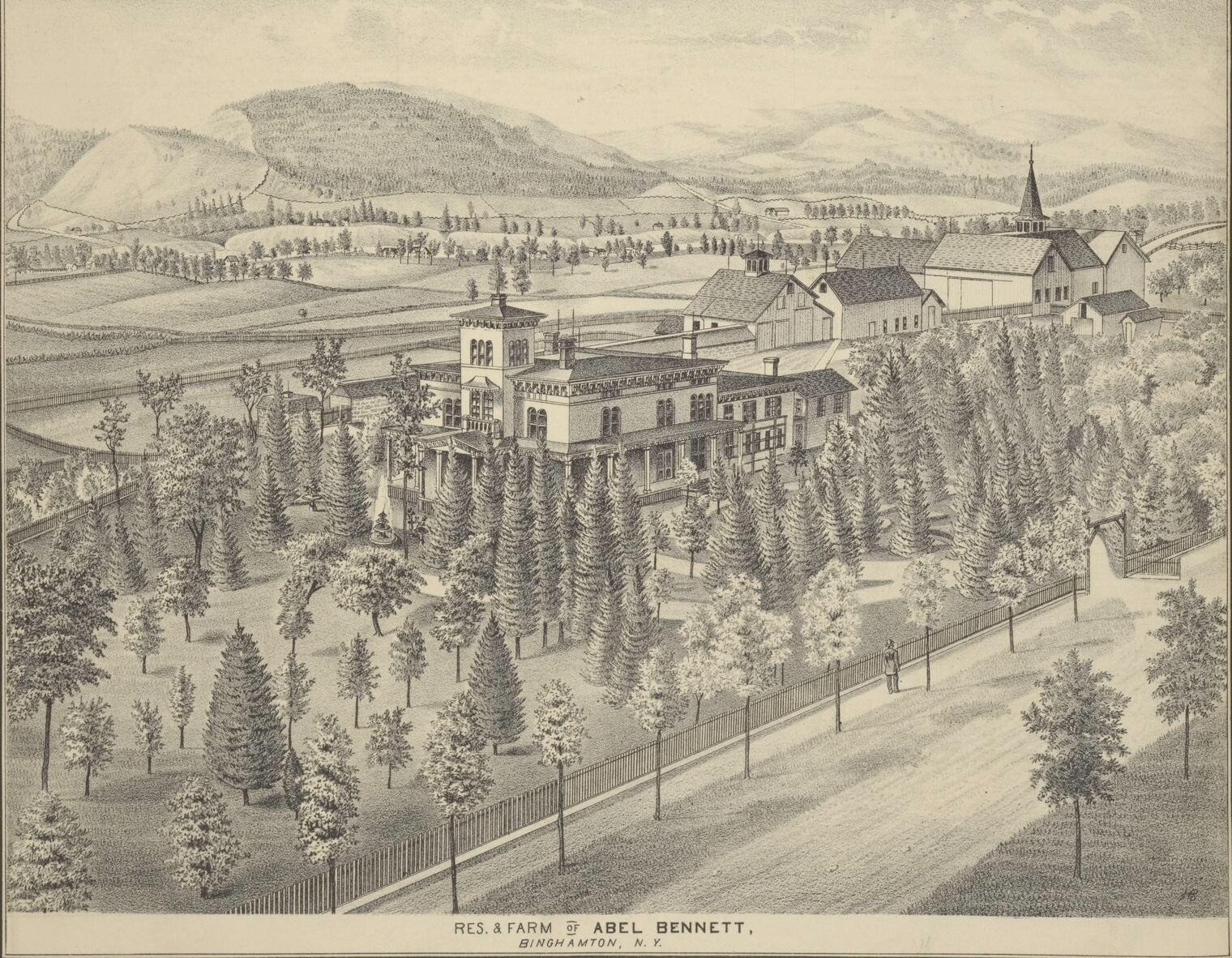
Abel Bennett’s residence and farm in Binghamton

Binghamton was incorporated as a city in April 1867 and Bennett won election as the city's first mayor. Under the city's original charter, mayors were elected for a one-year term. Bennett's term as mayor ended on February 17, 1868.

After serving as mayor, Bennett developed property on Washington Street which became known as the Bennett Block. In 1877, he constructed the Bennett Hotel. The hotel was designed by architect Isaac Perry.

== Later life and death ==
By the late 1880s, Bennett's health began to fail and he decided to downsize his farm. He subdivided his land into what is now the Abel Bennett Tract Historic District.

Bennett died on June 11, 1889.

== See also ==
- Abel Bennett Tract Historic District
