= Court Street Bridge (Binghamton) =

Coordinates: 42°5′55.5″N 75°54′58.39″W

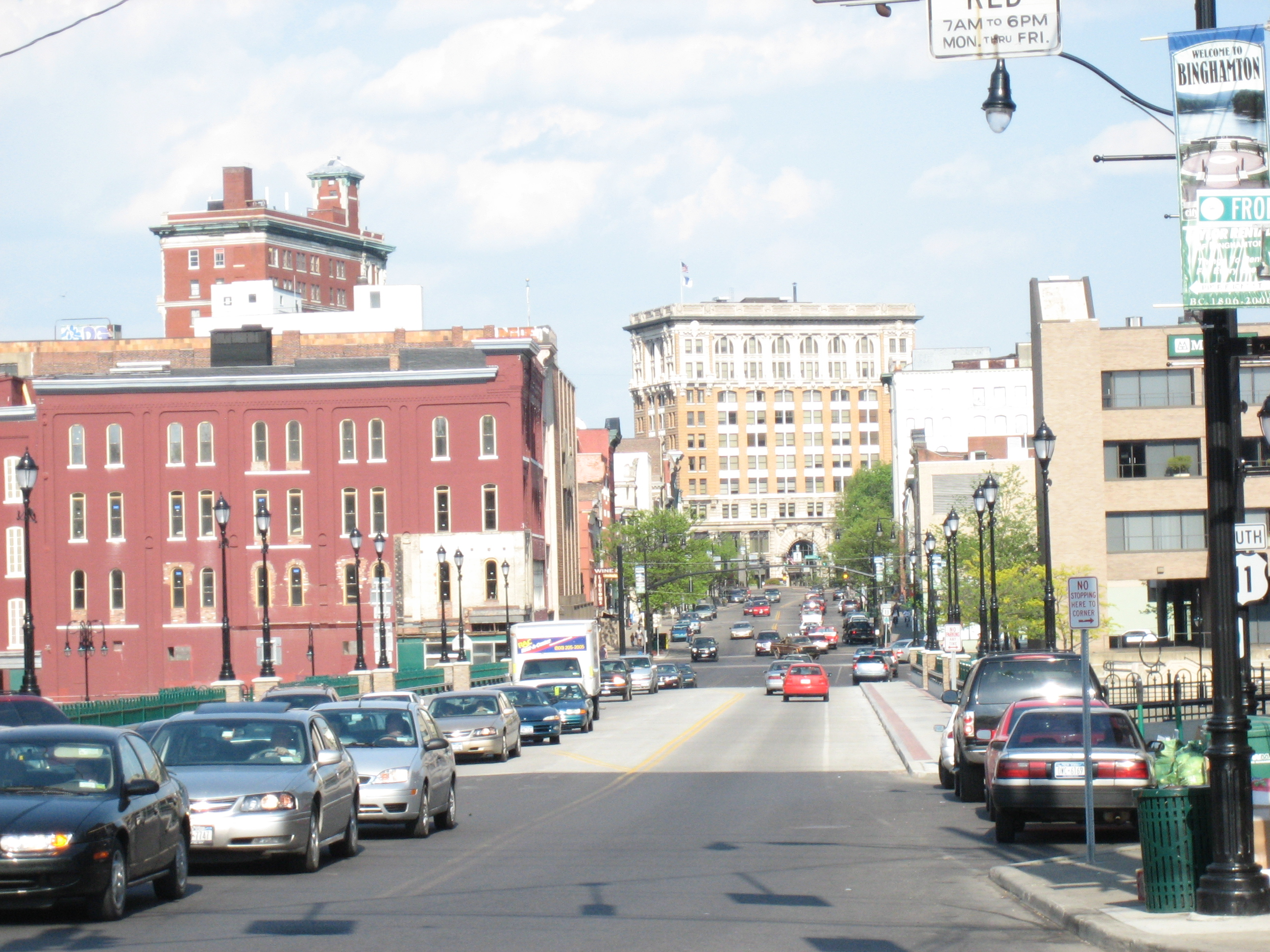
Court Street Bridge as seen from the intersection of Main and Front streets

The Court Street Bridge is a combined motor vehicle and pedestrian crossing which spans the Chenango River in the New York State city of Binghamton. The bridge carries U.S. Route 11 and connects Court Street and Downtown Binghamton with Main Street and its West Side neighborhood.

== History ==
The first bridge spanning the Chenango River at Court Street was a toll bridge completed in 1808. It stands nearby the Susquehanna River on the land originally purchased by the Philadelphia actuary William Bingham. Shortly after the Sullivan Expedition occurred, William's nephew moved from Britain to settle the Confluence of the Chenango & Susquehanna, receiving the charter for the bridge on 6 April 1805, paying $25,000 for the total construction.
