= West Side, Binghamton =

Coordinates: 42°6′25″N 75°56′13″W

West Side
- City of Binghamton neighborhood
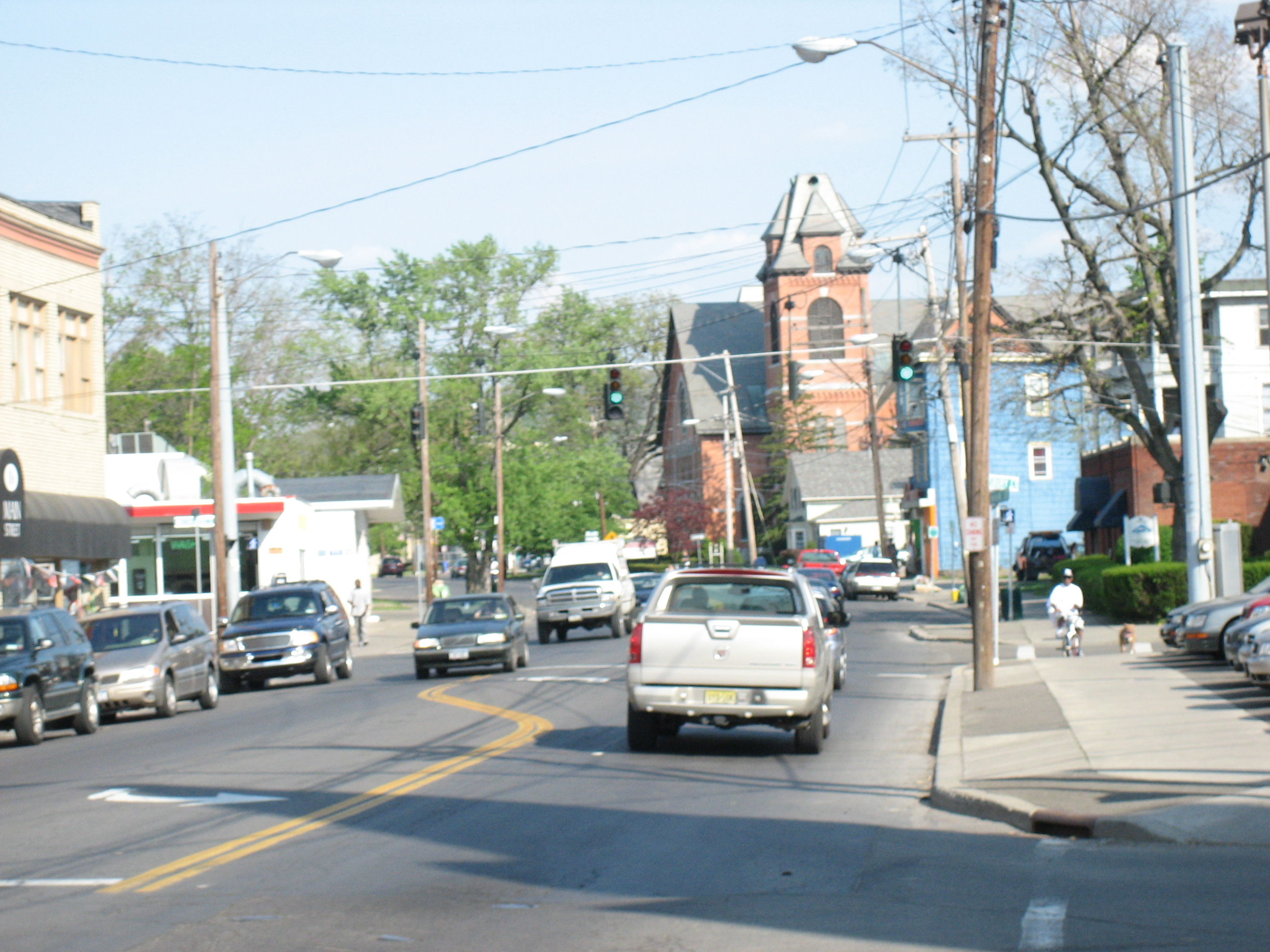
- Looking east along Main Street on its course through the West Side, May 2007

- Location within New York Location within the United States
- Country: United States of America
- State: New York
- County: Broome County
- City: Binghamton

Government
  - City Council Members: Martin J. Gerchman (D) 2nd District, Teri Rennia (D) 3rd District
  - County Council Members: Timothy P. Cleary (D) 2nd District, Joseph S. Sanfilippo (D) 4th District
- Time zone: Eastern Time Zone (North America)
- United States ZIP Code: 13905
- Area code: 607
- Website: http://www.cityofbinghamton.com

The West Side, as the name implies, is a neighborhood in the western section of the New York State city of Binghamton. It is primarily an urban residential neighborhood with retail along Main Street and pockets of industrial buildings along the train tracks.

The West Side, can be defined as encompassing the area north of the Susquehanna River, east of the neighboring village of Johnson City along Margaret Street and Floral Avenue, west of the Chenango River and south of the Norfolk Southern tracks.

The area's "main drag" is Main Street which carries NY-17C. It runs from the foot of the Court Street Bridge west and into Johnson City. It is lined with retail, consisting of several large supermarkets, churches, pharmacies, bank branches, a few bars and restaurants as well as a few mom and pop shops. Other important streets in the neighborhood are Riverside Drive, Front Street which carries US-11, Leroy Street, Grand Boulevard and Floral Avenue.

The West Side is home to Lourdes Memorial Hospital, Recreation Park, Binghamton High School, Seton Catholic Central, and St. Patrick's Church. Recreation Park and the area south of it are part of the Abel Bennett Tract Historic District.

The American Civic Association, on Front Street, was the site of the Binghamton shooting, where 13 people were killed by a shooter before he committed suicide.

Apart from commercial Main Street and some industrial buildings one block north of it along the Norfolk Southern tracks, the West Side of Binghamton is primarily an urban residential neighborhood. The housing stock ranges from small to large, detached, single and double-family houses to attached row-houses and larger apartment buildings. Generally, the area south of Main Street towards Riverside Drive and the Susquehanna River is inhabited mainly by people of lower middle to upper-class. The area north of Main Street is inhabited by people of a lower income. Many college students also live in the area south of Main Street near/around Recreation Park.

== Notable residents ==
- Richard Deacon, actor
- Darlanne Fluegel, actress
- Rod Serling, film maker, creator of The Twilight Zone
