= Al Libous =

American politician

Mayor of Binghamton, New York
- In office 1969–1981
- Preceded by: Joseph Esworthy
- Succeeded by: Juanita Crabb

Personal details
- Born: September 24, 1928
- Died: June 30, 2016 (aged 87)
- Party: Republican
- Spouse: Debra Libous

Alfred J. "Al" Libous (September 24, 1928 – June 30, 2016) was an American politician who served as the Mayor of Binghamton, New York for three consecutive terms from 1969 until 1981.

== Biography ==
Libous began his political as a Binghamton City Council, representing the city's North Side. He was first elected Mayor of Binghamton in November 1968. He ultimately served three consecutive, four-year terms as Mayor from 1969 until 1981.

Libous greatest challenge as mayor was the decline of the both city's downtown business district, as well as the continued loss of population to the suburbs. In particular, the opening of the Oakdale Mall in Johnson City lured retail stores and consumers away from Downtown Binghamton during the 1970s and 1980s. In response, Libous tried to persuade a Canadian developer to construct downtown, but the deal fell through after negotiations and several false starts. The failure of the development led to a further decline of downtown businesses. (The present-day MetroCenter now stands on the same site as the proposed development).

Mayor Libous and the city government were also unable to stop Binghamton's demographic decline during the 1970s and 1980s, despite their efforts to revitalize the downtown and lure new business developments. The population of Binghamton had already declined 20% from 81,000 in 1949 to 64,000 residents by the time Libous took office as mayor in 1969. The flight to the suburbs, such as Chenango and Vestal, continued throughout the 1970s, posing huge logistical challenges to the city and the Libous administration. Binghamton's population dropped to 56,000 by the time Libous left office in the early 1980s.

Libous is believed to have been one of the first politicians from the Southern Tier to host his own radio show. For years, he co-hosted a talk show with his friend and political rival, Walt Fedorich, a Democratic city councilman who represented Binghamton's First Ward.

In 1974, Libous ran for the U.S. House of Representatives from New York's 27th congressional district, which included Binghamton at the time. However, Libous was defeated in the general election by Matt McHugh, a Democrat, in the 1974 general election McHugh placed first with 83,562 votes, defeating Libous, who garnered 68,273 votes. Libous also made an unsuccessful bid for County Executive of Broome County, New York, but lost the Republican primary election to Carl Young.

Libous did not seek re-election in 1981 and retired as Mayor after three terms in office. He was succeeded by Democrat Juanita Crabb, who won the mayoral election on November 3, 1981, to become the city's first female mayor.

Throughout the rest of his life, Libous was referred to as "Uncle Al" in local political circles, in reference to his nephew, State Sen. Thomas W. Libous, who represented the area in the New York State Senate from 1989 until 2015.

Al Libous died on June 30, 2016, at the age of 88. His nephew, former state Senator Thomas W. Libous also died on May 3, 2016.

== See also ==
- List of mayors of Binghamton, New York
