= Gregory S. Boebinger =

American physicist

Gregory Scott Boebinger was the director of the National High Magnetic Field Laboratory in Tallahassee, Florida, and is currently a professor of physics at Florida State University.

== Biography ==
Boebinger was born June 29, 1959, in Cincinnati, Ohio, one of four sons of a minister and an elementary school teacher. He is a 1977 graduate of North Central High School in Indianapolis. He married his high-school sweetheart; they have three children.

He simultaneously earned three bachelor's degrees - in physics, philosophy, and electrical engineering - from Purdue University in 1981. With a Churchill Scholarship, he traveled to the Cambridge University for one year of research under Professor Sir Richard Friend, studying the temperature-dependent structural changes in one-dimensional organic superconductors.

His 1986 doctorate in physics came from the Massachusetts Institute of Technology. There, he held Compton and Hertz Foundation fellowships. His work involved experiments with high-powered magnets at the MIT Francis Bitter Magnet Laboratory, and it was there he became a graduate assistant for two scientists who would later win the 1998 Nobel Prize in Physics: Horst Ludwig Störmer, then of Bell Laboratories, and Daniel Tsui, then a professor at Princeton University. His thesis research utilized high magnetic fields and ultra-low temperatures to study fractional quantum Hall effect. He spent a year as a NATO Postdoctoral Fellow in Paris at the Ecole Normale Supérieure studying other quantum behaviors of electrons in quantum wells.

In 1987, Boebinger joined the research staff at Bell Laboratories and established a unique pulsed magnetic field facility for physics research on semiconductors, f-electron compounds, and superconductors in magnetic fields up to 60 teslas. For this research, he was named a Fellow of the American Physical Society in 1996.

In 1998, Boebinger became head of the Pulsed Field Facility at Los Alamos National Laboratory, one of the three campuses of the National High Magnetic Field Laboratory. There he continued his research on high-temperature superconductors, using intensely pulsed magnetic fields to suppress superconductivity. He also did a stint as deputy director for Science Programs in the Division of Material Science and Technology.

In 2004, he moved to Florida State University to become director of the Magnet Lab, with responsibility for the lab's programs at all three campuses: Florida State University, Los Alamos National Laboratory, and the University of Florida. His research has focused on high-temperature superconductivity and other phenomena associated with electron correlations. He has given more than 340 invited talks and colloquia around the world, both about his research and about the many facets of high magnetic field research that advance frontiers in physics, materials science, engineering, chemistry, biochemistry, and biomedicine.

On April 13, 2023, it was announced by Florida State University that he would be stepping down from his position as the director of the National High Magnetic Field Laboratory. A replacement for this position has yet to be announced.

== Honors and awards ==
Member of:

- American Academy of Arts and Sciences (2017)
- U. S. National Academy of Sciences (April 2021)

Fellow of:

- American Association for the Advancement of Science
- American Physical Society
- Fannie and John Hertz Foundation (MIT)
- Karl Taylor Compton Foundation (MIT)
- Winston Churchill Foundation
- NATO Postdoctoral Fellowship (École Normale Supérieure)
- Distinguished Science Alumnus: Purdue University School of Science
