= List of mayors of Binghamton, New York =

Mayor of the City of Binghamton
- Incumbent; Jared M. Kraham since January 1, 2022
- Style: The Honorable (formal); Mr. Mayor (informal)
- Seat: Binghamton City Hall
- Term length: Four years; renewable once
- Constituting instrument: Binghamton City Charter
- Inaugural holder: Abel Bennett
- Formation: 1867
- Deputy: Deputy Mayor of Binghamton
- Salary: $77,350 (2025)
- Website: www.binghamton-ny.gov/government/elected-officials/office-of-the-mayor

The following is a list of people who have served as mayor of the city of Binghamton in the U.S. state of New York.

== List of mayors ==
No.	Name (birth–death)	Term	Party	Election	Profession (Note: Prior to entering office)
1	Abel Bennett (1818–1889)	c. May 1867 – February 17, 1868	Republican	1867	Bank president
2	Jabez F. Rice (b. 1817)	February 18, 1868 – February 15, 1869	Democratic	1868	Businessman
3	Job N. Congdon	February 16, 1869 – February 20, 1871	Republican	1869 1870	Businessman
4	Walton Dwight (d. 1878)	February 21, 1871 – February 19, 1872	Republican	1871	Hotel owner
5	Sherman D. Phelps (1814–1878)	February 20, 1872 – February 17, 1873	Republican	1872	Bank president
6	Benjamin N. Loomis	February 18, 1873 – February 16, 1874	Democratic	1873	Attorney; Vice President of Chenango Valley Savings Bank
7	Delancey M. Halbert	February 17, 1874 – February 15, 1875	Republican	1874	Businessman
8	Charles McKinney	February 16, 1875 – February 14, 1876	Republican	1875	Businessman
9	John Rankin (c. 1835–1904)	February 15, 1876 – February 19, 1877	Democratic	1876	Landowner; investor; accountant
10	Charles Butler (c. 1831–1901)	February 20, 1877 – February 17, 1879	Democratic	1877 1878	Businessman
11	James H. Bartlett	February 18, 1879 – February 16, 1880	Republican	1879	Post office chief clerk
12	Horace N. Lester (1823–1882)	February 17, 1880 – February 14, 1881	Republican	1880	Businessman
13	Duncan R. Grant (1816–1902)	February 15, 1881 – February 20, 1882	Democratic	1881	Baker; confectioner
14	James K. Welden	February 21, 1882 – February 19, 1883	Democratic	1882	Businessman
15	John S. Wells (c. 1822–1908)	February 20, 1883 – February 18, 1884	Democratic	1883	Contractor
16	George A. Thayer (1830–1887)	February 19, 1884 – February 15, 1886	Democratic	1884 1885	Physician
17	Joseph M. Johnson (1840–1915)	February 16, 1886 – February 14, 1887	Republican	1886	Attorney
18	George C. Bayless (1862–1923)	February 15, 1887 – February 20, 1888	Republican	1887	Businessman
19	Tracy R. Morgan (1817/18–1904)	February 21, 1888 – February 18, 1889	Republican	1888	Bank cashier; treasurer
20	Frank H. Stephens	February 19, 1889 – February 16, 1891	Democratic	1889	Businessman
21	Benajah S. Curran (1837–1907)	February 17, 1891 – February 20, 1893	Democratic	1891	Attorney
22	George E. Green (1858–1917)	February 21, 1893 – December 31, 1897	Republican	1893 1895	Business agent
23	Jerome DeWitt (1845–1934)	January 1, 1898 – December 31, 1901	Democratic	1897 1899	Attorney
24	Samuel L. Smith (1858–1937)	January 1, 1902 – December 31, 1905	Republican	1901 1903	Physician; druggist
25	Hiram H. Woodburn (1866–1941)	January 1, 1906 – December 31, 1907	Republican	1905	Railroad conductor
26	Clarence M. Slauson (1859–1937)	January 1, 1908 – December 31, 1909	Republican	1907	Businessman
27	John J. Irving (1863–1934)	January 1, 1910 – December 31, 1913	Democratic	1909 1911	Attorney
28	William R. Ely (1871–1947)	January 1, 1914 – December 31, 1915	Republican	1913	Bank secretary; treasurer
29	Frank H. Truitt (1873–1955)	January 1, 1916 – December 31, 1917	Republican	1915	Businessman
30	Harry C. Walker (1873–1932)	January 1, 1918 – December 31, 1918	Democratic	1917	Attorney
31	Leroy E. Barnes (1880–1951)	January 1, 1919 – December 31, 1919	Republican	– (Note: Assumed office automatically after the resignation of Harry Walker)	Superintendent at Ansco
32	Thomas A. Wilson (1888/89–1972)	January 1, 1920 – December 31, 1923	Republican	1919 1921	Army officer
33	John A. Giles (1876–1962)	January 1, 1924 – December 31, 1925	Republican	1923	Engineer
34	Clarence J. Cook (1890–1974)	January 1, 1926 – December 31, 1927	Republican (Note: Elected on the Democratic, Citizens, and Socialist tickets)	1925	Businessman
35	Norman A. Boyd (1881–1959)	January 1, 1928 – December 31, 1931	Republican	1927 1929	Businessman
36	Miles M. Smith (1876–1938)	January 1, 1932 – July 31, 1935	Democratic	1931 1933	Dentist
37	James T. Ivory (1886/87–1964)	August 14, 1935 – December 31, 1935	Democratic	– (Note: Appointed by the city council after the resignation of Miles Smith)	Dentist
38	Thomas W. Behan (1876–1954)	January 1, 1936 – December 31, 1937	Republican	1935	Businessman
39	Charles W. Kress (1897–1964)	January 1, 1938 – December 31, 1941	Republican	1937 1939	Civil engineer
40	Fancher M. Hopkins (1883–1943)	January 1, 1942 – September 14, 1943	Democratic	1941	Insurance agent
41	Walker B. Lounsbery (1894/95–1965)	September 24, 1943 – December 31, 1949	Republican	– (Note: Appointed by the city council after the death of Fancher Hopkins) 1943 (special) 1945	Engineer
42	Donald W. Kramer (1907–1986)	January 1, 1950 – December 31, 1957	Democratic	1949 1953	Attorney
43	John J. Burns (1921–2004)	January 1, 1958 – August 9, 1965	Democratic	1957 1961	Clerk
44	William P. Burns (1918/19–1989)	August 9, 1965 – December 31, 1965	Democratic	– (Note: Appointed by the city council after the resignation of John Burns)	Businessman
45	Joseph Esworthy (1925–2002)	January 1, 1966 – December 31, 1969	Republican	1965	Attorney
46	Al Libous (1928–2016)	January 1, 1970 – December 31, 1981	Republican	1969 1973 1977	Businessman
47	Juanita Crabb (b. 1949)	January 1, 1982 – December 31, 1993	Democratic	1981 1985 1989	Teacher
48	Richard A. Bucci (b. 1954)	January 1, 1994 – December 31, 2005	Republican	1993 1997 2001	Political staffer
49	Matthew T. Ryan (b. 1951)	January 1, 2006 – December 31, 2013	Democratic	2005 2009	Attorney
50	Rich David (b. 1976)	January 1, 2014 – December 31, 2021	Republican	2013 2017	Journalist; businessman
51	Jared M. Kraham (b. 1991)	January 1, 2022 –	Republican	2021 2025	Deputy Mayor of Binghamton

== See also ==
- Binghamton City Hall, 1898–1972
- Government Plaza, Binghamton, since 1972
- History of Binghamton, New York
