= Allendale Columbia School =

College prep school in Rochester, New York, US

Coordinates: 43.1180098°N 77.5383724°W

Location
- 519 Allens Creek Rd. Rochester, New York 14618; United States

Information
- Type: Independent, college preparatory school
- Motto: First here, then anywhere.
- Established: 1890; 136 years ago
- Founder: Caroline Milliman and Alida Lattimore
- Head of School: Shannon Baudo
- Grades: Pre-primary – 12th
- Enrollment: 355
- Campus: Suburban
- Colors: Blue and white
- Mascot: Wolves
- Accreditation: Institute for Independent Education and National Association of Independent Education
- Yearbook: Synergy
- Faculty:Student Ratio: 1:6
- Website: http://www.allendalecolumbia.org

Allendale Columbia School (often shortened to Allendale Columbia or abbreviated as AC.) is an independent, nonsectarian, college preparatory school for students in nursery through twelfth grade in Rochester, New York, USA. The Columbia School for girls, established in 1890 by Caroline Milliman and Alida Lattimore, and the Allendale School for boys, established in 1926 by a group of Rochester businessmen, merged in 1972 to form the current co-educational school. Allendale Columbia students come from 28 school districts in the greater Rochester, New York region, as well as from other countries. International students live in two houses on campus.

== Faculty ==
In 2018 Allendale Columbia had sixty-nine teachers. Of the twenty-five Upper School faculty members, 96% had advanced degrees.

== Campus ==
Allendale Columbia School occupies more than 30 acres (12 ha) in Pittsford, New York that stretches to Oak Hill Country Club. The school is separated into three divisions: Lower School, Middle School and Upper School. The school also offers pre-primary school for children 18 months to three years old. While these divisions each have their own areas on campus, they share many common spaces, including a 500-seat performance center, library, dining commons for locally sourced lunches, and athletic, music and arts facilities.

The main buildings house 41 classrooms, five science laboratories, nine computer laboratories (three classroom and six mobile), three music classrooms, two art studios, a darkroom, a digital photography laboratory, a foreign language laboratory, a library, a performance center, two gymnasia, and a science wing.

In 2012, the school opened residences for foreign students, and it hosts 25–35 international students.

In 2013, students began organizing and hosting an annual TEDx conference on campus, as an independently organized TED event.

In 2014, Allendale Columbia School created a summerLEAP partnership with School 17 of the Rochester City School District to provide summer enrichment programs for RCSD students.

In 2015, the school unveiled a new design and innovation laboratory with 3D printers, Mac computers, drafting tables, and tools. That year, the school also partnered with the Hybrid Learning Consortium.

In 2016, the school celebrated its 125th anniversary.

== Athletics ==
Allendale Columbia School is merged with The Harley School for interscholastic sports competition in grades 7 through 12. The two schools began coordinating their athletic programs during the 1972–1973 school year. The joint program is referred to as Harley Allendale Columbia (HAC) and originally competed as the Harley-Allendale Columbia Braves. In 1997, students of both schools voted to change the team name from the Braves to the Wolves. Team supporters are known as the Wolfpack.

The HAC enforces a "no-cut" athletic program, and varsity places are guaranteed for any committed seniors. The HAC co-ordination exists to enhance the interscholastic athletic program of both schools by combining student bodies and resources, as well as faculty for coaching purposes. The school has had success in the Section V Finger-Lakes West Division, including sectional titles in boys' and girls' tennis, boys' and girls' soccer, boys' and girls' cross country and boys' and girls' basketball.

Interscholastic Athletic Teams
Sport	Level	Season	Gender
Baseball	V, JV, M	Spring	Boys
Basketball	V, JV, M	Winter	Boys, girls
Bowling	V	Winter	Boys, girls
Cross-Country	V, JV, M	Fall	Boys, girls, co-ed (M only)
Golf	V, JV	Fall	Co-ed
Soccer	V, JV, M	Fall	Boys, girls
Softball	V, JV, M	Spring	Girls
Swimming	V, JV, M	Winter	Boys, girls
Tennis	V, JV, M	Fall (girls), spring (boys)	Boys, girls
Track (outdoor)	V, JV, M	Spring	Boys, girls, co-ed (M only)
Volleyball	V, JV, M	Fall	Girls

- V = Varsity, JV = Junior Varsity, M = Modified

== Notable alumni ==
- Alison Castle, photographer and author
- Carson Cooman, Composer-in-Residence at Harvard University
- Richard C. David, politician and Mayor of Binghamton, New York
- Taye Diggs (later transferred to School of the Arts (Rochester, New York), actor
- Nancy Northup, President of the Center for Reproductive Rights
- Katelin Schutz, physicist and cosmologist
- Kristen Wiig, actress and comedian, student, 1987–89
