= Matthew McHugh (disambiguation) =

Matthew McHugh (born 1938) is an American politician who represented New York in the U.S. House of Representatives

Matthew McHugh could also refer to:

- Matt McHugh (1894-1971), American actor
- Mat McHugh, Australian musician and member of The Beautiful Girls
