= David B. Kaplan =

American particle physicist (born 1958)

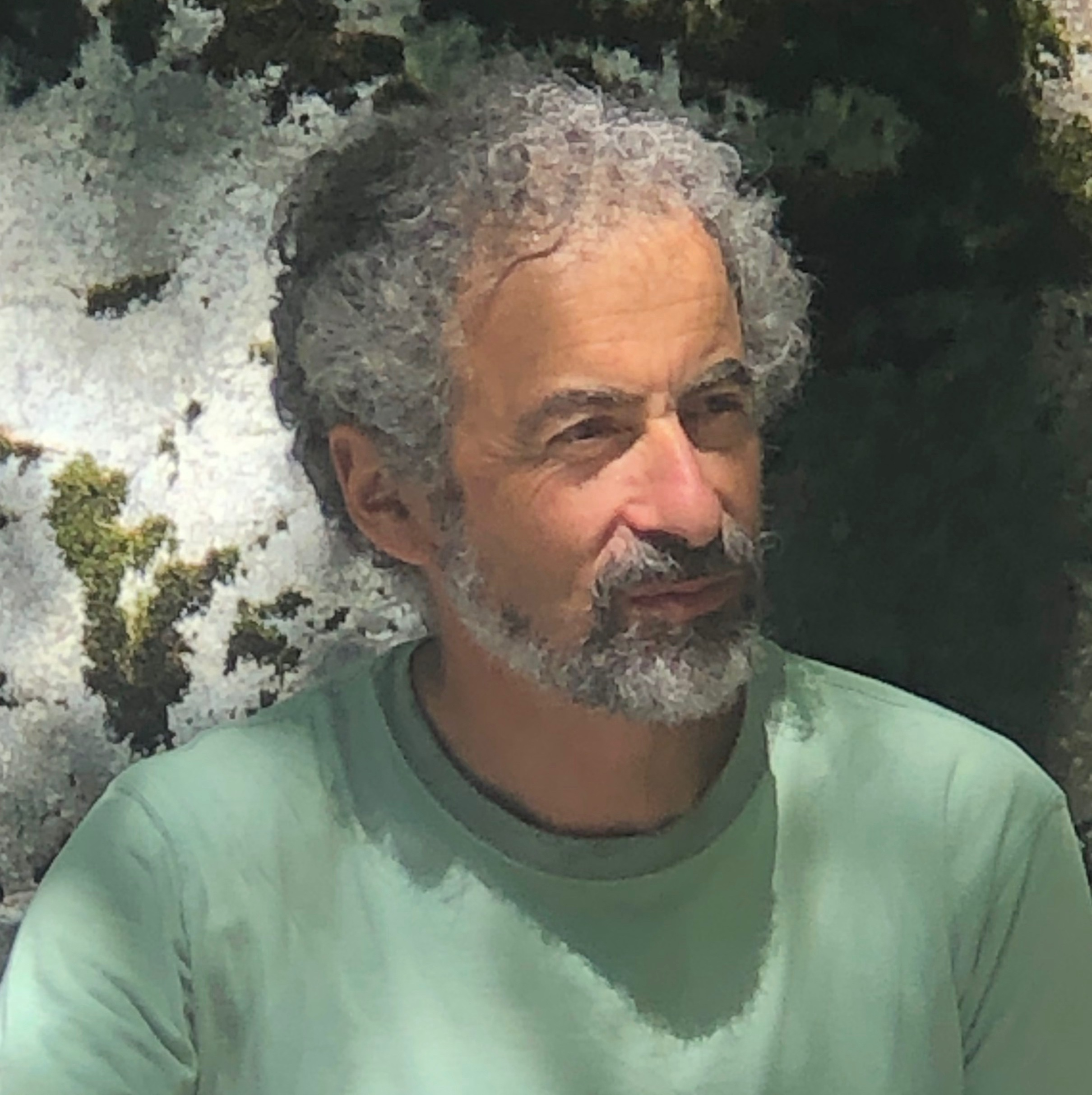
- Born: David Benjamin Kaplan; July 2, 1958; San Francisco, California, U.S.
- Education: Harvard University; Stanford University
- Known for: The Composite Higgs mechanism; Kaon condensation; Electroweak baryogenesis; Lattice chiral fermions
- Scientific career
- Fields: Particle physics, Nuclear physics
- Workplaces: Harvard Society of Fellows, University of California, San Diego, University of Washington
- Doctoral advisor: Howard Georgi
- Doctoral students: Kathryn Zurek

David B. Kaplan (born 1958) is an American physicist. He is a professor of physics at the University of Washington, where he was director of the Institute for Nuclear Theory during the period 2006–2016 and is now a senior fellow.

== Research ==
Kaplan's research deals with various aspects of quantum field theory, applied to models of physics beyond the Standard Model, cosmology, nuclear physics, and lattice QCD. He is known for his invention with Howard Georgi of composite Higgs models, investigations into the role of the strange quark in dense matter and the phenomenon of kaon condensation, development of the theory of electroweak baryogenesis and other aspects of particle astrophysics, for lattice models with exact supersymmetry, and for the formulation of lattice gauge theory with chiral fermions. The latter is known as the theory of domain-wall fermions, and was rediscovered in the condensed matter literature as an example of the quantum spin Hall effect.

== Recognition ==
Kaplan is a Member of the National Academy of Sciences, the American Academy of Arts and Sciences, and the Washington State Academy of Sciences, and is a Fellow of the American Physical Society. He is a recipient of the Department of Energy Outstanding Junior Investigator Award, the National Science Foundation Presidential Young Investigator Award, and an Alfred P. Sloan Foundation fellowship. He was awarded the 2022 Herman Feshbach Prize in Theoretical Nuclear Physics and the 2023 Caterina Tomassoni and Felice Pietro Chisesi Prize.

== Personal history ==
Kaplan graduated from the Lakeside School in Seattle, Washington, in 1976. He obtained his B.S. at Stanford University in 1980 under the supervision of Melvin Schwartz and Ph.D. in 1985 at Harvard University under the supervision of Howard Georgi. He was a junior fellow at the Harvard Society of Fellows from 1985 to 1988 and a member of the physics department at the University of California, San Diego from 1988 to 1993, before moving to the University of Washington in 1994. He was married to Ann Nelson, also a theoretical physicist, until her death in a hiking accident in August 2019. Kaplan is the nephew of physicist Bernard Peters.
