= Katelin Schutz =

American scientist

- Education: Ph.D. Berkeley, B.S. MIT
- Awards: APS Sakurai Dissertation Award; Hertz Fellow; Pappalardo Fellow; NSF Fellow; NASA Einstein Fellow
- Scientific career
- Fields: particle physics; astrophysics; cosmology
- Institutions: MIT, McGill
- Thesis: Searching for the invisible: how dark forces shape our Universe (2019)
- Doctoral advisor: Hitoshi Murayama
- Other academic advisors: Max Tegmark; Alan Guth; David Kaiser; Tracy Slatyer
- Website: https://katelinschutz.com/

Katelin Schutz is an American particle physicist known for using cosmological observations to study dark sectors, that is new particles and forces that interact weakly with the visible world. She was a NASA Einstein Fellow and Pappalardo Fellow in the MIT Department of Physics and is currently an assistant professor of physics at McGill University.

The American Physical Society awarded her the Sakurai Dissertation Award in theoretical particle physics in 2020, citing the highly original contributions from her PhD work.

== Early life ==
Schutz grew up in rural western New York in the Finger Lakes region. In 2010, she graduated from Allendale Columbia School.

== Career ==
Schutz attended MIT, where she did research with Max Tegmark, David Kaiser, and Tracy Slatyer. She was awarded a Hertz Fellowship and NSF Fellowship in 2014. She did her PhD with Hitoshi Murayama at UC Berkeley. She completed her thesis in 2019, titled "Searching for the invisible: how dark forces shape our Universe."

Schutz joined McGill University in Montreal as an assistant professor in August 2021 as part of the Centre for High Energy Physics and in the McGill Space Institute.

== Research ==
Schutz studies extensions to the Standard Model of particle physics known as dark matter that might interact only weakly or indirectly with familiar matter made of quarks and leptons. For example, her research asks whether such dark matter particles might experience new forces outside of the Standard Model, and how we might detect such interactions. In particular, such particles would interact with standard matter via gravity, and such interactions may provide a "gravitational portal between dark and visible matter" that we can observe via astronomy, e.g. stars and galaxies, including nearby dwarf galaxies and the Milky Way itself, and also large-scale cosmological structures, such as the CMB, the Lyman-alpha forest, and the cosmological 21 cm line. Schutz and colleagues have pointed out that if dark matter consists of particles that are far lighter than electrons, then particles in the Standard Model could create dark matter through feeble interactions at low temperature known as freeze-in. She has also studied strongly interacting massive particles as a dark matter candidate.

Her research has also identified mechanisms for directly detecting dark matter particles through a two-excitation process in superfluid helium as well as for detecting primordial black holes using pulsar timing.

She and her colleagues also simulate galactic halos, and have used data from Gaia to observationally constrained the existence of a dark matter disk in the Milky Way.

== Awards ==
As a graduate student, Schutz was a NSF Fellow and Hertz Foundation Fellow. She was named a 2019 Rising Star in physics by the Stanford and MIT Departments of Physics. In 2020 she was the first woman to receive the American Physical Society Sakurai Dissertation Award in theoretical particle physics.
