= Alison Castle =

American photographer and book editor

Alison Castle is an American photographer and book editor who most prominently worked on The Stanley Kubrick Archives for Taschen She is also the editor of Linda McCartney's Life in Photography, Some Like It Hot, Kubrick's Napoleon: The Greatest Movie Never Made, Marc Newson: Works, and Saturday Night Live: The Book, all published by TASCHEN.

From 2012 to 2019 she worked on a major, 5-volume retrospective of the life and work of Jacques Tati, published by TASCHEN in the fall of 2019.

Castle is the daughter of Nancy Jurs and Wendell Castle, prominent artists who reside in Scottsville, New York. She attended Allendale Columbia School in Pittsford.

Castle studied philosophy as an undergraduate at Columbia University and received her graduate degree in photography and film from the New York University/International Center of Photography masters program. She lived in Paris for 15 years before returning to the United States and is currently living in Brooklyn.
