= Ataç İmamoğlu =

Turkish-American physicist (born 1964)

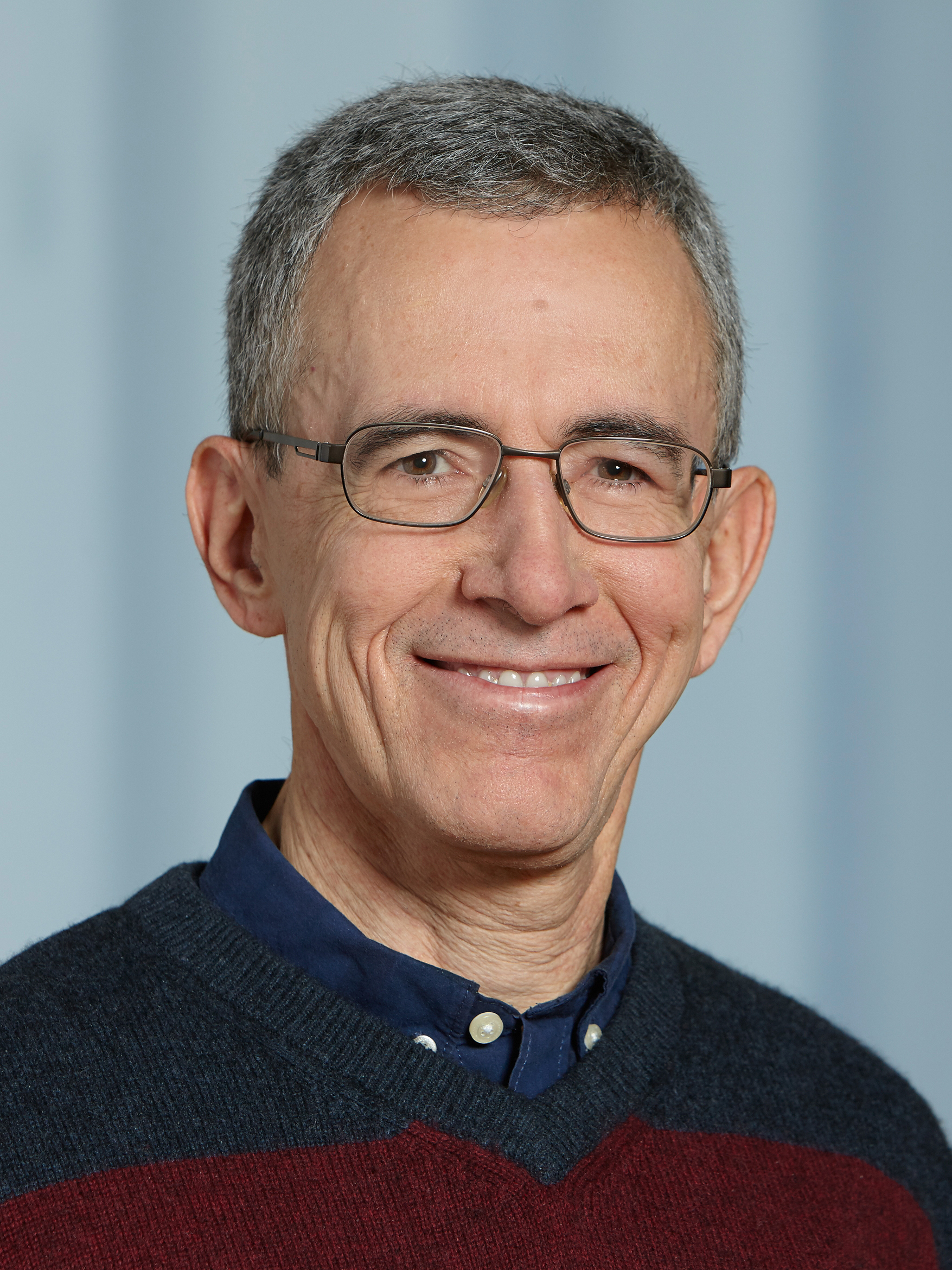
- Born: August 12, 1964 (age 62); Minneapolis, Minnesota, U.S.
- Education: TED Ankara College
- Alma mater: METU (BS); Stanford University (PhD)
- Scientific career
- Fields: Quantum optics
- Workplaces: Harvard University; UC Santa Barbara; University of Stuttgart; ETH Zurich
- Thesis: Lasers Without Inversion: Theory and Experiment (1991)
- Doctoral advisor: Stephen E. Harris

Ataç İmamoğlu (born August 12, 1964) is a Turkish-Swiss physicist working on quantum optics and quantum computation. His academic interests are quantum optics, semiconductor physics, and nonlinear optics.

== Education ==
İmamoğlu graduated from TED Ankara College in 1981. He received his BSc in electrical engineering at the Middle East Technical University, and his Ph.D. from Stanford for his work on electromagnetically induced transparency and lasers without inversion. He did post-doctoral work on atomic and molecular physics at Harvard.

== Career ==
In 1993, he joined the Electrical and Computer Engineering Department of University of California, Santa Barbara. In 1999, he became a professor of electrical engineering and physics. In 2001 he moved to the University of Stuttgart in Germany. Since 2002, he has been working at ETHZ (Swiss Federal Institute of Technology), Switzerland, where he is heading the research group on Quantum Photonics.

His group at ETHZ investigates quantum optics of solid-state zero-dimensional emitters, such as quantum dots or defects, embedded in photonic nano-structures. They are particularly interested in understanding physical properties that distinguish these solid-state systems from their atomic counterparts. Controlling quantum dynamics of quantum dot spins for applications in quantum information processing is one of their principal goals. As of February 2009, he had received ~8600 citations according to the Web of Science.

== Awards and honors ==
He received the Charles Townes Award of the Optical Society of America in 2010, Quantum Electronics Award of IEEE in 2009, the Muhammed Dahleh Award of UCSB in 2006, the Wolfgang Paul Award of the Humboldt Foundation in 2002, the TÜBİTAK prize for physics in 2001, David and Lucile Packard Fellowship in 1996, and National Science Foundation Career Award in 1995. He is a member of the Scientific Advisory Committee at the IMDEA Nanoscience Institute. He is a fellow of the American Physical Society, of the Optical Society of America and the Turkish National Academy of Sciences.
