= Kenneth L Shepard =

Kenneth L. Shepard
- Education: Princeton University; Stanford University
- Known for: electrical engineering, biomedical engineering, nanobiotechnology
- Scientific career
- Fields: Electrical Engineering, Biomedical Engineering, Nanotechnology
- Workplaces: Columbia University

Kenneth L Shepard is an American electrical engineer, nanoscientist, entrepreneur, and the Lau Family Professor of Electrical Engineering and Biomedical Engineering at the Columbia School of Engineering and Applied Science (Columbia). He has a joint appointment as Professor of Neurological Sciences (in Neurological Surgery).

He received the B. S. E. degree from Princeton University, Princeton, NJ, in 1987. He was named valedictorian of his graduating class and also received the Phi Beta Kappa prize for the highest academic standing. After graduating from Princeton, he went on to attend Stanford University, Stanford, Ca. where he earned the M. S. and Ph. D. degrees in electrical engineering (with a minor in physics), in 1988 and 1992, respectively. His studies were funded by a fellowship from the Fannie and John Hertz Foundation. His Ph. D. research was also funded by a special "Creativity in Engineering" grant from the National Science Foundation, focused on the physics of nanoscale devices. He was awarded the Hertz Foundation doctoral thesis prize in 1992, given each year to the best Ph. D. thesis from among Hertz Fellows. After receiving his Ph.D., Dr. Shepard joined the IBM Thomas J. Watson Research Center in Yorktown Heights, NY, where he became a Research Staff Member in the VLSI Design Department. At IBM, he was responsible for the design methodology for IBM's first high-performance CMOS microprocessors for the S/390 mainframe, the G4. This design methodology became the basis for subsequent microprocessor designs at IBM. He received IBM Research Division Awards in 1995 and 1997 for his contributions to the S/390 G4 project team.

== Entrepreneurial activities ==
In 1997, Dr. Shepard left IBM, joined Columbia University and simultaneously co-founded CadMOS Design Technology, an EDA start-up. CadMOS pioneered PacifIC and CeltIC, the first tools for large-scale noise analysis of digital integrated circuits. The success of PacifIC and CeltIC led Cadence to acquire CadMOS in 2001.

In 2012, Dr. Shepard co-founded Ferric Semiconductor, a New York City, private venture-backed company that uses patented thin-film inductors to improve power conversion efficiency in integrated circuits. He currently serves as the technical advisor and Chairman of Ferric. In 2014 Ferric was listed as one of the "Silicon 60" hot startups to watch by EE Times

== Contributions to science and engineering ==
=== Single-molecule electronic methods for biomolecular analysis ===
Dr. Shepard and his lab have done pioneering work in using electronic detection approaches to probe the properties of single-molecules at high bandwidth. This includes techniques employing nanopores, biological ion channels, and exposed-gate nanoscale transistors for detection.

=== Other interfaces between CMOS integrated circuits and biological or biomolecular systems ===
This includes pioneering work on electrochemical imaging and fluorescence imagers, including techniques for imaging redox-active compounds secreted by bacteria and filter-less approaches to fluorescent imaging using CMOS-integrated Geiger-mode single-photon avalanche photodiodes. Other work has focused on interfacing in vitro lipid bilayers and neural tissue with CMOS integrated circuits.

Professor Shepard and his students have done extensive work in the area of integrated power electronics, including techniques for the integration of magnetic core power inductors into a CMOS process. Dr. Shepard founded Ferric, Inc. in 2012 to commercialize the approach, which is now being brought to production manufacturing by TSMC, the world's largest semiconductor foundry.

He and his graduate students did pioneering work in exploiting newly discovered 2D electronic materials, most notably graphene, in electronic devices. This included seminal papers on field-effect transistor operation in graphene, on using boron nitride as a gate dielectric for graphene, and on using graphene-based transistors for flexible electronics

This included the invention of the static noise analysis technique for analyzing signal integrity in integrated circuits and techniques for parasitic extraction. The former work formed the basis for the start-up founded by Dr. Shepard in 1997, CadMOS Design Technology. The latter work formed the basis for techniques currently employed in CAD tools from Cadence and Mentor. He and his students also did pioneering work on the development of resonant clocking including the patent on the technique, which is widely used in industry.
