= North Side, Binghamton =

Coordinates: 42°6′48″N 75°54′9″W

North Side
- City of Binghamton neighborhood
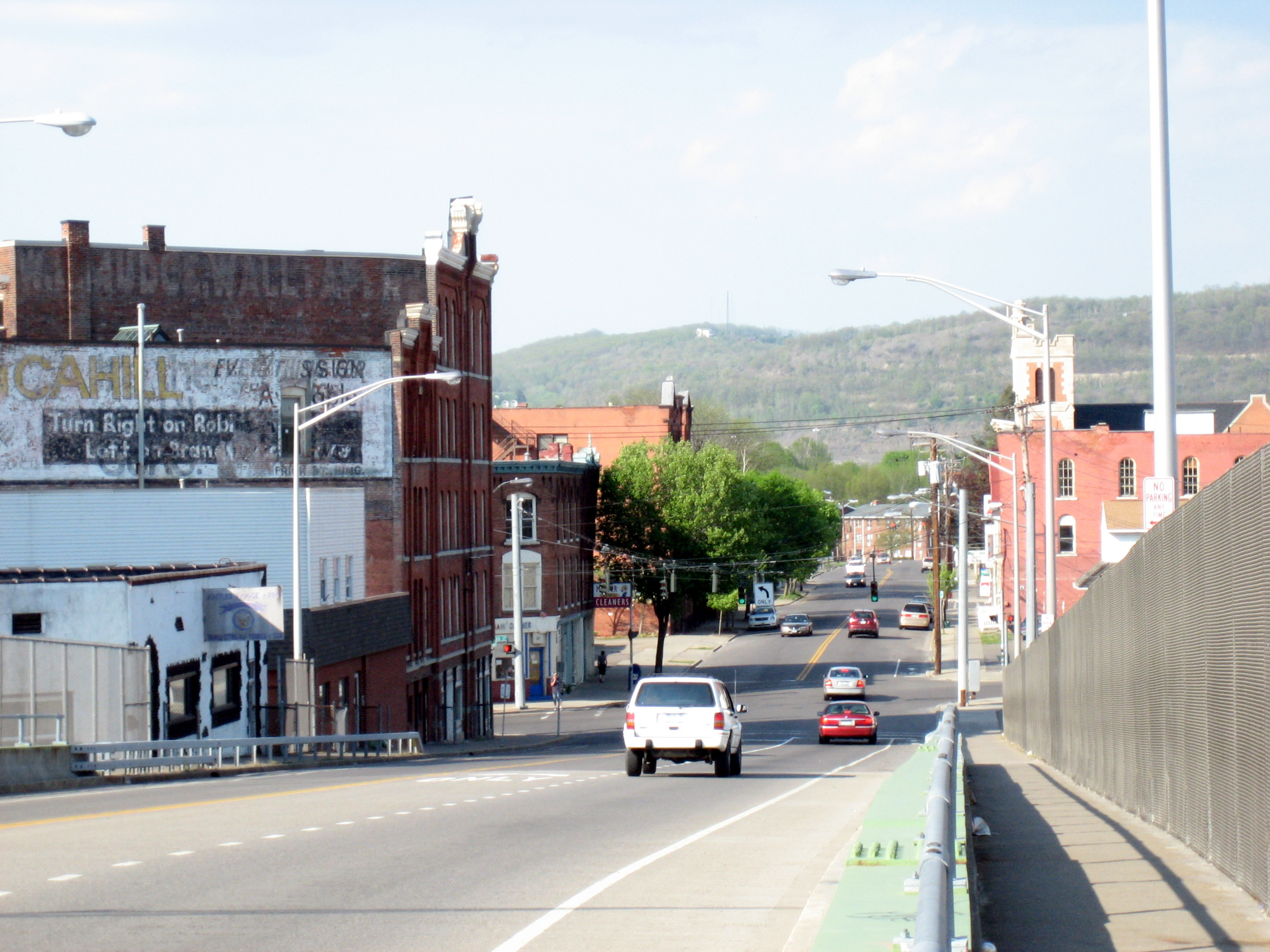
- The North Side as seen from the Chenango Street overpass, May 2007
- Interactive map of North Side
- Country: United States of America
- State: New York
- County: Broome County
- City: Binghamton

Government
  - Council Member: Aviva Friedman(D) 4th District
  - Council Member: Edward M. Collins (D) 7th District
- ZIP code: 13901
- Area code: 607
- Website: www.cityofbinghamton.com

The North Side is a neighborhood in northern section of the New York State city of Binghamton. It is a mixed-use urban neighborhood with commercial and industrial businesses many times occupying sections of residential blocks.

The North Side can be defined as encompassing the area north of the Norfolk Southern tracks and Downtown Binghamton, east of the Chenango River and the First Ward, west of the East Side of Binghamton and a small portion of the town of Dickinson and south of the village of Port Dickinson of the town of Dickinson along Bromley Avenue.

The area's "main drag" is Chenango Street. It forms the neighborhood's "spine," running on a north-south axis, starting at the Broome County Courthouse in downtown and continuing north into the neighboring communities. The neighborhood is also served by the partially limited-access Brandywine Highway which carries (NY-7).

The North Side has had some problems in the 21st century. In 2015, a strip mall anchored by a Big Lots store started to collapse. In 2021, the increasing numbers of SNAP users in the area were able to double their benefits at a non-profit grocery store. In January 2024, a fire in a boarded-up house resulted in the death of an apparent squatter.

== Demographics ==
As of the 2010 census, the North Side of Binghamton had a population of 1,969. 62.7% were White(Non-Hispanic), 18.7% African-American, 3.4% Asian and 9.6% Hispanic. The 2005-2009 American Community Survey estimates that 40.1% of the North Side was below the poverty level, including 48.8% of children younger than 18.
