= John J. Irving =

American politician

John J. Irving (c. 1863 - January 17, 1934) was an American politician. He was born in Susquehanna, Pennsylvania; his father, Nicholas Irving, was Irish. He was educated at Bryant College and became a lawyer in 1889.

He was elected mayor of Binghamton in 1909, defeating the incumbent, Clarence M. Slauson, and was re-elected in 1911.

He died on January 17, 1934; he was survived by his wife, Ida C. Hickey, and a daughter.

== See also ==
- List of mayors of Binghamton, New York
