= Kathryn Zurek =

American physicist

- Born: Minnesota, U.S.
- Education: Bethel University; University of Washington
- Scientific career
- Fields: Physics
- Workplaces: California Institute of Technology
- Thesis: Looking beyond standard neutrino and axion phenomenology and cosmology
- Doctoral advisor: David B. Kaplan

Kathryn M. Zurek is an American physicist and professor of theoretical physics at the California Institute of Technology. Her research interests primarily lie at the intersection of particle physics with cosmology and particle astrophysics. She is known for her theories on dark matter's "hidden valleys", also known as hidden sectors.

== Biography ==
Zurek was born and raised in Minnesota. She studied for a bachelor's degree in physics at Bethel University, where she graduated summa cum laude in 2001 and was awarded the 2001 Seaborg Nobel Travel Award to participate in Nobel Foundation events and present to Nobel laureates. She then received a Ph.D. in physics from the University of Washington in 2006. She was a postdoctoral fellow at the University of Wisconsin–Madison and served as the David Schramm Fellow in Fermilab's theoretical astrophysics group.

From 2009 to 2014, Zurek was an assistant and then associate professor at the University of Michigan. In 2014, she joined the Joint Particle Theory Group at the Berkeley Center for Theoretical Physics. She became a professor of theoretical physics at Caltech in 2019.

== Selected awards and honors ==
- Fellow of the American Physical Society (2016)
- Simons Investigator award (2020)

== Selected publications ==
- Katelin Schutz; Kathryn M. Zurek (2016). "Detectability of Light Dark Matter with Superfluid Helium". Phys. Rev. Lett. 117 (12) 121302. arXiv:1604.08206. Bibcode:2016PhRvL.117l1302S. doi:10.1103/physrevlett.117.121302. PMID 27689261. S2CID 36465591. Wikidata Q88457180.
- Daniele Bertolini; Mikhail Solon; Katelin Schutz; Kathryn M. Zurek (2016). "The trispectrum in the Effective Field Theory of Large Scale Structure". JCAP. 2016 (06): 052–052. arXiv:1604.01770. Bibcode:2016JCAP...06..052B. doi:10.1088/1475-7516/2016/06/052. OSTI 22667539. S2CID 118562387. Wikidata Q112669662.
- Yonit Hochberg; Yue Zhao; Kathryn M. Zurek (2016). "Superconducting Detectors for Superlight Dark Matter". Phys. Rev. Lett. 116 (1) 011301. arXiv:1504.07237. Bibcode:2016PhRvL.116a1301H. doi:10.1103/physrevlett.116.011301. OSTI 1234278. PMID 26799009. S2CID 30524296. Wikidata Q87137958.
- John Kearney; Hojin Yoo; Kathryn M. Zurek (2015). "Is a Higgs vacuum instability fatal for high-scale inflation?". Phys. Rev. D. 91 (12). arXiv:1503.05193. Bibcode:2015PhRvD..91l3537K. doi:10.1103/physrevd.91.123537. Wikidata Q112669668.
- Sean Tulin; Haibo Yu; Kathryn M. Zurek (2013). "Beyond collisionless dark matter: Particle physics dynamics for dark matter halo structure". Phys. Rev. D. 87 (11). arXiv:1302.3898. Bibcode:2013PhRvD..87k5007T. doi:10.1103/physrevd.87.115007. OSTI 1102826. S2CID 118535064. Wikidata Q112669679.
- Moira Gresham; Ian-Woo Kim; Kathryn M. Zurek (2011). "On models of new physics for the Tevatron top AFB". Phys. Rev. D. 83 (11). arXiv:1103.3501. Bibcode:2011PhRvD..83k4027G. doi:10.1103/physrevd.83.114027. S2CID 119218728. Wikidata Q112670024.
- Timothy Cohen; Daniel Phalen; Aaron Pierce; Kathryn M. Zurek (2010). "Asymmetric dark matter from a GeV hidden sector". Phys. Rev. D. 82 (5). arXiv:1005.1655. Bibcode:2010PhRvD..82e6001C. doi:10.1103/physrevd.82.056001. S2CID 119159310. Wikidata Q112670029.
- David E. Kaplan; Markus A. Luty; Kathryn M. Zurek (2009). "Asymmetric dark matter". Phys. Rev. D, 79. 79 (11). arXiv:0901.4117. Bibcode:2009PhRvD..79k5016K. doi:10.1103/physrevd.79.115016. S2CID 17954932. Wikidata Q112670039.
- Dan Hooper; Kathryn M. Zurek (2008). "Natural supersymmetric model with MeV dark matter". Phys. Rev. D. 77 (8). arXiv:0801.3686. Bibcode:2008PhRvD..77h7302H. doi:10.1103/physrevd.77.087302. Wikidata Q112670046.
- Matthew J. Strassler; Kathryn M. Zurek (2007). "Echoes of a hidden valley at hadron colliders". Phys. Lett. 651 (5–6): 374–379. arXiv:hep-ph/0604261. Bibcode:2007PhLB..651..374S. doi:10.1016/j.physletb.2007.06.055. S2CID 222558166. Wikidata Q112670054.

== In the press ==
- "Berkeley Leans into Search for Light Dark Matter," 10 June 2019, Symmetry Magazine.
- "In Search for Unseen Matter, Physicists Turn to Dark Sector," 24 March 2017, Science.
- "New Techniques Could Target More Exotic Dark Matter," 13 October 2016, Scientific American.
- "Physics - Synopsis: Spotting Dark Matter with Supermaterials,"14 September 2016, APS Physics.
- "Hunting for Dark Matter's Hidden Valley," 24 May 2016 in Berkeley Lab News Center.
- "Physicists Widen the Search for Dark Matter Particles," June 2014, APS News.
- "Dark Matter Hunt Appears to be Zeroing In on a Leading Contender," 22 July 2013 in Wired Science.
- "Tentative dark matter hints with shadow dark sector," 16 April 2013 in New Scientist.
- "Peering Back 13 Billion Years, Through a Gravitational Lens," 29 April 2011 in Science.
- "The dark side of antimatter," by Rachel Courtland, 25 November 2010 in New Scientist.
- "Super-sensitive tool key to dark matter claim" 9 July 2008 in Nature.
