= Stephen E. Harris =

American physicist (born 1936)

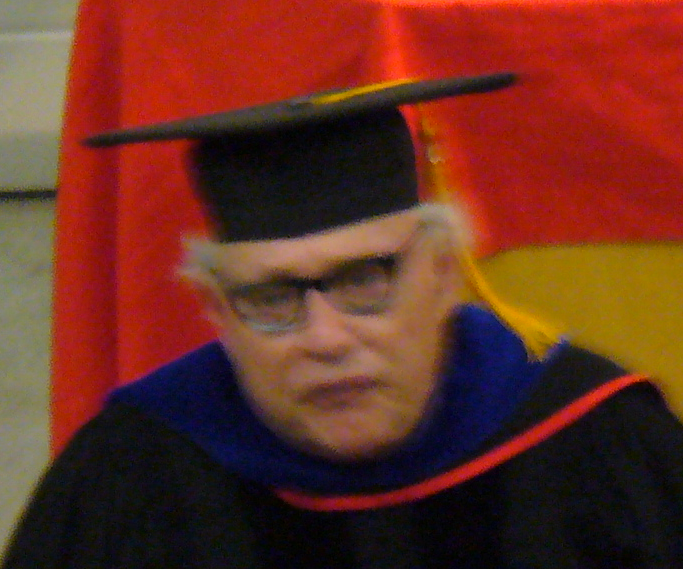
- Stephen Harris
- Born: November 29, 1936 (age 89); Brooklyn, New York
- Education: Stanford University; Rensselaer Polytechnic Institute
- Scientific career
- Fields: Physics
- Workplaces: Stanford University
- Doctoral advisor: Anthony E. Siegman
- Doctoral students: Robert L. Byer, Ataç İmamoğlu, Richard Miles

Stephen Ernest Harris (born November 29, 1936) is an American physicist known for his contributions to electromagnetically induced transparency (EIT), modulation of single photons, and x-ray emission.

In a diverse career, he has collaborated with others to produce results in many areas, including the 1999 paper titled “Light speed reduction to 17 metres per second in an ultracold gas,” in which Lene Hau and Harris, Cyrus Behroozi and Zachary Dutton describe how they used EIT to slow optical pulses to the speed of a bicycle. He has also contributed to developments in the use of the laser, generating paired photons with single driving lasers He has also shown the development of such pairs of photons using waveforms.

His more recent work has sought to address restraints imposed on the types of waveforms that can be produced by the single-cycle barrier Harris and colleagues succeeded in this endeavour in 2005 during a series of experiments aimed at obtaining full control of waveforms, noting "we were able to vary the shape of the pulse to generate different prescribed waveforms." It is hoped that these results will lead to coherent control of chemical reactions, as a probe for ever-shorter physical processes, and for highly efficient generation of far infra-red and vacuum ultra-violet radiation.

Harris was elected as a member into the National Academy of Engineering in 1977 for contributions in the field of coherent and non-linear optics.

== Education ==
- 1959 B.S., Electrical Engineering, Rensselaer Polytechnic Institute
- 1961 M.S., Electrical Engineering, Stanford University
- 1963 Ph.D., Electrical Engineering, Stanford University

== Awards ==
- 1973 Curtis W. McGraw Research Award (American Society for Engineering Education)
- 1978 David Sarnoff Award (The Institute of Electrical and Electronics Engineers)
- 1984 Davies Medal for Engineering Achievement (Rensselaer Polytechnic Institute)
- 1985 Charles Hard Townes Award (Optical Society of America)
- 1991 Einstein Prize for Laser Science (International Conference on Lasers and Applications)
- 1992 Optical Society of America (Stanford Chapter) Teaching Award
- 1994 Quantum Electronics Award (The Institute of Electrical and Electronics Engineers)
- 1999 Frederic Ives Medal (highest award of the Optical Society of America)
- 2002 Arthur L. Schawlow Prize in Laser Science (American Physical Society)
- 2007 Harvey Prize (Awarded by the Technion-Israel Institute of Technology)
- 2020 Willis E. Lamb Award for Laser Science and Quantum Optics

== Honours ==
- 1968 Fellow of the Optical Society of America
- 1972 Fellow of the Institute of Electrical and Electronics Engineers
- 1975 Fellow of American Physical Society
- 1976 Guggenheim Fellowship
- 1977 Elected to the National Academy of Engineering
- 1981 Elected to the National Academy of Sciences
- 1988 Kenneth and Barbara Oshman Professor of Engineering Endowed Chair (Stanford University)
- 1994 Fellow of the American Association for the Advancement of Science
- 1995 Elected to Fellow of the American Academy of Arts and Sciences
- 2005 Stephen E. Harris Endowed Professorship in Quantum Optics (Texas A&M University)
- 2013 Honorary Member of the Optical Society of America
