= Government Plaza, Binghamton =

Government building complex in New York State

Coordinates: 42°5′48″N 75°54′41″W

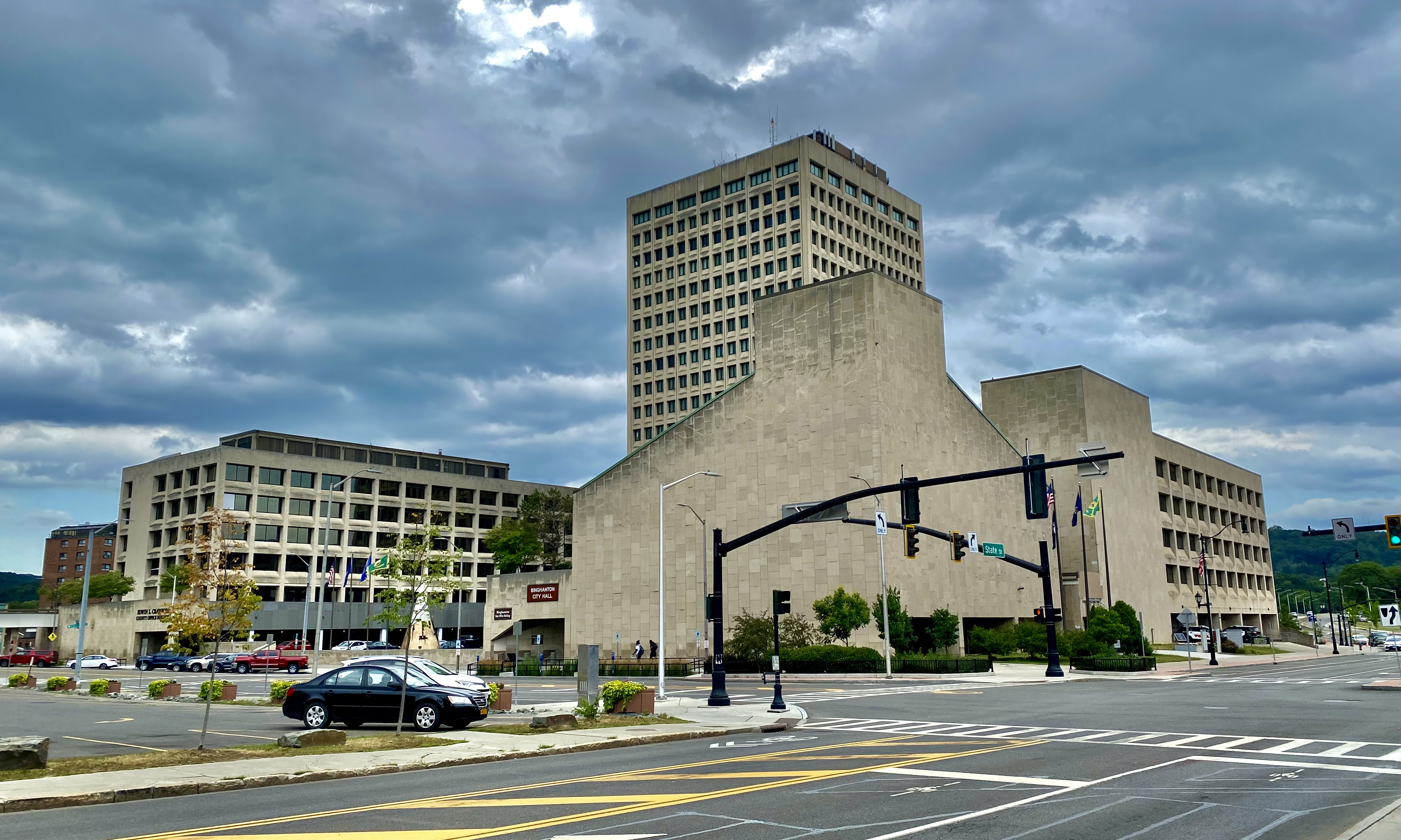
Government Plaza.

Government Plaza is a building complex in Binghamton, New York containing the offices for the City of Binghamton, Broome County and New York State. The complex is located in Downtown Binghamton on the block bounded by State, Hawley, Isbell and Susquehanna streets. It was constructed as part of a massive urban renewal plan in Binghamton through the late 1960s and early 1970s.

Government Plaza is composed of three buildings which come together to form a U-shaped complex:

- the towering 18-story State Office Building, which is the tallest building in the Southern Tier region of New York
- the Edwin L. Crawford County Office Building, which forms the east wing of the complex
- Binghamton City Hall, which forms the west wing.

The complex includes an underground two-level parking structure. An elevated plaza that originally led to the second-story lobby of the State Office Building was torn down in the mid-1990s due to deterioration and increasing maintenance costs.

== State Office Building contamination ==
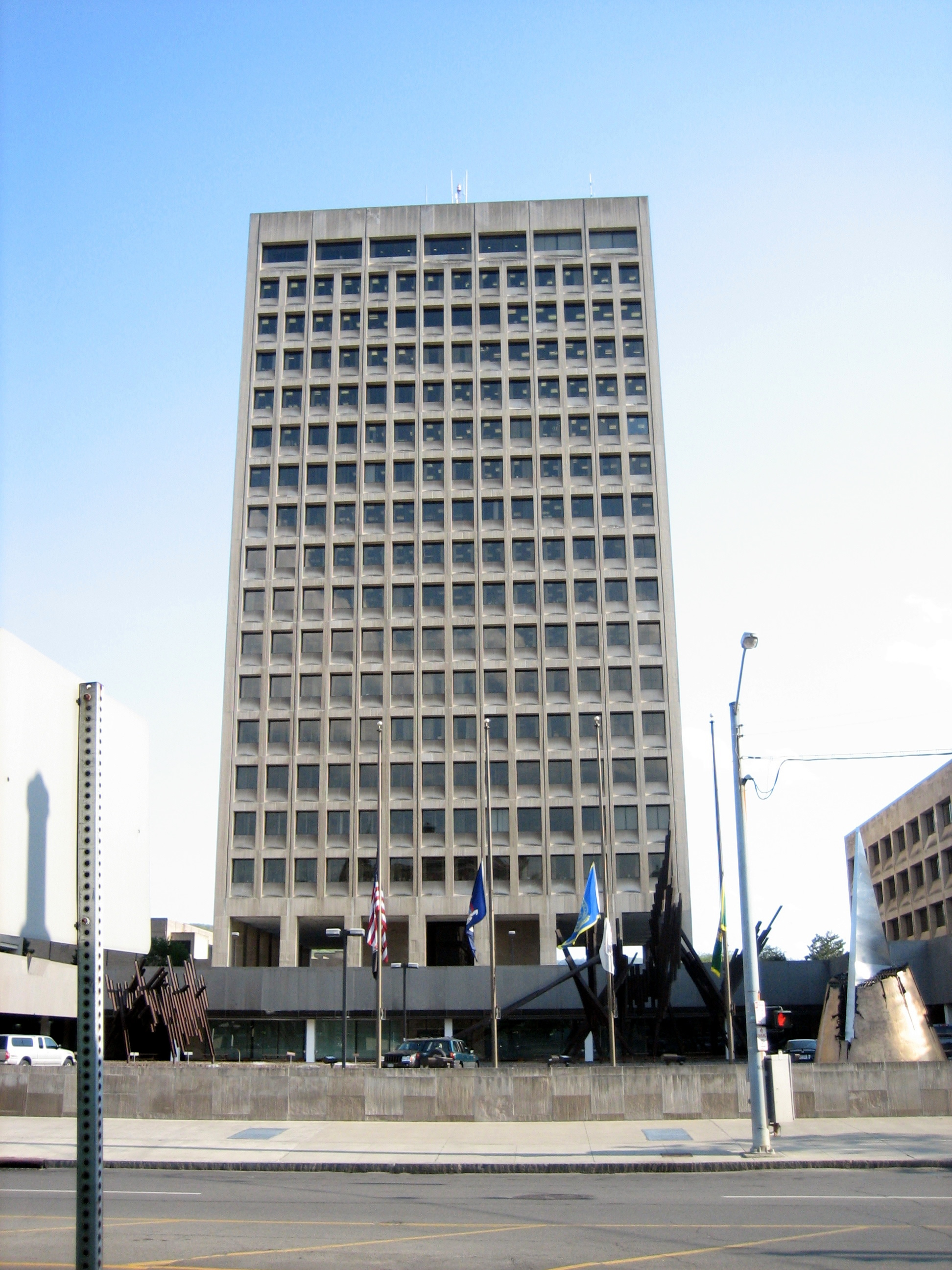
State Office Building

The State Office Building is infamous for a fire that took place on February 5, 1981. A transformer explosion in the basement of the building spewed soot containing toxic PCBs throughout the entire building. While initially expected to only take days to reopen, the cleanup effort revealed the difficulty of removing PCB residue. The building remained closed until October 11, 1994. Multiple environmental samples taken throughout the cleanup had illustrated that despite their best efforts, workers had been unable to remove the residue, leading to several complete decontamination procedures within the building. The duration of the cleanup, combined with the uncertainty of the final effectiveness of the cleanup, led many workers to question whether the building was safe enough for reoccupation. While the initial cost of constructing the building in 1972 was $17 million, the cleanup efforts cost $53 million.

== See also ==
- List of mayors of Binghamton, New York
