= Abel Bennett Tract Historic District =

Historic district in New York, United States

- U.S. National Register of Historic Places
- U.S. Historic district
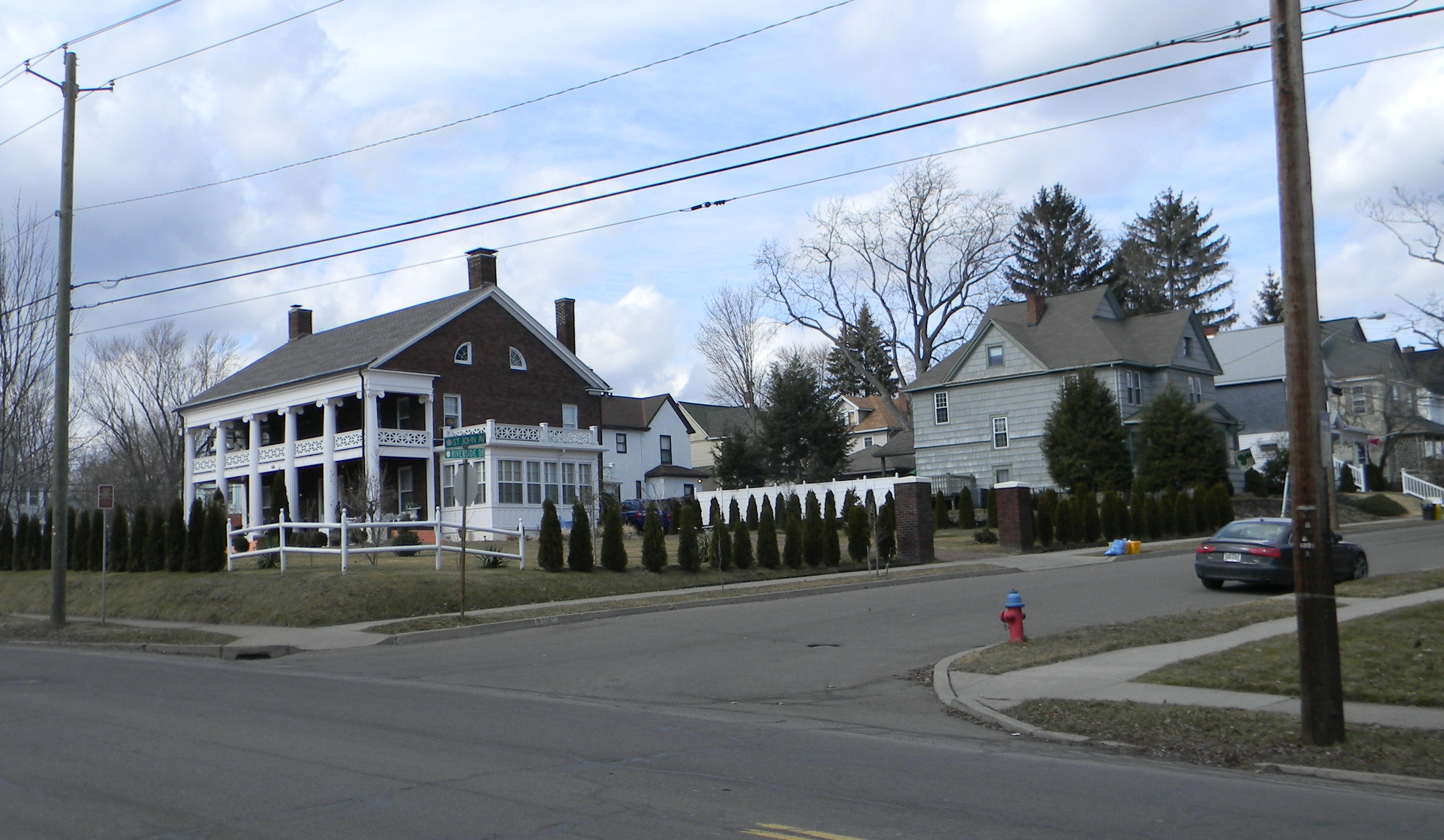
- Corner of Riverside Drive and St. John Ave., Abel Bennett Tract, February 2012

- Location within New York Location within the United States
- Location: Bounded by Riverside Dr., Seminary & St. John Aves., & Beethoven St., Binghamton, New York
- Coordinates: 42°5′42.31″N 75°55′47.52″W
- Area: 53 acres (21 ha)
- Built: 1887
- Architectural style: Late Victorian, Late 19th And 20th Century Revivals
- NRHP reference No.: 08000035
- Added to NRHP: February 19, 2008

Abel Bennett Tract Historic District is a national historic district located at Binghamton in Broome County, New York. The district includes 1,053 contributing buildings, two contributing sites, one contributing structure, and two contributing objects.

It was listed on the National Register of Historic Places in 2008.

== See also ==
- Abel Bennett
