= Bartosz Żurek =

Polish footballer

Personal information
- Full name: Bartosz Żurek
- Date of birth: 15 March 1993 (age 33)
- Place of birth: Sosnowiec, Poland
- Height: 1.81 m (5 ft 11 in)
- Position: Left winger

Youth career
- 2008–2009: Nida Pińczów
- 2009–2011: KSZO Ostrowiec
- 2011: Legia Warsaw

Senior career*
Years	Team	Apps	(Gls)
2012–2015	Legia Warsaw	1	(0)
2013	→ GKS Bełchatów (loan)	10	(0)
2013–2014	→ Cracovia (loan)	0	(0)
2013–2014	→ Znicz Pruszków (loan)	9	(1)
2014–2015	Legia Warsaw II	2	(0)
2016	Elana Toruń	12	(4)
2016–2021	Puszcza Niepołomice	91	(13)
2021	→ GKS Bełchatów (loan)	8	(0)
2021–2022	KSZO Ostrowiec	23	(1)
2022–2023	Podhale Nowy Targ	30	(7)
2023–2024	Garbarnia Kraków	18	(3)
2024–2025	Wiślanie Skawina	30	(0)

International career
2010	Poland U17	1	(0)
2011	Poland U19	1	(0)
2012	Poland U20	2	(0)
2013	Poland U21	2	(0)
- * Club domestic league appearances and goals as of 17:53, 11 June 2025 (UTC)

Bartosz Żurek (born 15 March 1993) is a Polish professional footballer who plays as a left winger.

== Honours ==
Legia Warsaw

- Polish Cup: 2012–13

Podhale Nowy Targ

- Polish Cup (Nowy Targ regionals): 2021–22
