= Michael Telson =

American engineer

Michael L. Telson is an American engineer currently at the Federation of American Scientists and General Atomics Corporation and is an Elected Fellow of the American Association for the Advancement of Science, since 1999 and also an American Physical Society Fellow since 2004. He is an expert on technology and formulation policies and budgets. From 1975 to 1995, he was on the U.S. House of Representatives Budget Committee. From 1997 to 2001, he was the chief financial officer for the U. S. Department of Energy.

== Education ==
He earned his Ph.D. (1973), E.E., M.S. and B.S. from Massachusetts Institute of Technology and an M.S. in management from MIT.

== Publications ==
- The economics of alternative levels of reliability for electric power generation systems, ML Telson – The Bell Journal of Economics, 1975
- The economics of reliability for electric generation systems, ML Telson – 1973, MIT
