= Tracy Slatyer =

Particle physicist

Professor Tracy Slatyer
- Education: PhD, Harvard
- Awards: New Horizons in Physics Prize
- Scientific career
- Fields: particle physics, astrophysics
- Workplaces: MIT
- Thesis: Signatures of a new force in the dark matter sector (2010)
- Doctoral advisor: Douglas P. Finkbeiner
- Website: web.mit.edu/physics/people/faculty/slatyer_tracy.html

Artist's conception of Fermi Bubbles

Tracy Robyn Slatyer is a professor of particle physics with a concentration in theoretical astrophysics with tenure at MIT. She was a 2014 recipient of the Rossi Prize for gamma ray detection of Fermi bubbles, which are unexpected large structures in our galaxy. Her research also involves seeking explanations for dark matter and the gamma ray haze at the center of the Milky Way. In 2021, she was awarded a New Horizons in Physics Prize for "major contributions to particle astrophysics, from models of dark matter to the discovery of the 'Fermi Bubbles'."

== Early life and education ==
Slatyer was born in the Solomon Islands and grew up in Australia and Fiji. She studied at Narrabundah College in Canberra, Australia. In 2005, she completed her undergraduate in theoretical physics at the Australian National University, and her doctorate in physics at Harvard University in 2010 under the direction of Douglas Finkbeiner.

== Career and research ==
From 2010 to 2013, she was a John N. Bahcall Fellow at the Institute for Advanced Study. She joined the faculty at MIT the same year and received tenure in 2019.

== Honors and awards ==
- 2021 New Horizons in Physics Prize
- Presidential Early Career Award for Scientists and Engineers (awarded 2019)
- 2017 Henry Primakoff Award for Early-Career Particle Physics from the American Physical Society
- 2014 Rossi Prize with Douglas Finkbeiner and Meng Su
