= Binghamton Police Department =

Law enforcement agency in Binghamton, New York

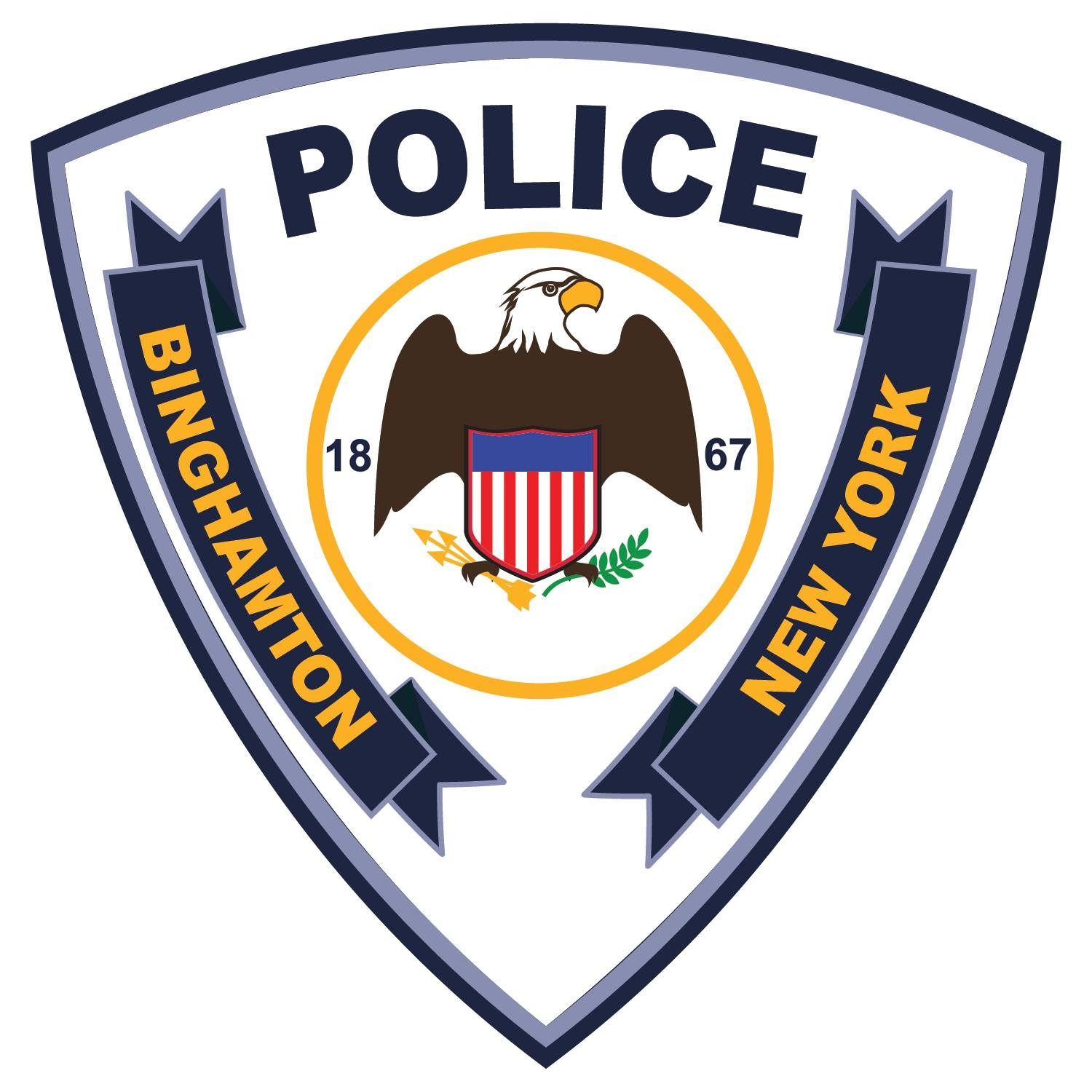
- Abbreviation: BPD

Agency overview
- Formed: 1867
- Employees: 142 sworn

Jurisdictional structure
- Operations jurisdiction: Binghamton, New York, US
- Population: 47,566
- General nature: Local civilian police

Website
- www.binghamton-ny.gov/government/departments/police-department

The Binghamton Police Department (BPD) is the municipal law enforcement agency responsible for providing law enforcement services to the City of Binghamton, New York. The Binghamton Police Department was founded in 1867 and in 2023, had 142 sworn police officers, and 13 civilian employees.

The Binghamton Police Department are headquartered at Government Plaza, in Downtown Binghamton, New York.

== Organization ==
The Binghamton Police Department has a variety of different specialist components & divisions that allow it to carry out its law enforcement responsibilities.

There are several divisions within the department including:

- Patrol Division
- Metro SWAT (a joint SWAT unit with officers from numerous Broome county agencies)
- Detective Division
- Special Investigations Unit (a joint investigations unit with detectives from numerous Broome County agencies)
- Community Response Team
- Traffic Division
- Training Division
- Juvenile Division
- Crime Scene Unit
- Crime Prevention Division
- Warrant Unit

== Department controversies ==
In 2023, the department settled a case of racial discrimination.

== Ranks ==
Police Chief	
Assistant Police Chief	
Captain	
Lieutenant	
Sergeant	
Detective	No insignia
Police Officer	No insignia

== Line of duty deaths ==
Patrolman Lee E. Barta	August 3, 1995	Gunfire
Patrolman William F. Holbert, Jr.	July 17, 1972	Gunfire
Patrolman George J. Weslar	February 4, 1939	Gunfire
Patrolman Gerald M. Tracey	December 23, 1928	Vehicle pursuit
Patrolman Clarence W. Moran	November 30, 1922	Gunfire
Patrolman William F. McDonald	November 30, 1920	Gunfire
Patrolman Alex Horvatt	July 29, 1917	Electrocuted

== See also ==
- List of law enforcement agencies in New York State
