= Carolyn Kriegman =

American jewellery designer (1933–1999)

- Born: 1933; New York
- Died: September 30, 1999 (66); New York City, US
- Education: Yale University
- Occupations: Artist, jewellery designer
- Movement: American Studio Craft

Carolyn Kriegman (1933–1999) was a jewelry maker in New Jersey during the American Studio Craft movement. She is notable for her contributions to the field of craft because her use of the emerging medium of plastic. She utilized plastic because of the medium's unique color, transparency, and light properties.

== Biography ==
Kriegman was born in New York in 1933 and died in New York City in 1999. She studied under Josef Albers at Yale and Ossip Zadkine and Stanley William Hayter in Paris.

Kriegman began to make jewelry in her kitchen in New Jersey and used the stove to heat and bend acrylic into playful forms. Throughout her career as a designer-craftsperson, she contributed to many of the institutions active in the craft community. She was a New Jersey state representative for the American Craft Council Northeast Region Assembly and she participated in many Northeast Craft Fairs as a vendor, a director on the board, and a member of the awards committee, among other roles. She served as president of the New Jersey Designer Craftsmen and the Deer Isle Artists Association in Maine. She was on the Board of Directors of Peter's Valley and on the craft committee of the New Jersey Council on the Arts.

Her work has been displayed in the Smithsonian, the Newark Museum, the Museum of Contemporary Crafts in New York City, the Los Angeles County Museum of Art, and the New Jersey State Museum in Trenton.
