= Eva Zurek =

Theoretical chemist

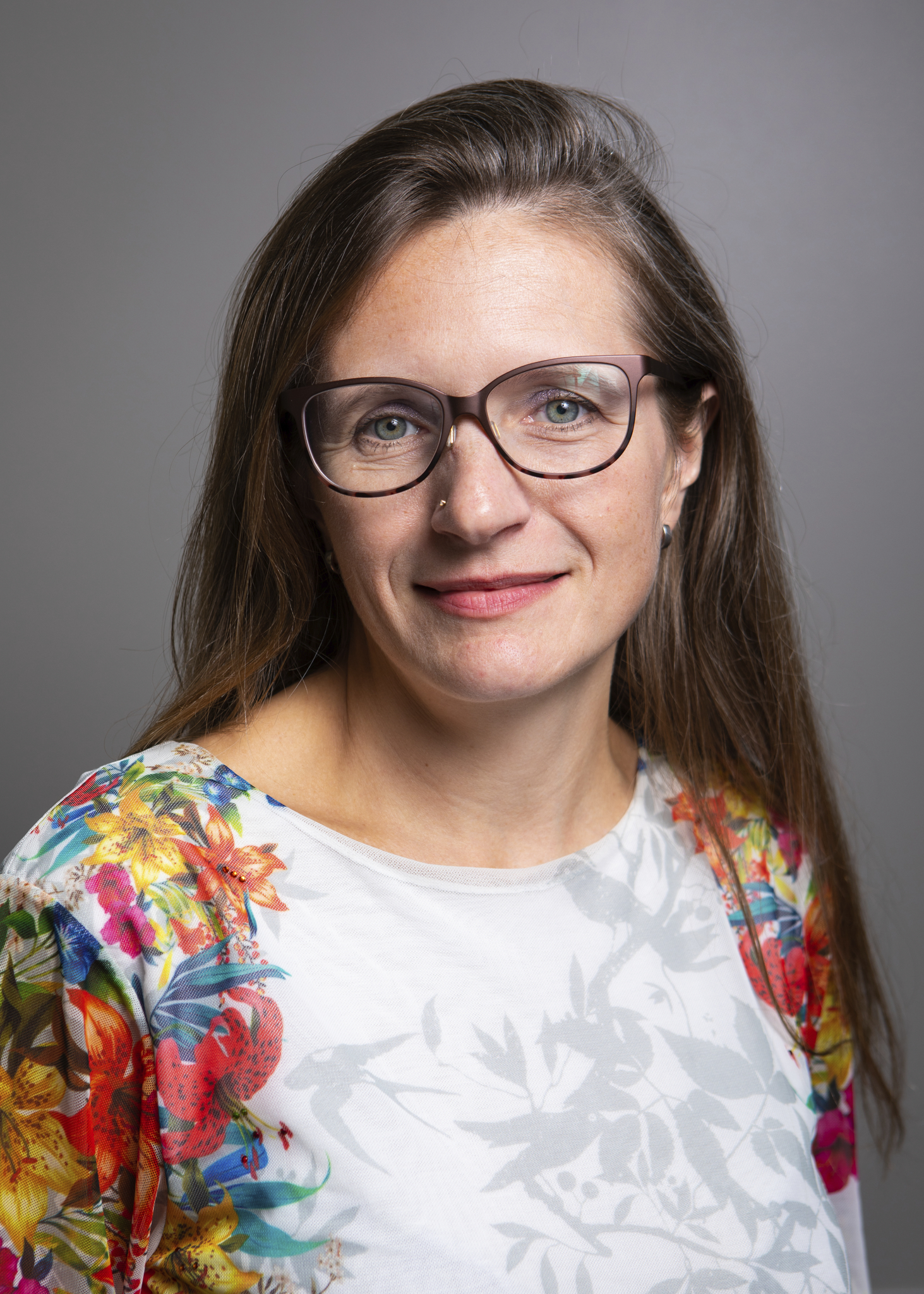
- Zurek in 2022
- Born: 1976 (age 49–50)

Academic background
- Education: BSc, 2000, MSc, 2002, University of Calgary; PhD, 2006, University of Stuttgart
- Thesis: Density functional theory (DFT) studies of solids and molecules (2006)
- Academic advisor: Roald Hoffmann

Eva Dagmara Zurek (born 1976) is a theoretical chemist, solid-state physicist and materials scientist. As a professor of chemistry at the University at Buffalo, Zurek studies the electronic structure, properties, and reactivity of a wide variety of materials using quantum mechanical calculations. She is interested in high pressure science, superhard, superconducting, quantum and planetary materials, catalysis, as well as solvated electrons and electrides. She develops algorithms to predict the structures of crystals, interfaces them with machine learning models, and applies them in materials discovery.

== Early life and education ==
Zurek was born in 1976 in Poland. She completed her Bachelor of Science and master's degree at the University of Calgary, where she carried out research with Tom Ziegler. While at the University of Calgary, Zurek was a recipient of one of the Alberta Ingenuity grants. Zurek's PhD was carried out in the group of Ole Krogh Andersen at the Max Planck Institute for Solid State Research, and she received her degree from the University of Stuttgart in Germany. Following her PhD, she accepted a postdoctoral associate position at Cornell University under Roald Hoffmann.

== Career ==
Upon completing her postdoctoral work at Cornell, Zurek joined the faculty at the University at Buffalo (UB) in 2009. In October 2009, Zurek co-authored a paper with Hoffmann and other colleagues in the Proceedings of the National Academy of Sciences of the United States of America predicting that LiH6 could form as a stable metal at a pressure of around 1 million atmospheres. As an assistant professor of chemistry, Zurek research group wrote an algorithm called XtalOpt to predict hydrogen-rich compounds that may be superconducting metals under pressure.

By 2016, Zurek was promoted to associate professor where she continued her work on superconductors. Her research team used the algorithm XtalOpt to understand which combinations of phosphorus and hydrogen were stable at pressures of up to 200 gigapascals. Their results determined that phosphine's superconductivity under pressure likely arose due to the compound decomposing into other chemical products that contain phosphorus and hydrogen. In 2019, Zurek oversaw a research team which used computational techniques to identify 43 previously unknown forms of carbon that are thought to be stable and superhard.

In 2021, Zurek was named a Fellow of the American Physical Society (APS) for "the application of forefront computational electronic structure methods to reveal microscopic processes occurring in large molecules and nanostructures, for the design of hydride superconductors, and for related educational innovations in computational science." At the end of the 2020–21 academic year, Zurek was named a recipient of the 2021 SUNY Chancellor's Award for Excellence. She was also elected by the Division of Computational Physics of the APS as its Vice Chair for the 2022–23 year.

== Awards and honors ==
- 2024 State University of New York (SUNY) Distinguished Professor
- 2023 WNYACS Schoellkopf Medal
- 2022 Fellow of the American Physical Society
- 2021 SUNY Chancellor's Award for Excellence in Scholarship
- 2014 The Minerals, Metals & Materials Society's Young Leader Professional Development Award
- 2014 Promising Young Scientist prize from the Centre de Mecanique Ondulatoire Appliquee
- 2013 Sloan Research Fellowship
