= Building Performance Database =

The Building Performance Database (BPD) is an anonymized database that contains energy use intensity data for hundreds of thousands of buildings in the United States. It is built by the Department of Energy in the United States and maintained by the Lawrence Berkeley National Laboratory. Users can examine specific building types and geographic areas, compare performance trends among similar buildings, identify and prioritize cost-saving energy efficiency improvements, and assess the range of likely savings from these improvements.

== History ==
Prior to its launch, the BPD was described in a conference presentation by Elena Alschuler and Cody Taylor from October 2012. and another presentation by Alschuler in May 2013.

The BPD was launched in June 2013 with data from over 60,000 commercial and residential buildings.

A factsheet put out by the White House Press Room on May 28, 2014, cited the Building Performance Database as an example of a success story, saying that it has exceeded a milestone of 750,000 building records, making it the world's largest public database of real buildings’ energy performance information.

== Data and API ==
The BPD has an application programming interface (API) that can return the energy use intensity for any group of buildings defined by an API request. The BPD contains business proprietary and confidential information, and all data is anonymized and can only be analyzed in aggregate. The API can be accessed using Python, Ruby, or cURL.
