= Richard Miles (aerospace engineer) =

American aerospace scientist

- Education: Stanford University
- Scientific career
- Fields: Aerospace Engineering, Rayleigh scattering, Plasma aerodynamics & hypersonics
- Workplaces: Princeton University, Texas A&M University
- Doctoral advisor: Stephen E. Harris

Richard Miles is Distinguished University Professor and O'Donnell Chair V at the Department of Aerospace Engineering at Texas A&M University. He was Chairman of the Engineering Physics Program at Princeton for 16 years (1980–1996). He has been a member of the National Academy of Engineering since 2011. He has developed and researched lasers as tools for studying hypersonic flow patterns.

== Early life and education ==
Richard B. Miles grew up in Orinda, California. He was influenced in his scientific pursuits by his older brother Tom with whom he conducted impromptu explosive experiments in the family's backyard and home during the boys' shared childhood.

While still in high school, Miles spent two summers interning at the Lawrence Berkeley Laboratory, studying the interaction of K-mesons with deuterium under Luis Alvarez.

Miles applied and was accepted to Stanford University, where his grandfather had been a professor of psychology during the 1920s, matriculating in the fall of 1961. Initially a physics major, Miles switched in his junior year to electrical engineering. He spent nine months in Europe as part of the Stanford-in-France overseas program and graduated in January 1966.

Continuing his graduate work at Stanford, Miles studied first in the Systems Techniques Laboratory "on holography and laser propagation" with Joseph Goodman, then with Hubert Heffner on quantum systems. When Heffner left Stanford to join the staff at the Nixon White House, Miles applied for and received funding from the Hertz Foundation.

Professor Miles received his Ph.D. in 1972 from Stanford University in Electrical Engineering under Steve Harris.

== Career ==
Miles's first job out of Stanford was at Princeton University in New Jersey, where he joined the Mechanical and Aerospace Engineering faculty in the Fall of 1972. He served as Chairman of Engineering Physics from 1980 to 1996. He was named Robert Porter Patterson Professor in 2011 and became emeritus and Senior Scholar at Princeton on June 30, 2013.

While at Princeton, Miles and his research team developed numerous flow diagnostic methods including Femtosecond Laser Electronic Excitation Tagging (FLEET), a velocimetry technique with the capacity to measure fluid velocity at high flow speeds.

Miles retired from Princeton in 2013. He then joined Texas A&M University in February 2017 after being recruited through the Governor's University Research Initiative, which awarded Texas A&M a $5 million grant associated with his appointment. He joined the Department of Aerospace Engineering as a TEES Distinguished Research Professor, where he was named University Research Professor in 2019. Work in Texas includes laser diagnostics for hypersonics and directed energy for the Bush Combat Development Complex (BCDC).

== Research and boards ==
His research focuses on the use of lasers, electron beams, microwaves and magnetic devices to observe, control, accelerate, extract power and precondition gas flows for supersonic and hypersonic fluid dynamics, combustion, propulsion and homeland defense applications.

He is a member of the National Academy of Engineering, a Fellow of the National Academy of Inventors, a Fellow of the Fannie & John Hertz Foundations, a Fellow of the AIAA, a Fellow of Optica, a member of the Board of Directors of the Hertz Foundation, a Member of the Board of Trustees of Pacific University (Forest Grove, OR) where his brother went to school and tragically died in a car accident in 1964, and an AIAA Representative to the Elmer A. Sperry Board of Awards.

== Personal life ==
Miles is married to Susan McCoy, an obstetrician-gynecologist, with whom he has two children. Miles and his wife "share a common goal of trying to make the world a bit better through both philanthropy and volunteer service." In 2021, they established a named Hertz Fellowship "to provide those same opportunities to the next generation" that Miles himself had received.

== Awards ==
Fannie and John K. Hertz Fellowship (1969-1972); Certificate of Distinguished Service to the AIAA, (1994); AIAA Aerodynamic Measurement Technology Award and Medal, (2000); AIAA Plasma Dynamics and Lasers Award and Medal, (2012); US Air Force Commander’s Public Service Award (2015); W.E. Lamb Medal for Laser Science and Quantum Optics (2026).
