= David Kriegman =

David Kriegman is a professor of computer science and engineering at the University of California, San Diego, was named Fellow of the Institute of Electrical and Electronics Engineers (IEEE) in 2015 for contributions to computer vision. Since 2007, he has also been the CEO and founder of Taaz, Inc.

He joined Two Sigma Investments in 2019 as an AI researcher.

== Education ==
- Stanford University, MS and Ph.D, both in Electrical Engineering (1984 and 1989 respectively)
- Princeton University, BSE, Electrical Engineering and Computer Science, June, 1983. Summa cum laude.
