= Guthrie Lourdes Hospital =

- Location within New York

Geography
- Location: 169 Riverside Drive, Binghamton, New York, United States
- Coordinates: 42.109314°N 75.942044°W

Organization
- Type: Community

History
- Founded: 1925

Links
- Website: https://www.guthrie.org/locations/guthrie-lourdes-hospital
- Lists: Hospitals in New York State

Guthrie Lourdes Hospital, formerly Our Lady of Lourdes Memorial Hospital is a 197 bed community hospital in Binghamton, New York, United States.

Bishop Daniel Curley had specifically requested that nuns Martina Disney, Gertrude Eisele, Rose Anna Hastings, and Louise McParland, later known as the Four Daughters of Charity, open a hospital in Binghamton in 1925. Thus began the 25 bed Our Lady of Lourdes Memorial Hospital in the Corbett mansion where they lived.

In 1983, the hospital was selected by the US Federal Government to take part in a national cancer research project. In 2006, a flood cost the hospital several million dollars in damages.

In 2017, Lourdes was granted a three-year/full accreditation designation by the National Accreditation Program for Breast Centers (NAPBC).

In 2018, Lourdes was ranked as the 21st best hospital in New York according to the U.S. News Best Hospitals specialty rankings.

On February 1, 2024, Our Lady of Lourdes Memorial Hospital was acquired by the Guthrie Clinic based in Sayre, Pennsylvania.
