= Downtown Binghamton =

- City of Binghamton neighborhood
- Center City
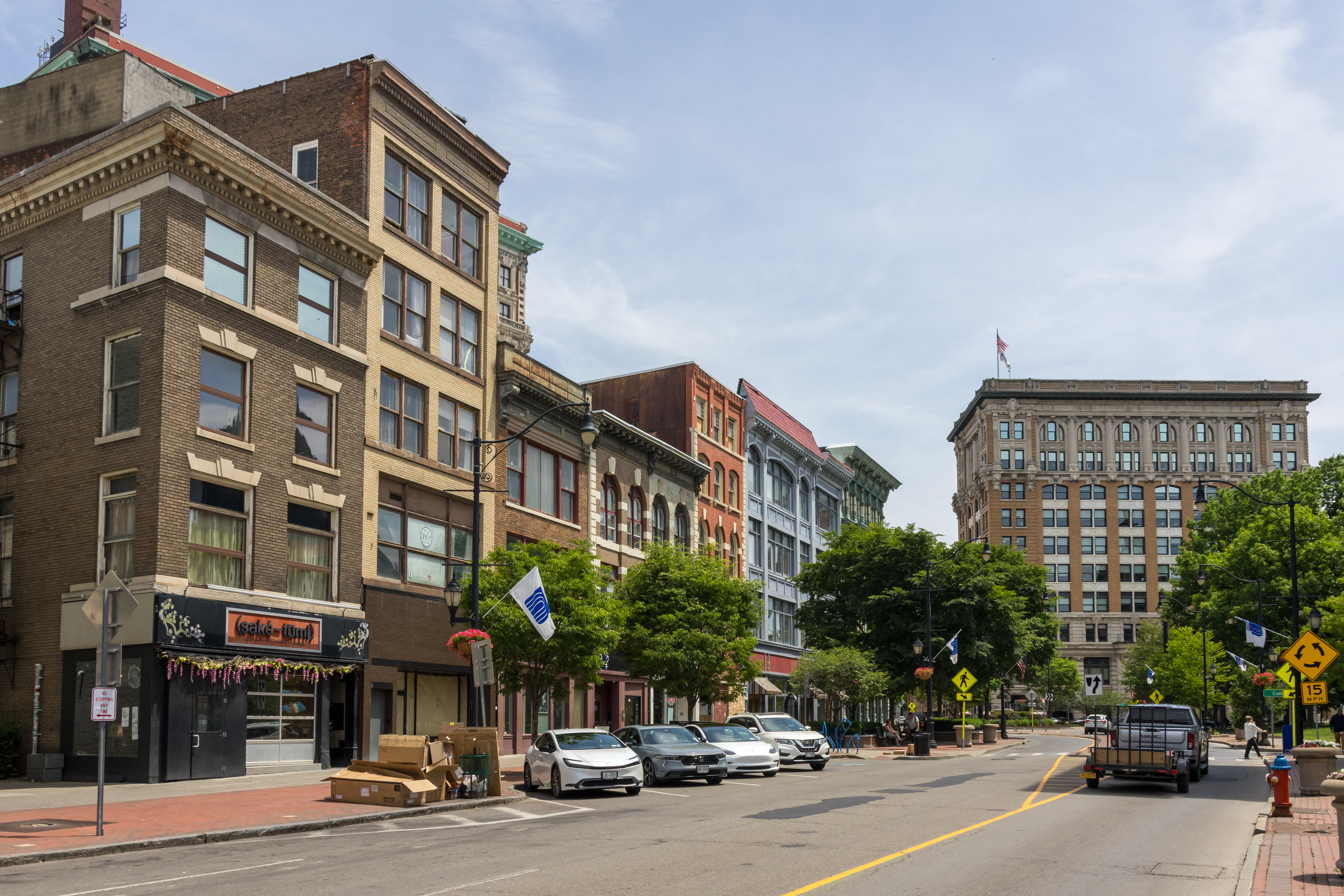
- Court Street in Downtown Binghamton

- Location within New York Location within the United States
- Coordinates: 42°5′55.5″N 75°54′58.39″W
- Country: United States of America
- State: New York
- County: Broome
- City: Binghamton

Government
  - City Councilor: Conrad Taylor (D) District 4
  - County Legislator: Jason T. Garnar (D) District 3
- Zip Code: 13901
- Area code: 607
- Website: http://www.cityofbinghamton.com

Downtown Binghamton is a neighborhood in Binghamton, New York, located on the north bank of the Susquehanna River, just east of its confluence with the Chenango River. It is the business and administrative center of the City of Binghamton, the Greater Binghamton area and Broome County.

Downtown Binghamton can be defined as encompassing the area north of the Susquehanna River, east of the Chenango River, west of Brandywine Avenue (NY-7) and south of the Norfolk Southern tracks.

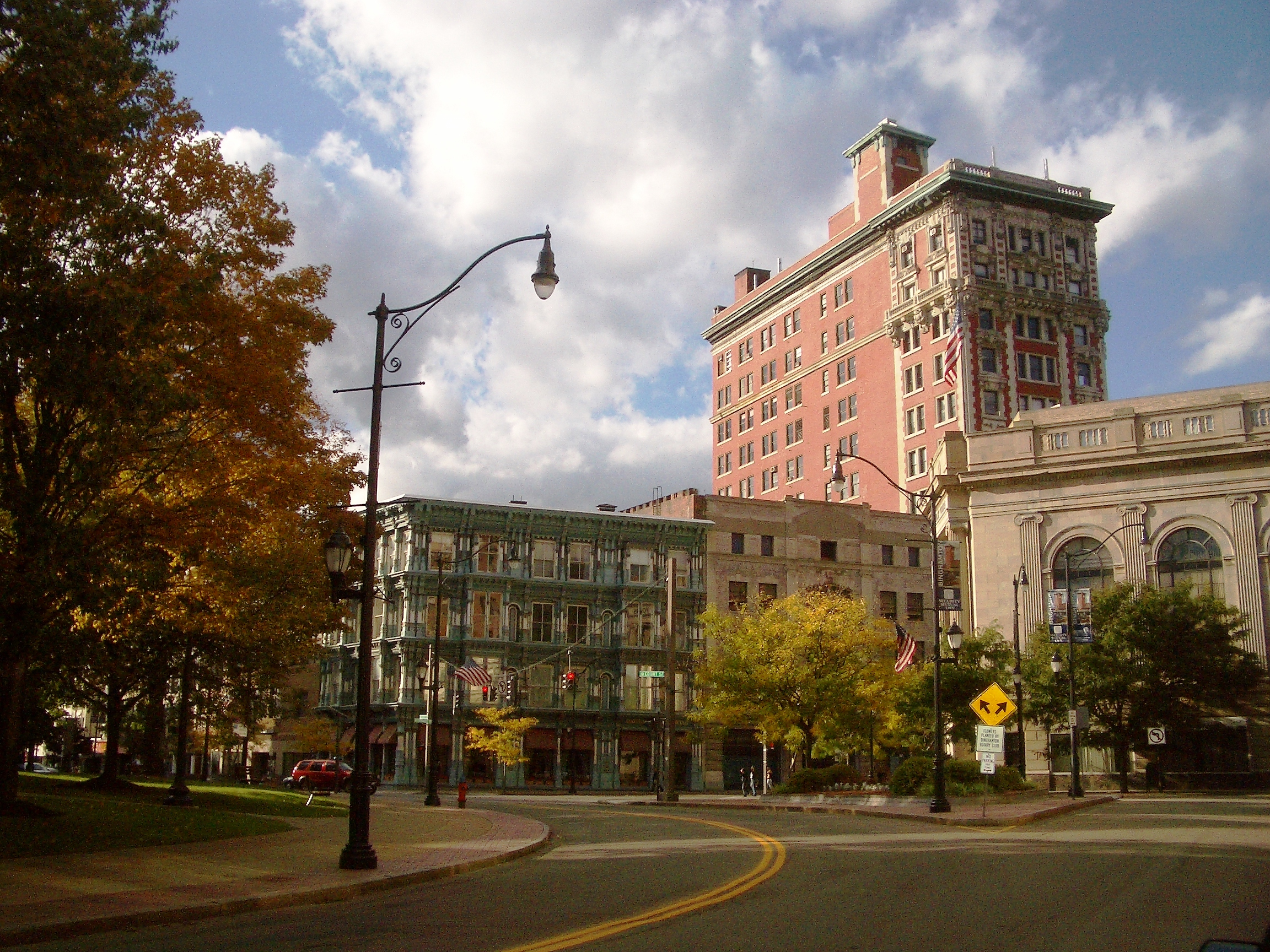
The intersection of Court, Chenango and Exchange streets

Downtown is the business and administrative center of the city and region. It is home to the principal state, county and city offices, which are located within Government Plaza on Hawley Street between State and Isbell streets. Important commercial streets include Chenango, Court, Hawley, State and Washington streets.

BC Junction, Broome County Transit's point of departure for the majority of its fixed routes, is located on the corner of Henry Street and Prospect Avenue in this neighborhood.
