= Manga iconography =

Visual language of Japanese manga

A page from the Marmalade Boy manga, volume 1 (Japanese version)

Japanese manga has developed a visual language or iconography for expressing emotion and other internal character states. This drawing style has also migrated into anime, as many manga are adapted into television shows and films and some of the well-known animation studios are founded by manga artists.

In manga, the emphasis is often placed on line over form, and the storytelling and panel placement differ from those in Western comics. Impressionistic backgrounds are common, as are sequences in which the panel shows details of the setting rather than the characters. Panels and pages are typically read from right to left, consistent with traditional Japanese writing.

Iconographic conventions in manga are sometimes called manpu (漫符, manga effects) (Note: Rousmaniere, Nicole (2019-01-28). "An introduction to Manga". The British Museum blog. How do you read manga?. Archived from the original on 2019-03-30. (quoted from Kono (2018)): spinning symbol (p14 in the book)) (or mampu (Note: "GIGA TOWN in TERA TOWN". Kyoto International Manga Museum. Kyoto. Archived from the original on 2020-10-27. (quoted from Kono (2018). Web page is in English but explanations are in Japanese}): (p10 in the book) upward droplets: (1)panicking (2)crying (bawling); (p33 in the book) ZZZ: wikt:zzz from English cartoons; (_p7 in the book) dust: roaming around)).

However, not all manga artists adhere to the conventions most popularized in the West through series such as Akira, Sailor Moon, Dragon Ball, and Ranma ½.

== Panel characteristics ==
There are several expressive techniques typical to the manga art form:

- Screentone: Transparent adhesive sheets manufactured with a distinctive pattern (typically, some form of dots or hatching, but also including a variety of flashy effects like stars or explosions, or commonplace scenes such as cityscapes, schoolyards, and natural landscapes), these are cut out and overlapped on the panel to introduce shading and detail that would be time-consuming or unfeasible to draw by hand. Increasingly, physical tone sheets are being replaced by computer-generated equivalents.
- Expressive dialogue bubbles: The borders of the speech/thought bubbles change in pattern/style to reflect the tone and mood of the dialogue. For example, an explosion-shaped bubble for shouting, (Note: Kono, Fumiyo (2018-01-19). Gigataun manpuzufu ギガタウン 漫符図譜 [Giga town: album of manga symbols] (in Japanese). Tokyo: Asahi Shimbun Publications. ISBN 9784022515124.: Web preview: Kono, Fumiyo. ギガタウン 漫符図譜. manga preview (in Japanese). Asahi Shimbun Publications. Archived from the original on 2020-02-03.; A dictionary of 104 manga symbols with short descriptions and strip cartoon examples. Appendix included brief explanation of several bubble speeches and background effects. Many characters in the examples are based on the ancient Japanese comical picture scroll Chōjū-jinbutsu-giga, hence "giga town".; (__p9 in the book) (1)droplet (2)sweat/feeling guilty; tears/feeling sorry; (_p18 in the book) speed lines; (_p24 in the book) having a pale face; (_p25 in the book) blushing; (_p34 in the book) morning; (_p35 in the book) dusk; (_p49 in the book) (1)fainting (2)shocked (3)appalled; (_p65 in the book) expense; (_p85 in the book) love letter; (p112 in the book) (1)uneasy (2)steamingly blushing) or an angry exclamation. Manga usually follows the normal Western comic conventions for speech (solid arc extending from the character's head) and thought bubble (several small circles used in place of the arc). The latter bubble style is sometimes used for whispered dialogue in manga.
- Speed lines: Often in action sequences, the background will possess an overlay of neatly ruled lines to portray direction of movements. Speed lines can also be applied to characters as a way to emphasize the motion of their bodies (limbs in particular). This style, especially background blurs, extends into most action based anime as well. Converging speed lines can be used to emphasize focus, as if the camera were quickly dollying toward the subject.
- Mini flashbacks: Many artists employ copies of segments from earlier chapters (sometimes only a single panel) and edit them into the story panels to act as a flashback (also applying an overlay of darker tone to differentiate it from current events). This is a convenient method to evoke prior events along with visual imagery. In situations where a character's life events flash across his/her mind, a splash page may be used with the entire background consisting of segments from earlier chapters.
- Abstract background effects: These involve elaborate hatching patterns in the background and serve to indicate or strengthen the mood of the plot. It can also illustrate a character's state of mind. A few examples:
  - Instead of conveying quick motion, speed lines can be used to dramatize a character's determination, high spirit, argumentative or combative mood, etc.
  - Dense gauze or cross-hatch patches or contours for a mysterious, ominous mood, etc.
  - Thinly dotted or iconic (with heart shapes, animal shapes, spirals, etc.) screentone for a fun, jubilant mood.
  - Pitch-black background for a serious mood.

== Facial features ==
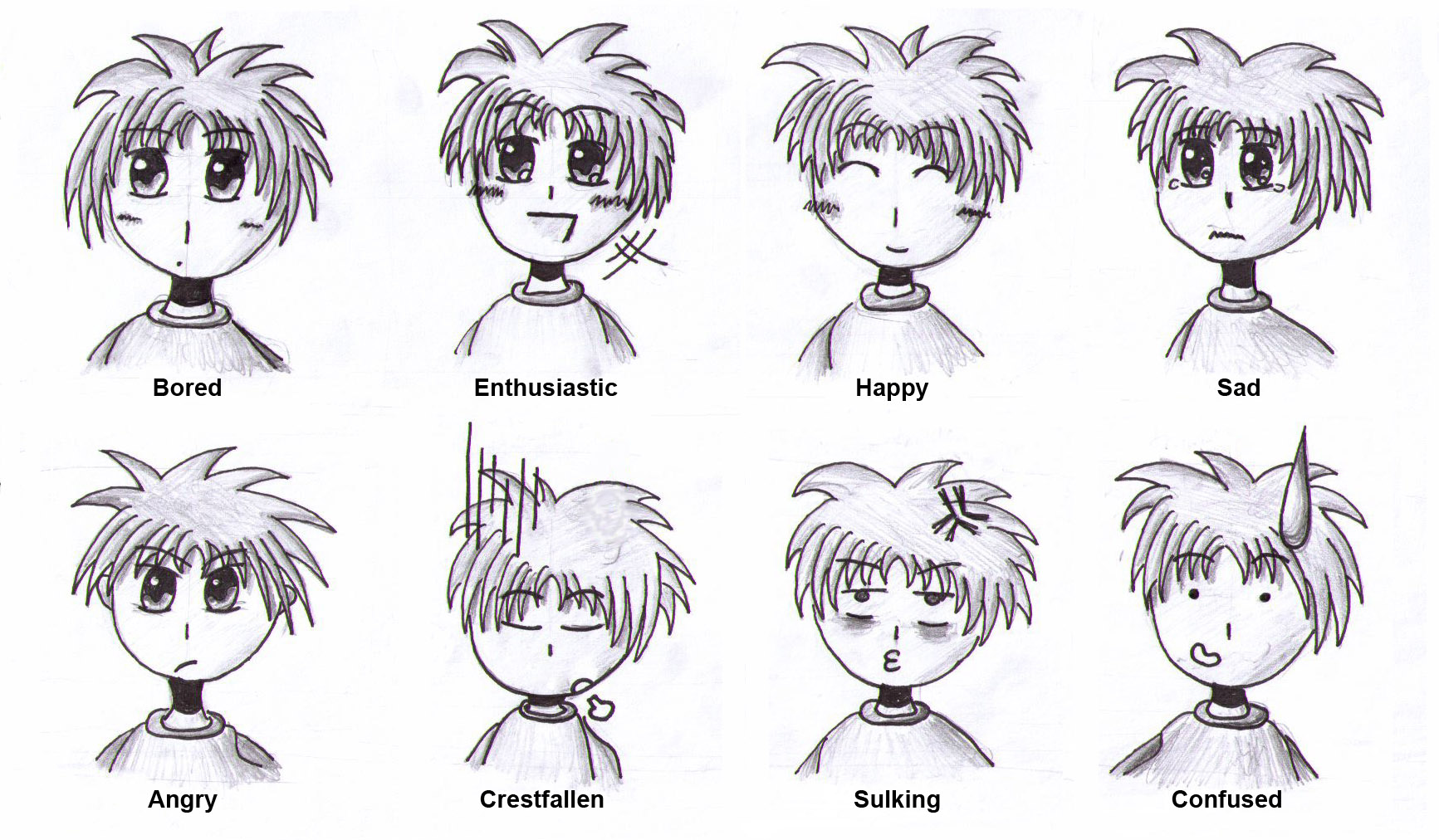
Range of facial expressions typically depicted in manga

While the art can be realistic or cartoonish, characters often have large eyes (female characters usually have larger eyes than male characters), small noses, tiny mouths, and flat faces. Psychological and social research on facial attractiveness has pointed out that the presence of childlike, neotenous facial features increases attractiveness. Manga artists often play on this to increase the appeal of protagonists.

Certain visual symbols have been developed over the years to become common methods of denoting emotions, physical conditions and mood:

=== Eyes ===
Large eyes have become a permanent fixture in manga since the early 20th century, originating from shōjo magazines targeted towards teenage girls. The visual conventions of shōjo manga were heavily influenced by the illustrations published in these magazines, with works by illustrators Yumeji Takehisa, Jun'ichi Nakahara and Kashō Takabatake featuring female characters with large eyes.

Inside the big eyes, the transparent feeling of pupils and the glares, or small reflections in the corners of the eyes are often exaggerated, regardless of surrounding lighting, although they are only present in living characters: the eyes of characters who have died are the color of the iris, but darker. Sometimes this death effect is also used to indicate characters who are emotionless due to trauma or loss of conscious control because of possession (ghost, demon, zombie, magic, etc.). In characters with hair partially covering the face, the eyes that would otherwise be covered are often outlined to make them visible.

Eye shape can be exaggerated or changed altogether. Love-hearts and doe-eyes indicate an infatuation, while stars indicate that the character is star-struck. Spirals indicate dizziness or overwhelming confusion, while flames or wide empty semicircles indicate that the character is angry or vengeful. When dead, unconscious or stunned, "X X" sometimes used as an indication of the state, comically or euphemistically. A single large "X" to represent both eyes means crying rigorously, or death, comically. Eyes may be replaced with "> <" to represent a variety of emotions, such as nervousness, embarrassment, or excitement. Eyes without pupils and with reflective glints indicate a state of delirium.

Enlargement of the eyes, where they become huge and perfectly round with tiny pupils and no iris and going beyond the reach of the face (often shown with the mouth becoming like a stretched semicircle, the point of which extends past the chin) symbolises extreme excitement. Similarly, turning eyes into two thick half-circles, conveys a cute, delighted look (see Character design section below).

The character's eye shapes and sizes are sometimes symbolically used to represent the character. For instance, bigger eyes will usually symbolize beauty, innocence, or purity, while smaller, more narrow eyes typically represent coldness and/or evil. Completely blackened eyes (shadowed) indicates a vengeful personality or underlying deep anger. It could also indicate that someone's being a wise-guy type, particularly when accompanied by grinning. A character's eyes are shadowed regardless of the lighting in the room when they become angry, upset, something is wrong with them, or they are emotionally hurt. Bubbles forming in the corner of a child's or female character's eyes often indicate that the character is about to cry.

=== Mouth ===
Mouths are often depicted as small, usually rendered with one line on the face. A fang peeking from the corner of the mouth indicates mischief or feistiness (unless, of course, the character has fangs normally). A cat mouth (like a number "3" rotated 90° clockwise) replacing the character's normal mouth, and usually accompanied by larger eyes may also represent mischief or feistiness (a notable exception being Konata Izumi from Lucky Star, whose usual mouth shape is this).

=== Nose ===
Again, noses are often depicted as small, with only a brief L-shaped mark to locate them. With female characters, the nose can sometimes be removed completely when the character is facing forward. In profile, female noses are often button shaped, consisting of little more than a small triangle.

A nosebleed indicates sexual excitation following exposure to stimulating imagery or situation. It is based on a Japanese old wives' tale. A balloon dangling from one nostril (a "snot bubble") indicates sleep.

=== Head and face ===
Cruciform popping veins above eye on the left and large sweat drop above eye on the right with eyes closed and eyebrows curved indicating the person is both confused and annoyed by something another person has said

Sweat drops are a common visual convention. Characters are drawn with one or more prominent beads of sweat on their brow or forehead (or floating above the hair on characters whose back is turned). This represents a broad spectrum of emotions, including embarrassment, exasperation, confusion, dismay and shock, not all of which are necessarily considered to be sweat-inducing under normal conditions. Actual physical perspiration in manga is signified by even distribution of sweat drops over the body, occasionally on top of clothing or hair.

A red cheek or hatchings on the cheek represents blushing, usually used when embarrassed by romantic feelings, while oval "blush dots" on the cheeks represent rosy cheeks. This can sometimes be confused with a scribble on the cheek, indicating injury. Sometimes when the character is expressing strong emotions, such as sadness, a long blush through the nose would appear.

Facial shape changes depend on the character's mood, and can look from round apple-shaped to a more subtle carrot shape.

Parallel vertical lines with dark shading over the head or under the eye may represent mortification, fatigue, or horror. If the lines are wavy, they may represent disgust. A far cuter way to represent frustration/mortification is (mainly for female/young female characters) that they tend to puff out their cheeks while their line is delivered in a gruff voice, an elongated "3" showing puffed lips, to emphasize that puffed look.

=== Anger symbol ===
Throbbing "cross popping" veins, usually depicted as a hollow cruciform in the upper head region, indicate anger or irritation. These shapes can sometimes be exaggerated, and placed on top of hair when the character is facing away from the viewer. Further throbs indicate additional anger. This anger symbol has a red color and four red lines.

The cross popping veins symbol was added to Unicode 6.0 as an emoji (💢) in 2010 with the name "anger symbol" and the code U+1F4A2. It is typically rendered with a bright red color.

Older manga such as Doraemon use smoke puffs to represent anger rather than the vein insignia.

== Character design ==
To better elicit a more emotional response with the audience for a certain character, a manga artist or animator will sometimes use certain traits in the character's design. The most common features include youthfulness as a physical trait (younger age or pigtails) or as an emotional trait such as a naive or innocent outlook, a childlike personality, or some obvious sympathetic weakness the character works hard to correct (extreme clumsiness or a life-threatening disease) but never really succeeds to get rid of.

== Other artistic conventions ==
Other artistic conventions used in mainstream manga include:

- A round swelling, sometimes drawn to the size of baseballs, is a visual exaggeration of swelling from injury.
- A white cross-shaped bandage symbol denotes pain.
- In older manga, eyes pop out to symbolize pain, as shown in Dragon Ball.
- Thick black lines around the character may indicate trembling due to anger, shock or astonishment. This is usually accompanied by a rigid pose or super deformed styling.
- Sparks literally fly between the eyes of two characters when they are fighting, or simply glaring at each other (in this case, their eyes may also be connected by a lightning streak).
- A character suddenly falling onto the floor, usually with one or more extremities twisted above themselves, is a typically humorous reaction to something unexpected happening.
- All facial features shrinking, the nose disappearing, the character sometimes lifting off the floor and the limbs being multiplied as if moving very fast symbolizes panic; if the same but with larger facial features it symbolizes comic rage or shock. Some may come with a yellow spark like symbol near their head.
- Exaggerated facial features signify anger. Examples such as star-like eyes with dark shading surrounding them while the face is framed by a red and black background imply comedic and/or understated rage. Others may include blank circular eyes with slanted eyebrows, also include triangle eyes is used for when the characters becoming angry and a square jaw with sharp teeth or even burning eyes with gritted teeth.
- Tear drops cascading down from the eyes or forming a twin fountain indicate either intense joy or sadness.
- An ellipsis appearing over a character's head indicates a silence, implying that something is going unsaid.
- A drooping head may indicate sorrow or depression. Some may come with lines drawn of the hunched character or over their eyes. Variations with wavy lines and white circular eyes can imply embarrassment.
- More often than not, character colorizations tend to represent the character in some way. A more subdued character will be colored with lighter tones, while a flamboyant character will be done in bright tones. Similarly, villains are often colored in darker tones, while colder characters will be given neutral tones (black, white, gray, etc.).
- Characters push their index fingers together when admitting a secret or telling the truth to another.
- An odd white shape (more often than not, something close to a mushroom) that appears during an exhale represents a sigh of awkward relief or depression.
- A wavy ghost coming out of the mouth is often a comical representation of depression, mortification, or a comedic and figurative death. This is a reference to the hitodama, as is the above example.
- Cherry blossoms indicate a sweet or beautiful moment. This is a reference to Mono no aware.
- A flower blossom falling off its stem may indicate death or, more commonly, loss of virginity.
- Unbound hair may represent freedom, while hair that is tied back may represent some form of either literal, figurative or emotional enslavement of some kind.
- Sleeping people may be indicated by having a bubble coming out of the nose, said bubble inflating and deflating as they snore. This is usually done when the character sleeps at an inappropriate moment (e.g. during class, at work, outside, in public, in an unusual pose or location, etc.).
- Sometimes, when a character screams or is surprised, they will do The Scream pose.
- Twitching eyebrows or eyelids may indicate anger or shock that the character is holding back.
- Negative imagery or rapidly dilating eyes often indicates either severe shock or a severe psychological effect.
- The image of something cracking or shattering often signifies either death or a serious event.
- Dark shading over the eyes or the eyes' omission while showing the face often suggest a silent or sullen disposition.
- Twinkling or star-like eyes with a smile often signify excitement while heart-shaped eyes imply immediate attraction to someone or something.
- A serious bloody nose (often mimicking a waterfall) often indicates a romantic or infatuated reaction from male characters.
- A character with white eyes, a stern look, and a dark atmosphere around them can imply barely concealed rage at someone or something.
- Suddenly changing the character's eyes into Valentine hearts can also indicate that they are madly in love with another character.
- Smoke or steam coming out of the character's nose indicates that the character is aroused.
- When one character sharply criticized or brings up a topic that is quite sensitive to another character, the impact of their words are sometimes symbolically shown by having their word bubble form an arrow that metaphorically pierces the other person they are talking to.
- The panel turns red with speeding background effects and the angered character grows large while yelling at the character(s).
- Speed lines appear when the angry character strikes the character(s) in an exaggerating fashion.

== See also ==
- Bishōjo
- Chibi
- Comics vocabulary
- Cuteness in Japanese culture
- Emanata – in comics, unrealistic pictorial elements emanating from a character or object (e.g. a sweatdrop, question mark, etc.)
- Gekiga
- Glossary of anime and manga
- Grawlix
- Moe anthropomorphism
- Superflat
- The Lexicon of Comicana

== Bibliography ==
- Brient, Hervé, ed. (2010). Le manga au féminin: Articles, chroniques, entretiens et mangas. Éditions H. ISBN 978-2-9531781-4-2.
- Shamoon, Deborah (2012). Passionate Friendship: The Aesthetics of Girl's Culture in Japan. University of Hawaii Press. ISBN 978-0-82483-542-2.
