= Borgland =

Estate of sculptor Gutzon Borglum in Connecticut, US

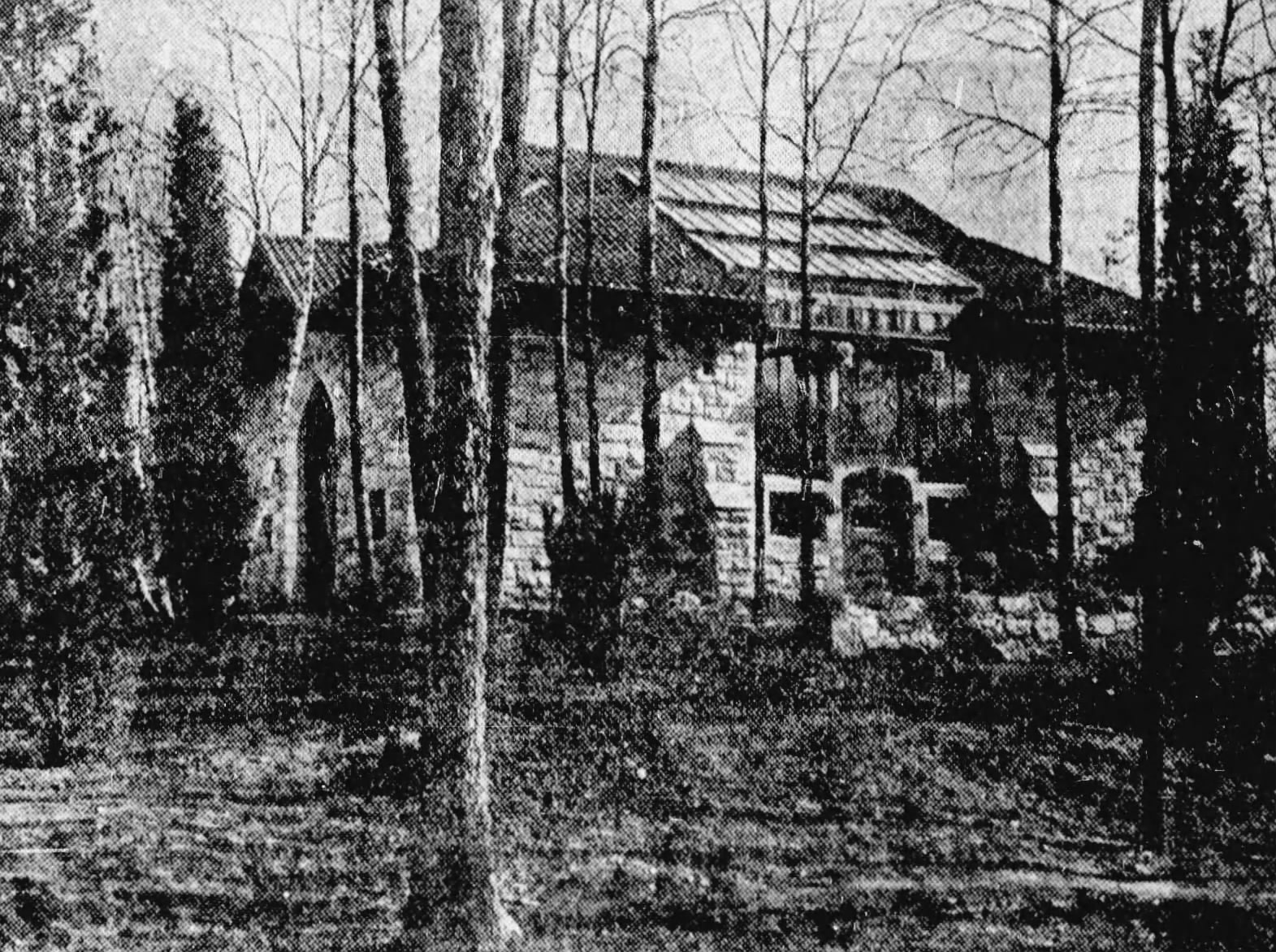
- Borglum's studio c. 1924

- Location within Connecticut

General information
- Type: Art studio
- Location: Stamford, Connecticut, United States
- Coordinates: 41.1098689°N 73.5550080°W
- Year built: c. 1918

Borgland was a 350-acre (140 ha) estate where sculptor Gutzon Borglum lived and worked in what is now suburban Stamford, Connecticut, United States. The estate included a primary house, log cabin, carriage house, stable and indoor and outdoor studios. Borglum used his estate in 1918 to train volunteers of the Czechoslovak Legion. The primary house he built on the site burned down in 1920. Following his death in 1941, the property has been subdivided and developed. Borglum's log cabin, carriage house and studio remain, albeit on separate tracts of land. The studio was used in the late 20th and early 21st centuries as a home and studio by syndicated cartoonist Mort Walker.

== Description ==
Borgland was located along Wire Mill Road and on both sides of the Rippowam River. Borglum dammed the river to create a pond. The dam was later destroyed—by a disgruntled downstream neighbor, according to Borglum's biographers—and not replaced. The studio was located about a mile from the primary house on the opposite side of the river. The property was strewn with large granite boulders.

The remnants of Borgland include a log cabin at 400 Wire Mill Road, a house expanded from the remaining carriage house at 546 Wire Mill Road, and Borglum's studio at 61 Studio Court. The walls of the studio were formed from pink granite cut from boulders on the site. The studio included a massive stone fireplace in one corner that could accommodate logs as long as 10 feet (3 m). Borglum went on to use similarly large fireplaces in future work spaces.

== History ==
Borglum and his second wife, Mary, bought land in Stamford after they moved to nearby Norwalk in 1903. They moved to the estate, which combined several pieces of land, as well as a farm. They called the combined estate "Borgland." The Borglums initially lived in a pre-existing farmhouse. Borglum built the studio c. 1918. He built the primary residence, carriage house and stable around 1920, although the house burned down. Borglum and his wife lived in the log cabin after the fire. Their children, including Lincoln Borglum, were raised at Borgland. Borgland attracted many prominent visitors, including Alexander Graham Bell, Isadora Duncan, Helen Keller, Ignacy Jan Paderewski, Auguste Rodin, Theodore Roosevelt and Wilbur and Orville Wright.

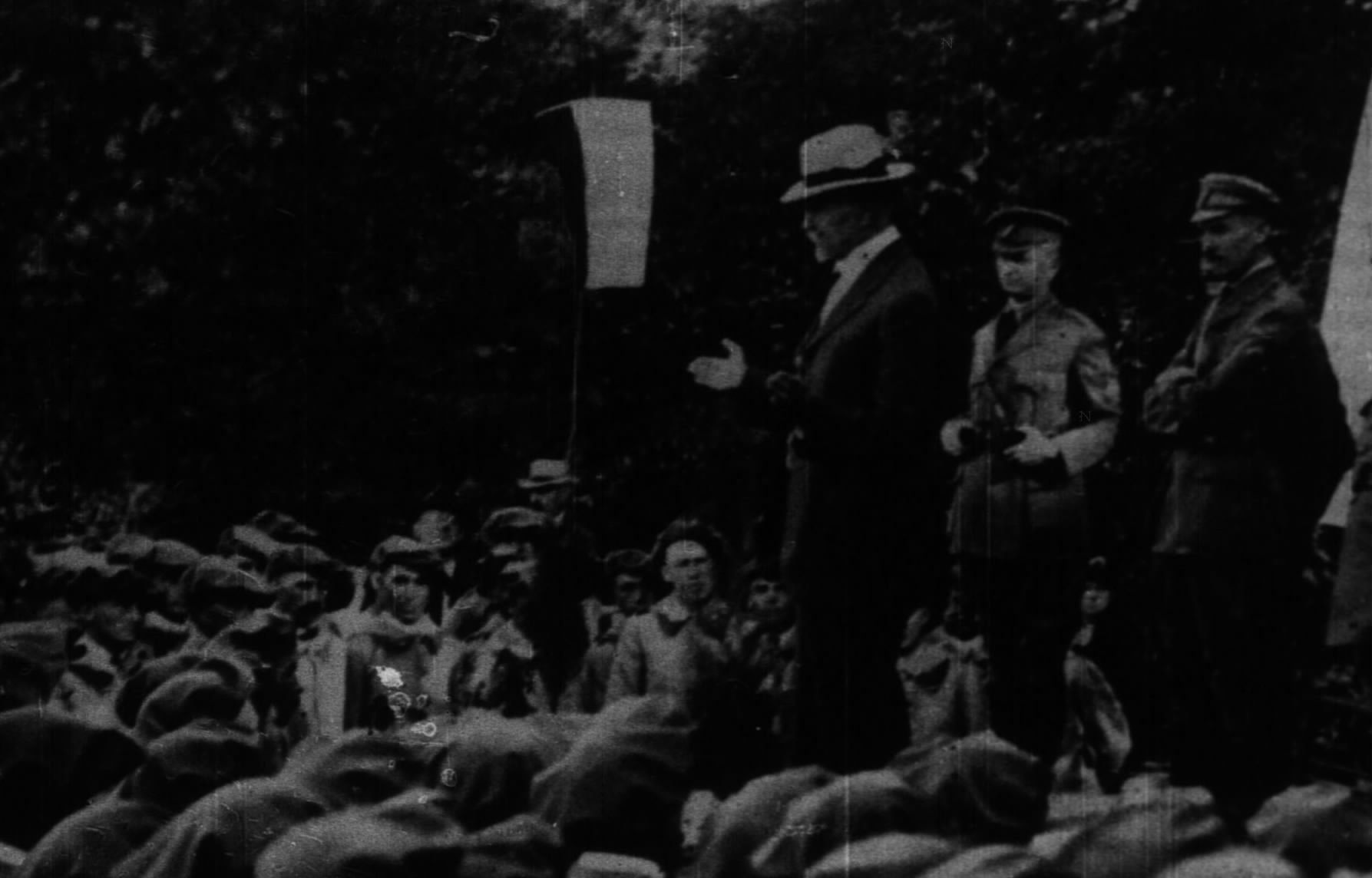
Masaryk addresses the Czechoslovak Legion at Borgland in September 1918.

In 1918, during World War I, one of Borglum's assistants working at Borgland was a Czech who was unable to travel to Europe to fight for Czechoslovak independence. Mary Borglum was sympathetic to this cause, and she and Gutzon arranged for a temporary training camp for the Czechoslovak Legion to be built at Borgland. Approximately 150 Czechoslovaks were trained at Borgland. Both Borglums became avid supporters of Czechoslovak independence. Along with Eliot Norton, the Borglums revised the Czechoslovak declaration of independence in July 1918 at the request of the secretary for nationalist leader Tomáš Masaryk, who spent much of 1918 in Washington, D.C., generating support for independence. (Of a number of declarations drafted in the wake of World War I, the Czechoslovak declaration of independence was the one most indebted to the U.S. Declaration of Independence.) Borglum also co-hosted a rally for Masaryk in New York City. Borglum also raised funds for the Legion and donated artwork for auction.

Masaryk visited Borgland in 1918 and addressed the legion members there. He had a falling out with Borglum, who criticized the lack of support for and oversight of the legion members training at Borgland; Borglum later wrote to Masaryk that his "interest in the Middle Europe is closed".

When Borglum began sculpting Mount Rushmore in 1927, the family relocated primarily to South Dakota. By the later 1930s, after many years of work on the monument, the aging Borglums no longer considered Borgland their primary residence and began to pursue the idea of subdividing it for development. However, financier Eugene Meyer, who held the mortgage and had been angry about his treatment by the Borglums when they had previously sought refinancing, declined to discuss development plans. Between Gutzon Borglum's death in 1941 and Mary Borglum's death in 1955, most of the Stamford property was sold.

In the 1980s, Beetle Bailey and Hi and Lois creator Mort Walker bought 61 Studio Court from David Burt, a local sculptor. Walker was drawn to Borglum's three-story studio space. He married his second wife, Catherine, in front of Borglum's massive stone fireplace, and the Walkers extensively altered the house. He owned it until his death in 2018. As of 2023, the studio was a gallery used by visual artist Stuart Yankell. Borglum's adjacent stone-walled outdoor studio was repurposed as a rental property and filming location.

Later developed into a residence, the carriage house property was put on the market in 2013 for $1.4 million. The log cabin was listed for sale in 2021 for over $1 million.
