= Jerry Dumas =

American comic strip artist (1930–2016)

- Born: Gerald John Dumas; June 6, 1930 Detroit, Michigan, U.S.
- Died: November 12, 2016 (aged 86) Greenwich, Connecticut, U.S.
- Areas: Artist, writer
- Notable works: Sam and Silo
- Awards: Full list

Signature
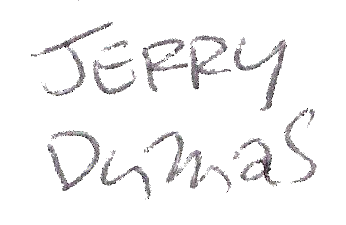

Gerald John Dumas (June 6, 1930 – November 12, 2016) was an American cartoonist, best known for his Sam and Silo comic strip. Dumas was also a writer, illustrator, and essayist, and a columnist for the Greenwich Time.

== Biography ==
Born in Detroit, Dumas started drawing cartoons when he was nine years old. In 1954, after serving in the Air Force and earning a degree in English from Arizona State University, he worked with cartoonist Walt Ditzen in Phoenix and contributed drawings to the State Press. In 1956 he moved to Greenwich, Connecticut to work for Mort Walker as a gag writer and illustrator on the comic strips Hi and Lois and Beetle Bailey.

Together with Walker, he created Sam's Strip in 1961, a metafictional satire of comics, featuring a lot of parodies of other comic characters. It only lasted until 1963 but was resurrected as Sam and Silo in 1977, still with Walker. Dumas continued the comic strip on his own from 1995 on. In 1968, he also collaborated on all aspects of the comic strip Boner's Ark. Apart from his work with Walker, Dumas also worked on other comic strips like Benchley with Mort Drucker and McCall of the Wild with Mel Crawford.

In addition to his comic strip work, Dumas created numerous illustrations and cartoons. First selling them to the local Teen magazine, he soon was published in magazines and newspapers like The Washington Post, The New Yorker and The New York Times. As a writer, he contributed essays to the Atlantic Monthly, the Smithsonian, and The Connoisseur. He authored the children's book Rabbits Rafferty, published in 1968, and his childhood memoir, An Afternoon in Waterloo Park, published in 1972.

Dumas lived in Greenwich, Connecticut, with his wife Gail, with whom he had three sons. He died on November 12, 2016, from neuroendocrine cancer at the age of 86.

== Awards ==
- 1971: A talented handball player, Dumas won numerous titles, including the New England championship in 1971.
- 1985: Adamson Award for his work on Sam's Strip and Sam and Silo
- 2005: Convocation Speaker of the Arizona State University College of Liberal Arts & Sciences
