= Sam and Silo =

American comic strip by Mort Walker and Jerry Dumas

- Author(s): Mort Walker (1977–1995); Jerry Dumas (1977–2016)
- Current status/schedule: Gag-a-day strip; reruns
- Launch date: April 18, 1977
- End date: c. 2017
- Syndicate(s): King Features Syndicate
- Publisher: Tempo Books
- Genre: Humor
- Preceded by: Sam's Strip

Sam and Silo is an American comic strip created by Mort Walker (creator of Beetle Bailey and Hi and Lois) and Jerry Dumas, which began on April 18, 1977. The series is a "continuation" or a spin-off of Sam's Strip (1961-1963), as it uses the same characters. Dumas was solely responsible for the strip from 1995 and drew it until his death in 2016.

== Overview ==
In 1961, Mort Walker and Jerry Dumas, who had worked together on Beetle Bailey and Hi and Lois, created Sam's Strip, in which the title character and his unnamed assistant were aware that they were in a comic strip. The series debuted as a daily-only on October 2 of that year and relied heavily on metahumor, appearances by classic comic strip characters, and breaking the fourth wall. It never reached more than sixty newspapers and was discontinued on June 1, 1963.

More than a decade later, Walker learned there was interest in reviving Sam's Strip, so he went to the president of King Features Syndicate, who suggested using the same characters with a different theme. The result was the more conventional gag-a-day strip Sam and Silo, and it premiered on April 18, 1977. The new strip followed the misadventures of a porkpie hat-wearing sheriff and his sole deputy in the small American community of Upper Duckwater, a place so safe that the pair can spend a lot of time napping in their squad car behind the billboard or enjoying hearty meals at the local diner, where Rosie (the "real mother" of the town) "dispenses one-liners and lots of affection along with breakfast, lunch, and dinner." Unfortunately, Sam and Silo must contend with the busybody Mayor McGuffey, who is often "seeing crime where there is none, or inventing bureaucratic red tape just for the fun of it."

The creators produced the strip together until 1995, when Walker stepped away, leaving the strip fully in Dumas' hands. There has been no Sunday installment since that time.

"Sam & Silo is just an ordinary comic strip," states Don Markstein's Toonopedia. "A little old-fashioned, perhaps; but...it's pretty typical of what you see all over the comics page." King Features themselves don't claim any more than that in their online introduction to the strip: "Sam and Silo...don’t attempt to solve the secrets of the universe. They don’t have profound ideas about politics or the economy or the communications revolution." As Toonopedia admits, while the strip has "none of the self-parodying zaniness that made Sam's Strip one of comics' little-known classics," it does have a loyal following that depends on it "to provide chuckles Monday through Saturday."

== Characters ==
- Sam, the inept sheriff of the leafy hamlet of Upper Duckwater.
- Silo, Sam’s right-hand man in law enforcement.
- Mayor McGuffey, a self-important little town politician.
- Rosie, the counterwoman at the local diner.
- Funny Floyd, a wild man who walks around barefoot, sometimes spouting incoherent poetry.
- Sister Agnes, an eccentric nun.
- Granny Naps, Sam’s cynical and no-nonsense landlady.
- Algy, the courthouse janitor who usually blows up things that he tries to fix.
- Mr. Teetering, a retired guy who supposedly can dispense wisdom.
- Buford, the Duckwater jail’s ever-escaping lone resident.
- Jasper, the court house cat.

== Books ==
Tempo Books released a paperback collection of Sam and Silo in 1979.
