= Sam's Strip =

American comic strip by Jerry Dumas and Mort Walker

- Author(s): Jerry Dumas, Mort Walker
- Current status/schedule: Ended
- Launch date: October 2, 1961
- End date: June 1, 1963
- Syndicate(s): King Features Syndicate
- Publisher: Fantagraphics Books
- Genre: Metacomic
- Followed by: Sam and Silo

Sam's Strip was a humorous comic strip created and produced by Mort Walker and Jerry Dumas. It was distributed by King Features Syndicate from October 2, 1961 to June 1, 1963. The series depended heavily on metahumor and appearances by famous comic-strip characters.

== Overview ==
In the late 1950s and early 1960s, Mort Walker and Jerry Dumas met on Monday mornings to go over the gag ideas they had worked up for future installments of Walker's strips Beetle Bailey and Hi and Lois. Just for fun, they started putting their considerable knowledge of comic-strip history to use in creating gags about characters from different strips and time periods meeting and interacting. An idea eventually came out of these exercises: What about a feature starring a guy who runs his own comic strip as a business? Walker, a fan of alliteration, came up with the title Sam's Strip. They split the gag writing, Dumas did the drawing, and Walker the lettering. When the pair took samples to Walker's regular distributor, King Features Syndicate, four executives barraged them with questions about the contents, but there was enough laughter that the editor finally gave the go-ahead. Sam's Strip debuted as a daily only on October 16, 1961.

Bulb-nosed, seemingly neckless Sam owned and operated the comic strip he inhabited, and both he and his bespectacled, unnamed assistant were aware of their fictional, artistic status. They commented on the elements of cartooning, talked to the readers, abused their artist (a fictionalized Dumas), and played with the stock in their Cartoon Prop Closet (which contained everything from idea bulbs and flying money to pain stars and angry thought bubbles), all the while trying any scheme to make their business a success. Along the way, they encountered strip stars such as Blondie and Charlie Brown, cult favorites like Krazy Kat and Ignatz Mouse, and old-timers such as Happy Hooligan and Tillie the Toiler. Dumas took pride in drawing each character's style exactly (there were no good copy machines at the time), but the job was intensely time-consuming. It took him three weeks to create a week's continuity about a comic characters convention that featured dozens of "guest stars."

This metahumor made fans of cartoonists and informed comics aficionados (and some editors), but the reading public was left scratching its collective head. As Walker admitted later, "the readers had to be familiar with the various characters we were satirizing before they could get the gag. It's a tough sell." Just as Sam struggled to make his strip a hit, his creators did the same, and Sam's Strip never gained more than sixty newspapers before being cancelled on June 1, 1963.

In 1977, Walker and Dumas reemployed Sam and his sidekick for a new strip with a "new" concept called Sam and Silo, about a pair of bumbling cops in a quiet little town. While not as imaginative or innovative (Don Markstein's Toonopedia calls it "just a typical comic strip"), it was far more popular. New Sam and Silo strips were still being produced, solely by Dumas, until his death in late 2016.

== Critical analysis ==
“Walker and Dumas clearly take pleasure in working in callbacks to classic comic strips [and] many of the metatextual gags are funny and fun," wrote The Comics Journal's Shaenon Garrity, adding that "Dumas’s drawings of classic comic-strip characters are excellent.” Andrew Williams of Den of Geek agreed that "the strips that chip away at the fourth wall in particular frequently raise a smile, and occasionally even a laugh." Comic Book Resources' Chad Nevett elaborated that "Walker and Dumas are very adept at making most of those jokes [featuring run-ins with other strip characters] work on two levels, where the character’s role is obvious to those unaware of its pre-existence, while those in the know will get an extra kick out of it." But Christopher Barat felt "that the creators didn't use [the] inter-strip get-togethers nearly as much as they should have. Instead, they whiled away a lot of their time with politically themed, time-dependent gags trading on the 'New Frontier' administration of John Kennedy and the contemporary Cold War atmosphere."

== Books ==
One paperback collection, Sam's Strip Lives!, was published in small quantities under the aegis of the Museum of Cartoon Art. In December 2008, Fantagraphics Books released a 208-page paperback book containing the entire run of Sam's Strip. It includes brief introductions by Dumas and Walker, unpublished sketches, original artwork, photographs, and sales brochures. Plus there are select annotations by Dumas and comics historian Brian Walker. "These strips aren't perfect and some gags are repeated far too many times," wrote Chad Nevett, "but this collection made me laugh at least once on nearly every page. ... Once again, Fantagraphics delivers a stellar package." Andrew Williams' review agreed with that last statement: "[T]he near-flawless execution of the book helps to make it feel like more of a prestige package, a celebration of the series rather than just a cheap cash-in. ... Although the book will largely be bought by fans of the series, it's still accessible for absolute newcomers." KC Carlson of Comics Worth Reading stated, "If you ever had more than a passing interest in newspaper strips, you owe it to yourself to check out this collection."
