= Hägar the Horrible =

American comic strip

- Author: Dik Browne (1973–88); Browne Creative Enterprises (2017-)
- Current status/schedule: Running
- Launch date: February 4, 1973; 53 years ago
- Syndicate(s): King Features Syndicate
- Genre(s): Humor, Gag-a-day

Hägar the Horrible is the title and main character of an American comic strip created by cartoonist Dik Browne and syndicated by King Features Syndicate. It first appeared on February 4, 1973 (in Sunday papers) and the next day in daily newspapers, and was an immediate success. Following Browne's retirement in 1988, his son Chris Browne continued the strip until his 2017 retirement, with artwork by Gary Hallgren. Currently, it is written and drawn by staff members of Browne Creative Enterprises, run by Bob Browne and his sister Tsuiwen "Sally" Browne-Boeras, the two surviving children of Dik Browne. As of 2010, Hägar is distributed to 1,900 newspapers in 56 countries and translated into 12 languages. The strip is a caricature, commenting on modern-day life in the US through a loose interpretation of Viking Age Scandinavian life.

== Origin ==
"Hagar the Terrible" was the nickname given to the late Dik Browne by his sons; Browne adapted the name to Hägar the Horrible for alliteration. After his death, Dik Browne's sons changed the title of the strip to Dik Browne's Hägar the Horrible in tribute. The name is pronounced Hay-gar (IPA: /heɪˈɡɑːr/), according to Chris Browne.

Hägar (sometimes written "Hagar") is a shaggy, scruffy, overweight, red-bearded Viking. He regularly raids England, and sometimes France. Animation-industry writer Terence J. Sacks notes the juxtaposition of contrary qualities that make Hägar endearing to the reader: "Hägar's horned helmet, rough beard and shaggy tunic make him look somewhat like a caveman or Opera-Viking, but you also know Hägar has a soft underbelly occasionally exposed."

=== Setting and format ===
The strip is set in the Middle Ages in an unnamed coastal village somewhere in Norway. Hägar's Norwegian lineage was revealed at least once in a daily strip (July 18, 1984). His son, Hamlet, asks Hägar if he can tell people they're Norwegian. Hägar replies that it isn't necessary: "It might sound like bragging."

Although anachronisms occur, they are not deliberate mainstays of the strip, as in other period burlesque strips like The Wizard of Id. The strip follows a standard gag-a-day daily format with an extended color sequence on Sundays.

Much of the humor centers around Hägar's interactions with his longship crew, especially "Lucky Eddie" (when on voyages or during periodic sacking and looting raids). Sometimes the humor would be at the tavern with the other Vikings, or Hagar dealing with his family, who are not like stereotypical Vikings. Supporting characters include: his overbearing, nagging, and occasionally jealous wife, Helga; their brilliant and sensitive son, Hamlet; their pretty but domestically hopeless daughter, Honi; Helga's pet duck, Kvack; Hägar's loyal and clever dog, Snert; and other secondary, recurring characters.

=== Illustration style ===
Hägar the Horrible uses a clear, sparse, editorial style of line drawing, with minimal foreground or background detail, shading, or embellishment. Observers argue this is likely derived from Dik Browne's experience as a courtroom illustrator and illustrator of maps of important World War II battles before 1942, plus his experience as an illustrator (Staff Sergeant) attached to a U.S. Army Engineer unit, where he drew technical diagrams, maps, and other documents requiring very clear depictions.

Before Hägar, Browne was best-known for co-creating the comic strip Hi and Lois with his partner Mort Walker, who also created the comic strip Beetle Bailey. Browne was reportedly the real-life inspiration for the character "Plato", the intellectual private in Beetle Bailey.

=== Cast of characters ===
Dik Browne based the characters on his family. His son Chris recalled: "And he was a big man like me. He was three hundred pounds [136 kg] and six feet two [1.88 m] and had a flaming red beard."

Hägar the Horrible characters (l. to r.): Snert, Hamlet, Helga, Hägar, Honi, Kvack

- Hägar the Hörrible: the slovenly, overfed Viking protagonist. Hägar is both a fierce warrior and a family man with the same problems as your average modern suburbanite. One running gag involves his exceptionally poor personal hygiene; for example, his annual bath (July 14) is a time of national rejoicing and celebrations. Another source of comedy is Hägar's simplistic, childlike cluelessness, often finding himself at odds with his more sensible family members. Much to Hägar's chagrin, on the few occasions where he behaves maturely (such as helping Helga in daily tasks or displaying self-control of his titanic appetite), the other characters are often caught off guard, since they are more accustomed to his bumbling and childish attitude. The most notable example was when Helga demanded that Hägar speak the truth at least one time, Hägar agrees and does so, something that pleasantly surprises even God himself, who promptly makes angels play the trumpets in celebration of this "miracle".
- Helga: Hägar's large-framed, bossy housewife, dressed in operatic, Brünnhilde-like blonde braids and helmet. She is the quintessential maternal "over-mothering" figure. Helga bickers with Hägar over his poor habits—such as forgetting to wash his hands after pillaging, or not wiping his feet before entering the hovel. She is often seen trying to teach her old-fashioned values to her daughter Honi, although Honi never truly "gets" it. Her formidable appearance is based on that of a Wagnerian Valkyrie.
- Lucky Eddie: Hägar's first mate, best friend, and lieutenant in Viking raids. Contrary to popular depictions of Vikings as brawny macho warriors, Eddie is a short, skinny, chinless, awkward, and naïve weakling. The ironically-named "Lucky" Eddie is, in fact, so unlucky he can be crushed by a stray rainbow. He wears a funnel rather than a helmet on his head, which he always keeps on because he's afraid of squirrels. Unlike Hägar, Eddie is educated enough to be able to read and speak in other languages, but, paradoxically, this does not give him much advantage over other Vikings or his enemies.
- Hamlet: Hägar and Helga's intelligent, clean, obedient, and studious young son is almost always seen reading a book. He shows no interest in becoming a Viking. He wants to be a dentist, which makes him the shame of the family to Hägar, but Helga and Honi are more tolerant and encourage his education. Even when Hägar forces him to practice his Viking skills, he's shown to be terrible at them. He is the victim of his would-be girlfriend Hernia's unrequited affection.
- Honi: Hägar and Helga's beloved, beautiful, sweet, cheerful 16-year-old daughter—dressed as a young Valkyrie with a winged helmet, metallic breastplate and a long skirt made of chainmail. Honi takes after Hägar's side of the family, a fact that her boyfriend Lute sometimes finds intimidating. She's a Viking warrior like her father, her weapons of choice are a spear and shield. However, she's clueless about traditional "girlish" things, and tends to be overdramatic. Helga is constantly trying to marry her off, as she's seen as an "old maid" in their backward community. She was romantically involved with Lute the balladeer from the very beginning, and is the only character that can endure his terrible singing.
- Lute: an inept bard/minstrel/troubadour who can neither play, sing in tune nor rhyme properly, although Lute remains totally oblivious to everyone else's perception, and considers himself quite the talent. He is Honi's boyfriend, but Honi is in control of their relationship (similar to Helga and Hägar); they are perpetually engaged, although they still haven't married. His name is in reference to the stringed instrument of the same name, which he is often seen playing (albeit poorly). They broke up.
- Hernia: a young, tomboyish girl deeply infatuated with the sensitive Hamlet, but her love is unrequited, often to her comically melodramatic dismay.
- Snert: Hägar's dog; Snert is supposed to be a bird/hunting dog, but the reader gets the impression that most of the time he just doesn't feel like working. Snert understands everything Hägar tells him, but usually refuses to do what he's told. Sometimes Snert is depicted as having a "wife" and a couple of puppies, but they hardly play any role in the comic. Snert wears a (miniature) Viking helmet like everyone else in Hägar's household—including the pets. Snert barks with a Viking accent ("voof").
- Kvack: the family's German duck. Kvack is Helga's friend and confidante; she will usually spy on Hägar and quack loudly whenever he does something he's not supposed to, such as having another hogshead of "Glögg" (Note: Also gløg) or "Wiffleberry wine", Hägar's frequently-imbibed beverages. Obviously, Hägar doesn't like Kvack at all, and would like to get rid of her. Being a German duck, Kvack "quacks" with an accent. Later in the strip, she brought home a litter of ducklings, which Helga "mothers" as if they were human grandchildren.
- Dr. Zook: a cowled, druid-like "physician" who gives primarily nutritional and psychiatric advice, and is a notorious and dangerous quack. He wears a hood that conceals his face except for his long nose which sticks out. On a few occasions, his face has at least partially been seen.
- Helga's Father: a geriatric Viking whose beard reaches the floor, with a taste for young women.
- Helga's Mother: a stereotypically shrewish mother-in-law, with antlers on her helmet.
- The Tax Collector: The King's officious emissary. In a running gag, he occasionally shows up accompanied by a soldier with a battle-axe, saying: "We're here to collect a special one-time tax for the King." Of course, this happens every time Hagar earns so much as a penny.
- Mr. Giggles: a torturer who torments captives by forcible tickling.
- Koyer the Lawyer: an unpleasant but effective barrister.
- The Executioner: often accompanies the Tax Collector.
- Brother Olaf: a monk who unsuccessfully explains to Hägar the concept of sin.

Other recurring minor characters include an unnamed psychic or soothsayer, whom Honi and Hägar regularly consult, a balding waiter at Helga's favorite restaurant, "The King of England", and various Anglo-Saxon raiders who serve as Hägar's friends and rivals, such as Dirty Dirk and Mean Max.

The following sequence is an example of a strip that highlights Hägar's good intentions but accompanying cluelessness:

- Hägar returns from looting Paris with a present for his wife, Helga.
- He tells her it was ripped off a tub in a palace.
- He then turns on the faucet and eagerly encourages her to watch.
- When nothing happens, Hägar comments: "That's funny, when I turned it on in the palace, water came out."

== Licensing ==
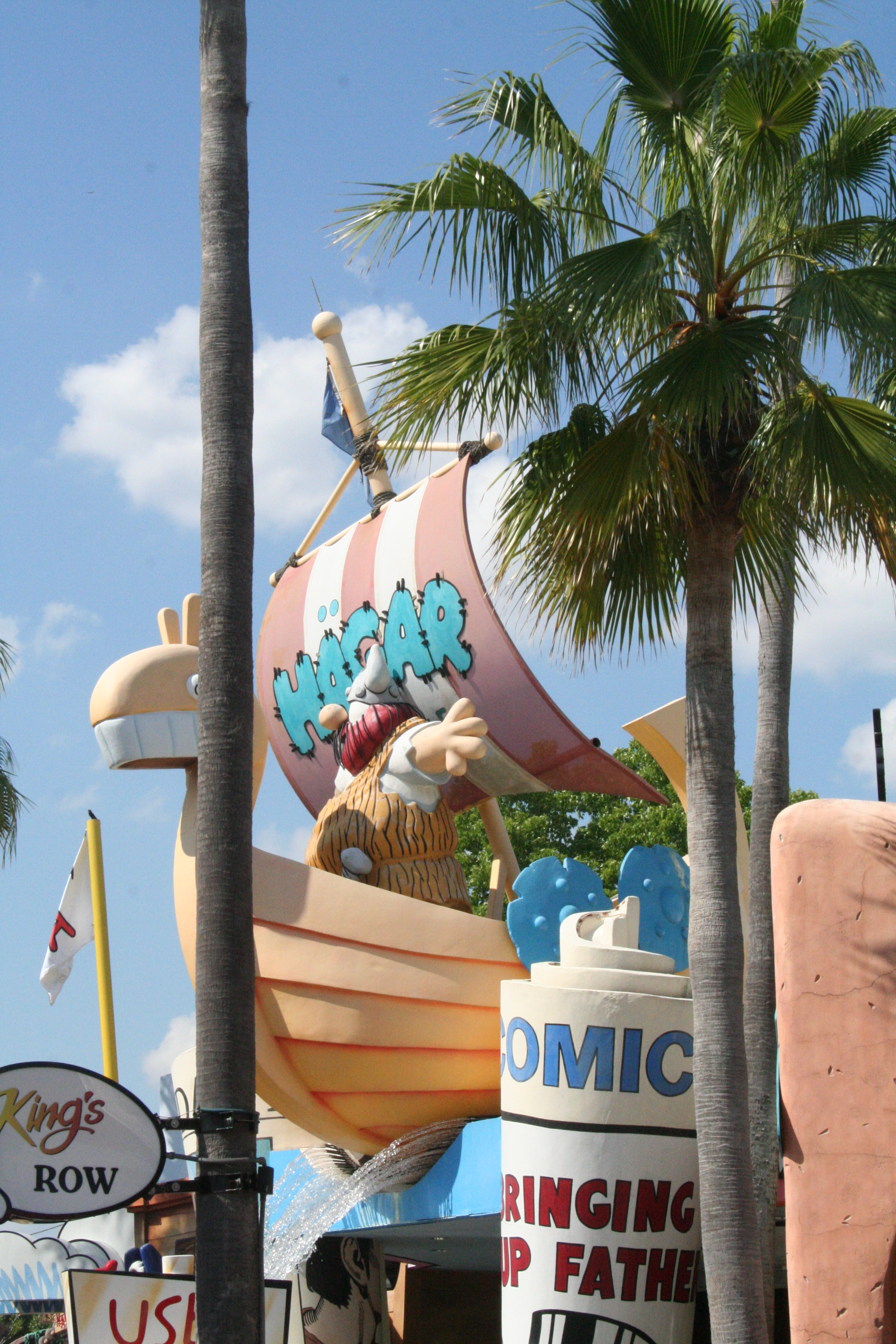
Hägar-themed gift shop at Islands of Adventure theme park in Florida

- For a brief time in the 1970s, Hägar the Horrible had its own brand of sponsored soda, "Sunday Funnies Cola", which featured Hägar strips printed on the side of the can. It was considered a marketing failure.
- From 1981 until the mid-1990s, a representation of Hägar served as the mascot for the Cleveland State University Vikings.
- In the UK in the late 1980s, Hägar and other characters from the strip were used to advertise Skol Lager beer, produced in Great Britain by Allied Breweries. Hägar appeared on billboards and in a series of popular television commercials. The TV spots were animated and mainly black and white, as per the daily newspaper comic strip, although the actual product always appeared in color.
- From 1989 to 1991, Hägar would once again be used in a soft drink endorsement in a series of radio and TV ads for Mug Root Beer, to far greater success than the Sunday Funnies Cola campaign. Most of the TV ads for Mug were the same ads that had premiered for Skol Lager in the UK, albeit recolored and redubbed to refer to root beer rather than beer.
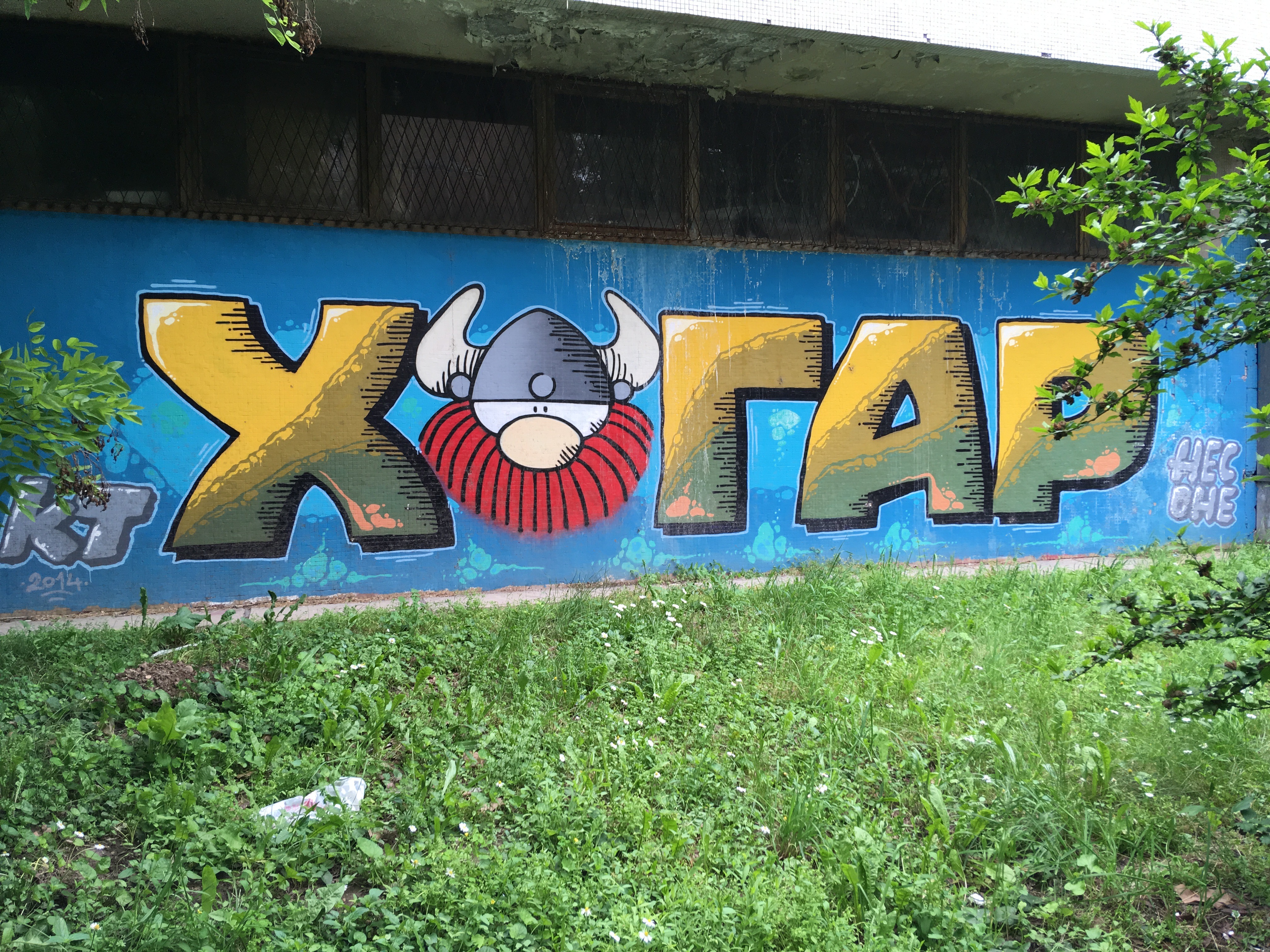
- Hägar the Horrible mural in New Belgrade
  In the early 1990s, Hägar was used in print ads for the IBM RISC System/6000 desktop workstation. "The ads equated the machine's unprecedented desktop power with that of the conquering hordes."

=== TV guest appearances ===
Hägar made his first animated appearance in a brief sketch paired with an interview with creator Dik Browne in the special The Fantastic Funnies broadcast on CBS May 15, 1980. Scott Beach (uncredited) provided the voice while the animation was produced by Bill Melendez and Lee Mendelson.

A live-action Hägar sketch was included in the special Mother's Day Sunday Funnies broadcast May 8, 1983 on NBC.

=== TV special ===
On November 1st, 1989, an animated television special, Hägar the Horrible: Hägar Knows Best, produced by Hanna-Barbera, aired on CBS, based on the strip's first plotline in 1973. Hägar returns home from two years of battles—and faces a major culture shock. His son Hamlet has flunked from the Viking Academy, and his daughter Honi is dating a minstrel named Lute instead of Olaf, because unlike Lute, Olaf is a true Viking. Hägar blames Helga for allowing Honi to date Lute and being okay with Hamlet reading books and doing homework. Hägar breaks up Honi and Lute, and trains Hamlet in archery and other Viking venues in a single day. However, after seeing how unhappy his children have become, as well as other Vikings calling Honi and Hamlet weird, Hägar immediately takes charge and sets things right again, with Helga as his somewhat silent, but kind, supporter. The special starred the voices of Peter Cullen as Hägar, Lainie Kazan as Helga, Lydia Cornell as Honi, Josh Rodine as Hamlet, Jeff Doucette as Lucky Eddie, Don Most as Lute and Frank Welker as Snert, the Narrator, and the Viking Academy's Principal. It is available on DVD within the "Advantage Cartoon Mega Pack" set.

=== Movie project ===
Variety reported in 2003 that Abandon Pictures had acquired the film rights to the comic strip and planned a live-action theatrical feature based on the character. In late 2014, Chris Browne confirmed that a deal was made with Sony Pictures to produce a film based on the character.

=== Animated sitcom ===
On November 10, 2020 (5 years ago), it was announced that a CGI animated series co-produced by King Features and The Jim Henson Company was currently in development. The series was to be animated by Henson Digital Puppetry Studio.

=== Video games ===
In 1991, Hägar the Horrible, a scrolling platform game, was released by Kingsoft for the Amiga. It was ported to Commodore 64 for the German market.

== Book collections and reprints ==
All titles are mass-market paperbacks by Dik Browne, unless otherwise noted.

- Hägar the Horrible #1 (1974) Tempo
- Hägar the Horrible #2 (1975) Tempo
- Hägar the Horrible on the Loose (#3) (1975) Tempo
- Hägar the Horrible: The Big Bands Are Back! (trade paperback, 1975) Grosset & Dunlap
- The Wit and Wisdom of Hägar the Horrible (trade paperback, 1975) Windmill/E.P. Dutton
- Hägar the Horrible: The Brutish Are Coming (1976) Tempo
- Hägar the Horrible on the Rack (1976) Tempo
- Hägar the Horrible: Sack Time (1976) Tempo
- Hägar the Horrible: Hägar's Night Out (1977) Tempo
- Hägar the Horrible Brings 'Em Back Alive! (1977) Tempo
- Hägar Hits the Mark: The Best of the Barbarian! (1977) Tempo
- Hägar the Horrible: Born Leader (1978) Tempo
- Hägar the Horrible: Hägar and the Basilisk and Other Tales (trade paperback, 1978) Sunridge Press
- Hägar the Horrible: Ol' Blue Eyes Is Back! (1980) Tempo
- Hägar the Horrible: Animal Haus! (1981) Tempo
- Hägar the Horrible: My Feet Are Really Killing Me(1981) Tempo
- The Best of Hägar the Horrible (trade paperback, 1981) Wallaby
- The Very Best of Hägar the Horrible (trade paperback, 1982) Wallaby
- Hägar the Horrible: Midnight Munchies (1982) Tempo
- Hägar the Horrible: Vikings Are Fun (1982) Tor
- Hägar the Horrible: Sacking Paris on a Budget (1982) Tor
- Hägar the Horrible: Happy Hour (1983) Tempo
- Hägar the Horrible: Helga's Revenge (1983) Tempo
- Hägar the Horrible: Tall Tales (1983) Tor
- Hägar the Horrible: Hear No Evil (Do No Work) (1983) Tor
- Hägar the Horrible: Room for One More (1984) Tor
- Hägar the Horrible: The Simple Life (1984) Charter
- Hägar the Horrible: Excuse Me! (1984) Charter
- Hägar the Horrible: Horns of Plenty (1984) Charter
- Hägar the Horrible: Hägar at Work (1985) Tor
- Hägar the Horrible: All the World Loves a Lover (1985) Tor
- Hägar the Horrible: Face-Stuffer's Anonymous (1985) Tor
- Hägar the Horrible: Gangway!! (1985) Tor
- Hägar the Horrible: Roman Holiday (1985) Charter
- Hägar the Horrible: Have You Been Uptight Lately? (1985) Charter
- The Best of Hägar the Horrible (trade paperback, 1985) Comicana
- Hägar the Horrible's Very Nearly Complete Viking Handbook by Dik Browne, Chris Browne (trade paperback, 1985) Workman Pub. ISBN 0-89480-937-7
- Hägar the Horrible: Pillage Idiot (1986) Tor
- Hägar the Horrible: Out on a Limb (1986) Tor
- Hägar the Horrible: Strapped for Cash (1987) Charter
- Hägar the Horrible: My Feet Are Drunk (1987) Jove
- Hägar the Horrible: The Nord Star (1987) Jove
- Hägar the Horrible: Spring Cleaning (1988) Jove
- Hägar the Horrible: Hi Dear, Your Hair Looks Great! (1988) Jove
- Hägar the Horrible and the Golden Maiden (1989) Tor
- Hägar the Horrible: Sack Time (1989) Jove
- Hägar the Horrible: Handyman Special (1989) Jove
- Hägar the Horrible: Norse Code (1989) Jove
- Hägar the Horrible: Smotherly Love (1989) Jove
- Hägar the Horrible: Look Sharp! (1989) Jove
- Hägar the Horrible: Silly Sailing (1990) Jove
- Hägar the Horrible: Start the Invasion Without Me! (1990) Jove
- Hägar the Horrible: A Piece of the Pie! (1990) Jove
- Dik Browne's Hägar the Horrible: We're Doing Lunch by Chris Browne (1991) Jove
- Dik Browne's Hägar the Horrible: I Dream of Genie!? (1991) Jove
- Hägar the Horrible: I See London, I See France... (1991) Tor
- Hägar the Horrible: Again & Again (1991) Tor
- Hägar the Horrible: Fish Fly (1991) Tor
- Hägar the Horrible: Special Delivery (1992) Tor
- Hägar the Horrible: Motley Crew (1992) Tor
- Hägar the Horrible: Things That Go Bump... (1992) Tor
- Dik Browne's Hägar the Horrible: Another Fish Story by Chris Browne (1992) Jove
- Dik Browne's Hägar the Horrible: Plunder Blunder by Chris Browne (1992) Jove
- Dik Browne's Hägar the Huggable by Chris Browne (1993) Jove
- Dik Browne's Hägar the Horrible: That Dreaded... Bed Head by Chris Browne (1993) Jove
- Dik Browne's Hägar the Horrible: A Turn for the Worse by Chris Browne (1993) Jove
- Dik Browne's Hägar the Horrible: Feeling "Fortune"-ate? by Chris Browne (1994) Jove
- Dik Browne's Hägar the Horrible: Funny Bunnies by Chris Browne (1994) Jove
- Hägar the Horrible: The Epic Chronicles: Dailies 1973–1974 by Dik Browne (hardcover, November 2010) Titan Books ISBN 1-84856-233-0

== Theme park ==
Hägar the Horrible is featured in the Universal Studios Florida theme park Islands of Adventure, seen on a boat on top of Toon Extra in Toon Lagoon.
