= Czechoslovak declaration of independence =

Declaration of independence of a Czechoslovak nation from the Austro-Hungarian empire

Czechoslovak Declaration of Independence
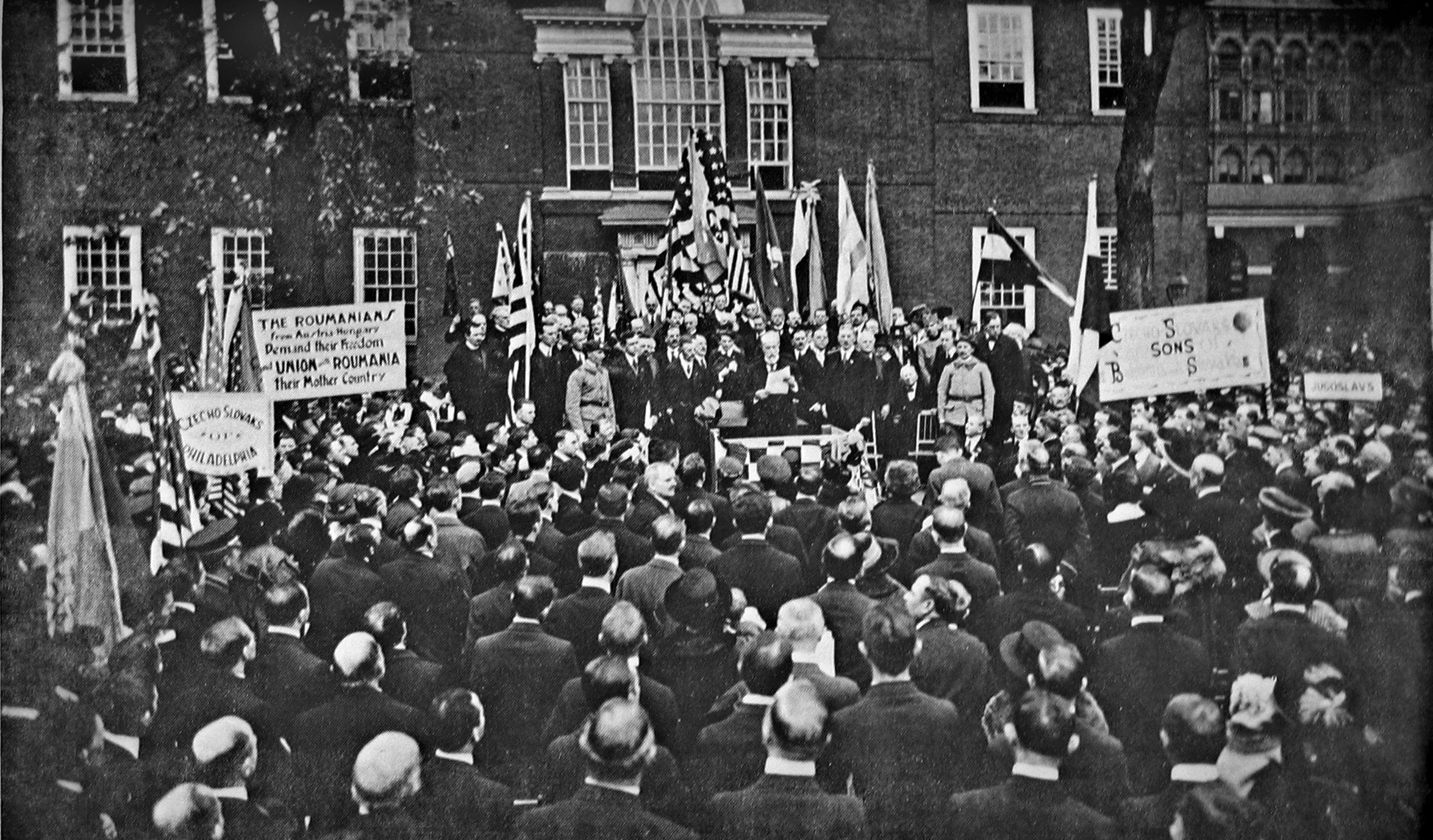
- Created: 18 October 1918
- Location: Washington, D.C.
- Author: Czechoslovak National Council
- Signatories: Tomáš Garrigue Masaryk; Milan Rastislav Štefánik; Edvard Beneš
- Purpose: To announce and explain separation of Czechoslovakia from Austria-Hungary

The Czechoslovak Declaration of Independence or the Washington Declaration (Czech: Washingtonská deklarace; Slovak: Washingtonská deklarácia; German: Washingtoner Erklärung; Hungarian: Washingtoni Nyilatkozat) was drafted in Washington, D.C., and published by Czechoslovakia's Paris-based Provisional Government on 18 October 1918. The creation of the document, officially the Declaration of Independence of the Czechoslovak Nation by its Provisional Government (Czech: Prohlášení nezávislosti československého národa zatímní vládou československou), was prompted by the imminent collapse of the Austro-Hungarian Empire, of which the Czech and Slovak lands had been part for almost 400 years, following World War I. The Declaration was first read publicly at Independence Hall in Philadelphia, Pennsylvania.

== Background ==
In the autumn of 1918, the Austro-Hungarian monarchy was collapsing. As one of his Fourteen Points, U.S. president Woodrow Wilson demanded for the empire's nationalities to have the "freest opportunity to autonomous development." On 14 October 1918, Foreign Minister Baron István Burián von Rajecz asked for an armistice based on the Fourteen Points. In an apparent attempt to demonstrate his good faith, Emperor Charles I issued a proclamation two days later that would have significantly altered the structure of the Austrian half of the monarchy. Imperial Austria was to be transformed into a federal union composed of four parts: German, Czech, South Slav and Ukrainian (Galicia would be allowed to secede). Each was to be governed by a national council that would negotiate the future of the empire with Vienna, and Trieste was to receive a special status.

However, on the same day, a Czecho-Slovak provisional government joined the Allies. The provisional government had begun drafting a declaration of independence on 13 October and completed its task on 16 October. The document was drafted by Tomáš Garrigue Masaryk and American sculptor Gutzon Borglum (Borglum hosted future soldiers of a Czecho-Slovak army on his farm in Stamford, Connecticut.) On 17 October, Masaryk presented it to the US government and Wilson. It was published in Paris 18 October 1918, with authorship attributed to Masaryk. The same day was the general strike of 14 October 1918.

On the same day, US Secretary of State Robert Lansing replied that the Allies were now committed to the causes of the Czechs, Slovaks, and South Slavs. Therefore, he said that autonomy for the nationalities, the tenth of the Fourteen Points, was no longer enough and the US could no longer deal on the basis of the Fourteen Points. The Lansing note was, in effect, the death sentence of Austria-Hungary. The national councils had already begun acting, more or less, as provisional governments of independent countries. With defeat in the war imminent after the Italian offensive in the Battle of Vittorio Veneto on 24 October, Czech politicians peacefully took over command in Prague on 28 October, which was later declared the birthday of Czechoslovakia, and followed up in other major cities over the next few days. On 30 October, the Slovaks followed with the Martin Declaration, and the Austro-Hungarian state was dissolved the next day.

== Contents ==
Much of the declaration catalogues a litany of grievances against the Habsburgs. The latter portion of the document declares a Czechoslovak Republic, with freedom of religion, speech, the press and the right of assembly and petition, separation of church from the state, universal suffrage, and equal rights for women. The declaration calls for a parliamentary political system with respect for rights of national minorities and equal rights. Social, economic, and land reform is announced, along with the cancellation of aristocratic privileges. The declaration uses the term "Czechoslovak nation" (národ československý), which deviates from the wording of the Cleveland and Pittsburgh Agreements, which defined two separate Czech and Slovak nations. The declaration is signed Masaryk (as Prime Minister and Minister of Finance), Milan Rastislav Štefánik (as Minister of National Defense) and Edvard Beneš (as Minister of Foreign Affairs and the Interior).

Of a number of European declarations of independence drafted in the post–World War I period, the Czechoslovak declaration is the one most indebted to the U.S. Declaration of Independence.
