= Chris Browne =

American cartoonist (1952–2023)

- Born: May 16, 1952; South Orange, New Jersey, U.S.
- Died: February 5, 2023 (aged 70); Sioux Falls, South Dakota, U.S.
- Occupation: Cartoonist
- Spouse: Carroll Browne
- Writing career
- Notable work: Hägar the Horrible

Christopher Kelly Browne (May 16, 1952 – February 5, 2023) was an American comic strip artist and cartoonist. He was the son of cartoonist Dik Browne and brother of cartoonist Chance Browne. From 1989 to 2023, Browne wrote and drew the comic strip Hägar the Horrible, which is distributed by King Features Syndicate.

== Life and career ==
Born in South Orange, New Jersey, on May 16, 1952, and growing up in suburban Wilton, Connecticut, Browne assisted his father on the comic strips Hi and Lois and Hägar the Horrible. He contributed to Hägar from the beginning of the comic in 1972 and co-authored Hägar the Horrible's Very Nearly Complete Viking Handbook in 1985. When Dik Browne died in 1989, Chris Browne continued the strip, both writing and drawing, while Chance Browne took over Hi and Lois.

Chris Browne also created two short-lived autobiographical comic strips: "Chris Browne's Comic Strip" (1993 – 1994) and "Raising Duncan" (2000 – 2004). Both include a Scottie dog (Scottish Terrier) as a common feature.

Browne lived in Sioux Falls, South Dakota, where he died on February 5, 2023, at the age of 70.

== Comic and artistic work ==
Hägar the Horrible is translated into 13 languages and appears in 45 countries.
