= Dik Browne =

American cartoonist (1917–1989)

- Born: Richard Arthur Allan Browne; August 11, 1917; New York City, New York, U.S.
- Died: June 4, 1989 (aged 71); Sarasota, Florida, U.S.
- Education: Cooper Union (attended)
- Occupation: Cartoonist
- Notable work: Hägar the Horrible
- Children: 3, including Chance and Chris

Richard Arthur Allan Browne (August 11, 1917 – June 4, 1989) was an American cartoonist, best known for writing and drawing Hägar the Horrible and Hi and Lois.

== Early life and education ==
Dik Browne was born on August 11, 1917, in Manhattan. He attended Cooper Union for a year, then started work at the New York Journal-American as a copy boy. He later worked in the art department, drawing maps and charts.

== Career ==
In 1936, photographers and artists were banned from the Lucky Luciano compulsory prostitution trial. Browne slipped in undetected, and his courtroom sketches gave the New York Journal-American a news exclusive on the story.

During World War II, in 1942, Browne joined the United States Army, and was assigned to draw maps and charts for an Army engineering unit, eventually rising to staff sergeant. In his spare time, he created the comic "Ginny Jeep", a comic strip about the Women's Army Corps, appearing in Army and Air Force newspapers.

In the late 1940s, he worked as an illustrator for Newsweek as well as for Johnstone and Cushing, an advertising company, where, in 1944, he created the Carmen-Miranda-inspired Miss Chiquita trademark/logo, for Chiquita, and later, the Birds Eye bird, a Campbell's Soup kids redesign, and a Mounds candy bar ad.

From 1950 to 1960, he drew The Tracy Twins, a comic strip, for Boys' Life. His work for this strip, and for the Mounds candy bar ad, brought him to the attention of King Features Syndicate.

In 1954, cartoonist Mort Walker, seeing the Mounds candy bar ad, enlisted Browne to co-create the comic strip Hi and Lois, a spin-off of Walker's popular Beetle Bailey strip, featuring Beetle's sister, brother-in-law and their family. Walker wrote the strip, which Browne illustrated until his death. The series was later drawn by his son Chance, deceased in 2024, and written by Walker's sons. In 1973, Browne created Hägar the Horrible about an ill-mannered red-bearded viking. The comic was then produced by his son Chris until 2023. Both strips have been successful, appearing in hundreds of newspapers for decades.

== Recognition ==
He got the National Cartoonists Society's Best Humor Strip plaque in 1959, 1960, and 1972, and its Reuben Award as Outstanding Cartoonist of the Year in 1962, for Hi and Lois. He was National Cartoonists Society president in 1963. The National Cartoonists Society gave Browne a second Reuben Award for Hägar the Horrible in 1973, and three more Best-Humor Strip awards in 1977, 1984, and 1986. In 1973, the National Cartoonists Society gave him the Elzie Segar Award.

== Personal life ==
Browne and his wife, Joan, raised two sons and one daughter: cartoonist Chance Browne, born in 1948; cartoonist Chris Browne, born in 1952; and Tsuiwen “Sally” Boeras-Browne. He died of cancer on June 4, 1989, at the age of 71, in Sarasota, Florida.

== Sources ==
- Strickler, Dave. Syndicated Comic Strips and Artists, 1924-1995: The Complete Index. Cambria, California: Comics Access, 1995. ISBN 0-9700077-0-1
- Social Security Death Index
