= Grawlix =

Technique used to imply profanity

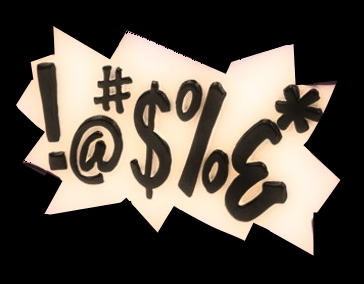
Grawlix in a speech balloon

Grawlix (/ˈɡrɔːlɪks/) or obscenicon is the use of typographical symbols to replace profanity, typically using "unpronounceable" characters. Mainly used in cartoons and comics, it has been described as the graphical equivalent of a bleep censor. The first known grawlix appeared in the November 1, 1901 story of Gene Carr's comic strip Lady Bountiful.

== Description ==
Grawlix is the use of typographical symbols to replace profanity. Mainly used in cartoons and comics, it has been described as the graphical equivalent of a bleep censor.

Grawlixes typically use "unpronounceable" characters that might be found on a typewriter or computer keyboard, including at signs (@), dollar signs ($), number signs (#), ampersands (&), percent signs (%), and asterisks (*). They may also feature other unusual shapes such as spirals. These characters may resemble the letters they replace, such as "$" standing in for "S".

== History ==
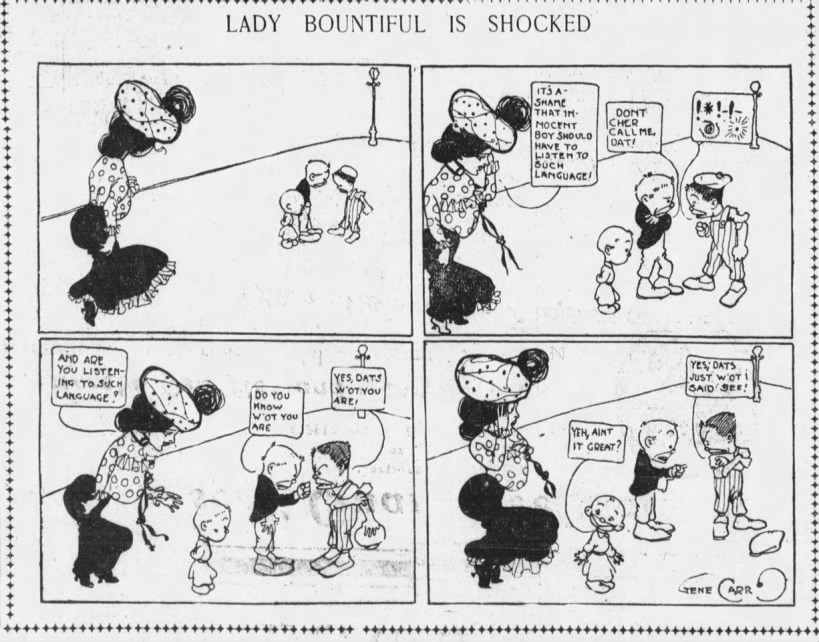
First documented use of grawlix, a 4-panel newspaper comic titled "Lady Bountiful is Shocked" published in the San Francisco Examiner on November 1, 1901

The first known grawlix appeared in November 1, 1901 story of Gene Carr's comic strip Lady Bountiful, with the title "Lady Bountiful is Shocked": the cartoon depicts two children arguing, with one of their speech bubbles simply containing the characters "!*!-!-" followed by a spiral with a line around it and a series of lines around a dot. The character of Lady Bountiful objects to "such language".

The grawlix continued to expand its usage throughout 1902 and 1903. In December 12, 1902, The Katzenjammer Kids became the second comic to adopt them. In 1964, American cartoonist Mort Walker popularized (Note: Although Walker is often credited with having created this terminology, in 2013, comics scholar Maggie Thompson discovered that Walker was using terms invented by Charles D. Rice, in an article published in This Week and subsequently reprinted in What's Funny About That (1954). Thompson also observed that, although Walker credited these symbols to "Charlie Rice of This Week magazine" in his book Backstage at the Strips (1975), "many of us [including Thompson herself] had assumed [that this] was Mort's joke about an imaginary scholarly attribution".) the term "grawlix" in his article Let's Get Down to Grawlixes, which he expanded upon in his book The Lexicon of Comicana.

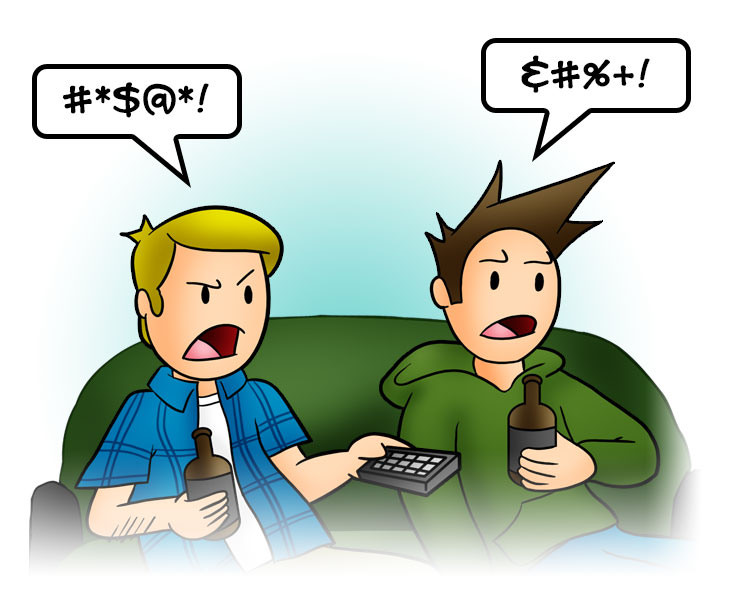
Grawlixes in a cartoon

The emoji U+1F92C 🤬 SERIOUS FACE WITH SYMBOLS COVERING MOUTH represents a face with grawlixes over the mouth. It was proposed in 2016 and accepted into Unicode 10.0 in 2017.

=== In dictionaries ===
In June 2018, the word grawlix was added to the Merriam-Webster dictionary. In November 2022, Merriam-Webster and Hasbro added the word to the seventh edition of The Official Scrabble Players Dictionary, citing familiarity among younger players. In March 2025, the word grawlix was added to the Oxford English Dictionary.

== Etymology ==
A Merriam-Webster blog post states that the word grawlix was coined by cartoonist Mort Walker (creator of the comic strip Beetle Bailey) and may have originated from the word growl, an English word for a sound a person makes when they are angry. Walker coined several words related to comic strip art though, in his book Backstage at the Strips, he attributed the coinage of "grawlix" to Charles D. Rice of This Week magazine.

== See also ==
- Bleep censor
