= Boner's Ark =

American comic strip by Mort Walker

- Author: Mort Walker
- Illustrator: Frank Johnson
- Current status/schedule: Concluded daily & Sunday strip
- Launch date: March 11, 1968; 58 years ago
- End date: May 27, 2000; 26 years ago
- Syndicate(s): King Features Syndicate
- Genre(s): Humor, religion

Boner's Ark is an American comic strip created by Mort Walker, also the creator of Beetle Bailey. Walker debuted the strip under the pseudonym "Addison" on March 11, 1968. The title is a reference to Noah's Ark of Abrahamic religions.

Designed and written by Mort Walker, Boner's Ark first appeared on March 11, 1968. The series ran until May 27, 2000, with the final strip depicting the Ark reaching dry land.

The series also ran in Norway and Sweden under the name Arken, in Finland as Masan arkki, in Denmark as Olsen's Ark and in Italy as L'arca di Gian Noè (John Noah's Ark). In the Netherlands it ran under the name De Ark van Zoo (Zoo's Ark).

== Characters and story ==
Boner's Ark depicted a menagerie of animals trapped on a boat (the "Ark") and constantly in search of land. Helmed by the bumbling Captain Boner, the Ark is small on the outside and abnormally large within. In addition to sleeping quarters for all the animals, it also features a cinema, a restaurant run by a hippopotamus, a hospital, a pub and a golf course where Captain Boner, Cubcake and the doctor spend most of their time. The complaints department is staffed by a hyena. The large initial cast was gradually pared down to a small group of regulars.

Captain Boner
Captain Boner is the leader and only human aboard the ark until Mrs. Boner is introduced to the series. He struggles to get the animals to listen to him or follow his orders. A car enthusiast, Captain Boner remodels the bridge to resemble the interior of an old automobile. When not on the bridge, the Captain is a regular at the golf course and the end of the "plank", where he goes to escape the frustrations of his office, or is forced to walk off the edge by the Hyena's frequent mutinies.
His wife, Bubbles, was introduced to the series in the 1970s, when she was rescued at sea. Shortly after she joined the strip, a story arc involved her convincing Boner to shave his moustache. He remains clean-shaven until the end of the strip.
Duke
Duke is a male penguin and a member of the society on the ark.
Rex
Rex is a dinosaur, usually depicted on the deck of the Ark or in the hospital with the Doctor.
Cubcake
Cubcake is a koala, occasionally referred to as Captain Boner's nephew. The character was originally nameless. "Cubcake" was the winning entry after the strip asked readers for suggestions regarding the koala's name.
Aarnie
Aarnie is a male aardvark. His struggles with his enormous nose are the subject of a number of strips . He is the Ark's First Mate.
The Doctor
The doctor aboard the ark is a male duck, Dr. Quack, who is often seen with Rex in his hospital. The Doctor is also a regular golfer and accompanies Captain Boner on the course.
Priscilla
Priscilla is a female pig and girlfriend of Dum-Dum the gorilla. Priscilla also unsuccessfully pursues a romantic interest with Duke.
Dum-Dum
Dum-Dum is a gorilla, and Priscilla's boyfriend. In early versions of Boner's Ark, Dum-Dum is generally naked. By the late 1970s he appears in overalls.
Lookout
Lookout is a giraffe. He is named Lookout because he is in charge of searching for land.
The Hyena
The irritable and grouchy hyena is occasionally seen staffing the complaints desk, and running a marriage counseling service for Boner and Bubbles. He stages frequent mutinies against Boner.

== Minor characters ==
Minor characters include a snake, mouse, otter, bear, turtle, elephant and a lion. A hippopotamus waits tables at the Ark's restaurant. A pelican works as the ark's handyman.
