= Mort Walker =

American comic strip cartoonist (1923–2018)

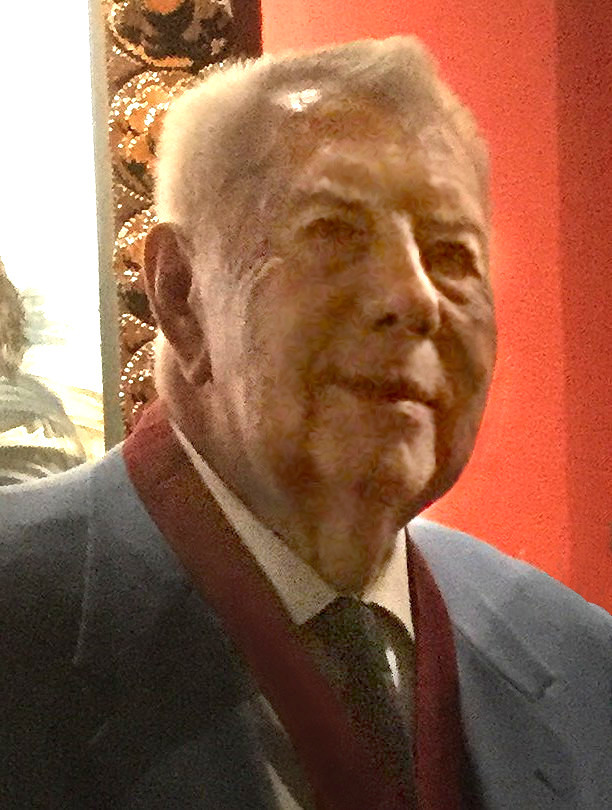
- Walker in April 2016
- Born: Addison Morton Walker; September 3, 1923 El Dorado, Kansas, U.S.
- Died: January 27, 2018 (aged 94) Stamford, Connecticut, U.S.
- Areas: Cartoonist, Writer, Artist
- Pseudonym: Addison
- Notable works: Beetle Bailey; Hi and Lois
- Awards: full list
- Spouses: Jean Suffill (m. 1949; div. 1985) Catherine Prentice (m. 1985)
- Children: 7

Signature
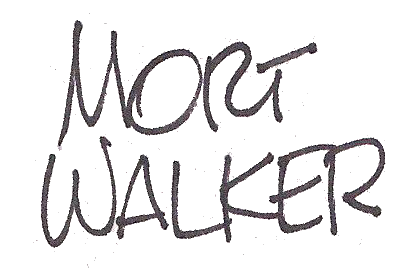
- Military career
- Branch: U.S. Army
- Service years: 1943–1947
- Rank: First lieutenant
- Conflicts: World War II

Addison Morton Walker (September 3, 1923 – January 27, 2018) was an American comic strip writer, best known for creating the newspaper comic strips Beetle Bailey in 1950 and Hi and Lois in 1954. He signed Addison to some of his strips.

== Early life ==
Walker was born in El Dorado, Kansas, as the third of four children in the family. His siblings were Peggy W. Harman (1915–2012), Robin Ellis Walker (1918–2013) and Marilou W. White (1927–2021). After a couple of years, his family moved to Amarillo, Texas, and later to Kansas City, Missouri, in late 1927, where his father, Robin Adair Walker, was an architect, while his mother, Carolyn Richards Walker (d. 1970), worked as a newspaper staff illustrator. He was of Scottish, Irish, and English descent. One of his ancestors was a doctor aboard the Mayflower.

During his elementary school years, he drew for a student newspaper. He attended Northeast High School, where he was a cheerleader, school newspaper editor, yearbook art editor, stage actor in a radio show and ran neighborhood teen center that belonged to several organizations. He had his first comic published at age 11 and sold his first cartoon at 12. At age 14, he regularly sold gag cartoons to Child's Life, Flying Aces, and Inside Detective magazines. When he was 15, he drew a comic strip, The Lime Juicers, for the weekly Kansas City Journal, and worked as a staff artist at the same time for an industrial publisher. At age 18, he was the chief editorial designer for Hallmark Brothers (later Hallmark Cards) and was instrumental in changing the company's cards from cuddly bears to gag cartoons, which were more suitable for soldiers.

Graduating from Northeast High School, he attended one year at Kansas City Junior College in 1942–43 before going to the University of Missouri. Walker's physical presence in Columbia is noted by The Shack, which was a rambling burger joint behind Jesse Hall on Conley Avenue. Images resembling the interior of the shack appeared in Beetle Bailey cartoons and is mentioned by name in the September 14, 1950 Beetle Bailey strip. Walker visited the Shack on return trips to Columbia with the last being to the original structure in 1978. The Shack was destroyed in a fire in 1988 and Walker returned in 2010 for dedication of a replica of the building in the student center with the dining area now formally called "Mort's". A life-sized bronze statue of Beetle Bailey stands in front of the alumni center which is near The Shack's original location.

== Military service ==
In 1943, Walker was drafted into the United States Army and served in Italy, where he was an intelligence and investigating officer and was also in charge of an Allied camp for 10,000 German POWs. After the war he was posted to Italy where he was in charge of an Italian guard company. He was discharged as a first lieutenant in 1947.

== Comic strips ==
Walker graduated in 1948 from the University of Missouri, where he was the editor and art director of the college's humor magazine, Showme, and was president of the local Kappa Sigma chapter. After graduation, Walker went to New York to pursue a career in cartooning. He began doing Spider, a one-panel series for The Saturday Evening Post, about a lazy, laid-back college student. When he decided he could make more money doing a multi-panel comic strip, Spider morphed into Beetle Bailey, eventually distributed by King Features Syndicate to 1,800 newspapers in more than 50 countries for a combined readership of 200 million daily.

In 1954, Walker and Dik Browne teamed to launch Hi and Lois, a spin-off of Beetle Bailey (Lois was Beetle's sister). Under the pseudonym "Addison", Walker began Boner's Ark in 1968. Other comic strips created by Walker include Gamin and Patches, Mrs. Fitz's Flats, The Evermores (with Johnny Sajem), Sam's Strip, and Sam and Silo (the last two with Jerry Dumas). In 2008 the collection was moved to the Billy Ireland Cartoon Library & Museum at Ohio State University.

In 1974, Walker opened the Museum of Cartoon Art, the first museum devoted to the art of comics. It was initially located in Greenwich, Connecticut, and Rye Brook, New York, before moving to Boca Raton, Florida, in 1992.

During his life he drew special drawings for individuals, in particular for those who were ill.

From previous marriages, Walker and his wife, Catherine, had ten children between them. Walker's sons Brian and Greg Walker produce the Hi and Lois strip with Chance Browne.

== Books ==
In addition to books about comics and children's books, Walker collected his strips into 92 "Beetle Bailey" paperbacks and 35 "Hi and Lois" paperbacks, plus writing his autobiography, Mort Walker's Scrapbook: Celebrating a Life of Love and Laughter.

In his book The Lexicon of Comicana (1980), written as a satirical look at the devices cartoonists use, Walker popularized (Note: Although Walker is often credited with having created this terminology, in 2013, comics scholar Maggie Thompson discovered that Walker was using terms invented by Charles D. Rice, in an article published in This Week and subsequently reprinted in What's Funny About That (1954). Thompson also observed that, although Walker credited these symbols to "Charlie Rice of This Week magazine" in his book Backstage at the Strips (1975), "many of us [including Thompson herself] had assumed [that this] was Mort's joke about an imaginary scholarly attribution".) a vocabulary called Symbolia, including the term "squeans" to describe the starbusts and little circles that appear around a cartoon's head to indicate intoxication, and grawlixes to indicate the typographical symbols that stand for profanities, which appear in dialogue balloons in the place of actual dialogue.

In 2006, he launched a 24-page magazine, The Best of Times, distributed free throughout Connecticut and available online. It features artwork, puzzles, editorial cartoons, ads, and a selection of articles, comics and columns syndicated by King Features. His son, Neal Walker, was the editor and publisher. Between 2006 and 2010, they published 27 issues.

== Exhibitions ==
In September 2000, the University of Missouri staged a Beetle Bailey 50th-anniversary exhibition in the grand concourse of the Elmer Ellis Library, displaying original daily and Sunday strips, published reprints and poster-size lithographs of selected strips.

== Awards ==
In 1974, Walker founded the National Cartoon Museum, and in 1989 was inducted into its Museum of Cartoon Art Hall of Fame. He received the Reuben Award of 1953 for Beetle Bailey, the National Cartoonists Society's Humor Strip Award for 1966 and 1969, the Gold T-Square Award in 1999, the Elzie Segar Award for 1977 and 1999, and numerous other awards. In 1978, Walker received the American Legion's Fourth Estate Award, and in 2000, he was given the Decoration for Distinguished Civilian Service by the United States Army. He was awarded the Inkpot Award in 1979.

Walker received the Sparky Award for lifetime achievement from the Cartoon Art Museum at the 2010 New York Comic Con. On September 29, 2017, Walker was honored at Yankee Stadium, during the 7th-inning stretch, for his service in World War II.

== Personal life ==
Walker was married in 1949 to his first wife, Jean Suffill, whom he had met during his time at the University of Missouri. They had seven children: Greg, Brian, Polly, Morgan, Marjorie, Neal, and Roger. The marriage later ended in a divorce in 1985. His second wife was Catherine Prentice, whom he married on August 24, 1985. Walker had three stepchildren via Cathy and her previous marriage to cartoonist John Prentice.

Walker died from complications of pneumonia on January 27, 2018, at his home in Stamford, Connecticut. He was 94 years old. He was interred at Willowbrook Cemetery in Westport, Connecticut.

== General references ==
- Reynolds, Moria Davison (2003). Comic Strip Artists in American Newspapers, 1945–1980 (Illustrated ed.). McFarland. ISBN 978-0-786-48150-7.
- Walker, Mort (2000). Mort Walker's Private Scrapbook: Celebrating a Life of Love and Laughter (Illustrated ed.). Andrews McMeel Publishing. ISBN 978-0-740-71126-8.
- Whiton, Jason, ed. (2005). Mort Walker: Conversations (Illustrated ed.). University Press of Mississippi. ISBN 978-1-578-06700-8.
- Whiton, Jason (2018). Talking Mort Walker: A Life in Comics (Illustrated ed.). Amazon. ISBN 978-1718029248.
