= Chance Browne =

American cartoonist (1948–2024)

Robert David "Chance" Browne (June 17, 1948 – March 1, 2024) was an American comic strip artist and cartoonist, painter, and musician. He was born in New York City.

After his father Dik Browne died in 1989, Browne took over drawing the family comic strip Hi and Lois. The comic is syndicated throughout the United States and stars the characters Hi, Lois, Dot, Ditto, Chip, and Trixie. Hi and Lois is syndicated by King Features, as is the other Browne family comic strip Hägar the Horrible (which was done by Chance's brother Chris).

Chance Browne also played guitar and sang in his band The Twinkies, a group that was formed in 1973. He attended both Park College in Missouri and the School of Visual Arts in New York City. While he made a living as a cartoonist, he had a true passion for painting, which he did in his spare time. Browne lived in Connecticut with his wife Debra, an editor for Hägar the Horrible. They had three daughters. Browne died at his home in Wilton, Connecticut on March 1, 2024, at the age of 75.

== Sources ==
- Strickler, Dave. Syndicated Comic Strips and Artists, 1924–1995: The Complete Index. Cambria, CA: Comics Access, 1995. ISBN 0-9700077-0-1
