= Popeye Meets the Man Who Hated Laughter =

- Genre: Television film
- Based on: Popeye by E.C. Segar, among others.
- Story by: Lou Silverton
- Directed by: Hal Seeger; Jack Zander
- Voices of: Bob McFadden; Jack Mercer; Corinne Orr
- Theme music composer: Elliot Chiprut
- Country of origin: United States
- Original language: English

Production
- Producer: Al Brodax
- Running time: 60 minutes
- Production companies: King Features Syndicate; Hal Seeger Productions; Zander's Animation Parlour

Original release
- Network: ABC
- Release: October 7, 1972

Related
- Nanny and the Professor; Willie Mays and the Say-Hey Kid

Popeye Meets the Man Who Hated Laughter, also known as The Man Who Hated Laughter, is a 1972 American animated one-hour television special that was part of The ABC Saturday Superstar Movie. This film united characters from almost every newspaper comic strip then owned by King Features Syndicate in one story. The show aired on October 7, 1972, and was repeated in February 1974.

This film marked the first time that Steve Canyon, The Phantom, Tim Tyler and Flash Gordon appeared in animation. In the 1980s, the cartoon series Defenders of the Earth would feature Flash Gordon, Mandrake the Magician, and The Phantom as freedom fighters united against a common enemy, Ming the Merciless.

== Plot ==
Professor Morbid Grimsby is an evil genius who has won the prestigious "Meanie" award six years in a row; to guarantee a seventh, he plots to eliminate all laughter by getting rid of the Sunday funnies, with the aid of his henchman Brutus.

Popeye is given a job as captain of the Professor's yacht, the SS Hilarious, and all the characters from the humorous comic strips are informed that they have won a free ocean voyage upon this boat. Once out at sea, the boat is pulled to a remote island by the Professor's tractor beam, and in the chaos Popeye's stash of spinach is lost at sea; thus, he and all the passengers are prisoners of the Professor.

Being a huge fan of the Sunday funnies, the President of the United States takes action by calling together the heroes of the adventure comics to rescue the prisoners. The rescue attempts go wrong, and the adventure characters also end up as prisoners.

The prisoners eventually decide that the only way to free themselves is to make the Professor laugh, to convince him that the world needs laughter. They put on a talent show which fails to have an effect, but then the younger characters get him to laugh by showing him his own reflection in a mirror while he's trying to scare them; the Professor has a change of heart, and decides to let everyone go.

At that moment, however, a volcano on the island begins to erupt; the Professor uses his submarine to get the comic characters off the island, but it gets stuck in a cavern. Popeye finds his spinach in the water, eats it, and frees the submarine. The story ends with the comic characters and the Professor being treated to a party on the White House lawn; they're told that the President will join them shortly. Unbeknownst to the guests, he is actually at that moment enjoying the comics page of his newspaper.

== Voice cast (uncredited) ==
- Bob McFadden - Brutus, Dagwood Bumstead, Mr. Beasley, Beetle Bailey, Sergeant Snorkel, Otto, Lieutenant Jackson Flap, Snuffy Smith, Jiggs, Hi Flagston, Inspector, Flash Gordon, Phantom/Kit Walker, Mandrake the Magician, Lothar, Tim Tyler, Steve Canyon, Professor Morbid Grimsby, President of the United States, News Reporter
- Jack Mercer - Popeye, J. Wellington Wimpy
- Corinne Orr - Olive Oyl, Swee'Pea, Blondie Bumstead, Loweezy, Maggie, Lois Flagston, Dot Flagston, Mama, Hans, Fritz, Little Iodine, Quincy, Tiger, Dale Arden

== Comic strips ==
Characters from the following comic strips appear in the film:

- Barney Google and Snuffy Smith
- Blondie
- Beetle Bailey
- Bringing Up Father
- Flash Gordon
- Henry
- Hi and Lois
- The Katzenjammer Kids
- Little Iodine
- The Little King
- Mandrake the Magician
- The Phantom
- Popeye
- Prince Valiant (cameo)
- Quincy
- Steve Canyon
- Tiger
- Tim Tyler's Luck

== Production ==
The film was co-directed and co-produced by Hal Seeger at Hal Seeger Productions and Jack Zander at Zander's Animation Parlour. Jack Mercer provided the voices of Popeye and J. Wellington Wimpy, while Bob McFadden and Corinne Orr voiced all the other characters.
