= Slovak lands =

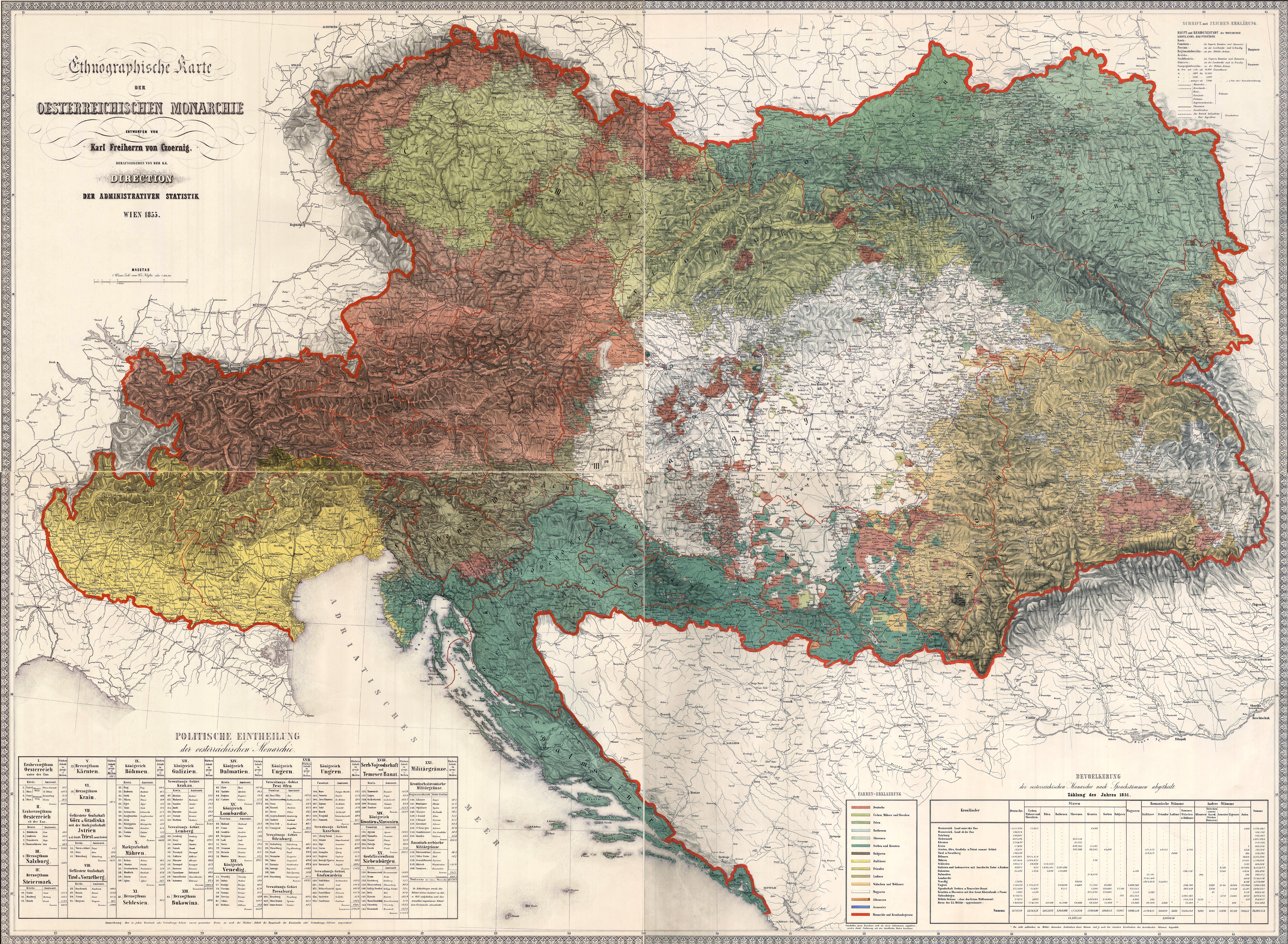
Slovak lands in the Austrian Empire 1855

Slovak lands or Slovakian lands (Slovak: Slovenská zem or shortly Slovensko; Hungarian: Tótország; Polish: Ziemia Słowacka or shortly Słowaczyzna) is the historical denomination for the whole of the Slovak-inhabited territories in Central Europe.

However, It more or less corresponds to modern Slovakia and the adjacent territories in which autochthonous Slovak minorities live.

== Terminology ==
The term Slovak lands describes Slovak ethnic territory claimed from the 5th century when Slavs inhabited these lands. The Slovaks called their country 'Slovensko' (Slovakia) – the term appears in written documents from as early as the fifteenth century.

== History ==
The first known Slavic entities on the territory of Slovakia were the Samo's Empire in the 7th century, the Principality of Nitra founded sometime in the 8th century and Great Moravia in the 9th and early 10th centuries. The Slovak lands for 1000 years were an important part of the Kingdom of Hungary. During the 17th century many Germans settled into these areas.

== Autonomy of Slovak lands ==
Slovak lands acquired autonomous status within Hungarian Democratic Republic at March 11, 1919 by LEX No. XXX. after dissolution of the Kingdom of Hungary. Autonomy was signed by Hungarian president Mihály Károlyi and prime minister Dénes Berinkey.
