= The Lexicon of Comicana =

Book by Mort Walker

- Front cover art
- Author: Mort Walker
- Language: English
- Subject: Reference
- Publisher: iUniverse (2000)
- Publication date: 1980, 2000
- Publication place: United States
- Media type: Print
- Pages: 108
- ISBN: 0-595-08902-X

The Lexicon of Comicana is a 1980 book by the American cartoonist Mort Walker. It was intended as a tongue-in-cheek look at the devices used by comics cartoonists. In it, Walker extends Charles D. Rice's earlier work on comic symbol names and comes up with an international set of symbols called symbolia after researching cartoons around the world (described by the term comicana). In 1964, Walker had written an article called "Let's Get Down to Grawlixes", a satirical piece for the National Cartoonists Society. He used terms such as grawlixes for his own amusement, but they soon began to catch on and acquired an unexpected validity. The Lexicon was written in response to this.

The names invented for these symbols sometimes appear in dictionaries, and serve as convenient terminology occasionally used by cartoonists and critics. A 2001 gallery showing of comic- and street-influenced art in San Francisco, for example, was called "Plewds! Squeans! and Spurls!"

A new edition was published in 2025.

== Examples ==
- Agitrons: wiggly lines around a shaking object or character.
- Blurgits: a kind of stroboscopic technique to show movement within a single panel.
- Swalloops: curved lines preceding or trailing after a character's moving limbs.
- Briffits (💨): clouds of dust that hang in the wake of a swiftly departing character or object.
- Crottles: Crosses in place of someone's eyes indicating that they are passed out or dead.
- Dites, hites and vites: straight lines drawn across flat, clear and reflective surfaces, such as windows and mirrors. The first letter indicates direction: diagonal, horizontal and vertical respectively. Hites may also be used trailing after something moving with great speed.
- Emanata: lines drawn around the head to indicate shock or surprise
- Grawlixes (#, $, *, @): typographical symbols standing in for profanities, appearing in dialogue balloons in place of actual dialogue.
- Indotherm (♨): wavy, rising lines used to represent steam or heat.
- Lucaflect: a shiny spot on a surface of something, depicted as a four-paned window shape.
- Plewds (💦): flying sweat droplets that appear around a character's head when working hard, stressed, etc.
- Quimps (🪐): A special example of the grawlix, a symbol resembling the planet Saturn.
- Solrads: radiating lines drawn from something luminous like a lightbulb or the sun.
- Squeans (💫): little starbursts or circles that signify intoxication, dizziness, or sickness.

Additional symbolia terms include whiteope, sphericasia, that-a-tron, spurls, oculama, maledicta balloons, farkles, doozex, staggeratron, boozex, digitrons, nittles, waftaroms, and jarns.

== History of terminology ==
A number of these symbol names, including squean, spurl, crottle, plewd, briffit, and femblor, were originally invented and described by Charles D. Rice starting in the 1940s. Comics scholar Maggie Thompson noted that these names were further published by Rice in What's Funny About That (1954), and also observed that, although Walker did cite his sources ("Charlie Rice of This Week magazine") in his 1975 book Backstage at the Strips, "many [including Thompson herself] (...) assumed [that this] was [Walker's] joke about an imaginary scholarly attribution."

== See also ==
- Glossary of comics terminology
- Sniglet

== Bibliography ==
- Steve Edgell, Tim Pilcher, Brad Brooks, The Complete Cartooning Course: Principles, Practices, Techniques (London: Barron's, 2001), pp. 50–51, ISBN 978-0764113185
