= Beetle Bailey =

American comic strip

- Author: Mort Walker (1950–2018); Neal, Brian & Greg Walker (1982–present)
- Illustrator: Mort Walker (1950–2018)
- Current status/schedule: Running daily and Sunday
- Launch date: September 4, 1950; 76 years ago
- Syndicate: King Features Syndicate
- Genre(s): Humor, Gag-a-day

A page from the comic book version of Beetle Bailey

Beetle Bailey is an American comic strip created by cartoonist Mort Walker, published since September 4, 1950. It is set on a fictional United States Army post. In the years just before Walker's death in 2018 (at age 94), it was among the oldest comic strips still being produced by its original creator. Over the years, Mort Walker had been assisted by (among others) Jerry Dumas, Bob Gustafson, Frank Johnson and Walker's sons, Neal, Brian and Greg Walker, who are continuing the strip after his death.

== Overview ==
Beetle was originally a college student at Rockview University, as of September 4, 1950. Although he was as lazy in college as he would be in the service, he did have a broken down jalopy and was the star of the track team (apparently on a scholarship). He had four friends: Bitter Bill; Diamond Jim; Freshman and Sweatsock. He also smoked a pipe. The characters in that early strip were modeled after Walker's Kappa Sigma fraternity brothers at the University of Missouri. On March 13, 1951, during the strip's first year, Beetle quit school and enlisted in the U.S. Army, where he has remained ever since. His reason for enlisting was because he was running away after being nearly trapped by both his angry jealous first girlfriend "Buzz" and a second girl who was chasing him.

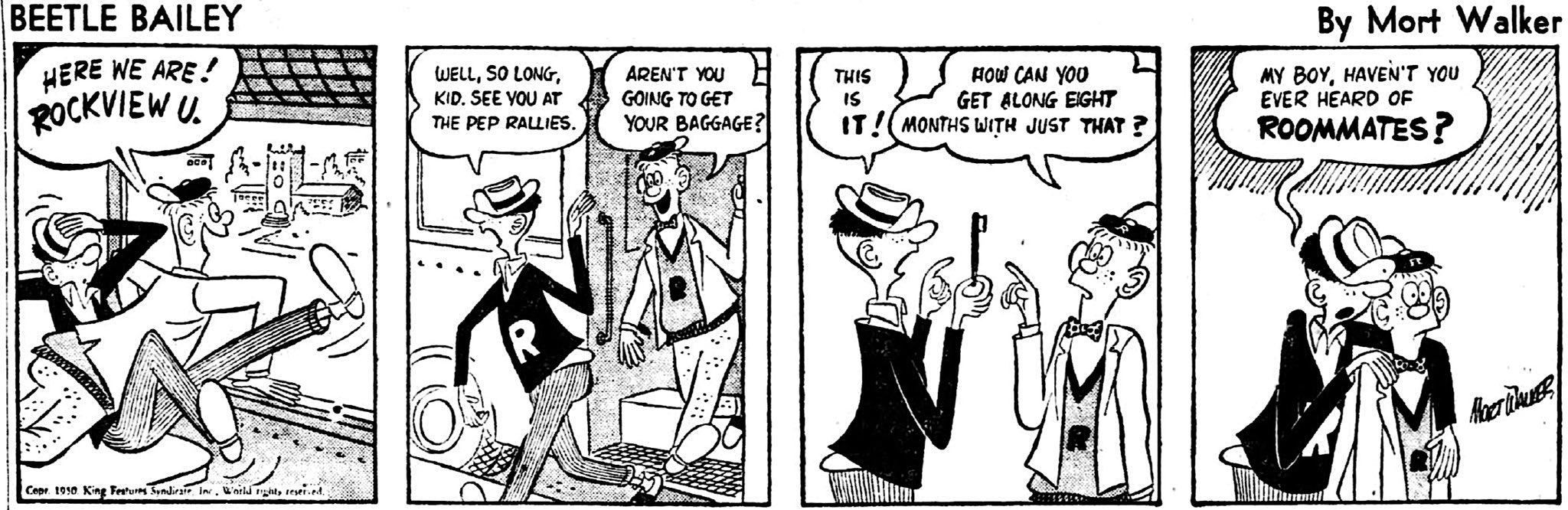
The very first Beetle Bailey comic strip circa September 4th, 1950. Copyright not renewed in 1977.

Most of the humor in Beetle Bailey revolves around the inept characters stationed at Camp Swampy (inspired by Camp Crowder, where Walker had once been stationed while in the Army), which is located near the town of Hurleyburg at "Parris Island, S.C." (a real-life Marine Corps base). Private Bailey is a lazy sort who usually naps and avoids work, and thus is often the subject of verbal and physical chastising from his senior NCO, Sergeant Snorkel. The characters never seem to see combat themselves, with the exception of mock battles and combat drills.

Beetle is always seen with a hat or helmet which covers his forehead and eyes. Even on leave, his "civvies" include a pork pie hat worn in the same style. He can be seen without it only once—in the original strip, when he was still a college student. The strip was pulled and never ran in any newspaper. It has been printed only in various books on the strip's history. In his 1975 memoir Backstage at the Strips, Walker addressed the question of Beetle's eyes, saying:

I constantly get inquiries as to the color of Beetle's eyes. As if I knew. Black as ink, I suppose, if he has any. Maybe there's nothing under the hat. Why should there be? There is nothing until I draw it, and I've never drawn his eyes. Why, then, should he have any?

One running gag has Sergeant Snorkel hanging helplessly from a small tree branch after having fallen off a cliff, with the first instance running on August 16, 1956. While he is never shown falling off, or even walking close to the edge of a cliff, he always seems to hold on to that same branch, yelling for help.

Beetle Bailey (November 21, 2007): In this running gag, Sergeant Snorkel hangs from a small tree growing out of a cliff, while Private Bailey is seen trying to help him—and himself

== Publication history ==
During the first two years of Beetle Bailey's run (1950–1952), Walker did all work on the strip himself, including writing, penciling, inking and lettering; however, in 1952 he hired cartoonist Fred Rhoads as his first assistant. After that, numerous people assisted Walker on the strip through the years.

As of 2016, the strip was being syndicated (by King Features) in 1,800 papers in the United States and the rest of the world.

In Sweden, the strip received a dedicated magazine in 1970, with a Norwegian version being added the following year, which is published to this day as of 2020. Denmark also has dedicated (albeit not exclusive) magazine, named "Basserne", first published in 1973.

== Characters and story ==
=== Main characters ===
- Private Carl James "Beetle" Bailey: the main character and the strip's namesake, a feckless, shirking, perpetual goof-off and straggler known for his chronic laziness and generally insubordinate attitude. Slack, hapless, lanky and freckled, Beetle's eyes are always concealed, whether by headgear or, in the rare instance of not wearing any (e.g., in the shower), by his hair. He is an expert in camouflage as he is often hiding from Sarge. His nickname was given to him by his aunt who thought his freckles made him look like a ladybug beetle. In early strips, it was revealed that he is the brother of Lois Flagston (née Bailey) of the Hi and Lois comic strip, which Mort Walker wrote, and Dik Browne drew. Beetle's and Lois's grandmother came from Dublin, Ireland. Beetle has a brother Chigger.
- Sergeant 1st Class Orville P. Snorkel: Beetle's platoon sergeant and nemesis, introduced in 1951. Sarge is known to frequently beat up Beetle for any excuse he can think of, leaving Beetle a shapeless pulp. Obese, snaggle-toothed and volatile, Sarge can be alternately short-tempered and sentimental. They share an uneasy alliance that sometimes borders on genuine (albeit unequal) friendship. Despite his grouchiness and bossiness, Sarge does have a soft side, which he usually keeps concealed. He is from Pork Corners, Kansas. He is also known to be foul-mouthed, even compared to the rest of the cast.
- Otto: Sgt. Snorkel's anthropomorphic, look-alike bulldog whom Sarge dresses up the same as himself, in an army uniform. Otto is fiercely protective of Sarge and seems to have a particular antipathy toward Beetle. His first appearance was July 17, 1956; originally he was a regular dog who walked on all fours, but Mort Walker finally decided to make him more human-like, believing he would be "funnier that way."
- Brigadier General Amos T. Halftrack: the inept, frustrated, alcoholic commander of Camp Swampy, introduced in 1951. As of April 26, 1980 he was married to his wife Martha for 30 years. He also has a "General Halfrack Fan Club" (1 member) An actual "Half-track" is a military vehicle. In a July 1997 story arc, Halftrack attended mandatory sensitivity training and apologized for his sexist behavior.
- Miss Buxley: Halftrack's blonde, buxom civilian secretary—and occasional soldier's date (as well as a constant distraction for Halftrack). Miss Buxley has an apparent interest in Beetle and later becomes his girlfriend, but is constantly pursued by Killer. Although she officially became part of the comic in the November 17, 1971, strip, she made an earlier cameo in 1964 as that of woman who refused to date Killer because she dated officers only and wouldn't believe he was an officer himself because of his "dishpan hands."
- Lieutenant Sonny Fuzz: very young (with noticeably pointy eyebrows and very little facial hair), overly earnest, anal-retentive, "by the book" and highly misophonic, especially where squeaky furniture is concerned. The apple-polishing Fuzz is always trying to impress uninterested superiors (especially Halftrack), and "rub it in the noses" of his subordinates. He was introduced March 7, 1956 and even then he was so naive that Pvt Cosmo actually won Fuzz's uniform in a dice game. Mort Walker said he modeled the character and personality of Lt. Fuzz on himself, having taken himself too seriously after completing Officer Training.
- Lieutenant Jackson Flap: the strip's first black character, often touchy and suspicious but effortlessly cool, introduced in 1970. Originally wore an afro hairstyle, but later shaved it off as later regulations disallowed many hairdos. Has often been seen with a beard, and is in most ways the total opposite to Lt. Fuzz, even though they share the same rank. Walker created Flap due to critique of the all-White crew of the comic strip, and was immediately censored by US Army newspaper Stars and Stripes until criticism made the publication revert the decision and publish strips with Flap in them along with the rest.
- Cookie (Cornelius) Jowls: the mess sergeant, who smokes cigarettes while preparing the mess hall's questionable menu. He practices no sanitary food preparation measures aside from wearing a chef hat, and is almost always seen wearing a tank top. Walker once described him as "the sum of all Army cooks I've met in my life."
- Private "Killer" Diller: the notorious ladies' man and Beetle's frequent crony—introduced in 1951.
- Private Zero: the buck-toothed, naïve farm boy who takes commands and comments literally and misunderstands practically everything.
- Private Plato: the Camp's resident intellectual; portly, bespectacled, given to scrawling long-winded, analytical, often philosophical graffiti. Named after Plato but based on Walker's pal, fellow cartoonist Dik Browne. Plato is the only character other than Beetle to evolve from the early "college" months of the strip.

=== Supporting characters ===
- Private Blips: Gen. Halftrack's competent, jaded, not-at-all-buxom secretary. She resents Halftrack's constant ogling of Miss Buxley, and though envious of the latter's appearance maintains a polite working relationship with her.
- Chaplain Staneglass: According to Mort Walker's Private Scrapbook, Walker based the chaplain on Irish actor Barry Fitzgerald's priest character from Going My Way (1944). He often tries to get Sarge to not beat up Beetle or the men but his efforts either backfire or are futile.
- Martha (Knips) Halftrack: the General's formidable, domineering wife. She is 70 years old. Her brother Sgt Knips is the senior NCO at Camp Swampy.
- Private Rocky: His style combines a pompadour, a mullet, and sideburns, along with his ever-present disaffected scowl. Rocky is Camp Swampy's disgruntled social dissident and former biker gang member.
- Private Cosmo: Camp Swampy's sunglass-wearing, resident "shady entrepreneur" and huckster. Loosely based on William Holden's Sefton character from Stalag 17.
- Captain Sam Scabbard: hard-nosed, flat-top wearing officer, commander of A Company and usually depicted as competent. Mort Walker has said that there needed to be at least one normal person in the comic.
- Major Greenbrass: staff officer and golf partner of Gen. Halftrack. He is most often simply a sounding-board for the general, reacting to his superior's shenanigans instead of causing his own. In March 2023 he was redesigned with dark skin, making him Black.
- Private Julius Plewer: fastidious fussbudget, who eventually became Halftrack's chauffeur.
- Corporal Yo: the strip's only Asian character, introduced in 1990, who tries to help Sarge bring efficiency to Company A. After 30 years in the strip he was redesigned with an olive complexion and less slanted eyes.
- Dr. Bonkus: Camp Swampy's staff psychiatrist, a little "crazy."
- Sergeant 1st Class Louise Lugg: a tough female soldier who hopes to be Sarge's girlfriend, introduced in 1986.
- Bella: Sgt. Louise Lugg's female pet cat.
- Specialist Chip Gizmo: Camp Swampy's resident computer geek, was named by a write-in contest in 2002, won by Earl Hemminger, from Springfield, Virginia. The contest, sponsored by Dell Computer Corp., received more than 84,000 entries. It raised more than $100,000 for the Fisher House Foundation, a non-profit organization that provides housing for families of patients at military and veterans hospitals.

The contest to name the new character Gizmo first appeared in this May 6, 2002, strip when Gen. Halftrack walks into Mort Walker's studio demanding a new character to help him with computer related stuff. In the July 4, 2002, strip, the entry sent in by Earl Hemminger of Springfield, Virginia, was announced as the winner from 84,725 entries.

=== Retired characters ===
- Bunny Piper—Was Beetle's seldom-seen girlfriend (from 1959), before he started dating Miss Buxley.
- Buzz—Was Beetle's girlfriend before 1959.
- Canteen (early 1950s)—always eating.
- Snake Eyes (early 1950s)—the barracks gambler, replaced by Cosmo, Rocky and others.
- Big Blush (early 1950s)—tall, innocent, and a great attraction to the girls; many of his characteristics incorporated into both Sarge and Zero.
- Fireball (early 1950s)—neophyte who always seems to be in the way, forerunner of both Zero and Lt. Fuzz.
- Bammy (early 1950s)—the southern patriot from Alabama who is still fighting the Civil War.
- Dawg (early 1950s)—the guy in every barracks who creates his own pollution.
- Ozone (late 1950s)—Zero's bigger, even more naïve friend.
- Moocher (early 1960s)—stingy and always borrowing things.
- Pop (1960s)—married private: gets yelled at by Sarge all day and goes home at night for more abuse from his wife.
- Sergeant ("Glotis") Webbing—Snorkel outsnore the loudest snoring by Sgt "Glotis" on one occasion Sgt Snorkel was shocked that Beetle was "cheating" when Beetle allowed himself to be beaten up by Sgt Webbing instead of Sgt Snorkel
- Rolf (early 1980s)—Originally introduced in response to complaints about the constant ogling of Miss Buxley by the male characters. First appearance was in the September 9, 1982 strip, disappeared completely by the mid-1980s.

The early strip was set at Rockview University. When Beetle joined the army, all of the other characters were dropped (although both incarnations of the strip include a bespectacled intellectual named Plato). Four characters from the original cast (Bitter Bill, Diamond Jim, Freshman, and Sweatsock) made at least one appearance, in the January 5, 1963 strip.

== Censorship ==
A censored comic strip of Beetle Bailey, from January 12, 2006. Uncensored strip at top, censored strip in the middle. The Norwegian translation of the comic strip is shown at the bottom, to show that it was not censored in Norway.

Self-censored comic strip at sketch stage

For the most part, Walker's relationship with the real-life US Army has been cordial. But not always. During the early 1950s, the strip was dropped from the Tokyo edition of Stars and Stripes because it allegedly encouraged disrespect for officers. The civilian press made a huge joke of that, and the ensuing publicity gave the young strip its first big boost in circulation.

— Don Markstein

In 1962, the comic strip was censored because it showed a belly button, and in 2006, the description of Rocky's criminal past was replaced with a non-criminal past.

=== Self-censoring ===
Sometimes Mort Walker created strips with raunchy subject matter for his own amusement. This was done at the sketch stage, and those strips were never meant to be published in the U.S. They "end[ed] up in a black box in the bottom drawer", according to Walker. These sketches were sometimes published in Scandinavia, however, with a translation underneath. In Norway, they appeared in the Norwegian Beetle Bailey comic book, Billy, with the cover of the comic marked to show it contained censored strips. To offset any possible negative reaction, the publisher experimented with "scrambling" the strips in the mid-1990s. To see them, the reader had to view them through a "de-scrambling" plastic card. This was discontinued soon afterward, and the strips later were printed without scrambling. In Sweden, some of these strips were collected in the Alfapocket series.

== Animation ==
A television series based on the strip, consisting of 50 six-minute animated cartoon shorts produced by King Features Syndicate, was animated by Paramount Cartoon Studios in the U.S. and Artransa Film Studios in Sydney, Australia. The series was first broadcast in 1963 as part of The King Features Trilogy. 50 episodes were produced.

The opening credits included the sound of a bugle reveille, followed by a theme song specifically composed for the cartoon. In the closing credits Geoff Pike was listed as Director.

Beetle was voiced by comic actor and director Howard Morris with Allan Melvin as the voice of Sarge. Other King Features properties, such as Snuffy Smith and Krazy Kat, also appeared in the syndicated series, under the collective title Beetle Bailey and His Friends. June Foray did the voice of Bunny, plus all of the female characters involved.

Beetle and Sgt. Snorkel were featured prominently in the animated television film Popeye Meets the Man Who Hated Laughter, which debuted on October 7, 1972, as an episode of The ABC Saturday Superstar Movie. In the beginning of the show, General Halftrack, and Lt. Flap also appeared in the Chinese Restaurant scene.

=== 1989 special ===
A 30-minute animated TV special co-written by Mort Walker and Hank Saroyan was produced for CBS in 1989, but did not air due to management changes at the CBS network. It has been released on DVD alongside the 1960s cartoons. Greg Whalen played Beetle, Bob Bergen portrayed Killer, Henry Corden was Sgt. Snorkel, Frank Welker was both Zero and Otto, Linda Gary voiced both Miss Buxley and Ms. Blips and General Halftrack was Larry Storch. This special was one of a number of specials made in the same timeframe by King Features/Hearst for TV as potential series pilots; others included Blondie & Dagwood (co-produced with Marvel Productions, who had also collaborated with King Features for the Defenders of the Earth series a few years before) and Hägar the Horrible (co-produced with Hanna-Barbera Productions).

== Musical theatre ==
In 1988, a musical based on the comic strip premiered at Candlewood Playhouse in New Fairfield, Connecticut, for a limited run. Music and lyrics were by Neil and Gretchen Gould. In addition to the familiar characters from the strip, the plot introduced a wayward computer that promoted Bailey to three-star general.

== Other media ==
Over the years, Beetle Bailey characters have been licensed for dolls, T-shirts, salt and pepper shakers, toys, telephones, music boxes, handpuppets, coffee mugs, cookie jars, neckties, lunchboxes, paperback books, games, bobblehead nodders, banks, lapel pins and greeting cards. The Multiple Plastics Corporation manufactured a 1964 Camp Swampy playset, a tie-in with the cartoon TV show, with character figures accompanying the usual MPC toy GIs and military vehicles.

In 2000, Dark Horse Comics issued two collectible figures of Beetle and Sarge as part of their line of Classic Comic Characters—statues No. 11 and 12, respectively. In honor of the strip's 50th anniversary, DHC also produced a boxed PVC figure set of seven Beetle Bailey characters (Beetle, Sarge, Gen. Halftrack, Miss Buxley, Otto, Lt. Flap and Cookie).

BCI Eclipse has released 20 episodes of Beetle Bailey as part of Animated All Stars, a 2-DVD set (BCI 46952). Rhino Home Video also released a DVD containing 10 episodes, along with a couple of Hägar the Horrible and Betty Boop cartoons. In 2007, Beetle Bailey: The Complete Collection was released to DVD, containing all 50 shorts grouped randomly into 13 episodes, plus a previously unaired 1989 TV special.

For Beetle Bailey's 50th anniversary in 2000, Gate offered a 1/18th Willys MB with figurines of Beetle, Sarge and Otto.

In 2010, fashion designer Dr. X and Bloomingdale's unveiled a limited edition retro/punk rock style line of clothing including T-shirts, leather jackets, Beetle-themed Chuck Taylors shoes and various accessories.

In 2012, Rolex and Bamford Watch Department created a Beetle Bailey Rolex watch.

== Books ==
All titles by Mort Walker. Published by Ace Tempo/Grosset & Dunlap, unless otherwise noted. Year of publication is often based on King Features Syndicate copyright dates for lack of a book date. Book numbers for mass-market paperbacks (from the cover of the earliest available copy) are given before year of publication, for chronological purposes.

- Beetle Bailey and Sarge (1958) Dell (trade PB; illustrations, reprinted 1954-58 strips)
- Beetle Bailey: A Strip Book (1966) Saalfield Books
- Beetle Bailey (No. 1) (T-884, 1968)
- Fall Out Laughing, Beetle Bailey (No. 2) (5305, 1969)
- At Ease, Beetle Bailey (No. 3) (5329, 1970)
- I Don't Want to Be Out Here Any More Than You Do, Beetle Bailey (No. 4) (5348, 1970)
- What Is It Now, Beetle Bailey (No. 5) (5377, 1971)
- Beetle Bailey on Parade (No. 6) (5416, 1972)
- We're All in the Same Boat, Beetle Bailey (No. 7) (5561, 1973)
- I'll Throw the Book at You, Beetle Bailey (No. 8) (5582, 1973)
- Shape Up or Ship Out, Beetle Bailey (No. 9) (5708, 1974)
- Backstage at the Strips (1975) Mason/Charter
- Take Ten, Beetle Bailey (No. 10) (1975) (see also unnumbered 1989 Jove edition)
- I've Got You on My List, Beetle Bailey (12104, No. 11) (1975)
- Take a Walk, Beetle Bailey (No. 12) (12603, 1976)
- I Thought You Had the Compass, Beetle Bailey (No. 13) (12605, 1976)
- Is That All, Beetle Bailey (No. 14) (12613, 1976)
- About Face, Beetle Bailey (No. 15) (12618, 1976)
- I'll Flip You for It, Beetle Bailey (No. 16) (0-448-14037-3, 1977) ($.95 copy)
- I'll Flip You for It, Beetle Bailey (16861, 1977) (1.75 copy)
- I Just Want to Talk to You, Beetle Bailey (No. 17) (14142, 1977)
- Lookin' Good, Beetle Bailey (No. 18) (14143, 1977)
- I Don't Want to Hear About it, Beetle Bailey (0-141-05305-X, 1977) (distributed by Ace)
- Give Us a Smile, Beetle Bailey (No. 19) (17029-9, 1979)
- Peace, Beetle Bailey (No. 20) (1979; 0-441-05248-7 for 1984 Charter edition))
- Don't Make Me Laugh, Beetle Bailey (No. 21) (16977-0, 1979)
- Up, Up and Away, Beetle Bailey (17203-8, 1980)
- You're Out of Hup, Beetle Bailey (No. 22) (17332-8, 1980)
- Who's in Charge Here, Beetle Bailey (No. 23) (16932-0, 1980)
- Is This Another Complaint, Beetle Bailey (No. 24) (0-448-13777-1, 1981)
- Would It Help to Say I'm Sorry, Beetle Bailey (No. 25) (0-441-91840-9, 1981)
- Beetle Bailey: You Crack Me Up (US 50846–7, 1981) Tor
- Beetle Bailey: Flying High (49-003-8, 1981) Tor
- Otto (16839-1, 1982)
- Miss Buxley: Sexism in Beetle Bailey? (1982) Comicana
- Beetle Bailey: Activity Game Challenge (0-448-15530-3, 1982)
- Beetle Bailey: Potato Fancakes! (Pinnacle 41-338-6, 1980-84?) Tor
- Beetle Bailey: In the Soup (1980-84?) Tor
- Beetle Bailey: Dog-Gone (1980-84?) Tor
- Beetle Bailey: Not Reverse! (49-001-1, 1980-84?) Tor
- Beetle Bailey: Flying High Giant Size (49-003-8, 1981) Tor
- Beetle Bailey: Hey There! (1982) Tor
- Beetle Bailey Joke Book (1982) Tor
- Beetle Bailey: The Rough Riders (1982) Tor
- Beetle Bailey: General Alert (1982) Tor
- Beetle Bailey: Rise and Shine (49-051-8, 1983) Tor, $1.75
- Beetle Bailey: Rise and Shine Giant Size (still 49-051-8, 1983) Tor, $2.50 (includes strips from another book, possibly Play to Win)
- Beetle Bailey: Double Trouble (1983) Tor
- Beetle Bailey: Take Ten (US 56-092-2, 1984) Tor
- Beetle Bailey: Surprise Package (US 56105–8, 1984) Tor
- Beetle Bailey: Tough Luck Giant Size (US 56098–11984)
- Beetle Bailey: Operation Good Times (No. 26) (0-441-05250-9, 1984) Charter
- You'll Get a Bang Out of This, Beetle Bailey (No. 27) (0-441-05254-1, 1984) Charter
- Beetle Bailey in "Friends" (1984) Dargaud
- Beetle Bailey in Too Many Sergeants (1984) Dargaud
- Beetle Bailey in The System (1984) Dargaud
- The Best of Beetle Bailey (1984, 2005) HRW
- The Best of Beetle Bailey: A Thirty-Three Year Treasury (1984, 2007) Comicana
- Beetle Bailey: Strategic Withdrawal Giant Size (US 56105–8, 1985) Tor
- Beetle Bailey: Thin Air Giant Size (56109-0, 1985) Tor
- You're All Washed Up, Beetle Bailey (No. 28) (0-441-05298-3, 1985) Charter
- Beetle Bailey: Hard Knocks (No. 29) (0-441-05260-61985)
- Beetle Bailey: Three's a Crowd Giant Size (US 56112–1, 1986) Tor
- Beetle Bailey: Revenge (1986) Tor
- Beetle Bailey: Uncle Sam Wants You (US 56115–5, 1986) Tor
- Big Hits from Beetle Bailey (No. 30) (0-441-05263-0, 1986) Charter
- Did You Fix the Brakes, Beetle Bailey (No. 31) (1986) Jove
- Beetle Bailey: Life's a Beach! (US 56117–1, 1987) Tor
- Beetle Bailey: Undercover Operation (US 56119–8, 1987)
- What's the Joke, Beetle Bailey (No. 32) (0-441-05279-7, 1987) Charter
- Let's Change Places, Beetle Bailey (No. 33) (0-515-09088-3, 1987) Jove
- Beetle Bailey: That Sinking Feeling (US 56124–4, 1988) Tor
- Beetle Bailey: Behind the Eight Ball Again! (No. 34) (0-515–09529-X, 1988) Jove
- Beetle Bailey: Quit Hangin' Around! (No. 35) (0-515-09890-8, 1988) Tor
- Beetle Bailey: Welcome to Camp Swampy! (US 56126–0, 1989)
- Beetle Bailey: Separate Checks (US 56128–7, 1989) Tor
- Beetle Bailey: Quit Clowning Around (US 56130–9, 1989) Tor
- Beetle Bailey: Wiped Out! (No. 36) (0-515-10040-4, 1989) Jove
- Beetle Bailey: World's Laziest Private (No. 37) (0-515-10134-6, 1989) Jove
- Beetle Bailey: Celebration (1989) Andrews McMeel
- Beetle Bailey: Beetle Mania! (1990) Tor
- Beetle Bailey: A Flying Beetle? (1990) Tor
- Beetle Bailey: Advanced Planning (US 50868–8, 1990)
- Beetle Bailey: Sarge Is a Dope! (1990) Tor
- Beetle Bailey: Basket Case (No. 38) (0-5-10219-9, 1990) Jove
- Beetle Bailey: New Outfit! (No. 39) (0-515-10313-6, 1990) Jove
- Beetle Bailey: Another Request for Furlough (No. 40) (0-515-10406-X, 1990) Jove
- Beetle Bailey: Table Service (No. 41) (0-515-10499-X, 1991) Jove
- Beetle Bailey: Let's Grab a Bite! (No. 42) (0-515-10575-9, 1991) Jove
- Beetle Bailey: Wha' Happen? (No. 43) (0-515-10673-9, 1991) Jove
- Beetle Bailey: Beetle Bugged (No. 44) (0-515-10759-X, 1992) Jove
- Beetle Bailey: Corporal Punishment (No. 45) (1992) Jove
- Beetle Bailey: Keep Peeling (No. 46) (0-515-11086-8, 1992) Jove
- Beetle Bailey: Tattle "Tail" (No. 47) (0-515-10988-6, 1992) Jove
- Beetle Bailey: Dream Team (No. 48) (1993) Jove
- Beetle Bailey: Camp Swampy Strikes Again! (No. 49) (0-515-11288-7, 1993) Jove
- Beetle Bailey: Still Lazy After All These Years (1999) NBM
- 50 Years of Beetle Bailey (2000) NBM
- Beetle Bailey Book and Figure Set: Sarge (2001) Dark Horse Comics
- Beetle Bailey Book and Figure Set: Beetle (2001) Dark Horse Comics
- Beetle Bailey Book and Figure Set: Miss Buxley (2001) Dark Horse Comics
- Beetle Bailey Book and Figure Set: General Halftrack (2001) Dark Horse Comics
- Mort Walker's Private Scrapbook (2001) Andrews McMeel
- Beetle Bailey, The First Years: 1950–1952 (2008) Checker
- Beetle Bailey, Daily and Sunday Strips: 1965 (2010) Titan Books
- Beetle Bailey, Daily and Sunday Strips: 1966 (2012) Titan Books
- Mort Walker's Beetle Bailey: 75 Years of Smiles (2025) Fantagraphics
