= Hi and Lois =

Comic strip

- Hi and Lois
- Author(s): Mort Walker and drawn by Dik Browne; Brian and Greg Walker and drawn by Eric Reaves
- Current status/schedule: Running
- Launch date: October 18, 1954; 71 years ago
- Syndicate(s): King Features Syndicate
- Genre(s): Humor, Gag-a-day

Hi and Lois is an American comic strip about a suburban family. Created by Mort Walker and illustrated by Dik Browne, the strip is currently run by Walker's sons Brian and Greg and illustrated by Eric Reaves. It debuted on October 18, 1954, distributed by King Features Syndicate.

== Publication history ==
The Flagstons first appeared in Walker's Beetle Bailey. They spun off into their own strip, written by Walker and drawn by Browne. Lois Flagston (née Bailey) is Beetle Bailey's sister and the two strips make occasional crossovers. One of these occurred on the strip's 40th anniversary in 1994, when Beetle visited his sister Lois and her family. Chip resembles his Uncle Beetle in attitude and appearance, especially the eyes.

The Best of Hi and Lois (1986) was reprinted in 2005.

The strip made efforts to keep up with the times, such as housewife Lois Flagston taking a career in real estate in 1980. In previous decades, the strip was acclaimed; in 1962, it earned Browne a Reuben Award from the National Cartoonists Society.

The strip faced some controversy given the changes in content restrictions since its debut in the 1950s. Once, editors insisted that belly buttons could not appear; in protest, Browne included a box of dimpled navel oranges.

Now produced by the sons of the original creative team, the strip is written by Brian and Greg Walker and drawn by Eric Reaves. Reaves became the sole illustrator after the death of Robert "Chance" Browne in 2024.

As of 2016, Hi and Lois appears in 1,000 newspapers around the world.

=== Comic books ===
Hi and Lois was occasionally featured in Dell Comics' Four Color Comics series in the 50's.

The feature also had its own short-lived series from Charlton Comics. Eleven issues were produced from November 1969 to July 1971. The cover price was fifteen cents.

=== TV animation ===
Hi and Lois were featured prominently in the animated television film Popeye Meets the Man Who Hated Laughter, which debuted on ABC on October 7, 1972, as part of the network's anthology series The ABC Saturday Superstar Movie.

== Characters ==
- Hi and Lois Flagston: Hi (short for Hiram) and Lois are typical middle-class American suburbanites. Their names are a pun on the "opposite" terms of "high and low". Hi is a sales manager, Lois is a realtor and is sister to Beetle Bailey. They have four children.
  - Chip: a slovenly, indolent, teenaged high school boy; a running gag has Chip dating new girlfriends. Eight years old at the time the strip started, Chip grew into his teenage years by sometime in the 1960s, where he has stayed.
  - Dot and Ditto: rambunctious twins Dot (girl) and Ditto (boy), four-year-olds when the strip began, now (and since the late sixties) grade school-aged; Dot is the better student of the two.
  - Trixie: the Flagstons' freckled, blonde infant daughter, who loves "talking" (through thought balloons) to Sunbeam, a ray of sunlight. While the other children have aged, Trixie has not.
- Dawg: the Flagstons' large, lazy, shaggy sheepdog.
- Thirsty Thurston: the Flagstons' fat, lazy, and frequently tipsy next-door neighbor; Hi's co-worker and golf buddy.
- Irma Thurston: Thirsty's thin, weary, and long-suffering wife.
- Abercrombie and Fitch: the friendly neighborhood garbage collectors. Their names are taken from the elite outfitter of sporting and excursion goods of that era.
- Mr. Foofram: Owner and president of Foofram Industries, where Hi and Thirsty work. Diminutive and at times short-tempered, but not a tyrant like J. C. Dithers from Blondie.
- Mr. Wavering: An elderly neighbor of Hi and Lois; he served as a corporal in the United States Marine Corps.

== Reception ==
Ron Goulart praised Dik Browne's artwork for the strip, stating "Browne made Hi and Lois one of the most visually interesting strips on the comics page." In an article for Entertainment Weekly reviewing then-current comic strips, Ken Tucker gave Hi and Lois a B+ rating, and added that it had the "gentlest humor" of all the Mort Walker comic strips.

== Collections and reprints ==
(All titles by Mort Walker and Dik Browne unless otherwise noted)

- Trixie (1960) Avon
- Hi and Lois (1970) Tempo Books
- Hi and Lois in Darkest Suburbia (1971) Tempo
- Hi and Lois: Beware! Children at Play (1972) Tempo
- Hi and Lois: On the Grill (1973) Tempo
- Hi and Lois: Family Album (1973) Tempo
- Hi and Lois: Family Ties (1979) Tempo
- Hi and Lois: Mama's Home (1982) Tempo
- Hi and Lois: Suburban Cowboys (1982) Tempo
- Hi and Lois: Father Figure (1982) Tempo
- Hi and Lois: American Gothic (1983) Tempo
- Hi and Lois: Dishwasher, Lawnmower or Snowplow? (1983) Tor
- Hi and Lois: Home Sweat Home (1983) Tor
- Hi and Lois: "Is Dinner Ready?" (1983) Tor
- Hi and Lois: Saturday Night Fever (1983) Tor
- Hi and Lois: "Hi Honey, I'm Home!" (1984) Tor
- Hi and Lois: Mom, Where's My Homework? (1984) Tor
- Hi and Lois: The Bright Stuff (1984) Charter
- Hi and Lois: "How Do You Spell Dad?" (1985) Tor
- Hi and Lois: Trixie à la Mode (1986) Tor
- Hi and Lois: Good Housekeeping (1986) Tor
- Hi and Lois: Dawg Day Afternoon! (1986) Tor
- The Best of Hi and Lois (1986, 2005) Comicana
- Hi and Lois: Sleep-Can (1987) Tor
- Hi and Lois: Say "Cheese" (1987) Tor
- Hi and Lois: Sleepbusters! (1987) Tor
- Hi and Lois: House Calls (1988) Tor
- Hi and Lois: Modern Chaos! (1989) Tor
- Hi and Lois: Croquet for a Day (1989) Tor
- Hi and Lois: Couch Potatoes! (1990) Tor
- Hi and Lois: Wheels of Fortune (1990) Tor
- Hi and Lois: Happy Campers (1990) Tor
- Here Comes the Sun: A Hi and Lois Collection (1990) Avon
- Hi and Lois: Mister Popularity (1991) Tor
- Hi and Lois: Play Ball! (1991) Tor
- Hi and Lois: Up Two Late (1991) Tor
- Hi and Lois: Baby Talk (1991) Tor
- Hi and Lois: Sunday Best by Brian and Greg Walker and Chance Browne (2005) ECW Press
