= Zombie strip =

Comic strip active without the creator

A zombie strip (also known as a legacy strip) is a comic strip whose creator has died or retired, but which continues to exist with new installments in syndication done by a succeeding writer or artist, most often relatives of the original creator. Zombie comic strips are often criticized as lacking the "spark" that had originally made the strip successful.

== Reasons and criticism ==
The usual reason for continuing a strip with a new cartoonist is to keep the profitable business or franchise going, preserving a number of jobs and allowing future generations to enjoy the work in a new form. Both the creator's relatives and the strip's syndicate stand to make significant money in royalties. In the early days of comic strips, it was commonplace for a strip to be taken over by successors once the original cartoonist died. One of the earliest high-profile cartoonists to reject this was George Herriman, who decreed that his strip Krazy Kat not be continued after his death; Herriman died in 1944, after which Krazy Kat was canceled.

The practice of continuing a zombie comic strip is commonly criticized by cartoonists, particularly younger ones in the new generation, including Bill Watterson and Stephan Pastis. Pastis addressed the issue in his strip, Pearls Before Swine, in 2005. Mark Tatulli also commented on zombie strips in his strip Liō in 2010 and in 2013. After an incident in which United Feature Syndicate secretly retained the services of superhero comic artist Al Plastino to continue the comic strip Peanuts in case of an interruption, the heirs of Charles Schulz, author and creator of Peanuts, requested that his strip not be continued by another cartoonist after his death. Since Schulz died in 2000, Peanuts has continued in reruns under two lines: Classic Peanuts and Peanuts Begins.

The principal criticism directed toward continuing a zombie strip is that the replacement cartoonist is seen as generally less funny or less inspired than the creator, or that the new cartoonist does not have the same style of writing or understand the characters as well. The death of the cartoonist and the strip's succession into zombie status thus is akin to the concept of "jumping the shark", in that the strip never returns to the quality or popularity it had during the run by the original cartoonist. An additional criticism is that continuing such strips prevents newer cartoonists from entering the business by filling newspaper space that might be devoted to new strips. However, in numerous cases, the new head cartoonist has often been the assistant of the former, as Dennis the Menace, after Hank Ketcham's retirement, was developed by his former assistants who have taken over, similar to sporting coaches in a coaching tree, the new head cartoonist has been an understudy of the former. Often the new cartoonist has developed the strip over a few years. As another counterpoint, zombie strips can also provide proving grounds for unknown artists to prove their worth with an established brand; Jerry Scott began his national career writing and illustrating Ernie Bushmiller's Nancy, being given substantial artistic freedom in the process, before debuting his strips, Baby Blues and Zits. In other cases, some strips have passed within the families of the original artist. Such has taken place most notably with the families of Bil Keane (The Family Circus), Johnny Hart (B.C. and The Wizard of Id), and Mort Walker (Beetle Bailey and Hi and Lois), whose strips are currently written by Jeff Keane (Bil Keane's son), Mason Mastroianni (Johnny Hart's grandson), and brothers Brian and Greg Walker (Mort Walker's sons), respectively.

== Examples ==
Zombie strips include Adam@home, Andy Capp, Blondie, Dennis the Menace, B.C., The Wizard of Id, Frank and Ernest, Hi and Lois, Hägar the Horrible, Dick Tracy, Rex Morgan, M.D., Mary Worth, Prince Valiant, The Family Circus, The Born Loser, Shoe, Spy vs. Spy, Barney Google and Snuffy Smith, and Ginger Meggs. Now-defunct strips that were zombies for a time before being discontinued include Terry and the Pirates, Little Orphan Annie, and Brenda Starr.

Additional examples include strips that still have an association with their original author but receive significant assistance from others. The most widely known example of this is the widely syndicated Garfield, which was created and is still managed by Jim Davis but is currently written and drawn by staff at Paws, Inc., which handles his brand licensing rights, and as of 2025, is a subsidiary of Paramount Skydance, whose corporate predecessor acquired the Garfield franchise in 2019. Other examples are the multi-generational strips, such as B.C., The Wizard of Id, Hi and Lois, Beetle Bailey, and The Family Circus. In those cases, the strips in later years were drawn by the original author with other family members. Following the deaths of the original authors, the next generation in the families continued their respective strips

Outside of comic strips, the idea of a production continuing without its creator is not uncommon at all, as creators typically do not own the rights to their work. For example, SpongeBob SquarePants creator Stephen Hillenburg largely stepped away from the show after 2004, but continued to serve as executive producer before returning to more active involvement in 2015 until his death three years later. Similarly, Nickelodeon continued to produce episodes of The Ren & Stimpy Show even after firing the show's creator, John Kricfalusi.

== See also ==
- Jumping the Shark
