= Computer Entertainer =

Video game newsletter

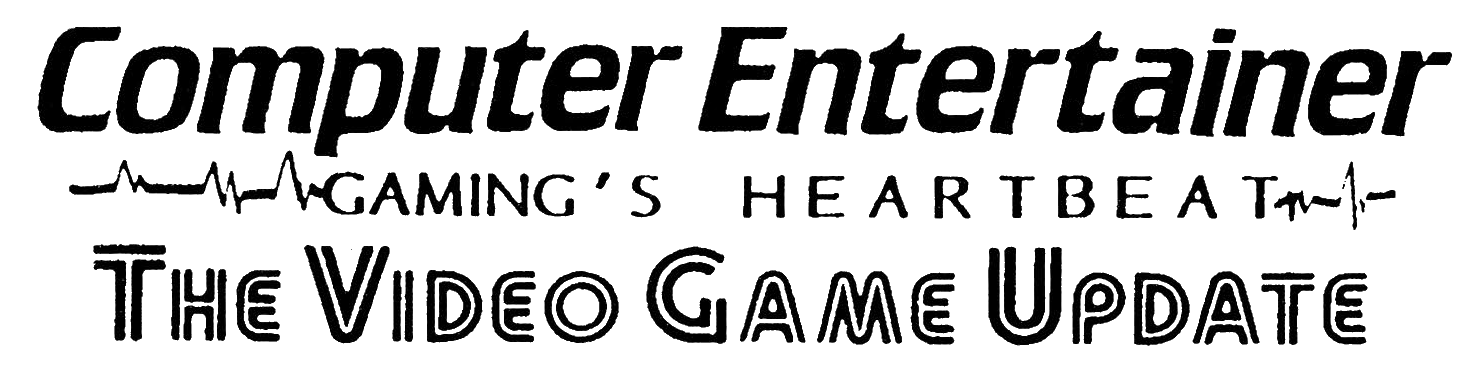
- 1989 issue
- Editor: Celeste Dolan
- Categories: Video game journalism
- Frequency: Monthly
- Circulation: 10,000
- Publisher: Marylou Badeaux
- First issue: January 1982
- Final issue: July 1990
- Company: VTO Inc.
- Country: United States
- Based in: Los Angeles, California
- Language: English
- ISSN: 0890-2143
- OCLC: 14192197

Computer Entertainer, also known as The Video Game Update, was an American video game newsletter. Based out of Los Angeles, California and edited by Celeste Dolan, it was published monthly between 1982 and 1990, and one of the few publications to survive the 1983 video game crash in North America. It regularly featured news and reviews of computer and home console software, sales charts, coverage of the annual Consumer Electronics Show, interviews with developers in the video game industry, and release dates. Since its discontinuation, it is currently owned by the Video Game History Foundation.

== History ==
Computer Entertainer was a newsletter for a mail order retailer called Video Take-Out, which was located in North Hollywood, Los Angeles and started as a supplier of blank and pre-recorded VHS tapes. The store's general manager, Celeste Dolan, told Billboard in August 1982 they had begun business two and a half years earlier but that product demand had fluctuated the past year. They chose to begin sales of video games due to its stronger market at the time and for being "a natural extension of selling video tape", even claiming Video Take-Out to be one of the original outlets for Atari 2600 games. Video Take-Out sent the first issue of its newsletter, originally without a proper name, to customers in January 1982 as an information guide for its customers. For its 4th issue in July 1982, the newsletter assumed the name "The Video Game Update", coined by a reader in a naming contest. Dolan was its chief editor alongside Marylou Badeaux, who was also credited as its publisher.

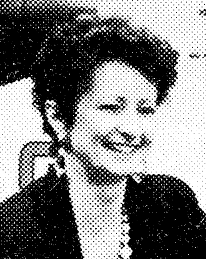
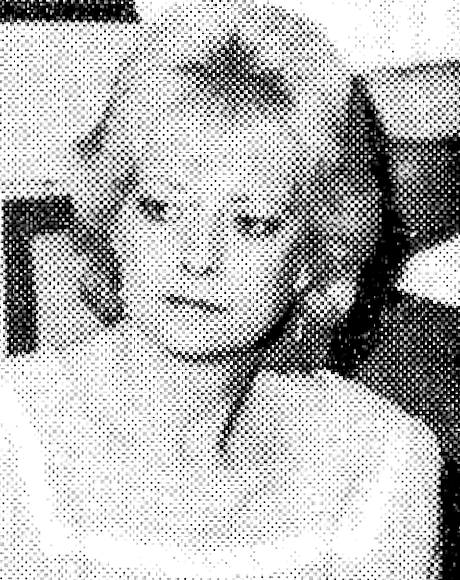
Computer Entertainer was co-edited by sisters Marylou Badeaux (left) and Celeste Dolan (right).

The monthly newsletter most prominently featured news and reviews of computer and home console software. It survived the video game crash of 1983 and covered the rise of industry juggernauts Nintendo and Sega as well as the introduction of CD-ROM technology. Other features included sales charts, reports of the annual Consumer Electronics Show, interviews with developers, and release dates. Game evaluations could be found in the Critically Speaking sections in every issue. Titles were rated based on gameplay and graphics except text adventure which were not given graphical scores. While Dolan was the designated review editor, Computer Entertainer later introduced writer and game designer Jeffrey Stanton as a staff reviewer. An extensive game release schedule was provided each month. The staff would contact game publishers directly to obtain and report accurate information and dates would be regularly updated to reflect cancelations and changes.

Dolan served on the award selection committee alongside other video game journalists for The First Video Games Conference, which was co-sponsored by Billboard and the Video Marketing Game Letter and held in San Francisco in April 1983. The periodical was permanently renamed Computer Entertainer in April 1984. It was announced in the February 1985 issue that Video Take-Out had partnered with Sydney Software to exclusively distribute Best of B.C., a compilation of the Coleco Adam games B.C.'s Quest for Tires and B.C. II: Grog's Revenge. Just prior to the release in April, Computer Entertainer stated that the companies had halted all future collaborations due to the threat of piracy by Adam users and its potentially negative financial impact.

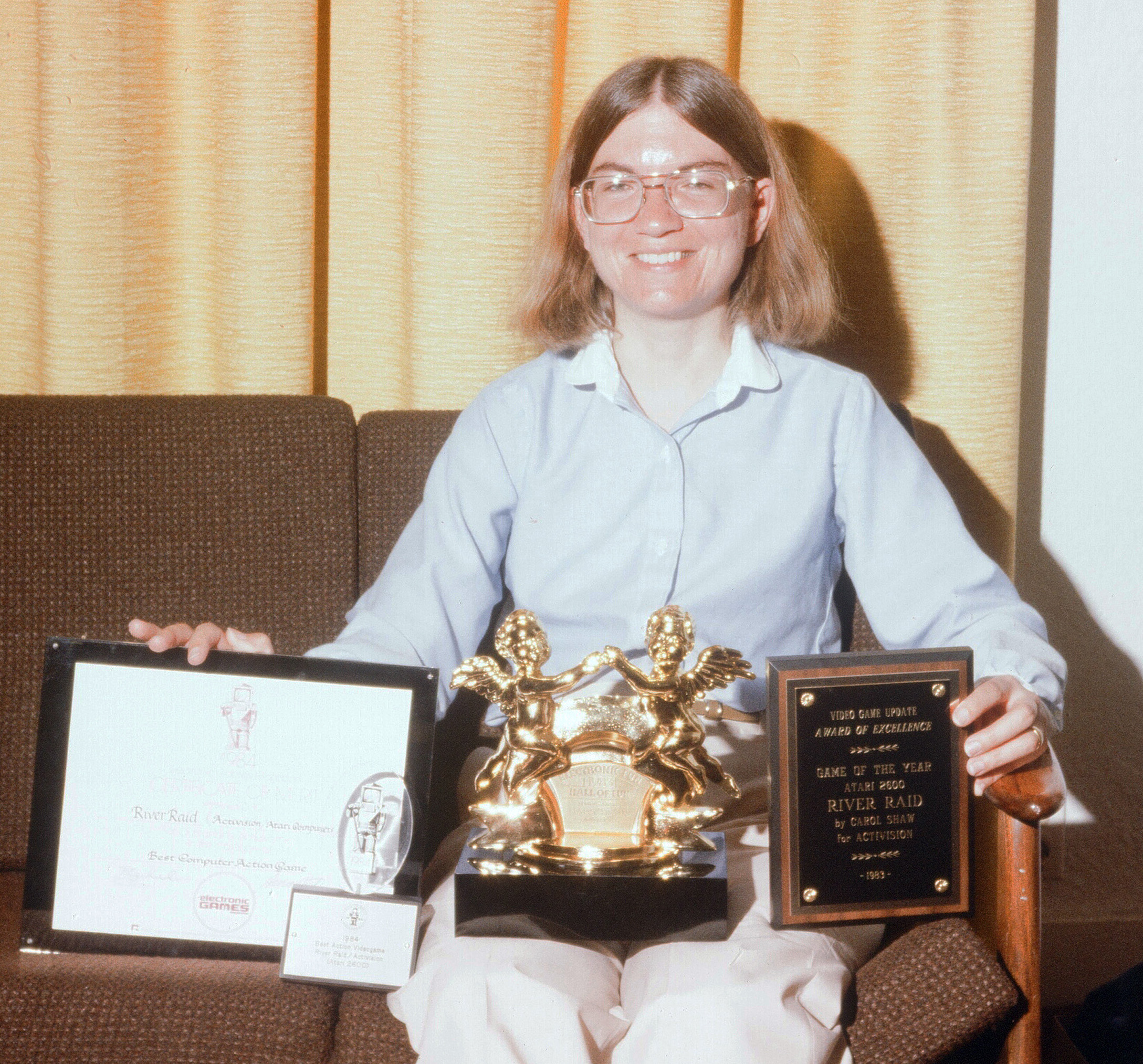
Carol Shaw holding the Video Game Update award in her left hand for River Raid (1982)

Video Takeout launched its own bulletin board system for southern California called The Hotline in early 1986, which included an online version of Computer Entertainer and weekly columns by Dan Gutman. Print circulation for the newsletter reached up to around 10,000 copies by as early as 1987. According to the April 1987 issue the publisher moved its office to Van Nuys. The business moved again around January 1990 and Computer Entertainer continued publication until abruptly ending that July with a total of 100 issues, one special edition, and one index.

A 2014 documentary series featured Computer Entertainer in the collection of gaming historian Frank Cifaldi. He alleged that the newsletter's 1986 review of Super Mario Bros. for the Nintendo Entertainment System was the first and only English-language review of the game's original release. Websites such as IGN and Kotaku recited this claim.

In 2025, the Video Game History Foundation, founded by Cifaldi, acquired the rights to host the full archive of Computer Entertainer for public access under a Creative Commons license.
