= Weapon Brown =

Comic book

Weapon Brown is a 2002 comic book published by Death Ray Graphics and written by Jason Yungbluth, the author of Deep Fried, an anthology comic also published by Death Ray Graphics, in which the Weapon Brown character and story first appeared split across four issues in a story called A Peanut Scorned. The entire story was compiled from these four issues of Deep Fried, had new content added, and was then released as a one-shot issue in December 2002.

The story features parodies of the cast of Peanuts as well as a number of parodied objects and settings set in a post-apocalyptic world, and drawn in a darker, more adult style as a direct contrast to the more innocent style used by Charles M. Schulz. The one-shot also includes a back-up feature, A Weapon Brown Christmas which shows a story set sometime before the events of A Peanut Scorned.

A sequel graphic novel, Blockhead's War, was published online on a weekly or semi-weekly basis between April 2007 and December 2012. Comprising 339 installments, the sequel again focuses on the characters of Weapon Brown and Snoopy, but moves beyond parodying the characters/setting of Schulz's Peanuts to involve them with characters and situations based upon hundreds of newspaper-published comic strips dating back to the inception of the form (the installment published October 16, 2012 featured The Yellow Kid, a character/cartoon first appearing in 1895). Characters from Calvin and Hobbes, Little Orphan Annie, Crock, Dilbert, Popeye, B.C., Beetle Bailey, The Boondocks, The Wizard of Id, Broom-Hilda, and Garfield are among those prominently featured. A sequel, Weapon Brown: Aftershock, began some years later and ended in 2022.

The cover to Weapon Brown, showing an image of the eponymous character

== A Peanut Scorned ==
Weapon Brown is set in a post-apocalyptic world, and the story itself centers on the eponymous character Weapon Brown, who is on a mission to rescue the woman he loves from a former acquaintance: Linus Van Pelt, a man who is obsessed with a supernatural entity he calls "the Great Pumpkin". Over the course of the story's events, readers are introduced to a number of characters who are clearly recognizable as adult parodies of well-known Peanuts characters. Weapon Brown and his pet Snoopy are themselves parodies of Charlie Brown and Snoopy. The story begins with Weapon Brown having an encounter with Schroeder, while in the course of looking for Linus' sister Lucy. While he gets no information from the piano player about Lucy's whereabouts, he does learn that a woman named Patty - later revealed to be the Weapon Brown incarnation of Peppermint Patty - would know where Lucy is and directs Weapon Brown to ask her at the whorehouse she owns, which he does, greeting Patty with a slap to the face, an action she recognizes as being distinctly exclusive to Weapon Brown and greets him with a kiss.

After meeting with Patty, he learns where to find Lucy, and before heading off to confront her spends the night at Patty's whorehouse, where he has a brief nightmare about how he was transformed into a one-man cyborg army. Awakening from this nightmare, and not remembering much of anything in it, he confronts Lucy, looking for information about Linus. While she has no idea where Linus is, she does know quite a bit about Weapon Brown, as she was one of the people who helped transform him into a killer. A confrontation between the two leads to Weapon Brown slaying her, but not before he drags out of her an idea of where Linus might be: the Pumpkin Patch, the area where the destructive Zinger Bombs which essentially destroyed the world first fell.

After a brief battle with an anthropomorphic and excessively hungry tree — described as an 'arboreal weapon' left over from the Fourth World War — Weapon Brown finally locates his quarry and the woman he has gone so far to rescue.

A brief battle ends with Weapon Brown defeated and imprisoned by Linus, thanks to a quasi-sentient life form Linus has psychic control over (which Linus refers to as his 'Security Blanket'), who is attempting to raise "the Great Pumpkin". Astonishingly, he succeeds, but Weapon Brown breaks free of his confinement and destroys Linus' blanket. Shocked at the death of his weapon, Linus then falls victim to the Pumpkin itself, which kills Linus, Weapon Brown's younger sister, and the woman Weapon Brown has come to save. The sole survivors of the encounter are Weapon Brown and Snoopy, who leave the Pumpkin Patch, their fates from that point on related in the sequel, "Blockhead's War".

== A Weapon Brown Christmas ==
This short story is set sometime before the events of A Peanut Scorned and features Weapon Brown as he ventures into the wastes to find a scrawny-looking tree, whose cells are the cure to a disease contracted by scientists who work for a mysterious conglomerate referred to as the Syndicate. The tree's owner, however, mistook Weapon Brown's comments as meaning that the cyborg was after his son. He is slain in an attempt to protect his child by Weapon Brown, who was himself unaware of how his words had been misinterpreted, as he was unaware that the man he had been speaking with had a child.

Said child is confronted by Weapon Brown when he enters the man's hut to retrieve the tree and upon seeing his father dead, pleads with Weapon Brown to be allowed to go with him, which Brown flatly refuses to do, stating that he already has a pet. He advises the child to stay outside and watch the light show his father had created, saying that "maybe Santa Claus will show up." The story ends with the child, now sitting in the snow as a snowstorm has buried his dead father, singing to himself, with the implication being that he will eventually freeze to death himself.

== It's the Great Pumpkin, Weapon Brown ==
In this short comic, included in the omnibus book, Linus Van Pelt and Sally Brown attempt to summon the Great Pumpkin via a sexual ritual; the horrific "Pumpkin Patch" is the locale.

== It's the Easter Mongrel, Weapon Brown ==
This is a short comic featuring a young "Chuck", living by his wits; at the "Daisy Hill Puppy Farm", he battles evil giant rabbits and an immense bird called a "woodie" (a reference to Woodstock), with the help of a puppy, descended from the genetically altered war dogs bred at the "Farm", and takes him home. Shermy, Weapon Brown's friend, appears in this story.

== Blockhead's War ==
This long comic series ran over a period of years on Jason Yungbluth's website, and was later collected into an omnibus volume with the other Weapon Brown stories. It follows Weapon Brown and Snoopy as they fight their way across a post-apocalyptic wasteland, and ally with Anne (a version of Little Orphan Annie), Pops (Popeye), and The Boondocks characters Hughie and Reilly against the Syndicate, and its Cyber Augmented Legionnaire Version 1.N, a villain who is an adult version of the boy from Calvin and Hobbes. Cal is accompanied by a stuffed toy which can transform into a huge cyborg tiger named HOBS. The story ends with Weapon Brown heading off to new adventures.

== Weapon Brown: Aftershock ==
"Aftershock" began posting on November 19, 2019. This semi-sequel sees several characters telling "campfire stories" about Weapon Brown and his exploits in an 'unreliable narrator' context. Each tale is told with a different art style and the Weapon Brown versions of Steve Dallas, Peppermint Patty, Joe Btfsplk and Pops/Popeye are among the tale-tellers. The Patty character's tale involves Weapon Brown's meeting with the Little Red-Haired Girl, an enemy whom he comes to love. The events of "A Peanut Scorned" presumably follow. "Aftershock" ended in 2022.

== Cast of characters ==
The characters and settings of the world of Weapon Brown are intended as parodies of the world of Charles M. Schulz's beloved Peanuts characters. There are roughly 14 characters seen in "A Peanut Scorned" who can be seen and recognized by name and look as Peanuts parodies, and one who is mentioned only briefly, making for a grand total of 15. Several additional minor characters such as Peggy Jean (labeled "Peg-Me Jean") and Harold Angel appear in "Aftershock".

Weapon Brown: The eponymous character from the book and star of all stories save for It's the Great Pumpkin, Weapon Brown, in which he does not appear. Weapon Brown looks like an adult version of Charlie Brown complete with his classic curled hair on his forehead. In the special material added to the story for the Weapon Brown one-shot, Weapon Brown is shown with a full head of hair, rather than the seemingly "bald" look Charlie Brown sports in the original strips and animation as a way to distinguish the character from Charlie Brown, who many people mistakenly think is bald because of the way he is depicted in various media. His resemblance to the classic Charlie Brown is explained by the explosion of a number of "Zinger Bombs" which detonated not far from where he was playing, causing him to be caught in the backwash from the blasts and which also cost him most of his hair, meaning that Weapon Brown, unlike the classic Charlie Brown, actually is mostly bald. He also wears a shirt that is a near-exact duplicate of the one worn by Charlie Brown, though much larger and heavily shredded from years of use.

Weapon Brown has a cybernetic right arm which bears a radiation hazard sign at the shoulder, is powered by a "reactor", and is armed with a "plaz gun", which appears to be a weapon that fires bolts of energy. He also possesses enhanced strength, senses, and reflexes. By the time of A Peanut Scorned, much of his cybernetic arm's interior workings are visible, while it is shown as looking brand-new in A Weapon Brown Christmas. Weapon Brown's first name is revealed as being 'Charles' at various points in the story. The first point is a reference to him by the name "Chuck" by Patty, and later in a dream sequence Weapon Brown starts to refer to himself as "Charlie", only to be cut off by Lucy. Linus later reveals Weapon Brown's name as Charles.

Weapon Brown is one of a number of victims of an organization called "the Syndicate", which was running a super-soldier program called Project Peanuts, which appears to have been intended to create living weapons, with at least two known success stories. Weapon Brown and Lucy both make references to Project Peanuts during the story. While the exact extent of what was done to him is unknown, Weapon Brown claims that they turned him into a one-man army and it is implied that they amputated his original right arm in order to equip him with the cybernetic one he uses from then on.

During a battle narrated in "Weapon Brown: Aftershock", Weapon Brown meets and falls in love with the character known only as The Red Haired Girl, and retires from his life as a killer, taking up as close to a simple life as can be had in the post-apocalyptic world they live in until she is abducted by Linus, which prompts him to take up his old ways in what would eventually be a failed attempt to rescue her.

As with the original Charlie Brown, Weapon Brown owns a dog named Snoopy, and, like the original, this dog in no way resembles a beagle.

Snoopy: Weapon Brown's pet and companion. Although he shares the name, color scheme, and breed with the classic Peanuts character, all resemblance ends there. This version of Snoopy is depicted as being a real dog, with no thought balloons or fantasies of his own (that the reader can see; Hildy, a Broom Hilda-like witch, can see them in Blockhead's War). He is somewhat more intelligent than normal dogs. He is depicted as fiercely loyal to his master. He lost the ability to see with his left eye during the events of It's the Easter Mongrel, Weapon Brown, a story published in the print version of the omnibus. He is the only other survivor of the battle against Linus and follows Weapon Brown all the way through the events of Blockhead's War. At one point when he is injured and dying, he sees himself in a World War One flying helmet and sees other dogs, presumably Snoopy's siblings; on another occasion he drives a Zamboni, and later does the Snoopy dance when the giant tiger HOBS has died. In Aftershock, Snoop flies using a backpack helicopter, a reference to Snoopy's ears forming a helicopter rotor in Peanuts.

Schroeder: Nearly identical to the classic character, this version is a man in his mid-to-late 20s, plays a piano at a bar, and smokes. Like the classic version, he has no interest romantically in Lucy, though this time it is also because she is tied in with "the Syndicate", the same mysterious group which heavily altered Weapon Brown into what he eventually became and which also altered Linus. He is the first character seen in the story clearly, playing Beethoven at the bar where Weapon Brown confronts him.

Peppermint Patty: Like Schroeder, Lucy, Linus, Marcie, and Sally, Peppermint Patty's name is lifted directly from the original and wears an attire meant to showcase her body, though the pattern on her outfit is instantly recognizable as being based on the striped shirt seen on the original Peppermint Patty. Like the classic Peanuts character, she has feelings for Weapon Brown which go unrequited, though it is implied by Weapon Brown that the two have had intimate encounters. Patty runs a whorehouse, and has a business relationship with Lucy. She also is a friend/employer to Marcie. According to both Weapon Brown and Patty herself, the whorehouse Patty runs was originally owned and run by a woman named Violet. Though unseen, Violet is presumably based on the Peanuts character of the same name. In "Aftershock", this character reappears, distinctly more androgynous than before, and tells a tale of Weapon Brown's adventures.

Franklin: Franklin serves as Patty's bouncer and bodyguard, threatening to kill Weapon Brown before she calls him off. In the world of Weapon Brown, Franklin is black as in the original Peanuts; he is apparently the only one of his kind, as Patty claims she has never heard of any others. She refers to him by the term "negro" in the comic, claiming Franklin himself has apparently referred to himself by this term in the conversation she has with Weapon Brown about him. No explanation is given to why Franklin seems to be the only one which exists in this world; however, Franklin's namesake was also the only black character in the world of Peanuts for several years' worth of strips, which may be the basis for Franklin's uniqueness in the world of Weapon Brown. Weapon Brown himself initially believes Franklin is some form of mutant, indicating he has also never seen a black person before. Much later, during the Blockhead's War story, the characters from The Boondocks, "Hughie" and "Reilly", tell Weapon Brown that a 'bleaching virus' has either killed black people or turned them white.

Marcie: A whore in the employ of Patty, she is seen wearing glasses and little else save for bondage rings in her nipples and a bikini bottom in her only full appearance in the story. Patty refers to her as being "Kind of a weird kid" but seems not to mind whatever her "weirdness" is supposed to be. At Weapon Brown's request, she and Patty engage in a lesbian sex show for his entertainment. During the events of "Weapon Brown: Aftershock", Patty speaks of a lover who "keeps her bed warm"; this is presumably the Marcie character, who is unseen.

Pigpen: Seen only in a few panels, the character is portrayed as a desolate drug addict, and is first shown speaking to Lucy Van Pelt about Weapon Brown's attack on Schroeder. He is later seen offering Weapon Brown himself oral sex in exchange for drugs. In a fit of anger, Weapon Brown punches him with his cybernetic arm, apparently fatally.

Lucy Van Pelt: A scientist who worked with the mysterious Syndicate, and who worked on psychologically manipulating Weapon Brown into being a compliant agent for them. The older sister to Linus, Lucy makes reference to the classic skits of Charlie Brown and Lucy wherein Lucy would goad Charlie Brown into attempting to kick a football, only to pull it away at the last moment. She attempts to utilize specialized psychological control cues ("whip words"; his is "blockhead" ) which she helped to develop in order to gain control of Weapon Brown so that she can hand him back over to the Syndicate. However, he breaks free from her when she begins singing the Peanuts song "Failure Face". She is eventually killed by Weapon Brown after being tortured for the location of her brother. Mentioned during, and with a brief cameo in, Blockhead's War, she is only referred to as Van Pelt.

Woodstock: Seen only in two panels as a bird being eaten by Snoopy, this character was almost identical in appearance to the classic character, though he is not named in the brief cameo appearance. In the bonus story "It's the Easter Mongrel, Weapon Brown", enormous Gastornis-like birds called "woodies" pursue a young Chuck, leading to his first meeting with Snoopy.

The Red Haired Girl: The Weapon Brown counterpart to the Little Red-Haired Girl from the Peanuts strips and animation, this character was unnamed aside from being called The Red Haired Girl ("Red", for short) and was Weapon Brown's lover. In "Weapon Brown: Aftershock" we see her original meeting with Weapon Brown and how they fell in love. She was abducted by Linus Van Pelt with the help of Weapon Brown's sister Sally and was unseen throughout most of the story until the final chapter. She was killed when Linus' attempt to summon "The Great Pumpkin" went wrong and the creature crushed her, Linus, and Sally under it.

Linus Van Pelt: Another victim of the Syndicate, Linus has a grotesquely mutated head and is in psychic control of what Weapon Brown tells the reader is a "quasi-sentient, polymer based" life form that Linus calls his "Security Blanket". The life form is kept alive and able to receive Linus' psychic commands via a small "primary computer plexus". Like the classic Peanuts character, this Linus believes in the existence of "the Great Pumpkin"; however, the Linus of this world depicted this version of the normally unseen character as something resembling Cthulhu or the Anti-Christ. In order to raise this creature from another dimension, he abducted Weapon Brown's lover and was intending to sacrifice her to the creature to permanently enable it to move about on Earth. He was distracted by the death of his "Blanket" and this appears to have caused the summoning of the creature to go wrong. He was slain by the Pumpkin as it fell onto him, Sally and the Red Haired Girl.

Sally Brown: Younger sister of Weapon Brown and, like her classic Peanuts counterpart, was in love with Linus. It was for this reason that she helped Linus track down Weapon Brown and his lover and aided in the abduction that brought Weapon Brown back to his old ways. She was crushed when "the Great Pumpkin" fell apart on top of her, Linus, and the Red Haired Girl. She has an exact duplicate of the hairstyle of the original character on whom she is based.

555 95472: This minor Peanuts character, whose name was changed to a number by his father, appears as the bartender in the scene where Schroeder is playing the piano. Jason Yungbluth notes in the omnibus edition of Weapon Brown that the bartender was originally a non-Peanuts character, but upon discovering the character of 555 95472, added this number tattooed on his wrist along with a bar code.

Shermy: Completely unseen in the original story, Weapon Brown makes a brief mention of him being a bounty hunter, and claims that he disappeared somewhere in "the Pumpkin Patch". In It's the Easter Mongrel, Weapon Brown, he is a friend of Weapon Brown and resembles the Peanuts character.

== Creatures/settings/organizations ==
The Great Pumpkin: A parody of the unseen character whom Linus has an unshakable belief in the classic Peanuts media, this creature was a horrific-looking monster which has a number of names all referenced by the Weapon Brown Linus, including Agro Un Rama (a spoof of "Anung Un Rama", the real name of Hellboy), Pepon Grandismo ("Biggest Squash"), and Omega Vegetablus ("Final Vegetable"; the names are bastardized Latin). It is depicted as being a demonic entity similar to the Anti-Christ, and is a source of obsessed worship by Linus. It also speaks in the same row of lines normally used by Woodstock in the comic strip by Schulz. The summoning goes wrong by means unknown, and the creature seems to simply come apart, crushing Linus, Sally, and The Red Haired Girl beneath its mass. Linus was convinced the creature would destroy what was left of the world, and planned to be the creature's high priest.

The Pumpkin Patch: An area of immense radioactivity, the Pumpkin Patch is stated by Weapon Brown as getting its name because "all the shit in the air is likely to make you resemble a pumpkin once you come out." However, he also notes that as a general rule, most people never return from the Patch. As Brown describes it, "nothing grows in the patch except rats and tumors." Weapon Brown and Snoopy are so far the only known individuals who have gone into the Patch and come back out. The Patch is also where the first "Zinger Bombs" were dropped, according to Weapon Brown via in-story monologue. The epicenter of the patch is a massive bomb crater, which sits over what appears to be an underground shelter to be used in the eventuality of nuclear attack. Weapon Brown and Snoopy use the hatch found at the middle of the crater to reach the underground hideout Linus is using in his attempt to raise "the Great Pumpkin" to destroy the world.

Kite Eating Trees: A parody of the Kite-Eating Tree from the Peanuts franchise. These creatures are mobile, anthropomorphic and monstrous trees created as 'arboreal warfare devices' during the Fourth World War that often disguise themselves as real trees before attacking. Their favorite food is Canadians (who, for some reason, are referred to as "kites", a point that Weapon Brown claims he has never understood). The trees, lacking their favorite food (Canada and its people appear to have been completely wiped out by the time of A Peanut Scorned) are not picky about their food, though. They will apparently eat anything living. They also seem capable of surviving in the Pumpkin Patch; however, they lose the element of surprise within the patch because normal trees do not grow there, but Kite Eaters have green leaves, giving them the appearance of a living, healthy tree. They also possess a burning sap as a defensive mechanism. The only one seen in the comic was destroyed by Weapon Brown through the use of a shrapnel grenade thrown down its mouth.

The Syndicate: A shadowy organization referenced multiple times during A Peanut Scorned, The Syndicate is a nod to the United Feature Syndicate, the company that ran Peanuts in syndication in newspapers. In the comic, however, the Syndicate was depicted as evil, and was the source of a great deal of misery for various characters, including Weapon Brown himself as well as Linus. An emergency which afflicted a number of scientists working for the Syndicate prompted the events depicted in A Weapon Brown Christmas- they had contracted a neuromuscular disease that made those afflicted seem like they are dancing. This continues until either the victims' spines snap or they die, with the implication that both usually occurred at once to all victims of the disease. The disease was referred to as 'the Jigs' and was a nod to the dancing seen in A Charlie Brown Christmas. The disease could only occur in highly clean and sanitized conditions such as a Syndicate lab. In Blockhead's War, the Syndicate is a huge corporation-nation ruled by "Mr. Horns", the Pointy-Haired Boss from Dilbert and employing the characters from comic strips such as Beetle Bailey, Crock, Mary Worth and Doonesbury. Its goal in this longer story is to capture a self-sustaining food source known as the shmoo, held by Anne (Little Orphan Annie) and her followers underneath "Bone City" (B.C.).

== World ==
The world of the Weapon Brown character and the others who inhabit it with him is one that is post-apocalyptic. The world we know as the "modern" world ends, according to Weapon Brown, when "the Dolly Madison Corporation realizes that their artificial flavorings were a hair's breadth away from becoming lethal toxins" (this is a reference to Dolly Madison's snack cakes having the Peanuts characters on their labels for many years). At the same time period that this discovery is made, Hostess is not that far away from putting them out of business (and was itself liquidated and bought out by Apollo Global in the real world). According to Weapon Brown in an internal monologue, this caused them to shift from making snack cakes to making chemical weapons. They later developed the highly dangerous Zinger Bombs, which left half of the hemisphere uninhabitable. The result is that most currency in the world of Weapon Brown is not money, but technology, particularly food and, more importantly, functioning batteries (for retrieving Miss Buxley, Weapon Brown gets 100,000 calories and 50,000 volts). The Syndicate is the most prolific supplier of technology and owns a good portion of the American landmass.

== Books ==
- Yungbluth, Jason. Weapon Brown (Omnibus) (Death Ray Graphics, New York) 2014.
