= B.C.'s Quest for Tires =

1983 video game

- Developer: Sydney Development
- Publisher: Sierra On-Line
- Programmers: ColecoVision; Rick Banks; MaryLou O'Rourke; C64, Atari 8-bit; Chuck Benton; Apple II; Justin Gray; ZX Spectrum; Mike Davies
- Series: B.C.
- Platforms: Apple II; Atari 8-bit; ColecoVision; Commodore 64; IBM PC; MSX; ZX Spectrum
- Release: 1983: Atari 8-bit, ColecoVision; 1984: Apple, C64, IBM PC, Spectrum; 1985: MSX
- Genre: Action
- Mode: Single-player

B.C.'s Quest for Tires is a horizontally scrolling action video game published by Sierra On-Line for ColecoVision and Atari 8-bit computers in 1983. Versions were later released for the Commodore 64, IBM PC, ZX Spectrum, Apple II, and MSX. Based on the comic strip B.C. by Johnny Hart, BC's Quest for Tires is similar to Irem's Moon Patrol from the previous year. A wheel-riding caveman is always moving forward through horizontally scrolling levels, and the player jumps or ducks as obstacles approach. The game's title is a play on the contemporaneous film Quest for Fire.

Both B.C.'s Quest for Tires and Moon Patrol have key elements of the not-yet-invented endless runner genre, despite both games being divided into discrete levels.

A sequel, Grog's Revenge, was released in 1984.

== Plot ==
The player takes the role of the caveman Thor, who has to rescue his girlfriend, "Cute Chick", who has been kidnapped by a dinosaur. To do this, he must travel on his stone unicycle (actually an impossible wheel) through several levels. Each level has Thor moving from the left to the right, avoiding various dangers.

== Gameplay ==
Commodore 64 screenshot

B.C.'s Quest for Tires is an action game taking place on several consecutive levels. Each level consists of Thor having to jump over obstacles such as rocks or stalagmites and ducking under others, like tree branches or stalactites. In between each level is a brief challenge (a precursor to boss battles in later games). The first challenge has Thor jumping on turtles to cross a lake while trying to avoid being hit by the Fat Broad, another has Thor lining up with the Dookie Bird to catch a ride over a lava pit, another challenge has Thor trying to gain enough speed to jump another pit, and the final challenge has Thor jumping on turtles to cross another lake while trying to sneak past the dinosaur.

== Reception ==
Softline stated that, given the conventional gameplay ("it's that get-from-point-A-to-point-B kind of game"), the use of the familiar comic characters made "the player feel like finishing the game is worthwhile ... [Otherwise] it's just not the same". The magazine concluded that "B.C.'s Quest for Tires isn't so much a computer game as it is an interactive cartoon. This cartoon has its limits, but it does provide some challenge". Antic approved of the game not being another "'shoot the aliens and save the world' scenario", and the "first rate" animation, but predicted that most players would "enjoy the game for a day or two, then relegate it to the shelf". Compute! praised the game's "excellent graphics" and animation, which "approach cartoon standards". InfoWorld's Essential Guide to Atari Computers cited it as an entertaining arcade game. David Stone reviewed the game for Computer Gaming World, and stated that "QFT requires far more timing than strategy and, rather than levels of play, it offers new obstacles to overcome on the way to the rescue. Still, it is fun to play."

The game sold a million copies.

=== Awards ===
- Critic's Choice Awards: Best Game For Youngsters (awarded by Family Computing).
- Arkie Award: Most Humorous Video/Computer Game (awarded by Electronic Games).
- Colecovision Game of the Year (awarded by Video Game Update).
- Best use of Graphics and Sound in a Video Game (awarded by Billboard (magazine)).
- 1984 Golden Floppy Award for Excellence: Funniest Game of the Year, Video Games Category (Computer Games magazine).
- 1989 Software Publishers Association's best game award
