= B.C. (comic strip) =

American comic strip created by cartoonist Johnny Hart

- B.C. Logo
- Author(s): Johnny Hart (1958–2007); Mason Mastroianni (2007–2024)
- Website: Creators.com: B.C.
- Current status/schedule: Running
- Launch date: February 17, 1958
- Syndicate(s): (current) Creators Syndicate (1987–2024) (past) New York Herald Tribune Syndicate (1958–1966); Publishers Syndicate / Publishers-Hall Syndicate / Field Newspaper Syndicate / News America Syndicate / North America Syndicate (1967–1987)
- Genre(s): Gag-a-day, Humor

B.C. is a daily American comic strip created by cartoonist Johnny Hart. Set in prehistoric times, it features a group of cavemen and anthropomorphic animals from various geologic eras.

B.C. made its newspaper debut on February 17, 1958, and was among the longest-running strips still written and drawn by its original creator when Hart died at his drawing board in Nineveh, New York, on April 7, 2007. Since his death, Hart's grandson Mason Mastroianni has produced the strip, with B.C. syndicated by Creators Syndicate.

== Publication history ==
B.C. was initially rejected by a number of syndicates until the New York Herald Tribune Syndicate accepted it, launching the strip on February 17, 1958. Hart was assisted with B.C. by gag writers Jack Caprio and Dick Boland (who later joined Hart and cartoonist Brant Parker on The Wizard of Id).

When the Herald Tribune syndicate folded in 1966 due to the demise of its parent newspaper, B.C. was taken over by the Publishers Syndicate. That syndicate changed hands and names frequently — Publishers-Hall Syndicate, the Field Newspaper Syndicate, News America Syndicate, and finally North America Syndicate — eventually becoming part of King Features. At that point, in 1987, Hart changed distributors to Creators Syndicate, becoming one of Creators' first syndicated strips.

After Hart's death in 2007, the strip began being produced by Hart's grandsons Mason Mastroianni (head writer and cartoonist) and Mick Mastroianni (writer for both B.C. and Hart's other creation, Wizard of Id), and Hart's daughter Perri (letterer and colorist). (The Mastroianni brothers also created an original strip, Dogs of C-Kennel, in 2007.)

== Cast of characters ==
For a visual glossary, see Meet The Actors at John Hart Studios.

=== Character inspiration ===
Hart was inspired to draw cavemen (and many other creatures) through the chance suggestion of one of his coworkers at General Electric, and took to the idea "because they are a combination of simplicity and the origin of ideas". The name for the strip "may have been suggested by my wife, Bobby," Johnny recalls.

Hart describes the title character as similar to himself, playing the "patsy". The other major characters — Peter, Wiley, Clumsy Carp, Curls, and Thor — were patterned after friends and co-workers. The animal characters include dinosaurs, ants and an anteater, clams, a snake, a turtle and bird duo, and an apteryx (presented in the strip as being the sole surviving specimen, and hence self-aware of its being doomed to extinction).

=== Human characters ===
- B.C.: An orange haired, humble, naïve slob and eternal patsy. B.C. occasionally makes nighttime rounds as his alter-ego, "The Midnight Skulker."
- Peter: A yellow haired, self-styled genius and the world's first philosophical failure, founder of the "Prehistoric Pessimists Society" and the "Truth Pedestal," and the discoverer of oil. Peter is patterned after Hart's friend, Peter Reuter; the two had been co-workers at General Electric.
- Thor: A brown-haired, smart, witty self-proclaimed ladies' man; inventor of the wheel and the comb. Thor was patterned after another of Hart's friends from GE, Thornton Kinney.
- Jane: a bossy cavewoman who enjoys clobbering snakes. Until August 29, 2019, Jane was referred to in the strip as the "Fat Broad". She is named after Johnny's mother-in-law, Janie Indiana Finch.
- Grace: a quiet but intellectual giant in a world of crude men. Until August 29, 2019, Grace was referred to in the strip as the "Cute Chick". She is named after Johnny's mom Grace Anna Brown. Grace's birthday is March 1.
- Wiley: a peg-legged, superstitious, unshaven, woman-fearing, water-hating poet and coach of the local baseball and football teams, not to mention the first bartender. Wiley was patterned after Hart's brother-in-law, Wiley Baxter, who lost his leg in World War II.
- Clumsy Carp: a nerdy, bespectacled ichthyologist and perpetual klutz, clumsy enough to trip over a shadow, yet with some unusual skills, such as his ability to make and stack "water balls" (similar to snowballs). Clumsy Carp was patterned after Hart's childhood friend, Jack Caprio.
- Curls: a master of sarcastic wit. Curls was patterned after Hart's friend from high school, Richard (Curly) Boland.
- Grog: pure Id, a caveman's caveman; a primitive, semi-evolved wild man with enough strength to knock the sun out of the sky using a golfball. His vocabulary was very limited until a January 1977 strip in which, to Peter's shock, he actually spoke full sentences.
- The Guru: an unnamed, bearded wise man living like a hermit atop a mountain, whence he dispenses wisdom and sarcasm.

=== Animals and other non-human characters ===
- John the Turtle and the Dookie Bird: this prehistoric odd couple are inseparable friends, especially when making their annual trek south for the winter. The Dookie Bird rides on John's back when they travel.
- The Snake: the put-upon, mortal enemy of Jane (and her club).
- The Anteater: eats ants with a sticky, elastic tongue and a ZOT! sound. Hart actually drew something of a hybrid—with the long ears of an aardvark and the bushy tail of a giant anteater. (This character was the inspiration for Peter the Anteater, the University of California, Irvine team mascot. Also served as the inspiration for the mascot of the now disestablished US Navy fighter squadron VF-114 the "Aardvarks".)
- Maude: an ant, a nagging wife with a smart-alec son (Johnny) and a quarrelsome, straying husband.
- Jake: ant husband of Maude, who is always threatening to run off with Shirley.
- Queen Ida: the queen ant, an unfeeling and abusive dictator. Queen Ida was based on Hart's wife Bobby, whose given name was Ida. She was featured every year on her birthday, December 3, until Mrs. Hart's death in 2018. (The December 3, 2019 strip featured a parting message from the Queen to her subjects.)
- The Dinosaur: big but not too bright—a sort of sauropod with spinal plates like a stegosaurus. Sometimes called Gronk, which is the only sound he makes (although he can talk fluently in recent strips).
- The Clams: talking clams with legs, among other appendages. (Clams are also the preferred unit of currency in B.C.)
- The Apteryx (kiwi): a "wingless bird with hairy feathers", as he invariably introduces himself.
- The Turkey: makes his yearly appearance at Thanksgiving time, eluding the mighty hunters.
- Oynque: the turkey's porcine partner in crime, rarely seen without his trademark mud puddle.
- Wolf: the newest B.C. character August 24, 2009; a blissfully deviant domestication of Precambrian fur. Man's first friend.
- Various incidental ants, including a schoolteacher and her students.
- Raptors: velociraptors that try to eat the other characters.

There are also several odd inanimate characters, including a talking Daisy and its friend, a talking Rock.

=== Seldom-used or one-shot human characters ===
Although the strip seldom expands its human cast outside of the established group of characters, there are a few exceptions.

- Anno Domini, or A.D., introduced during a weeks-long journey by Peter to discover the new world, which he successfully accomplished. His name is arguably a riff on B.C.'s name. He dresses as a caveman very much like the rest of the characters, but has a thick mustache and a stereotypical Italian accent, assuming a bit of a take on Christopher Columbus. He befriends Peter in the "new world".
- Conahonty, a Native American Indian, who also appears in the "new world" storyline, and befriends Peter. He is a friend of A.D.'s, and speaks rather stereotypical broken English. He dresses more like a somewhat stereotyped Indian than a caveman, and at one point even specifically states that he is an American Indian. He and A.D. were not frequently seen after Peter returned from his epic journey. The two are the most oft-appearing non-regular human characters in the history of the strip other than the Guru, due to the strip's tight focus on its core cast of humans. His name is a spoof of the name Pocahontas.
- Peter's Pen Pal, An unseen person whom Peter corresponds with by tossing "floating stone tablet" letters into the ocean and receiving answers the next day.

== Setting ==
The characters live, for the most part, in caves, in what appears to be a barren, mountainous desert by an unidentified sea. Background detail is often limited to a simple horizon line broken up by the occasional silhouettes of a stray volcano or cloud. "Retail stores", "shop counters", and "businesses" are symbolized by a single boulder, labeled (for instance): "Wheel Repair", "Advice Column", "Psychiatrist", etc. The February 5, 2012, strip gives a nearby location of 53°24′17″N 6°12′3″W, which is in present-day Dublin, Ireland.

Originally, the strip was set firmly in prehistoric times, with the characters clearly living in an era untouched by modernity. Typical plot lines, for example, include B.C.'s friend, Thor (inventor of the wheel and the comb), trying to discover a use for the wheel. Thor was also seen making calendars out of stone every December. Other characters attempt to harness fire or to discover an unexplored territory, like Peter trying to find the "new world" by crossing the ocean on a raft. Animals, like the dinosaur, think such thoughts as, "There's one consolation to becoming extinct—I'll go down in history as the first one to go down in history." Grog arrived in early 1966, emerging from a miniature glacier which melted to reveal what Wiley called "Prehistoric man!"

B.C., like Hart's Wizard of Id, is a period burlesque with a deliberately broad, non literal time frame. As time went on, the strip began to mine humor from having the characters make explicit references to modern-day current events, inventions, and celebrities. Increasingly familiar visual devices, like the makeshift "telephone" built into a tree trunk, also started to blur the comic's supposed prehistoric setting and make it rife with intentional anachronisms. One of the comic's early out-of-context jokes, from June 22, 1967, was this one:

Peter: "I used to think the Sun revolved around the Earth."
B.C.: "What does it revolve around?"
Peter: "The United States!"

Another early example: Near Christmas time, the apteryx, dressed as Santa Claus, modified his usual spiel: "Hi there, I'm an Apterclaus, a wingless toymonger with batteries not included!" A devout Christian, Hart included didactic references to the death and resurrection of Jesus in Easter installments. The Washington Post columnist and comics critic Gene Weingarten suggested that B.C. is actually set not in the past but in a dystopic, post-apocalyptic future.

== Format and style ==
B.C. follows a gag-a-day format, featuring (mostly) unrelated jokes from day to day, plus a color Sunday strip. Occasionally it will run an extended sequence on a given theme over a week or two. It also follows the convention of Sunday strips with a short, setup/payoff joke in the first two panels, followed by an extended gag, which allows newspapers to trim the opening panels for space. The principal cast is small and varied, with each character imbued with a developed personality. "The art style, like that of Charles Schulz's Peanuts, masks sophisticated minimalism with a casually scratchy veneer," according to comics historian Don Markstein.

Dry humor, prose, verse, slapstick, irony, shameless puns and wordplay, and comedic devices such as Wiley's Dictionary (where common words are defined humorously with a twist, see Daffynition) make for some of the mix of material in B.C. Example: "Rock (verb): To cause something or someone to swing or sway, principally by hitting them with it!"—from an early 1967 strip. Or: "Cantaloupe (noun): What the father of the bride asks after seeing the wedding estimate!"

There are running gags relating to the main cast and to a variety of secondary, continuing characters. One such periodic recurring gag has Peter communicating with an unseen pen-pal on the other side of the ocean, writing a message on a slab of rock that he floats off into the horizon. It is invariably returned the same way, with a sarcastic reply written on the reverse side. These segments use silent or "pantomime" panels (indicating that time has elapsed; night falls and dawn rises) between the set-up and the delayed punch line—typical of Hart's idiosyncratic use of "timing" in B.C.

== Controversies ==
The B.C. daily strip from December 7, 2006, attracted criticism for defining infamy as "a word seldom used after Toyota sales topped 2 million." The day was the 65th anniversary of the Japanese military's attack on Pearl Harbor, and the punchline of the strip refers to Franklin D. Roosevelt's "Infamy Speech" which requested from Congress a declaration of war against Japan. The day's strip was pulled from at least one newspaper, the San Antonio Express-News. The paper's managing editor said the comic was "a regressive and insensitive statement about one of the worst days in American history."

On July 21, 2009, the strip presented a gag that involved the supposed suggestion of animal abuse. John Hart Studios received many angry responses from readers and issued an apology on their website.

=== Religious aspect ===
B.C. strip from April 15, 2001, which prompted complaints from some Jewish groups.

Late in the run of the strip, and following a renewal of Hart's religious faith in 1984, B.C. increasingly incorporated religious, social, and political commentary, continuing until Hart's death in 2007. References to Christianity, anachronistic given the strip's supposed setting and the implications of its title, became increasingly frequent during Hart's later years.

In interviews, Hart referred to his strip as a "ministry" intended to mix religious themes with secular humor. Though other strips such as The Family Circus and Peanuts have included Christian themes, B.C. strips were pulled from comics pages on several occasions due to editorial perception of religious favoritism or overt proselytizing. The Los Angeles Times refused to print the March 31, 1996 strip, in which Wiley writes a poem about the suffering of Christ, on the grounds that it "may be considered proselytizing and inappropriate for the comics pages." The newspaper reversed its decision after it was criticized by Pat Robertson in a segment on The 700 Club, printing the strip in the Religion section instead of the comics page, and continuing to do so for later strips with a religious message.

The American Jewish Committee termed the Easter 2001 strip, which depicted the last words of Jesus Christ and a menorah transforming into a cross, "religiously offensive" and "shameful", and accused Hart of promoting supersessionist theology.

The November 10, 2003 strip depicted a character using an outhouse with a crescent symbol on the front, slamming the door shut, and declaring, "Is it just me, or does it stink in here?" This was interpreted by some as carrying an anti-Islam message. Hart responded to the controversy, saying "This comic was in no way intended to be a message against Islam — subliminal or otherwise.... It would be contradictory to my own faith as a Christian to insult other people's beliefs."

== B.C. in other media ==
- The characters were featured in two animated television specials:
  - B.C.: The First Thanksgiving, first aired on NBC in 1973, was directed by Abe Levitow, and featured the voice talents of Daws Butler (as B.C. and Clumsy), Don Messick as Peter and Thor, Bob Holt as Wiley and Grog, and Joanie Sommers as Fat Broad and Cute Chick.
  - B.C.: A Special Christmas first aired on HBO in 1981, and starred the comedy team of Bob and Ray as the voices of Peter and Wiley, respectively.
- They have appeared in many commercials and public service announcements:
  - In the last half of the 1960s, they were in commercials for Marathon gasoline and featured on drinking glasses given away as a premium by Marathon filling stations.
  - In the early part of the 1970s they appeared in animated PSAs for the U.S. federal agency ACTION.
  - They appeared in commercials for Monroe Shocks in the early 1980s
  - They were licensed by Arby's restaurants in 1981, which also issued a collector set of drinking glasses.
- B.C. was turned into two video games for the ColecoVision console and Atari 8-bit computers, Commodore 64, and MSX home computers: B.C.'s Quest for Tires and B.C. 2: Grog's Revenge.

== Hometown ==
Influences from B.C. are found throughout Johnny Hart's home of Broome County, New York. A PGA Tour event, the B.C. Open, took place every summer in Endicott, New York, through 2005 (the final scheduled B.C. Open in 2006 was disrupted by flooding, prompting a change of venue to the Turning Stone Resort & Casino in central New York state). Each year Johnny would bring in a group of cartoonists to play in the Pro-Am. Jim Davis, Mike Peters, Mort Walker, Paul Szep, Dik Browne, John Cullen Murphy, Dean Young, Stan Drake, Brant Parker, Lynn Johnston, and entertainer Tom Smothers would put on a free show for the community, drawing and signing autographs for golf and cartooning fans.

The Broome County parks department features Gronk the dinosaur as their mascot, and Thor riding a wheel graces every Broome County Transit bus. In the past, Hart has also left his mark, free of charge, on the logos of the Broome Dusters and B.C. Icemen hockey teams.

== Awards ==
- 1967 Best Humor Strip in America, National Cartoonists Society
- 1968 The Reuben, Cartoonist of the Year, National Cartoonists Society
- 1970 Yellow Kid Award, Cartoonist of the Year, International Congress of Comics, Lucca, Italy
- 1971 Cartoonist of the Year, France
- 1972 NASA Public Service Award, for outstanding contributions to NASA
- 1973 Best Feature Animation Award, National Cartoonists Society, for B.C. The First Thanksgiving
- 1974:
  - The Golden Spike Award – Best Animated Television Commercial, International Society of Radio and Television Broadcasters, for B.C. 'A' We're the ACTION Corps
  - The Silver Bell Award, Best Animated Television Commercial, Advertising Council, for B.C. Tickets for ACTION
- 1976 "The Sam" Adamson Award, Best International Comic Strip Cartoonist, Swedish Academy of Comic Art
- 1981 The Elzie Seger Award, Outstanding Contributions to the Art of Cartooning, King Features
- 1982 The Golden Sheaf Award and "The Spontaneous Human Category Special Jury Award," The Yorkton Short Film and Video Festival, Canada, for B.C. A Special Christmas
- 1989 Best Newspaper Comic Strip, National Cartoonists Society

== Collections and reprints ==
(All titles are by Johnny Hart; published by Fawcett Gold Medal unless otherwise noted. )

- Hey! B.C. (1959) (also Funk & Wagnalls trade pb)
- Back to B.C. (1961) (also G. P. Putnam's Sons trade pb)
- B.C. Strikes Back (1962) (also G. P. Putnam's Sons trade pb)
- Hurray for B.C. (1963)
- The Sunday Best of B.C. (1964) G. P. Putnam's Sons
- What's New, B.C.? (1968)
- B.C. Big Wheel! (1969)
- B.C. Is Alive and Well (1969)
- Take a Bow, B.C. (1970)
- B.C. Life is a Seventy-Five Cent Paperback (1970) This book was retitled every time the price went up: 75¢, 95¢, $1.25, $1.75, and $1.95 in the U.S.; and 50p and 60p in Great Britain.
- B.C. on the Rocks (1971)
- B.C. Right On (1973)
- B.C. Cave In (1973)
- B.C. One More Time (1973)
- B.C. Dip in Road (1974)
- B.C. It's a Funny World (1974)
- B.C. Truckin on Down (1975)
- B.C. Great Zot I'm Beautiful (1977)
- B.C. Color Me Sunday (1977)
- B.C. The Second and Third Letters of the Alphabet Revisited (1977)
- B.C. Loneliness Is Rotting on a Bookrack (1978)
- B.C. Where the Hell Is Heck? (1978)
- B.C. The Sun Comes Up, the Sun Goes Down (1979)
- I, B.C. (1980)
- B.C. A Special Christmas (1981) Firefly Books
- B.C. No Two Sexes Are Alike (1981)
- B.C. A Clam for Your Thoughts (1981)
- B.C. But Theriously, Folkth... (1982)
- B.C. Star Light, Star Bright, First... (1982)
- B.C. Out One Ear and In the Other (1983)
- B.C. I Don't Wanta Hear About It (1984)
- B.C. Life Goes On (1984)
- B.C. A Rag and a Bone and a Yank of Hair (1985)
- B.C. Lover's Leap (1985)
- B.C. Why Me? (1986)
- Here Comes B.C. (1987) Budget Books
- B.C. Rides Again (1988) Andrews McMeel
- Return of B.C. Rides Again (1989) Andrews McMeel
- B.C. (1990) Andrews McMeel
- Johnny Hart's Growingold with B.C.: A 50 Year Celebration (2007) Checker Books
- I Did It His Way: A Collection of Classic B.C. Religious Comic Strips (2009) Thomas Nelson

On September 21, 2015, Go Comics began reprinting B.C. under the title "Back to B.C.".
