= Bring Me the Head of Charlie Brown =

1986 film by Jim Reardon

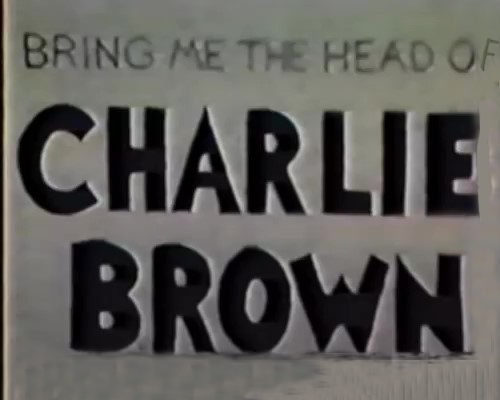
- Title card for the short
- Directed by: Jim Reardon
- Written by: Jim Reardon
- Based on: Peanuts by Charles M. Schulz
- Starring: Etienne Badillo; Rich Moore; Mike Reardon; William Hanna; William Holden; Bret Haaland; Nate Kanfer; Jeff Pidgeon
- Narrated by: Rich Moore
- Edited by: Jim Ryan
- Production company: California Institute of the Arts
- Distributed by: California Institute of the Arts
- Release date: June 27, 1986
- Running time: 3:20
- Country: United States
- Language: English

Bring Me the Head of Charlie Brown is a 1986 American animated short student film written, directed, and animated by Jim Reardon while he was a student at CalArts. Bring Me The Head of Charlie Brown is black-and-white and has a rough, unfinished, hand-drawn look.

== Plot ==
The short film is presented as a trailer for a faux parody of a Peanuts television special whilst playing its signature song "Linus and Lucy". A narrator describes the premise of the special: the Great Pumpkin has placed a bounty on Charlie Brown, prompting the Peanuts characters to try to kill Charlie Brown in various ways (Lucy turning a football into a bomb, Schroeder using his piano to crush him, Snoopy biting his arm off, the Kite-Eating Tree falling on him, and Linus strangling him with his blanket), until the narrator announces Charlie Brown, "has been pushed too far." Charlie Brown cuts his hair into a Mohawk, adopts a thick accent similar to Arnold Schwarzenegger, and loads several weapons. Charlie Brown and the Peanuts characters then engage in a gunfight and a montage of chaotic violence with other cartoon and pop-culture characters/figures including Popeye, Godzilla, Blondie and Dagwood, Rocky Balboa, Adolf Hitler (seen painting before being shot) and two Nazi soldiers, Mickey Mouse, and Richard Simmons. The film ends with Charlie Brown smoking in bed alongside the Little Red-Haired Girl after engaging in sex.

The film also includes several pop-culture and film references: Linus strangling Charlie Brown is a remake of Luca Brasi's death in The Godfather, Charlie Brown's Mohawk haircut is a reference to Travis Bickle in Taxi Driver, and Charlie Brown screaming "Bitch!" after Lucy shoots him in the arm is a shot-by-shot remake of William Holden's gunfight in The Wild Bunch. The title "Bring Me The Head of Charlie Brown" is a parodic reference to Sam Peckinpah's Bring Me the Head of Alfredo Garcia (to which the short is dedicated), and the end credit to Charles "Dutch" Schultz is a reference to Dutch Schultz.

== Production ==
The song "Charlie Brown" by The Coasters plays over the end credits, which end with a note from Jim Reardon:

The creator of this picture wishes to state that he does not in any way wish to tarnish or demean the beloved characters of Charles M. "Dutch" Schulz's comic strip, Peanuts. No malice or damage to their goodwill was intended. So please don't sue me, because it will drag through the courts for years, and I haven't got a lawyer – and besides, you've already got half the money in the world, and I haven't got any. OK?

== Cast and credits ==
- Charlie Brown – Etienne Badillo, Rich Moore, Mike Reardon, William Hanna, William Holden
- Linus van Pelt – Nate Kanfer
- Lucy van Pelt – Bret Haaland
- Great Pumpkin – Jeff Pidgeon
- Additional Voices – Ed Bell, Bruce Johnson, Mike Reardon, Bret Haaland
- Narration – Rich Moore
- Others – Ed Bell, Dale McBeath, Bob Winquist, Mike Giaimo, Craig Smith, Bret Haaland, Nate Kanfer, Doug Frankel, Mike Reardon, Rich Moore, Russ Edmonds, Hal Ambro, Dan Hansen, Jim Ryan, Tony Fucile, Jeff Pidgeon, Bob McCrea, Sarge Morton, Mom, Eileen, and Beverly
- Dedicated to Sam "The Man" Peckinpah
- "Peanuts Theme" – Vince Guaraldi
- "Charlie Brown" – The Coasters (wrongly credited as The Platters)
- A Jim Reardon Cartoon – Made at Cal Arts, U.S.A.

== See also ==
- Mickey Mouse in Vietnam
- Bambi Meets Godzilla
- Escalation
- Weapon Brown
