= Kevin Rechin =

American cartoonist

- Born: Washington, D.C.
- Education: Virginia Commonwealth University
- Occupation: Cartoonist
- Known for: Crock
- Relatives: Bill Rechin
- Awards: National Cartoonists Society Magazine Illustration Award, 1999

Kevin Rechin is a cartoonist who drew the syndicated Crock comic strip and also creates cartoon illustrations for major publications.

Born in Washington, D.C., Rechin grew up in the suburbs of Springfield, Virginia. After graduating from Virginia Commonwealth University in 1989, Rechin worked with small daily newspapers until he was hired as a staff artist at USA Today where he created cover illustrations, caricatures and informational graphics. He began as a freelancer in 1999, eventually contributing to Time, Forbes, The Wall Street Journal, the National Geographic and other leading publications. His clients have included Hasbro, Disney, DreamWorks and Fox Sports.

In 2009, he created a mural for a superhero-themed children's room featured on an episode of Extreme Makeover: Home Edition.

== Crock ==
His father, Bill Rechin, drew Crock for King Features Syndicate for decades. After his father's death in May 2011, Kevin took over the drawing of Crock with scripting by his brother-in-law, Bob Morgan.

Rechin works from his Falls Church, Virginia studio which he shares with cartoonist Nick Galifianakis (If You Loved Me, You’d Think This Was Cute), creator of the pit bull character Zuzu.

In May 2012, he announced his intention to stop drawing the strip, with the last one to appear on May 20 of that year, the day before the first anniversary of his father's death.

== Awards ==
He received the National Cartoonists Society Magazine Illustration Award for 1999, and was nominated for their Magazine and Book Illustration Award for 1997.
