= Brant Parker =

American cartoonist

- Born: Brant Julian Parker; August 26, 1920 Los Angeles, California, U.S.
- Died: April 15, 2007 (aged 86) Lynchburg, Virginia, United States
- Area: Cartoonist
- Notable works: The Wizard of Id; Crock; Goosemyer
- Awards: National Cartoonists Society Humor Comic Strip Award (1971, 1976, 1980, 1982, 1983); Inkpot Award (1984); Reuben Award (1984); Elzie Segar Award (1986)

Brant Julian Parker (August 26, 1920 – April 15, 2007) was an American cartoonist. He co-created and drew The Wizard of Id comic strip until passing the job on to his son, Jeff Parker, in 1997. Cartoonist Johnny Hart, his co-creator, continued writing the strip until his death on April 7, 2007. Parker himself died eight days later, on April 15.

== Life ==
Parker studied at the Otis Art Institute in Los Angeles, California. He worked for the Walt Disney Studio before and after World War II, taking time off to serve in the United States Navy. After leaving Disney in 1945, he moved to New York to work as a political cartoonist for the Binghamton Press.

== Collaborations ==
It was in New York that he met Johnny Hart in 1950; Parker was judging an art contest in which 18-year-old Hart was an entrant. The meeting was the beginning of a friendship that led to the two collaborating on The Wizard of Id in 1964. Parker teamed with Don Wilder on the political commentary strip, Goosemyer, which ran from 1981 to 1983. He collaborated with Bill Rechin and Wilder on the strips Out of Bounds and Crock. Early on, Parker left those strips to devote more time to The Wizard of Id.

== Awards ==
Parker received the National Cartoonists Society Humor Comic Strip Award for 1971, 1976, 1980, 1982 and 1983. He also received their Reuben Award for his work on the strip in 1984 and their Elzie Segar Award in 1986.
