= Dogs of C-Kennel =

American comic strip created by cartoonists Mick Mastroianni and Mason Mastroianni

- Author: Mick Mastroianni (2007–present)
- Illustrator: Mason Mastroianni (2007–present)
- Website: Dogs of C-Kennel
- Current status/schedule: Running
- Launch date: Oktober 1, 2007
- Syndicate(s): Creators Syndicate (2010–present)
- Genre(s): Humor, Gag-a-day

Dogs of C-Kennel is a daily newspaper gag-a-day comic strip created by American cartoonists Mick Mastroianni and Mason Mastroianni that began October 1, 2007. It was featured as a comic strip in development in February 2007.

Dogs of C-Kennel follows three dogs who must endure life in an animal shelter. Will, a street-wise pit bull, Kenny, a large, lovable half-wit husky, and Iggy, a Chihuahua hypochondriac.

== Overview ==
=== History ===
In 2004 while living in Orlando and volunteering at the SPCA, Mick created his own comic strip, Dogs of C-Kennel, based upon the lovable pooches he encountered. Upon moving back to NY, and with his grandfather Johnny Hart as his mentor, Mick rounded out his characters and ideas, and in February 2007, Creators began featuring Dogs of C-Kennel on their website as a comic strip in development. When Hart passed away and Mason returned home to take over his duties, Mick asked him to come on board as illustrator and help further develop the look of the dogs. On October 4, 2010, Dogs of C-Kennel was launched by Creators.

=== Setting ===
The dogs Will, Kenny and Iggy and the rest of the colorful cast of inmates tries to maintain their sanity in the west wing of a sprawling animal shelter. Life in lockdown can be cruel, harsh, and usually hilarious. The comic is set in present time. Online-based issues such as comments and doubtful content are a running gag, as well as reactions as the dogs watch TV, or how to break out from the kennel by different means of fireworks or via a tunneling project.

== Cast of characters ==
Will, Kenny and Iggy are the main cast on the C-Kennel.

=== Main characters ===
- Will: A streetwise pit bull with a dubious past, sarcastic and the alpha male of the C-Kennel.
- Kenny: A blissfully naive Siberian husky with lots of furry friendliness.
- Iggy: A Chihuahua four-legged hypochondriacal panic attack and chronically nervous.

=== Supporting characters ===
In addition to the main cast, several characters appears from time to time.

- Tucker: A technologically-inclined and culture-savvy Schnauzer-mix, best educated on the kennel.
- Cocoa A beagle and the only female dog, Kenny's love of his life.
- The Fleas: A couple of bachelors, often living in Kenny's fur.
- Wheeler A streetwise bird. Delivers items to the kennel.
- Oliver: A Great Danea-Akita mix, speaks the King's English, sees himself as ruler of all around him. Rarely seen.
