= Bill Rechin =

American cartoonist (1930–2011)

- Born: August 20, 1930 Buffalo, New York
- Died: May 21, 2011 (aged 80) Spotsylvania County, Virginia
- Area: cartoonist
- Notable works: Crock comic strip (1975–present); Out of Bounds comic strip (1986–present)
- Awards: National Cartoonists Society – Newspaper Panel Cartoon Award; 1992

William J. Rechin (August 20, 1930 – May 21, 2011), better known as Bill Rechin, was an American cartoonist who created the sports-themed comic strips Out of Bounds and the French Foreign Legion humor comic Crock.

Born in Buffalo, New York, Rechin studied art at Buffalo's Albright Academy of Art, where he met his wife, Trish. He drew his first strip, Pluribus, in 1971. In 1975, Rechin, Don Wilder (1934–2008) and Brant Parker launched Crock, a strip depicting the French Foreign Legion. Wilder and Rechin began their Out of Bounds strip in 1986.

Rechin lived in Spotsylvania County, Virginia with his wife. The couple had seven children and eight grandchildren. He died of esophageal cancer on May 21, 2011.

== Awards ==
He received the National Cartoonists Society's Newspaper Panel Cartoon Award for 1992 for his work on Out of Bounds. He was president of the NCS for part of 1988. His son, cartoon illustrator Kevin Rechin, received the National Cartoonist Society Magazine and Book Illustration for 1999, and was nominated for the same award for 1997. Kevin Rechin took over Crock in May 2011, with his brother-in-law, Bob Morgan, scripting.

== Sources ==
- Curran, Bill (February 15, 1990). "St. Joe's to Honor 'Crock' Creator". The Buffalo News. Buffalo, New York.
- Zitz, Michael (April 7, 1990). "Artist's imagination never runs dry". The Free Lance-Star. Fredericksburg, Virginia. p. 21.
- Sautter, Bill (September 23, 1990). "Life's a Crock". The Washington Post. Washington, D.C. Archived from the original on November 4, 2012 – via HighBeam Research.
- Bailey, Kate (January 27, 1994). "Cartoonists battle 'PC police'". Kentucky New Era. Hopkinsville, Kentucky. Associated Press. p. 6B.
- "Rechin recognized by cartoonist group". The Free Lance-Star. Fredericksburg, Virginia. Associated Press. May 18, 1994. p. B3.
- Dean, Mensah (August 26, 1996). "A 'Crock'eyed world for Va. cartoonists". The Washington Times. Washington, D.C. Archived from the original on 2012-11-04 – via HighBeam Research.
- Zitz, Michael (March 11, 2006). "Between a Crock & a Hard Place". The Free Lance-Star. Fredericksburg, Virginia. p. TC9.
- Markstein, Don. "Crock". Toonopedia.
