= B.C. II: Grog's Revenge =

1984 video game

- Developer: Sydney Development
- Publishers: Comptiq; Eaglesoft; Erbe Software; Sierra On-Line; Spectravideo; US Gold
- Designer: Rick Banks
- Series: B.C.
- Platforms: Commodore 64; Coleco Adam; ColecoVision; MSX
- Release: 1984: Adam, C64; 1985: ColecoVision, MSX
- Genre: Action
- Mode: Single-player

B.C. II: Grog's Revenge is an action video game by Sydney Development published in 1984 for the Coleco Adam and Commodore 64. Conversions followed for ColecoVision and MSX. Grog's Revenge is the sequel to B.C.'s Quest For Tires and is based on B.C., the newspaper comic strip by Johnny Hart. The game was advertised for the Atari 8-bit computers, ZX Spectrum, BBC Micro, and Amstrad CPC, but those ports were not released.

== Plot ==
Thor, a caveman, who rides a stone unicycle, is searching for the "meaning of life" within several mountains.

== Gameplay ==
The player must navigate Thor through the mountains, collecting clams. As in the comic strip, clams are used as money. The object of the game is to collect enough clams to pay a toll to another caveman, Peter, which will allow Thor to access the next mountain.

The player moves Thor along the mountainside and through caves. When on the mountainside, Thor can move in all four directions, but must avoid falling off the cliff, slamming into a wall, or hitting a rock or hole. When in a cave, the screen is dark except for a beam of light emanating from the player's position. Here, Thor may move from side to side, avoiding stalagmites.

There are two enemies that Thor must avoid: One is the 'Tiredactyl' which chases Thor upon sight, hoping to consume his tire (and costing him one life). The other is Grog; if he and Thor are on the same level, an alarm melody will play. If Grog catches up to or meets Thor, he will shout "GROG", launching Thor skyward and ending the game.

If the player collects enough clams before arriving at the end of the mountain trail, he proceeds to the next mountain; otherwise, he must go back and collect more clams.

== Ports ==
The Commodore 64 and Coleco Adam versions have 15 stages (5 per set). The MSX and ColecoVision versions only have 5 stages.

Due to a programming error, none of the MSX releases can be completed. The same goes for the ColecoVision version, although the bug was fixed for the Coleco Canada release. This bug was fixed by Félix Espina, a programmer from Spain in 2019.

== Reception ==
Zzap!64 gave the game a 91% rating in June 1985, describing it as a "stunningly impressive programme". Computer and Video Games rated the ColecoVision version 87% in 1989 and praised "hilarious graphical touches and jolly gameplay". It was depicted as "both addictive and highly amusing".

In a retrospective feature from 1994 on old video games, Commodore Format said Grog's Revenge was "definitely a game of the old school" but remained "a fun little diversion." They rated it 70%.
