= Broome County Transit =

Public transportation in Broome County, New York

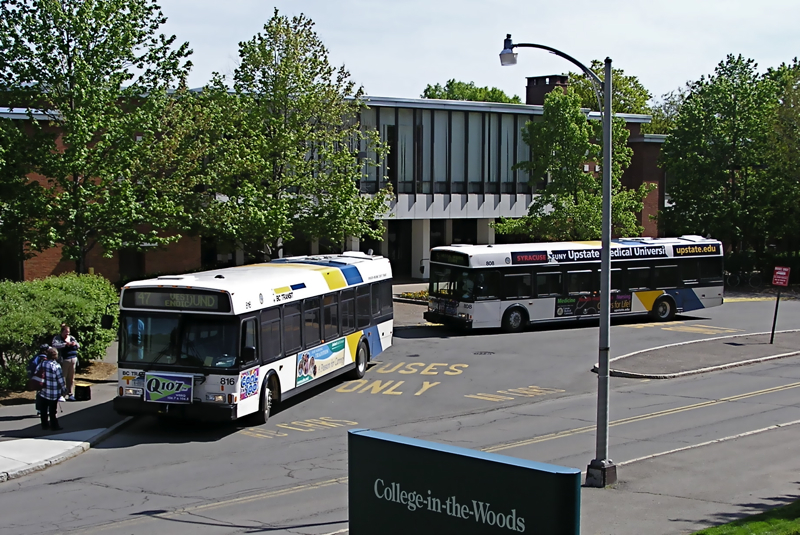
- BC Transit buses on the Binghamton University campus, May 2008.
- Headquarters: 413 Old Mill Road, Vestal
- Service area: Broome County, New York
- Service type: bus service, paratransit
- Routes: 21
- Stops: 900+
- Fuel type: Diesel, Diesel-electric hybrid Electric
- Website: ridebctransit.com

Broome County Transit, popularly branded as B.C. Transit, is the public transportation system serving Broome County, New York, which includes the city of Binghamton and surrounding communities.

== History ==
B.C. Transit was founded in 1968 when Broome County took over the assets of the private Triple Cities Traction Corporation, a takeover similar to those that took place in Rochester and Schenectady years prior. Unlike those city's transit systems, which became part of public benefit corporations, B.C. Transit is still owned and operated by the county (Department of Public Transportation) and is the largest such operator in Upstate New York (third largest overall in the state).

Logo for Broome Transit, 1968, by Swiss–Canadian designer Fritz Gottschalk

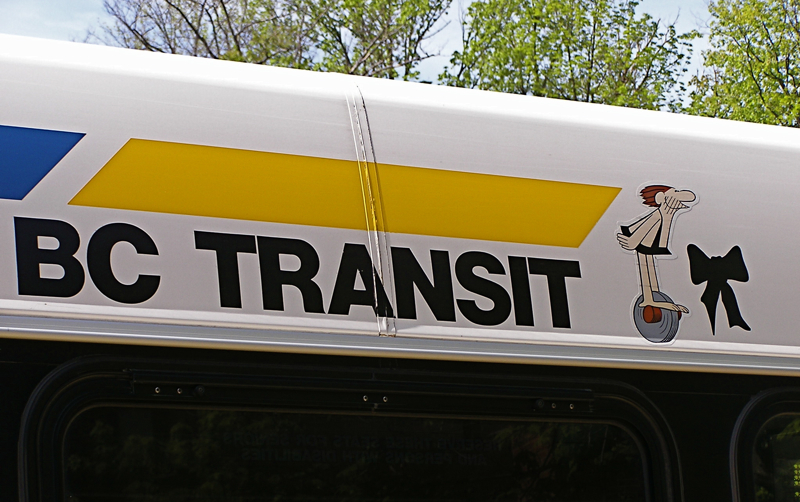
BC Transit logo on bus with black ribbon mourning the death of "B.C." cartoonist Johnny Hart.

Broome Transit originally used a logo designed by renowned Swiss–Canadian designer Fritz Gottschalk. At a later date, it rebranded as "B.C. Transit" and adopted the character Thor from the comic strip B.C., drawn by Endicott, New York native Johnny Hart. The "B.C." is also based (very) loosely on one of the logos from that comic strip as well.

At the time of B.C. Transit's formation, they inherited the token stock of Triple Cities Traction Corporation and that company's predecessor, the Binghamton Railway Company. These same tokens, some dating back to the turn of the 20th century, circulated until B.C. Transit phased out the token at the end of 2005 when they went to electronic fare collection.

== Routes and other services ==
=== City of Binghamton ===
- 3 Park Ave
- 5 Vestal Ave
- 7 Clinton St
- 8 Front St
- 12 Conklin Ave
- 15 Leroy St
- 16 Binghamton Univ Expresss
- 17 Johnson City
- 28 Robinson St
- 35 Endicott-Binghamton*
- 40 Chenango St
- 47 Vestal-Endicott
- 48 Oakdale Mall - Binghamton Univ
- 57 Shoppers Special
- 91 Shoppers Express

=== Rural ===
- 51 Kirkwood Commuter
- 53 Corporate Park

=== Country ===
- 401 Whitney Point
- 402 Windsor/ Harpursville
- 403 Port Crane
- 404 Conklin/ Kirkwood
- 405 Vestal
- 406 Chenango Forks

=== Combo Routes ===
- 12/3
- 40/8
- 28/40
- 12/28/40

=== Notes* ===
- 35 has many variations. Please see individual schedule for details.
- 401-406 These are B.C. Transit's microtransit routes (Dial-a-Bus On-Demand services) for residents outside of the greater Triple Cities Metropolitan Area, operating under the name B.C. Country, operating equipment similar to that of the paratransit fleet. These have a higher fare than the fixed routes, and must be booked 2-7 days in advance.

=== Paratransit ===
- B.C. Lift: Paratransit for the disabled who are physically unable to ride regular fixed routes buses, required by the Americans with Disabilities Act. This service only serves areas that are served by B.C. Transit fixed-route buses.
- OFA Mini-Bus: Paratransit for those 60+. This service only serves areas that are served by B.C. Transit fixed-route buses. Paid for by Broome County Office for Aging.

== Fares ==
Please Note: Routes 401-406, B.C. Lift, and OFA have different fare rates, which are also listed.

=== Fixed Routes ===
Standard Fare OW: $2.00

Transfer: FREE

5 Yrs or Younger: FREE (accompanied by an adult)

Unlimited Ride All Day Pass: $5.00 (Purchase onboard the bus)

12-Ride Card: $20.00 (Purchase at Weis ONLY)

7 Day Unlimited Pass: $25.00

11 2-Ride Cards: $40.00

22 1-Ride Cards: $40.00

31 Day Unlimited Pass: $70.00

=== Special Fares for Fixed Routes ===
Other Fares are for available for those with disabilities, elderly, students, or others who may qualify with proper identification.

REDUCED Fare OW: $1.00

31 Day Unlimited REDUCED: $44.00

31 Day Unlimited STUDENT: $44.00

=== Routes 401-406 ===
Standard Fare OW: $3.50

REDUCED Fare OW: $2.50

=== B.C. Lift ===
REDUCED Fare OW: $3.00

=== OFA MiniBus ===
REDUCED Fare OW: FREE

== Fleet ==
=== Current fleet ===
(All buses are Wheelchair-accessible)

Year	Manufacturer	Model	Fleet numbers	Engine	Transmission
2010	Freightliner	MB55	113	Cummins ISB6.7 EPA10	Allison
2010	Daimler Buses North America	Orion VII EPA10 HEV	601-603,605	Cummins ISB6.7 EPA10	BAE Systems Hybridrive
2014	Gillig	Low Floor 40'	701-707	Cummins ISL9 EPA14	Voith D864.5
2017	Gillig	Low Floor 40'	721-727	Cummins L9 EPA17	Voith D864.6
2018	Gillig	Low Floor 40'	741-747	Cummins L9 EPA17	Voith D864.6
2019	Gillig	Low Floor 40'	748	Cummins L9 EPA17	Voith D864.6
2019	Gillig	Low Floor HEV 40'	621-623	Cummins L9 EPA17	BAE Systems HDS 200
2019	Gillig	Low Floor 40'	761-765	Cummins L9 EPA17	Voith D864.6
2021	Gillig	Low Floor HEV 40'	641, 642	Cummins L9 EPA21	BAE Systems HDS 200
2021	Gillig	Low Floor 40'	781-783	Cummins L9 EPA21	Allson B3400xFE
2024	Gillig	Low Floor HEV 40'	661-664	Cummins L9 EPA24	BAE Systems HDS 200
2025	Gillig	Low Floor+ Electric 40'	901-906	…	BAE Systems ARENS control

=== Future fleet ===
BC Transit signed a contract to purchase 6 Novabus LFSe+ Battery Electric Buses, expected to be in service by 2024.

Pending the announcement of Novabus departing the US market, these plans have been altered, Gillig has been selected to provide the Low Floor Electric instead. These units are anticipated to enter service by autumn 2025

=== Past fleet ===
701-707 GMC TDH-3502 1968 064-080 801-814(I) GMC T6H-4521 1968 114-127 101-106 GMC T8W-603 1979 001-006 201-217 Grumman 40096-6-T 1982 CD094396-CD094412 601-617 Orion 01.508 1987 H6001587-H6001603 900-902 Orion 01.508 1992 N6003097-N6003099 501-515 Orion 05.501 1996 T6032639-T6032653 720 Orion 01.508 [1997] G6001400 Ex-NFTA 720 (built 1986) 729 Orion 01.508 [1997] G6001411 Ex-NFTA 729 (built 1986) 741 Orion 01.508 [1997] G6001426 Ex-NFTA 741 (built 1986) 757 Orion 01.508 [1997] G6001445 Ex-NFTA 757 (built 1986) 801-814(II) Orion 06.501 2000 Y6600213-Y6000237 815-823 Orion 06.501 2000 Y6600213-Y6000237 101-106 Orion 07.501 2009

== See also ==
- Washington Street and State Asylum Railroad
