= Video Game History Foundation =

Non-profit foundation

- Logo introduced in 2020
- Abbreviation: VGHF
- Formation: 2017; 9 years ago
- Founders: Frank Cifaldi
- Type: Operating community foundation (IRS exemption status): 501(c)(3)
- Purpose: Video game archival and preservation
- Headquarters: Oakland, California, U.S.
- Region served: Worldwide
- Method: Donations
- Key people: Director: Frank Cifaldi; Founding Board Members: Chris Melissinos; Simon Carless; Steve Lin; Mike Mika; Library Director: Phil Salvador
- Website: gamehistory.org

The Video Game History Foundation is a non-profit foundation founded by Frank Cifaldi. The primary aim of the foundation is the archival, preservation, and dissemination of historical media related to video games.

== History ==
In a talk given at the 2016 Game Developers Conference, Cifaldi expressed concern over the state of video game preservation. Noting that a significant amount of feature films produced before 1950 are now irrecoverably lost, Cifaldi found himself wondering if the early history of video games would ultimately suffer the same fate. In highlighting the disparity between modern film preservation and game preservation, Cifaldi lamented that the games industry was doing "a pretty terrible job of maintaining [its] legacy". He said that The Film Foundation, a non-profit organization dedicated to the preservation of film, was a major inspiration for the VGHF.

Prior to the founding of the VGHF, several members of its founding board had collaborated with and donated to the Library of Congress, the Smithsonian American Art Museum, the National Videogame Museum, and the Strong National Museum of Play.

The foundation launched in February 2017, an event which was marked by a collaborative livestream between the VGHF and video game news outlet IGN.

In January 2022, Phil Salvador joined the organization as Library Director to head numerous archival projects. In October 2023, Kelsey Lewin stepped down from the role of co-director, leaving the organization.

== Activities ==
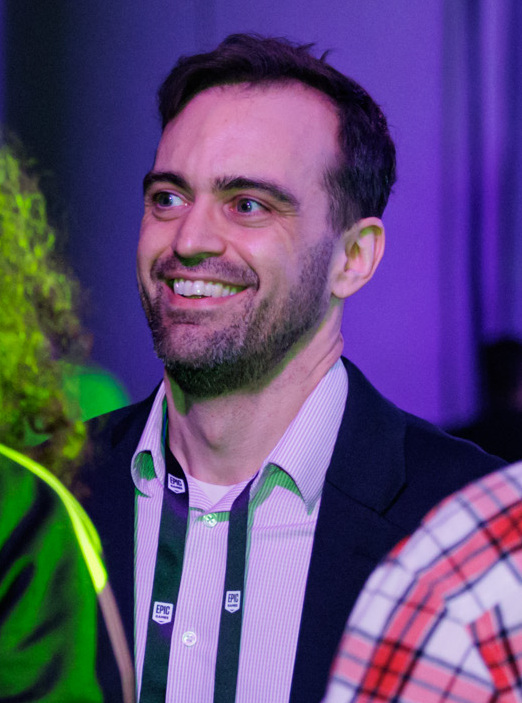
Founder Frank Cifaldi in 2023

Per the Video Game History Foundation's mission statement, the foundation's primary goal is to catalog, digitize (rip), and preserve the history of video games. The media preserved by the foundation covers a broad spectrum; in addition to video games, the foundation also archives source code, design documents, press kits, posters, video tapes, newspapers, and photographs. Particular attention is given to preserving the promotional ephemera produced during a game's release window, which may not necessarily be preserved as thoroughly as the games themselves. Cifaldi has characterized this ephemera as being immensely valuable to historians, commenting; "I think that the greatest discoveries we're going to find are on materials that people don't know are important."

The foundation seeks to aid and facilitate video game museums and archives by donating collected material after its preservation. Artifacts in the foundation's possession are often transitory, and are donated to a permanent home after their digitization and archival.

A "digital library" of the VGHF's began shortly after founding, a task which Cifaldi estimated would take several years given the size and scope of the project. As an intermediary solution, the foundation periodically selects assets from their "backend library" to upload and publish online. Early access to the digital library was made available to the public in January 2025. The Digital Library launched by VGHF contains over 30,000 files and index of gaming media, including but not limited to text archive, video game magazine media, and game development and production material. The VGHF also possesses unprocessed physical media, which will eventually be processed into digital media for wider access.

In August 2025, the VGHF announced its acquisition of the early video game newsletter Computer Entertainer, which they released under a Creative Commons Attribution license. The newsletter was notable for its coverage of video games in North America during the early to mid-1980s, including reviews and release dates.

The VGHF has also contracted with Wata Games which manages the evaluation and rating of sealed games for video game collectors prior to sale or auction. Wata has supplied the VGHF details of any prototype games that they have received for review to add to Foundation's database.

The Foundation launched its Video Game Source Project in October 2020, an effort to collect the original source code and other assets for classic video games which it will house in its archives and make available for researchers. The first two games added to this include The Secret of Monkey Island and Monkey Island 2: LeChuck's Revenge. They also included Power Up Baseball, an arcade game that had been in development by Midway in the 1990s in the style of NBA Jam but cancelled due to poor testing results. The Foundation also obtained the source code and IP rights to Xcavator, an unreleased NES game programmed by Chris Oberth, with plans to release a finished version of the game in 2026 to raise funds for their operation.

In July of 2023, the Foundation collaborated with the Software Preservation Network to conduct a study investigating the commercial availability of video games released in the US before 2010. The study concluded that only 13.27% of classic games were available through commercial means, while the remaining 87% were described as, "critically endangered." The study looked at games for several different consoles, including the Game Boy family of handhelds, of which only 5.8% of games were found to be available for digital purchase. The Foundation acknowledged that many games are preserved through various libraries and archives, but distribution of these games is often limited because of copyright laws. In July of 2026, the Foundation released footage showcased at E3 never publicly seen, dating all the way back from the first year.

The Foundation has also collaborated with the Software Preservation Network on a petition calling for an exemption to section 1201 of the DMCA. The exemption would have allowed libraries and archives to remotely share access to digital copies of the out-of-print games in their collections. Work on the petition began in 2021 and it reached the US Copyright Office in October of 2024, where the proposed exemption was denied.
