= Mallard Fillmore =

Right-wing American comic strip

- Title panel for Mallard Fillmore Sunday strips
- Author: Bruce Tinsley; Loren Fishman
- Current status/schedule: Running
- Launch date: June 6, 1994; 32 years ago
- Syndicate(s): King Features Syndicate
- Genre: Political

Mallard Fillmore is a comic strip written and illustrated by Bruce Tinsley until 2019 and Loren Fishman since 2020. It has been syndicated by King Features Syndicate since June 6, 1994. The strip follows the exploits of its title character, an anthropomorphic green-plumaged duck who works as a politically conservative reporter at fictional television station WFDR in Washington, D.C. Mallard's name is a pun on the name of the 13th president of the United States, Millard Fillmore.

== History ==
In 1991, Bruce Tinsley, who was an editorial cartoonist for the Charlottesville, Virginia paper The Daily Progress, was asked to create a cartoon character as a mascot for the newspaper's entertainment page. A duck, which Bruce named "Mallard Fillmore," was accepted, and made his debut in the paper.

Tinsley started sending samples of Mallard Fillmore, then known as The Fillmore File, to newspapers across the country and was eventually picked up by The Washington Times, which began running it in 1992. The strip was later picked up for national syndication by King Features Syndicate, which began distributing it in May 1994.

After November 23, 2019, Mallard Fillmore stopped updating with new content and instead reprinted old comics. Since March 9, 2020, new comics of Mallard Fillmore have been produced under the signature of a different artist, Fishman.

== Characters ==
Mallard getting hired for being an "Amphibious American"

Mallard Fillmore is the main character in the comic strip. He is a seasoned conservative reporter for fictional television station WFDR-TV in Washington, D.C., which hired him in order to fill its quota for "Amphibious Americans."

Although Mallard is a mallard duck, he is only occasionally shown with a mallard's coloring. Even when the daily strip is printed in color, Mallard generally appears as solid black. He does not exhibit any ducklike behavior, and the other characters (who are all human) never comment on his species, except in the strip setting up the premise.

Mallard yearns for the "good old days," and views himself as a victimized underdog in a world that is being overrun with political correctness, religious secularism, and hypocrisy. He is often in a state of outrage over the news item of the day, usually involving liberals.

Mallard's politics are very close to, if not one and the same as, cartoonist Bruce Tinsley's; Tinsley told the Pittsburgh Tribune-Review that "Mallard really is about as close to me as you can get," in an October 2005 interview.

Although WFDR appears to be a small, local channel, Mallard is still capable of interviewing famous politicians such as Al Gore. Occasionally, he will mention a study done by the "Fillmore Foundation," a think tank which may or may not actually exist in the comic strip, which he presumably heads. Mallard seems to be conscious of the fact that he is a fictional cartoon character, and is capable of "feeling poorly drawn." Mallard is also a bachelor, though in 2002 he had a date with a human woman he met in line at the post office. The date did not go well because he did not agree with her politics. He appears to be quite fond of Ann Coulter. Mallard did not attend journalism school, a fact repeatedly commented on in the comic, usually as an explanation as to why Mallard does not understand something about the WFDR news priorities.

Other characters from the strip:

- Mr. Noseworthy is Mallard's boss at WFDR. He is a parody of political correctness in America, afraid of offending anyone or anything. He is also a parody of the mainstream media, which is portrayed in the strip as having a liberal bias. Noseworthy's catchphrase is, "If you'd gone to journalism school, you'd know this stuff." He has a daughter in college who "came out" as a conservative.
- Chet is a co-worker of Mallard's at WFDR. He is an arrogant, vain, superficial, Botox-injecting, clothes-obsessed Caucasian male. In a series of strips in late 2003, he discovered he is a "metrosexual."
- Chantel, an African-American woman reporter, is a co-worker of Mallard's at WFDR. She is described as "smart, aggressive, and liberal." Unlike most liberals depicted in Mallard Fillmore, she is presented as an intelligent, competent person. She is usually used whenever a scene calls for a minority or a minority perspective – although she is offended when her colleagues assume she speaks on behalf of all African-Americans. On average, she appears about once or twice a year.
- Dave Quat, a conservative Vietnamese man, is Mallard's best friend, who generally agrees with Mallard's politics. He is the owner of his own diner, aptly named "Dave's Diner." His wife has never been seen.
- Rush Quat is Dave's young son. Rush is in the fourth grade and hopes to someday become a professional basketball player; he sometimes plays basketball with Mallard. Unlike most of the kids in his class, he does not take Ritalin.
- Eddie is Mallard's pet fish. Unlike Mallard, he does not speak but only comments in thought balloons.
- Congressman Pinkford Veneer is a fictional Washington, D.C. Democratic Congressman. He is a spineless, hypocritical, out-of-touch politician who enjoys tax hikes and opposes school vouchers, even though he sends his own children to a private school. In April 2000, he authored a bill that would require criminals to "give their victims a 30-second waiting period to unlock their trigger-locks" on their guns.
- Bruce Tinsley, the cartoonist, sometimes appears in the comic strip, represented by a giant hand holding a pencil over the scene. The other characters are capable of interacting with him, and presumably are aware that they are fictional comic strip characters. "Bruce Tinsley" usually comments on how things are depicted in an editorial cartoon. For example, a series of strips from June 1999 deals with Mr. Noseworthy arguing with "Bruce Tinsley" over how the cartoonist should depict a mugger.
- OSHA-Boy is a guardian of workplace safety and safe working conditions who is authorized to "annoy virtually anyone suspected of violating a regulation." He appears to be a flying, glasses-wearing dwarf (or other creature) with a superhero-like costume, and a clipboard in hand. He appears to be a physical manifestation of OSHA.
- Dr. Dilton Twinkley, an education expert, often appears as a guest on WFDR to talk about education issues. He appears to be an exaggerated parody of the NEA and U.S. public school system officials.
- Larry, a co-worker of Mallard's who gets agitated whenever Mallard does not purchase candy from his son for his school's annual fundraisers.
- Mr. or Ms. P.C. Person, a superhero-like physical manifestation of political correctness who prides hirself on being gender-neutral. (This character has come under fire from transgender rights groups because they felt the character promoted bigotry and mockery of transgender individuals.)
- Eddie Fillmore, Mallard's unseen father, a World War II veteran. According to Mallard, he spent three years in the Navy aboard the San Jacinto.

== Recurring themes ==
The strip often incorporates footnotes, which Tinsley has said was a response to readers and editors frequently accusing him of fabricating news items addressed in the strip.

- The Liberal Lexicon – Satiric definitions of liberal "buzzwords" or phrases.
- Liberals, the Early Years – Liberal stereotypes during the Stone Age.
- Mallard's Gift Ideas
- Mallard Hits Women('s Issues)
- Mallentines – poetry facially related to Valentine's Day
- A Mallard Issue Brief
- Mallard Mating Rituals
- Mallard's New Year's Predictions/Resolutions
- Puerto Ricans
- Mallard's Back-to-School Predictions/Facts
- Belgian Art and Food
- Minority Hair
- Islamic fundamentalism
- The Taste of Coins – Mallard licks a piece of currency and comments on the flavor
- Dear Mallard – Mallard responds to reader mail.

== Controversies ==
=== Parody in America (The Book) ===
In the 2004 book America (The Book), written by the staff of The Daily Show, a parody of Mallard Fillmore appears in a section about political cartoons (which also included parodies of Peanuts and Doonesbury strips). In the parody, Mallard criticizes legislation protecting the environment, as well as the income tax, and concludes "Ooops! I forgot to tell a joke!"

In the strip's 5–8 July 2005 editions, Tinsley responded to the America (The Book) parody, claiming that Jon Stewart "tried to deceive people into thinking it was a real [Mallard Fillmore strip]" by using the comic's name and a fictitious date.

The 2006 paperback "Teacher's Edition" of America (The Book) further addresses this controversy. On the page with the Mallard strip, Stanley K. Shultz, a college professor hired to correct factual inaccuracies in the book, remarked that "This does not appear to be an authentic 'Fillmore' cartoon, although the authors of this book have captured accurately the strip's level of humor."

The Daily Show staff worked in another jab at the comic strip in Earth (The Book), where the strip Love Is... is referred to as "a creepy cartoon that makes Mallard Fillmore look funny."

=== Antisemitism ===
On January 4, 2005, a Mallard Fillmore strip was published featuring a television executive whom bloggers accused of being a Jewish caricature that promoted the anti-Semitic stereotype that "Hollywood is run by Jews." While the main "Mallard" page only shows a week's worth of cartoons at a time, this cartoon is available on Jewish World Review's web site.

The strip's caricature of Jon Stewart, with a long, downwardly pointed nose, was criticized by Stewart's colleague satirist Stephen Colbert, who, during a December 14, 2006 show, joked that the caricature may have been "clip art from The Protocols of the Elders of Zion." Tinsley has since stated about Stewart that "honestly, I didn't even know he was Jewish."

In August 2019, The San Diego Union-Tribune announced it would be dropping Mallard Fillmore over antisemitism, concerning the August 12, 2019 edition of the strip featuring Ilhan Omar as a hate speech.

=== Depictions of the murder of Marcelo Lucero ===
Tinsley found himself in trouble again in 2009 when he printed a strip mocking the idea of hate crimes right after the one-year anniversary of the violent murder of Ecuadorian immigrant Marcelo Lucero, which was ruled a hate crime. This event sparked a protest where picketers gathered at the office of Newsday, the Long Island-based paper that had run the strip in question. The protesters felt that the strip was in poor taste and disrespected the memory of the murder victim. Newsday later issued a statement, saying:

We expect the cartoons we publish, many of which are nationally syndicated, to amuse, stir and entertain, but never to offend. Hate crime is a serious issue. This nationally syndicated cartoon should never have run and we have expressed our concern to the syndicator.

Tinsley himself wrote to Newsday, causing further conflict when he defended his work:

I take your newspaper's concern seriously, and your readers' perceptions even more seriously. But at the same time, as a cartoonist and former reporter, I don't steer away from controversy.

Newsday still runs Mallard Fillmore in its publication; following the New York Post move to discontinue its comics section it is the only paper in the New York City metropolitan area to carry it.

=== Tax burden overstated ===
In 2004 Nobel laureate economist Paul Krugman cited Mallard Fillmore as an example of misinformation. A strip showed a taxpayer attacking his TV set with a baseball bat and yelling: "I can't afford to send my kids to college, or even take 'em out of their substandard public school, because the federal, state and local governments take more than 50 percent of my income in taxes. And then the guy on the news asks with a straight face whether or not we can 'afford' tax cuts."

Krugman stated, "Very few Americans pay as much as 50 percent of their income in taxes; on average, families near the middle of the income distribution pay only about half that percentage in federal, state and local taxes combined."

=== Transphobia ===
In March 2021, all Gannett-owned newspapers which ran Mallard Fillmore dropped the strip over transphobia concerns relating to the February 19–20, 2021 strips which depicted trans women in women's sports in a negative light.

== Book collections ==
Title	Publication Date	ISBN
Mallard Fillmore	October 1, 1995	ISBN 0-8362-0778-5
Mallard Fillmore. ... on the Stump	May 1, 1996	ISBN 0-8362-1311-4
