= Crock (comic strip) =

American comic strip created by Bill Rechin and Brant Parker

- Author(s): Brant Parker (1975–1976); Don Wilder (1976–2008); Bill Rechin (2008–2011); Bob Morgan (2010–2012)
- Illustrator(s): Bill Rechin (1975–2010); Kevin Rechin (2011–2012)
- Website: Official website
- Current status/schedule: Concluded, in reruns
- Launch date: October 26, 1975
- End date: May 20, 2012
- Syndicate(s): King Features Syndicate
- Genre: Humor

Crock is an American comic strip created by Bill Rechin and Brant Parker depicting the French Foreign Legion. Distributed by King Features Syndicate, the strip began in 1975 and ended in May 2012. As of January 2012, it appeared in 250 newspapers in 14 countries.

Don Wilder took over the writing duties in 1976 as Parker returned his focus to The Wizard of Id. After Wilder's death in 2008, Bill Rechin also wrote the strip. When Bill Rechin was stricken with esophageal cancer in 2010, his son Kevin Rechin began to assist him with drawing it and his son-in-law Bob Morgan became the writer. On Bill Rechin's death, Kevin Rechin and Morgan continued the strip until publication of new Crock strips ended with the May 20, 2012, Sunday comic. Reprints of older strips by Bill Rechin have continued to run.

== Characters and story ==
King Features describes Crock as "the greatest and longest-running parody of the Foreign Legion classic, Beau Geste," written in 1924 by P. C. Wren and filmed several times. The comic strip is set in the middle of a barren desert at a desolate fort, where the tyrannical and corrupt Commandant Vermin P. Crock rules over a curious group of beleaguered legionnaires. The characters include:

- the cowardly Captain Poulet (French for chicken),
- Figowitz (who just wants a kind word),
- the simple-minded Maggot who digs and digs,
- Le Cesspool owner Grossie (Le Cesspool is a favorite though dilapidated hangout for the characters) who is married to Maggot,
- Grossie and Maggot’s son Otis,
- the narcissistic Preppie,
- Mario the Bartender,
- Jules Schmesse who is always about to be executed,
- the Arab horde and their stone god Nebookanezzer, who resembles a moai,
- the ancient sage, never seen, who lives in a cave and dispenses wisdom and sarcasm,
- the men of Outpost 5,
- the Bookmobile,
- the men being punished in the heat boxes,
- Quench the ever-dry camel,
- the Lost Patrol who have been wandering the desert for 20 years, trying to find their way back to the fort.

== TV appearance ==
A live action Crock sketch was included in the special Mother's Day Sunday Funnies broadcast May 8, 1983, on NBC.

== Theme park ==
Crock is featured in the Universal Studios Florida theme park Islands of Adventure, where Crock's fort is part of Toon Extra in Toon Lagoon.
