= Mason Mastroianni =

American cartoonist

Mason Mastroianni is an American comic artist and the grandson of Johnny Hart, creator of the comic strips B.C. and Wizard of Id.

Mastroianni took over artist's duties on B.C. after Hart's death in 2007. "B.C. by Mastroianni and Hart", the new byline, appeared for the very first time on January 3, 2010, in newspapers.

Together with his brother, Mick, he created an original strip, Dogs of C-Kennel, in 2007. It is syndicated by Creators Syndicate since 2010.

Beginning December 14, 2015, he is also the cartoonist for Wizard of Id.

In 2024, Mason became co-owner of an Anytime Fitness gym in Binghamton, NY that was closing, and rebranded it as BC Fit. The gym features his cartoons over the walls.
