= Bruce Tinsley =

American cartoonist (born 1958)

Edward Bruce Tinsley IV (born September 2, 1958) is an American cartoonist best known for his satirical conservative comic strip Mallard Fillmore (1994–).

== Early life and education ==
Tinsley was born in Louisville, Kentucky. He is a graduate of Bellarmine University with a degree in political science. While in high school, he won a cartoon contest sponsored by Louisville's Voice newspaper chain, and began working as an editorial cartoonist at age 16. He attended the University of Missouri in Columbia, Missouri, studying journalism, and then worked for The Daily Progress as an editorial cartoonist.

== Career ==
Jay Kennedy, a comics editor working for King Features, saw Mallard Fillmore in The Washington Times and contacted Tinsley, as Kennedy had been looking for the conservative response to Doonesbury. While developing Mallard Fillmore for potential syndication under Kennedy's direction, Tinsley won a Reader's Digest Fellowship to Indiana University School of Journalism, and attended graduate school at Indiana University Bloomington. Mallard Fillmore launched in 1994 and is still published today. Two collections were released early in the series' run, Mallard Fillmore and Mallard Fillmore On the Stump. Tinsley quietly stopped producing new strips in 2019. Since 2020, Mallard Fillmore comics are produced by Loren Fishman.

In 2006, Tinsley was arrested twice for driving while intoxicated, once in August and again in December, both Class A misdemeanors. After the December incident, he attacked the sentencing judge, Roderick McGillivray, in several of his comics.
