= Frank Cifaldi =

Video game historian (born 1982)

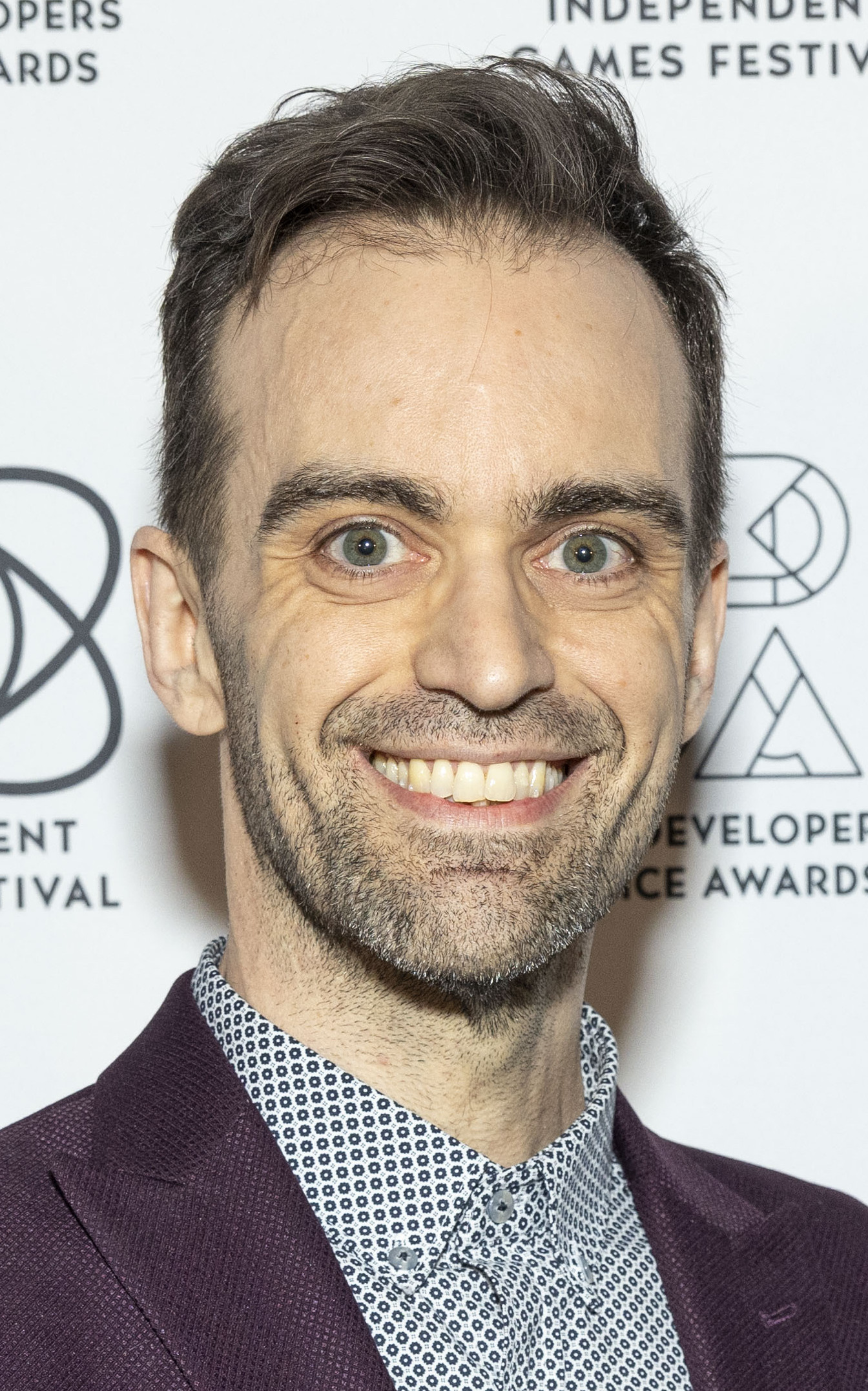
- Cifaldi at the 2024 Game Developers Conference
- Born: May 22, 1982 (age 44); Las Vegas, Nevada, U.S.
- Occupations: Video game archivist, historian, and developer
- Known for: Founding the Video Game History Foundation

Frank Cifaldi (born May 22, 1982) is a video game preservationist, historian, and developer. Cifaldi initially developed a website titled Lost Levels dedicated to unreleased video games. This led to writing for print and web sources such as Nintendo Official Magazine UK and Gamasutra.

In the early 2010s, Cifaldi pivoted his career from journalism to game development, working at Other Ocean and producing work on compilation titles such as the Mega Man Legacy Collection (2015) and The Disney Afternoon Collection (2017) for Digital Eclipse. He founded the Video Game History Foundation in 2017 and left Digital Eclipse around 2020 to focus on the foundation full time.

== Biography ==
=== Early life and journalist ===
Frank Cifaldi was born in Las Vegas, Nevada on May 22, 1982. Cifaldi lived in Las Vegas until he was an adult and attended community college briefly before starting a career in video games.

In 2003, Cifaldi founded Lost Levels, a website that collected information about unreleased video games. His first published writing was in Nintendo Official Magazine UK and would later write for gaming publications such as Gamasutra and GameTap. Cifaldi reflected that at that time, he was trying to "redefine how people talk about video games", covering obscure and unusual material. He was also a former host of the Retronauts podcast.

=== 2010s and beyond ===
Cifaldi said that around 2013 he found that online video game journalism did not have a future for him. Feeling confident he understood video game development, he connected with people in the video game industry such as his friend Mike Mika specifically, who was the studio director of Other Ocean. He began doing work he described as tasks that "no one feels like doing", such as making writing the internal newsletter and other internal work. He worked for the company for five years, where he described his position as evolving into a "designer slash producer" role, and spearheading the launch of a game label within the company called Digital Eclipse, working on projects like the Mega Man Legacy Collection (2015) and The Disney Afternoon Collection (2017). Cifaldi described the Mega Man Legacy Collection as "his baby", and began stepping away from the company after he began work on the Video Game History Foundation which he founded in 2017. As of 2018, he was the director of the organization, Cifaldi would leave Digital Eclipse around 2020 to work on the Video Game History Foundation full time.

He is also known for his extensive personal collection of video game periodicals. Cifaldi has also researched early video game advertising, early Nintendo prototypes, and the official Super Mario Bros. release date. He presented on games preservation at the 2016 Game Developers Conference.

== Select works ==
Year	Game title	Role
2015	Mega Man Legacy Collection	Producer, designer, head of restoration
2017	The Disney Afternoon Collection	Head of restoration
2018	Street Fighter 30th Anniversary Collection	Historian
2018	SNK 40th Anniversary Collection	Creative director
2023	The Making of Karateka	Additional Creative
