= The Wizard of Id =

American comic strip

- Cover of The Wizard of Id: The Dailies & Sundays, 1971 (collection).
- Author(s): Johnny Hart (1964–2007); Brant Parker (1964–1997); Mason Mastroianni (2007–present)
- Illustrator(s): Brant Parker (1964–1997); Jeff Parker (1997–2015); Mason Mastroianni (2015–present)
- Website: The Wizard of Id
- Current status/schedule: Running
- Launch date: November 9, 1964
- Syndicate(s): Publishers Newspaper Syndicate/North America Syndicate (1964–1989) Creators Syndicate (1989–present)
- Genre(s): Humor, Gag-a-day

The Wizard of Id is a daily newspaper comic strip created by American cartoonists Brant Parker and Johnny Hart. Beginning November 9, 1964, the strip follows the antics of a large cast of characters in a shabby medieval kingdom called "Id". The title is a play on The Wizard of Oz, combined with the Freudian psychological term id, which represents the instinctive and primal part of the human psyche.

In 1997, Brant Parker passed his illustrator's duties on to his son, Jeff Parker, who had already been involved with creating Id for a decade. In 2002, the strip appeared in some 1,000 newspapers all over the world, syndicated by Creators Syndicate. Hart's grandson Mason Mastroianni took over writing duties on the strip after Hart's death in 2007. The new byline, "B.C. by Mastroianni and Hart", appeared for the first time in another of their strips on January 3, 2010. On December 14, 2015, Jeff Parker also passed his duties on to Mastroianni.

== Overview ==
=== History ===
In the early 1960s, Johnny Hart, having already created the successful B.C., began collaborating with his friend, then-unpublished cartoonist Brant Parker, on a new comic strip. (Parker would later create or co-create the strips Goosemyer, Crock and Out of Bounds.) Having already drawn cartoons about the Stone Age, Hart advanced through time to the Middle Ages, taking the idea from a deck of playing cards. The Wizard of Id was first syndicated on November 9, 1964, drawn by Parker and co-written by Parker and Hart.

On November 17, 2014, the strip formally celebrated its 50th anniversary, and a number of other strips, including Beetle Bailey, BC, Ballard Street, Dennis the Menace, Garfield, Mother Goose and Grimm, Pickles, Mutts, Pooch Café, The Brilliant Mind of Edison Lee, and Barney Google and Snuffy Smith ran special 50th anniversary commemorative strips (e.g., Beetle called Sarge "a fink," and ended up sharing a dungeon cell with Spookingdorf). Hi and Lois ran an otherwise-ordinary strip with a portrait of the Wizard in the last panel, while Speed Bump ran a cartoon of Harry Potter in a Wizard of Id T-shirt, Family Circus put a greeting on a book (being held upside down), and Blondie showed a greeting written on a cake in the first panel.

=== Setting ===
The Wizard of Id deals with the goings-on of the rundown and oppressed mythical kingdom of Id. It follows people from all corners of the kingdom, but concentrates on the court of a tyrannical, dwarfish monarch known only as "the King". The strip's humor occasionally satirizes modern American culture, and deliberate anachronisms are rampant. Technology changes to suit whatever a gag requires; a battle with spears and arrows might be followed by a peasant using an ATM.

In some strips, the king is elected to his monarchial position (albeit through rigged ballots). The aspects that stay the same, however, are that Id is in the middle of nowhere, home to a large castle surrounded by a moat. The king and his subjects run an inept army perpetually at war with "the Huns", while the unhappy, overtaxed peasants (or "Idiots") make little money as farmers and stablehands to keep modest lifestyles.

=== Format ===
The Wizard of Id follows a gag-a-day format, plus a color Sunday page. There are running gags relating to the main cast, to a variety of secondary, continuing characters, and to the kingdom itself. Occasionally it will run an extended sequence on a given theme over a week or two.

=== Style ===
According to Don Markstein's Toonopedia, "The strip's humor style—quite contemporary, in contrast to its medieval setting—ranges from broad and low to pure black".

The style in which certain characters are drawn has changed from the early years of the strip to today. For example, the old style of the King's head was more rectangular, he had a crown with identifiable card suits on it (club, diamond, heart), his mustache and beard always hid his mouth, and his beard frequently extended to a curved point when the King was shown in profile (see The Wondrous Wizard of Id, 1970, Fawcett Publications). In the new style, the King's head is more trapezoidal with a slightly smaller and undecorated crown, he has a huge nose (even bigger than Rodney's) which covers his mouth and chin, and when he opens his mouth it appears that his beard has been shaved off. Like Sir Rodney and other large-nosed characters in the comic, he often "breaks the fourth wall" and stares directly at the audience in the final frame of the strip to indicate disgust or embarrassment when the punchline is spoken, accentuating the huge bulbous shape of his nose.

On December 14, 2015, Mason Mastroianni took over the strip from Jeff Parker.

== Cast of characters ==
A Wizard of Id strip featuring the King of Id.

=== Main characters ===
- The King: A pint-sized despot modeled after Napoleon; like many characters in the strip, the king is named simply after his role. Occasionally, his name is given as "Id". "Sire" to his subjects, he is greedy, petty and vindictive, but he maintains a sense of humor. Jokes are often centered on his height (about three feet). He wears a crown and cape that makes him look like a playing card (and in the 1960s and 1970s he did resemble the Jack card with his crown decorated with the four card suits). From his throne room he hands out terrible, Draconian punishments for crimes (executions being quite common). He is only ever looking to win votes, power and money. He has a thin skin and a short temper (especially about his height), and main characters often find themselves chained to the wall or the rack if they thoughtlessly insult the king. He is hated by the peasants, who to his dismay often proclaim "The king is a fink!" On one occasion the King calls himself a "fink." However, he is occasionally shown to have a quirky softer side, and it is mentioned his only friends are the moat monsters. His "pets" are a dragon and a St. Bernard dog named Bonapart; he rides Bonapart in fox hunts - although he can ride horses as well. An ancestor of the King - who resembles his descendant - was King of Id II who was beheaded by his successor King of Id III. In regard to the King's parents: his father, who was king until his son overthrew him, is kept in a tower surrounded by "The King of Id" jack-in-the-box toys — the only gifts his son gives him; he also calls his son "A Fink". His mother works as a charwoman and routinely complains and scolds her son — the only person who ever does so. He has a brother named Cyril. His coat of arms is a picture of his head on the body of a bull. The only time the King has ever won anything honestly is when he found out he was going to be selected to appear on bubble gum "Tyrant Cards" series. When the King was unmarried, he did once ask Snow White to introduce him to the Evil Queen so he could date the Queen; however by February 2016 the King has a Queen named Fanabella and a mother-in-law as well. In a comic crossover in connection with the 75th anniversary of the comic strip "Blondie" the King and Julius Dithers were soul brothers. A running gag is that at Christmas the King tries to get presents from Santa Claus and always fails.
- The Wizard: The title character, he is the king's royal wielder of magic, sometimes nicknamed "Wiz". He is smart but sarcastic, good-natured but cynical, and is constantly dominated by his wife, Blanch. He wears a traditional pointed wizards' cap festooned with stars and crescent moons, like Merlin. From his basement, he works over a vat, where his spirit familiar lives. He is capable of powerful spells, but often his plans backfire on him. One time on the day of the Royal picnic a heavy rainstorm broke out. The Wizard tried to dispel the rain by repeating a spell for the rain to go away and to come again some other day; too late he remembers the last time it rained he recited this spell and that the other day is now the Royal picnic day; the angry king has him chained up in the dungeon under a perpetual shower of water! He is friendly to all the king's subjects, but like most of them, he secretly considers the king to be a creep (or a fink). Both his parents are involved with magic. His father can turn himself invisible His 800-year-old mother is also a sorceress; every Mother's Day, she receives a cat from her son.
- Blanch: The Wizard's worse half; his domineering, meddlesome harridan of a wife. It has been said the Wizard married Blanch for her money, for she is considered extremely ugly by everyone in the kingdom. She nags at Wiz every day, and her cooking is awful. Her mother (who is never seen) is apparently just as bad. Occasionally though, she looks to him for romance, which he is hesitant to offer. She also heads the Women's Liberation front in Id. One time the Wizard make a foolish comment to Blanch not to stand too long in an antique store else someone would hang a "For Sale" sign on her; Blanch put him into a vase; another time Gwen asked the Wizard why he did not marry a witch; he did not answer because as Blanch explained his teeth will not allow his tongue to give an answer.

Sir Rodney: Cover of a 1980 Australian collection of strips

- Sir Rodney (Beakmeister) aka "Chicken-Hearted" : His father was Sir Francis Beakmeister. Usually just called "Rodney", he is the king's chief knight and head of the hapless royal army and the Admiral of the Kingdom's Navy. His standard is that of a yellow chicken on a white background. He is a tall, lanky man of dopey intelligence who wears blue chainmail and carries a spear. He is hopeless as a warrior, and his troops are just as incompetent. Rodney is at heart a coward; he is terrified of fighting and often pretends to be good at slaying dragons, while in fact he once bribed one, (known as "Dragy"). He has an enormous nose, the source of many jokes—and is always trying to win the King's attention. He occasionally works as a spy, wearing a tree costume with a large hole to accommodate his nose. His horse is just as much a coward as he is.
- Gwen: A beautiful but frustrated fair maiden who, as her blonde stereotype suggests, is quite clueless. She is adored by all but is in love only with Rodney. They sometimes date, but in his non-macho way he is usually too dense to return the romantic feelings she has for him. She often spends time commiserating with Blanch, or conversing with frogs who claim to be enchanted princes. On February 14, 2016, Rodney arranged with Cupid to give a "Love hit" on Gwen.
- Wellington J. Fransworth Spookingdorf III: Usually just called "Spook", he is a miserable, comically destitute prisoner who for many years has lived in the dungeons beneath the castle. He is covered from head to hip with hair, sometimes being likened to a giant rat. His crime was one of a few mentioned things (when a visiting earl expressed an interest in meeting the only person to beat the king at croquet, he is introduced to the Spook, or when he called the King a "two bit, four flushing, dirty, lowdown, indiscriminate clod" in an early strip), but most of the time it is accepted that the king sentenced Spook to a lifetime in the dungeon for calling him a fink. He is treated poorly by the system, but his best friend is the warder Turnkey, posted outside his cell. He lives beneath the level of the moat, eating "swill," a bland, disgusting slop similar to garbage. For a hobby, he attempts to escape frequently. He normally tunnels under the walls, only to have his plans ironically cut short. His favorite book is "History's Great Escapes" (coincidentally his own autobiography) (strip of June 28, 1967, also published in Remember The Golden Rule). It is mentioned that his full name is Wellington J. Fransworth Spookingdorf the Third in the strip of August 20, 1970, featured in Volume No. 10 of the series. One time the King actually let the Spook out of his dungeon to vote- the Spook voted for the king's opponent-and ended up falling into his dungeon again. Another time Spook was twice released from his dungeon but only to be the "fox" in a fox hunt. On the 50th anniversary of the "Wizard of ID" Beetle Bailey called Sgt Snorkel a "Fink" and ended up beaten up and in the dungeon beside the Spook. As of November 29, 2016, the Spook had failed in his 500th escape attempt.
- Turnkey: The guard who runs the dungeons but spends all his time sitting outside the Spook's cell. In a way their lives are similar—he is stuck in the same place all day and he does not have an important place in the world. He sometimes expresses frustration about this to the Spook.

Bung shown in a Dutch-language version of the cartoon.

- Bung: The court jester, a chronic alcoholic who spends little time entertaining and most of his time in saloons or the royal wine cellar. He wears traditional jester's garb with bells on the bonnet, but he is rarely seen to perform. Frequently drunk, he once declared, "I've learned the secret to avoiding hangovers: Don't sober up!" (A "bung" is a cork in a barrel or bottle of an alcoholic beverage.) In cartoon tradition, his intoxicated state is portrayed by a prominent red nose surrounded by tiny, fizzing bubbles.
- Larsen E. Pettifogger: Attorney-at-law in the kingdom of Id. An unscrupulous, incompetent shyster with a big pretentious nose and stovepipe hat, he lies and cheats to protect criminals. While inept as a lawyer, he is greedy and selfish (a common catchphrase of his is "every man is innocent until proven broke"), and does not mind imbibing alcohol at his clients' expense. Although it is generally accepted that he has never won a case, there have been a few occasions when his clients have been acquitted by chance. For example, once upon exiting the court, he remarked to the defendant, "That was a close one. Once or twice there I thought the judge was going to wake up." On two occasions because of Pettifogger pleading, the King gave each of Pettifogger's clients a "suspended" sentence-one executed by hanging and the other ended up hanging by his thumbs. Pettifogger has been the Spook's lawyer on several occasions and is also the King's stockbroker and is singularly unsuccessful. His appearance and manner are patterned directly after W.C. Fields, one of whose film and radio characters was named "Larson E. Whipsnade". ("Larsen E." is a pun on larceny while the word "pettifogger" means a less-than-scrupulous attorney.)
- Evil Spirit: An apparition who lives in the Wizard's vat and takes form as a smoky puff of gas. He keeps the Wizard company while at work, but he is more childish and gullible than evil. It is sometimes mentioned he has a "sewer wisp" for a girlfriend.
- The Doc: The royal physician, the subject of many doctor jokes. He plays golf, for instance, charges outrageous fees, and is indifferent to the health and welfare of his patients. His name was only revealed once (in a strip reprinted in Strike The Sot!)—Dr. Puckerstein.
- The Duke: A vain, toadying nobleman who helps the King run the castle and shares in the duties of the government. He wears an Elizabethan ruff collar and a pageboy hairdo, is pompous and self-admiring, and he never likes to get his hands dirty. Like Rodney, he strives to impress the King at all times. He is often cited as the King's "P.R. man". His full title, according to a letter he once signed to a peasant requesting an autograph, is "The Duke of Marinello".
- Lackey: The king's personal servant. He never says much, but is loyal enough to stand by the throne and await the King's every order. He is therefore often overworked. However, Lackey has displayed occasional resentment about his position; in one strip, when he informs the king that a vendor has arrived selling slaves, the indignant King orders Lackey to tell the visitor that the King does not believe in slavery. After confirming that the king is serious about this proclamation ("You're darned right!"), Lackey leaves the room, remarking "Tell him yourself, shorty."

=== Supporting characters ===
In addition to the main cast, several recurring jokes have run throughout the life of the comic strip for which certain characters come back from time to time.

- The Night Sentry: Ralph, a formerly unnamed tower guard who cries "Twelve o'clock and all's well", etc., but cannot resist ad-libbing sarcastic commentary—much to the annoyance of the King, who suffers from insomnia.
- The Stablehands: Two unnamed peasants, invariably holding pitchforks and shovels, and unhappy in their work. Hart and Parker would cut to them whenever they had a "dung" joke. The peasants and their work are also used as an analogy for low-level paper-pushing bureaucrats.
- Robbing Hood: A forest-dweller who, unlike the Robin Hood character he parodies, "takes from the wretch and gives to the peer", (usually himself).
- The Lone Haranguer: A phantom heckler who frequently rides past the King's window to shout "The King is a fink!" The King has suffered anxiety over the stranger, but he and Rodney have never succeeded in capturing or identifying him, their plans constantly backfiring on themselves. The name is a play on The Lone Ranger.
- Troob: A local minstrel and poet, (a "troubadour") who travels the kingdom writing songs and commentary on Id's ways of life. He sometimes entertains the King on his lute, but his music is uninviting. He is one of the few people in Id to be streetwise enough to see the bigger picture of the state of the kingdom. His song describes the place well: "The land of Id, 'tis such delight, the land of milk and honey / No need to lock your doors at night, the King has all the money!"
- Yodey: A stable boy whom Rodney is training to become a knight. He is a gigantic oaf, very strong but stupid and gullible. He looks up to Rodney to teach him, even though he is already more capable than Rodney is.
- Abra Cadaver: A Frankenstein-like monster the Wizard built out of old body parts. He is deranged but obedient, and is twice the size of the Wizard. The name is a play on "abracadabra" and "cadaver".
- Bernie the Torch: An accident-prone peasant so unlucky that when he came out of hospital after being run over by a steamroller, a gargoyle fell on him. He was once hit by a meteorite during surgery, after getting run over by a horse.
- Magic Mirror: A talking mirror that lives to insult whoever happens to be addressing it, (usually either the King or Blanch).
- Henry: The Wizard's pet dragon. The running gag is that keeping a dragon as a pet causes a lot of problems for the Wizard and Blanch, such as badly scratched doors, visits to the vet, or things that Henry might bring home.
- The Finks: Name of the Kingdom of Id basketball team
- The Huns: A tribe of raiders that often attack Id. They are depicted as large men completely covered in body hair like the Spook, with shaggy beards and horned "Viking-style" helmets, and armed with spears.

== In other media ==
In 1969, Jim Henson and Don Sahlin produced a test pilot for The Wizard of Id. By the time interest was expressed in the concept Henson was deeply involved in other projects and decided to not pursue it any further.

The comic was also adapted into a cartoon short in 1970, produced by Chuck Jones, directed by Abe Levitow and with voices from Paul Winchell and Don Messick. Mark Houston adapted the strip into a musical which was staged at the University of Oklahoma in 1975.

Paul Williams in the early 1980s touted an Id feature film as upcoming in talk show appearances. "I wanted to do The Wizard of Id as a feature. I went up to Endicott, New York and stayed with Johnny Hart, who became a really good friend, and actually made a deal with Columbia Pictures to do Wizard of Id as a feature. I was going to play the king. Then that whole David Begelman thing happened and it all fell apart."

Characters from the comic were featured in two educational computer games released in 1984, The Wizard of Id's WizMath and The Wizard of Id's WizType.

On April 2, 2026, Goodman Pictures and Tim Johnson, announced that under the new company, Underneath the Umbrella Productions, is planning to adapt The Wizard of Id and B.C. into animation.

== Awards ==
The Wizard of Id was named best humor strip by the National Cartoonists Society in 1971, 1976, 1980, 1982 and 1983. In 1984, Parker received a Reuben Award for his work on the strip. Dozens of paperback collections have been published since 1965, and some of the older titles were still in print as of 2010. In 2009, Titan Books began re-publishing the strips and is printing the complete daily and Sunday strips starting with 1971, publishing one annual collection per year.

== Collections and reprints ==
=== Fawcett Gold Medal ===
- The King Is a Fink! (1969)
- The Wondrous Wizard of Id (1970)
- The Peasants Are Revolting! (1971)
- Remember the Golden Rule! (1971)
- There's a Fly in My Swill! (1973)
- The Wizard's Back (1973)
- Yield (1974)
- Frammin' at the Jim-Jam, Frippin' in the Krotz! (1974)
- Long Live the King! (1975)
- We've Got to Stop Meeting Like This (1975)
- I'm Off to See the Wizard (1976)
- Every Man is Innocent Until Proven Broke (1976)
- Let There Be Reign (1977)
- Help Stamp Out Grapes (1978)
- Charge! (1978)
- Ala Ka-Zot! (1979)
- Well, This Is Another Fine How Do You Do (1982)
- The Lone Haranguer Rides Again! (1982)
- Abra Cadaver! (1983)
- My Kingdom for a Horsie! (1984)
- Suspended Sentence Indeed! (1984)
- The Fing Is a Kink! (1985)
- I Dig Freedom (1985)
- Pick a Card, Any Card (1986)

=== Andrews McMeel ===
- Strike the Sot!: A Wizard of Id Collection (1988) ISBN 0-8362-1804-3
- My Vat Runneth Over!: A Wizard of Id Collection (1989) ISBN 0-8362-1838-8
- Ta-Da!: A Wizard of Id Collection (1990) ISBN 0-8362-1817-5

=== Titan Books ===
- The Best of The Wizard of Id: 40 Years of Mirth, Merriment and Mayhem (2009) Titan Books, ISBN 1-84856-363-9
- The Wizard of Id: Daily and Sunday Strips, 1971 (2011) Titan Books, ISBN 978-1848566835
- The Wizard of Id: Daily and Sunday Strips, 1972 (2012) Titan Books, ISBN 978-1848566842
- The Wizard of Id: Daily and Sunday Strips, 1973 (2013) Titan Books, ISBN 978-1848566859

== International syndication ==
- The strip has been translated into Finnish as Velho, meaning "wizard". A version in the Kainuu dialect called Näläkämoan noeta – Veleho kaenuuks was published in 2001.
- In Denmark it is called Troldkarlen Kogle and has previously appeared in the comic magazine Basserne
- In Italy, The Wizard of Id is known as Mago Wiz (Wiz The Sorcerer) and has been published in the comics magazines Il Mago and Linus, and in the science fiction magazine Urania, plus several hardcover editions also by Mondadori.
- The German version is called Magnus der Magier (Magnus the Magician).
- In Sweden it is called Trollkarlen från id.
- In the Netherlands it is called De Tovenaar van Fop. (The Wizard of Fool, "fool" in the sense of "to trick".)
- The strip is known in many Spanish-speaking countries as El Mago Fedor. However, it is only published nowadays online on GoComics.com, under its English title, and has not been syndicated in South American newspapers since the mid-1990s (by that time practically all newspapers in the continent dropped them, as tastes began to change to more locally originated fare).
- In India it is published in English in the comics section of the English daily newspaper Deccan Chronicle and The Times of India.
- In Pakistan it is published daily in the English newspaper 'Dawn'.
- Treatment of the comic strip varies in individual countries, especially in monarchies. In Saudi Arabia, references to the king are deleted and replaced with "the boss".
