= Out of Bounds (comic strip) =

American comic strip (1986–1998)

- Author: Don Wilder
- Illustrator: Bill Rechin
- Current status/schedule: Concluded, in reruns
- Launch date: June 2, 1986
- End date: 1998
- Syndicate(s): News America Syndicate (1986–1987); News America Syndicate (1987–1997); Crock Associates (self-syndication) (1997–1998)
- Genre(s): Humor, Sports

Out of Bounds is a comic strip by Don Wilder (1934–2008) and Bill Rechin (1930–2011). It was first syndicated on June 2, 1986, and ran until 1998. Rechin received the National Cartoonist Society Newspaper Panel Cartoon Award for 1992 for his work on the strip.
