= Johnny Hart =

American cartoonist

- Born: John Lewis Hart; February 18, 1931 Endicott, New York, U.S.
- Died: April 7, 2007 (aged 76) Nineveh, New York, U.S.
- Areas: artist, writer
- Notable works: B.C. The Wizard of Id
- Awards: full list
- Spouse: Ida Jane "Bobby" Hatcher (1932–2018)

John Lewis Hart (February 18, 1931 – April 7, 2007) was an American cartoonist noted as the creator of the comic strips B.C. and The Wizard of Id. Brant Parker co-produced and illustrated The Wizard of Id. Hart was recognized with several awards, including the Swedish Adamson Award and five from the National Cartoonists Society. In his later years, he was known (and sometimes criticized) for incorporating Christian themes and messages into his strips and seeming to denigrate other religions. Hart was referred to by Chuck Colson in a Breakpoint column as "the most widely read Christian of our time", over C. S. Lewis, Frank E. Peretti, and Billy Graham.

== Biography ==
Born in Endicott, New York, Hart published his first work in Stars and Stripes while he served in Korea as an enlisted member of the United States Air Force. Returning in 1953, he published cartoons in The Saturday Evening Post, Collier's Weekly and other magazines. His pre-cartooning employment included working in a barbecue restaurant and sign painting. Hart's biggest success, B.C., was created in 1957 and began appearing in national daily newspapers on February 17, 1958. Hart also co-created and wrote the comic strip The Wizard of Id, drawn by Brant Parker, which has been distributed since November 9, 1964.

According to cartoonist Dale Hale, Hanna-Barbera approached Hart about creating an animated B.C. series, but instead ended up creating their own caveman cartoon which eventually became The Flintstones.

Hart died of a stroke on April 7, 2007. According to his wife Bobby, he was working at his drawing table at the time of his death. His co-creator for The Wizard of Id, Brant Parker, died just eight days later, on April 15, 2007.

=== Religious convictions ===
Hart was raised in a casually religious family, and he attended Christian Sunday School regularly. Although his formal education ended with high school, he was fascinated by the Bible from a young age. In 1984 there was a distinguishable shift in Hart's spirituality, and Hart and wife Bobby began attending a congregation of the Presbyterian Church in Nineveh, New York. Hart attributed his religious awakening to a father-son team of contractors who installed a satellite dish at his home. Hart's increasingly deep religious faith, and the staunch theological and political conservatism that accompanied it, came to be the source of considerable controversy in the later years of his life. In a 1999 interview with The Washington Post, for example, he stated that "Jews and Muslims who don't accept Jesus will burn in Hell" and that "homosexuality is the handiwork of Satan." In the same piece, Hart opined that "the end of the world is approaching, maybe by the year 2010." The lion's share of controversy, however, came from Hart's increasing tendency to incorporate his religious and political themes and ideals into his comic strips, especially B.C. Some newspapers refused to print strips with overtly religious themes or, as with the Los Angeles Times, moved them to the religious section of the newspaper.

=== Controversial strips ===
Two strips in particular were controversial. The B.C. strip for April 15, 2001, which was Easter Sunday, portrayed a Jewish menorah with seven candles progressively burning out as the strip captions ran the words of Jesus Christ. At the end, the outer arms of the candelabrum broke away, leaving a Christian cross, with the final panel portraying the opened and empty tomb of Christ. Critics including the Anti-Defamation League and the American Jewish Committee argued that Hart's strip portrayed replacement theology, that is, the conception of Christianity as supplanting Judaism. Hart offered an apology "if I have offended any readers", but said he still thought the strip could increase "religious awareness" and claimed that he had meant the strip to be a tribute to both religions.

Another B.C. strip, which ran November 10, 2003 (on the 15th day of the month of Ramadan), showed an outhouse with a traditional crescent symbol on its door, which a character entered with a graphic labeled "SLAM", and then asked, "Is it just me, or does it stink in here?" The Washington Post described the layout of "SLAM" as "stacked vertically, in the shape of an I". Critics including the Council on American-Islamic Relations claimed that the combination of the vertical bar and the "SLAM", as well as the crescent moons both in the sky and on the outhouse, made the strip a slur on Islam. Hart denied that it was anything but an outhouse joke.

== Support of his local community of Broome County and Binghamton, New York ==
Hart was an active member of his local community – the area of Greater Binghamton in Broome County, New York, which shares a common abbreviation of "B.C." Hart donated B.C.-based drawings and logos free of charge to many entities and organizations found in the Broome County area, including logos for:

- B.C. Transit – Caveman on Wheel
- Broome County Parks – Dinosaur
- Broome County Meals on Wheels – Caveman on Wheel with Food
- Southern Tier Red Cross – Caveman building Red Cross with Bricks
- Broome County Celtic Pipes and Drums – Caveman wearing Kilt and playing Bagpipes
- Broome County Celtic Kazoos – Irish Caveman with Kazoo
- B.C. Open PGA Tour Event (1971–2006) – Caveman golfing
- Broome Dusters NAHL Hockey Club – Caveman with hockey stick
- B.C. Icemen UHL Hockey Club – Brute Cavemen playing hockey
- Southern Tier Independence Center – Caveman in stone wheelchair stuck in cave doorway, "Wiley" character navigating a landscape full of holes

Hart's involvement with the B.C. Open dated back to the early 1970s, and characters from B.C. were used extensively in advertising and marketing materials for the event, including the winner's trophy, which was a bronzed version of a hapless B.C. Caveman golfing, a light-hearted trophy when compared to many others, leading it to have earned the designation of being "voted by the players on Tour as the best trophy on Tour; the one that they would love to have."

Additionally, Hart contributed original panels of B.C. strips for charity auctions with the Binghamton, New York-based PBS affiliate, WSKG-TV. He also provided album cover art for the 1999 album Still Fresh by the world-famous jazz vocal group The Four Freshmen, and his strips for B.C. were the inspiration for the UC Irvine Anteaters mascot.

== Personal life ==
He and his wife Bobby had two daughters, Patti and Perri. Perri died in 2023 at the age of 56. As of January 2026, Patti and her two sons Mason and Mick Mastroianni remain the three members of "Team B.C."

== Comics tributes ==
Hart was memorialized in a May 14, 2007, strip of the comic strip Mother Goose & Grimm by Mike Peters. In the June 20, 2007, Blondie strip by Dean Young, the last panel shows the Mr. Dithers character saying, "Boy oh boy, that Johnny Hart sure knew his stuff, didn't he?" Bruce Tinsley honored Hart in his Mallard Fillmore strip of July 10, 2007.

A July 10, 2007 Mallard Fillmore tribute.

There was also a tribute in The Wizard of Id strip from Hart's grandson Mason Mastroianni. In the February 14, 2008, strip, two peasant women are talking. One who has just bought some flowers says: "How come you don't celebrate Valentine's Day?" and the other answers: "My Hart isn't in it this year."

=== Ant colony cartoons and Mastroianni poems or cartoons ===
Traditionally, every December 3, Johnny Hart would draw a B.C. cartoon with his wife Ida "Bobby" Hart portrayed as the queen of the ant colony, to celebrate her birthday. On December 3, 2007, his grandson Mason Mastroianni carried on the tradition, a practice he would keep up yearly until 2019, the year after Bobby Hart's death.

=== grOnk ===
In January 1967, the Canadian writer bpNichol edited and published the first issue of the avantgarde literary magazine grOnk, named after the prelinguistic sound uttered by dinosaurs in Hart's B.C.. grOnk ran for at least 122 issues in various series until the time of Nichol's death in 1988, with a further seven "Inadmissible Series" issues published posthumously.

== Awards ==
With the release of Wizard of Id in 1964, Hart became one of only four cartoonists to have two comic strips appearing in over 1000 papers each. He won numerous awards for his work, including the National Cartoonists Society's Reuben award for B.C. in 1968 and Wizard of Id in 1984.

- 1967 – BC – Best Humor Strip

National Cartoonists Society Newspaper Comic Strip (Humor) Award

- 1968 – BC– Reuben Award – Outstanding Cartoonist of the Year

National Cartoonists Society

- 1970 – BC – Yellow Kid Award – Best Cartoonist of the Year

The International Congress of Comics – Lucca, Italy. This was the first time this award was given to an American cartoonist.

- 1971 – BC – Best Cartoonist of the Year – France
- 1971 – Wizard of Id – Best Humor strip – Brant Parker

National Cartoonists Society

- 1972 – NASA Public Service Award

For outstanding contributions to NASA

- 1973 – B.C. The First Thanksgiving — Best Animation Feature

The National Cartoonists Society

- 1974 – B.C. Tickets for ACTION — Silver Bell Award – Best Animated Television Commercial

The Advertising Council

- 1974 – B.C. 'A' We're the ACTION Corps — Golden Spike Award – Best Animated Television Commercial

The International Society of Radio and Television Broadcasters

- 1976 – BC – Adamson Award ("The Sam" Adamson Award) – Best International Comic Strip Cartoonist

The Swedish Academy of Comic Art

- 1976 — Inkpot Award

San Diego Comic-Con

- 1976 – Wizard of Id – Best Humor strip – Brant Parker

The National Cartoonist Society

- 1980 – Wizard of Id – Best Humor strip – Brant Parker

The National Cartoonist Society

- 1981 – B.C. – The Elzie Segar Award – Outstanding Contribution to the Profession of Cartooning

King Features Syndicate

- 1982 – B.C. A Special Christmas — Golden Sheaf Award – Spontaneous Human Category

The Yorkton Short Film and Video Festival – Canada

- 1982 – B.C.: A Special Christmas – Special Jury Award

The Yorkton Short Film and Video Festival – Canada

- 1982 – Wizard of Id – Best Humor strip – Brant Parker

The National Cartoonists Society

- 1983 – Wizard of Id – Best Humor strip – Brant Parker

The National Cartoonists Society

- 1984 – Wizard of Id – Reuben Award – Outstanding Cartoonist of the Year – Brant Parker

The National Cartoonists Society

- 1985 – Wizard of Id – "The Sam" Adamson Award – Best International Comic Strip Cartoonist – Brant Parker

The Swedish Academy of Comic Art

- 1986 – B.C. – Katie Award – Best Magazine Cover – "D Magazine"

The Press Club of Dallas

- 1986 – Wizard of Id – The Elzie Segar Award – Outstanding Contribution to the Profession of Cartooning – Brant Parker

King Features Syndicate

- 1988 – B.C. ("Less Filling") – Telly Award – Best Television Commercial – Animation

Monroe Shocks

- 1989 – B.C. – Best Newspaper Strip

National Cartoonists Society

- 1992 – B.C. – Max and Moritz Award – Best Comic Strip

The Comic Salon – Erlangen, Germany

- 1995 – B.C. (Easter 1995 cartoon) – Wilbur Award – Editorial Cartoon / Comic Strip Category

The Religious Public Relations Council Inc – Dallas
