= Freeport, New York =

- Village
- Incorporated Village of Freeport
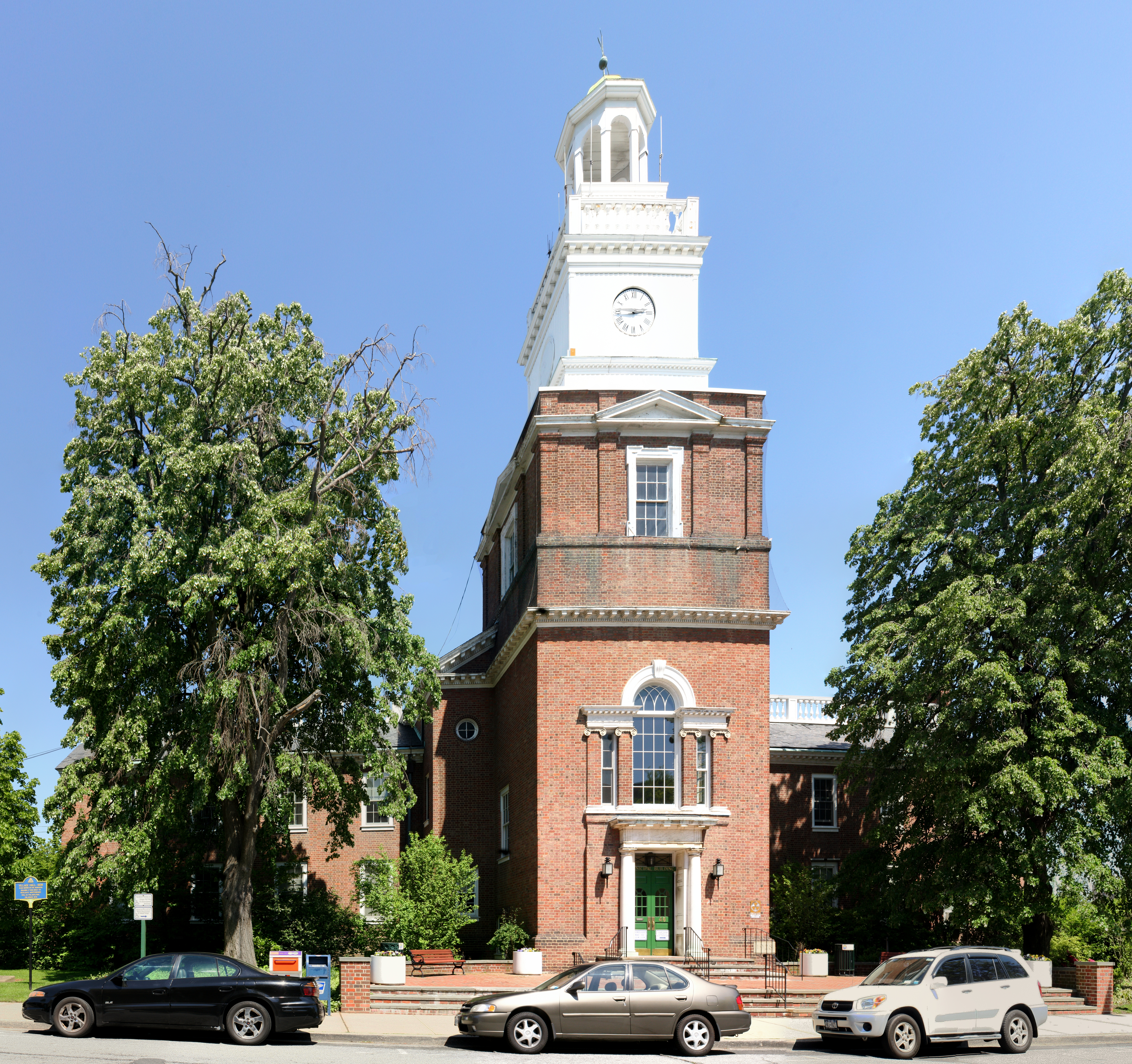
- Freeport Village Hall – designed to mimic Independence Hall – in 2012

- Flag Seal

- Location in Nassau County and the state of New York

- Location on Long Island Location within the state of New York
- Coordinates: 40°39′14″N 73°35′13″W
- Country: United States
- State: New York
- County: Nassau
- Town: Hempstead
- Incorporated: 1892

Government
  - Mayor: Robert T. Kennedy

Area
  - Total: 4.87 sq mi (12.61 km^{2})
  - Land: 4.58 sq mi (11.86 km^{2})
  - Water: 0.29 sq mi (0.76 km^{2})
- Elevation: 20 ft (6 m)

Population (2020)
  - Total: 44,472
  - Density: 9,714.0/sq mi (3,750.58/km^{2})
- Time zone: UTC−5 (Eastern (EST))
  - Summer (DST): UTC−4 (EDT)
- ZIP Code: 11520
- Area codes: 516, 363
- FIPS code: 36-27485
- GNIS feature ID: 2390852
- Website: www.freeportny.com

Freeport is a village located within the town of Hempstead, in Nassau County, on the South Shore of Long Island, in New York, United States. The population was 44,472 at the time of the 2020 census, making it the second largest village in New York by population.

A settlement since the 1640s, it was once an oystering community and later a resort popular with the New York City theater community. It is now primarily a bedroom suburb but retains a modest commercial waterfront and some light industry.

== History ==
=== Pre-colonial settlement ===
Before people of European ancestry came to the area, the land was part of the territory of the Meroke Indians. Written records of the community go back to the 1640s. The village now known as Freeport was part of an area called "the Great South Woods" during colonial times. In the mid-17th century, the area was renamed Raynor South, and ultimately Raynortown, after a herdsman named Edward Raynor, who had moved to the area from Hempstead in 1659, cleared land, and built a cabin.

=== 19th century: development ===
In 1853, residents voted to rename the village Freeport, adopting a variant of a nickname used by ship captains during colonial times because they were not charged customs duties to land their cargo.

After the Civil War, Freeport became a center for commercial oystering. This trade began to decline as early as the beginning of the 20th century because of changing salinity and increased pollution in Great South Bay. Nonetheless, even as of the early 21st century Freeport and nearby Point Lookout have the largest concentration of commercial fishing activity anywhere near New York City.

From 1868, Freeport was served by the Southside Railroad, which was a major boon to development. The most prominent figure in this boom was developer John J. Randall; among his other contributions to the shape of Freeport today were several canals, including the Woodcleft Canal, one side of which is now the site of the "Nautical Mile". Randall, who opposed all of Freeport's being laid out in a grid, put up a Victorian house virtually overnight on a triangular plot at the corner of Lena Avenue and Wilson Place to spite the grid designers. The Freeport Spite House still is standing and occupied.

In January 1873, before Nassau County had split off from Queens, the Queens County treasurer set up an office at Freeport. The village residents voted to incorporate the village on October 18, 1892, and the Bay View area, originally named "Coe's Neck", after Robert Coe, a founding colonist, agreed to join. At that time, it had a population of 1,821. In 1898, Freeport established a municipal electric utility, which still operates today, giving the village lower electricity rates than those in surrounding communities. It is one of two municipally owned electric systems in Nassau County; the other is in Rockville Centre. Public street lighting was begun in 1907, and a public fire alarm system was adopted in 1910.

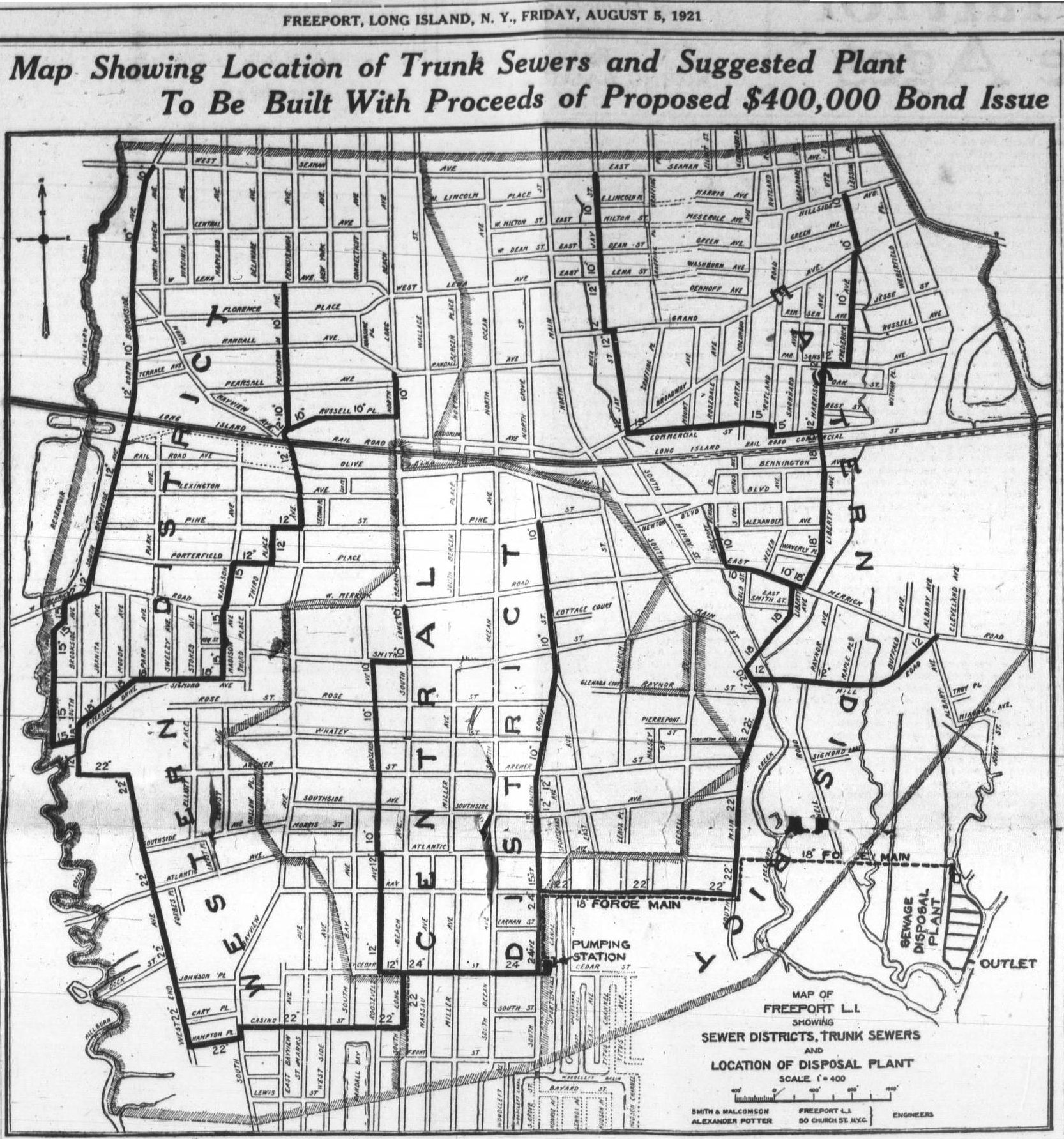
Map, 1921 More details This map of Freeport relates to a sewer bond issue; the districts shown are sewer districts, and trunk sewers are shown in detail. The borders shown are not exactly those of the village (Freeport continues north of Seaman Avenue, and of course this map is cut off to the south). The map predates the construction of Sunrise Highway (just south of the railroad tracks), and roughly the northern two-thirds of what is shown as a reservoir at left is now the site of Freeport High School and its grounds. However, this does provide a detailed map of most Freeport streets at that time, a great many of which still retain the same locations and names.

=== 1900–1939: expansion ===
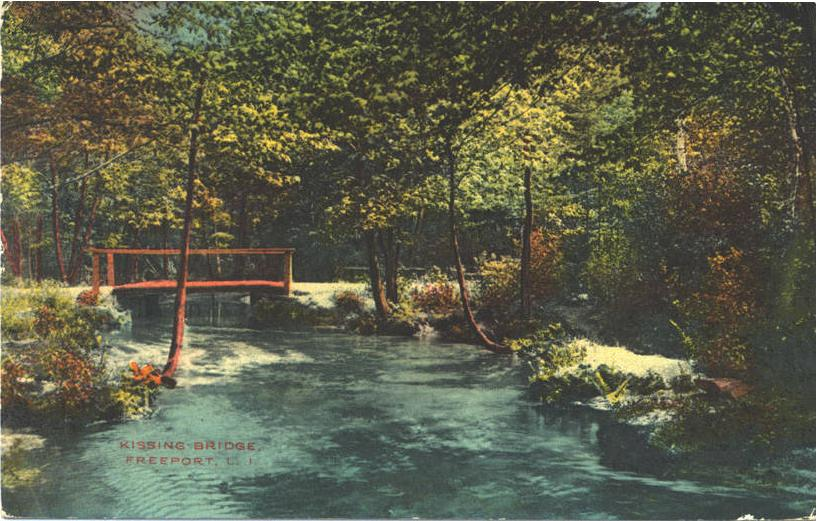
The former "Kissing Bridge," which crossed the Freeport-Baldwin border over Milburn Creek at Seaman Avenue, c. 1913.

In the years after incorporation, Freeport was a tourist and sportsman's destination for its boating and fishing.

From 1902 into the late 1920s, the New York and Long Island Traction Corporation ran trolleys through Freeport to Jamaica, Hempstead, and Brooklyn. These trolleys went down Main Street in Freeport, connecting to a ferry at Scott's Hotel near Ray Street. In later years these ferries departed from Ellison's dock on Little Swift Creek, served by separate trolleys operated by the Great South Bay Ferry Company. The ferries took people to Point Lookout, about three miles (5 km) south of Freeport, where there is an ocean beach. For a few years after 1913, the short-lived Freeport Railroad Company ran a trolley nicknamed "the Fishermen's Delight" along Grove Street (now Guy Lombardo Avenue) from Sunrise Highway to the waterfront. Also in this era, in 1910 Arthur and Albert Heinrich flew the first American-made, American-powered monoplane, built in their Merrick Road airplane factory (see also Heinrich Pursuit). WGBB, founded in 1924, became Long Island's first 24-hour radio station.

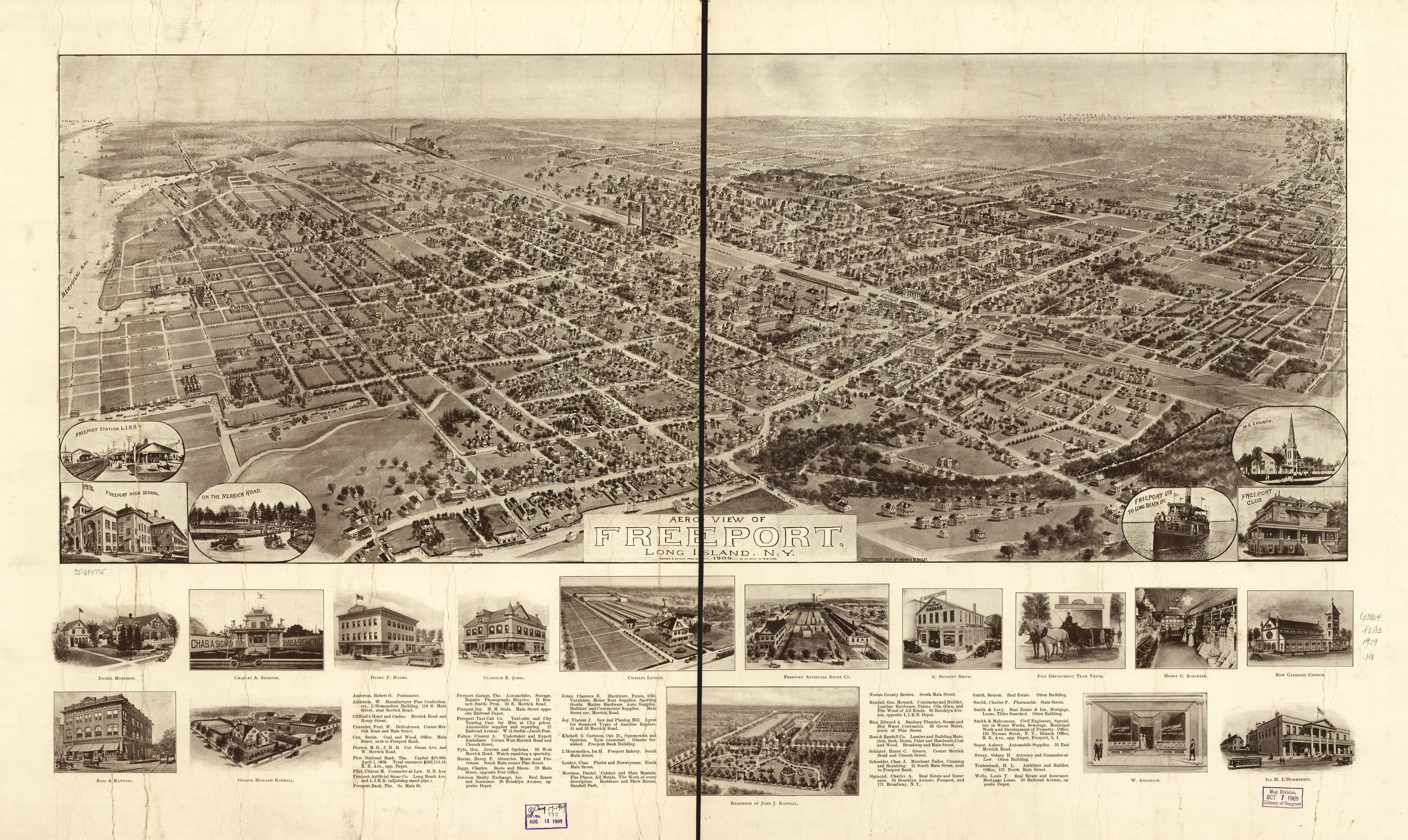
1909 Hughes & Bailey map

In the late 19th century, Freeport was the summer resort of wealthy politicians, publishers, and so forth. At the time, travel from Freeport to New York City required a journey of several hours on a coal-powered train, or an even more arduous automobile trip on the single-lane Merrick Road.

According to Elinor Smith, the arrival of Diamond Jim Brady and Lillian Russell around the start of the 20th century marked the beginning of what by 1914 would become an unofficial theatrical artists' colony, especially of vaudeville performers. Freeport's population was largest in the summer season, during which most of the theaters of the time were closed and performers left for cooler climes. Some had year-round family homes in Freeport. Leo Carrillo and Victor Moore were early arrivals, later joined by Fannie Brice, Trixie Friganza, Sophie Tucker, Harry Ruby, Fred Stone, Helen Broderick, Moran and Mack, Will Rogers, Bert Kalmar, Richard Whiting, Harry von Tilzer, Rae Samuels, Belle Baker, Grace Hayes, Pat Rooney, Duffy and Sweeney, the Four Mortons, McKay and Ardine, and Eva Tanguay. Buster Keaton, W. C. Fields, and many other theatrical performers who did not own homes there were also frequent visitors.

Several of Freeport's actors gathered together as the Long Island Good Hearted Thespian Society (LIGHTS), with a clubhouse facing onto Great South Bay. LIGHTS presented summer shows in Freeport from the mid-1910s to the mid-1920s. LIGHTS also sponsored a summertime "Christmas Parade", featuring clowns, acrobats, and once even some borrowed elephants. It was held at this unlikely time of year because the theater people were all working during the real Christmas season. A Coney Island–style amusement park called Playland Park thrived from the early 1920s until the early 1930s but was destroyed by a fire on June 28, 1931.

With the resurgence of the Ku Klux Klan on Long Island in the 1920s, many villages in Nassau and Suffolk counties were the focal point of Klan activity. According to a story in Newsday detailing the history of Long Island,

often, respected clergymen and public officials openly supported the Klan and attended its rallies. On Sept. 20, 1924, for instance, the Klan drew 30,000 spectators to a parade through Freeport – with the village police chief, John M. Hartman, leading a procession of 2,000 robed men.... the founding of one of Long Island's first klaverns, in Freeport, was memorialized on Sept. 8, 1922, in the Daily Review, which carried a banner headline about the meeting at Mechanics Hall on Railroad Avenue. About 150 new members were greeted by seven robed Klansmen.

=== 1940–present: recent history ===
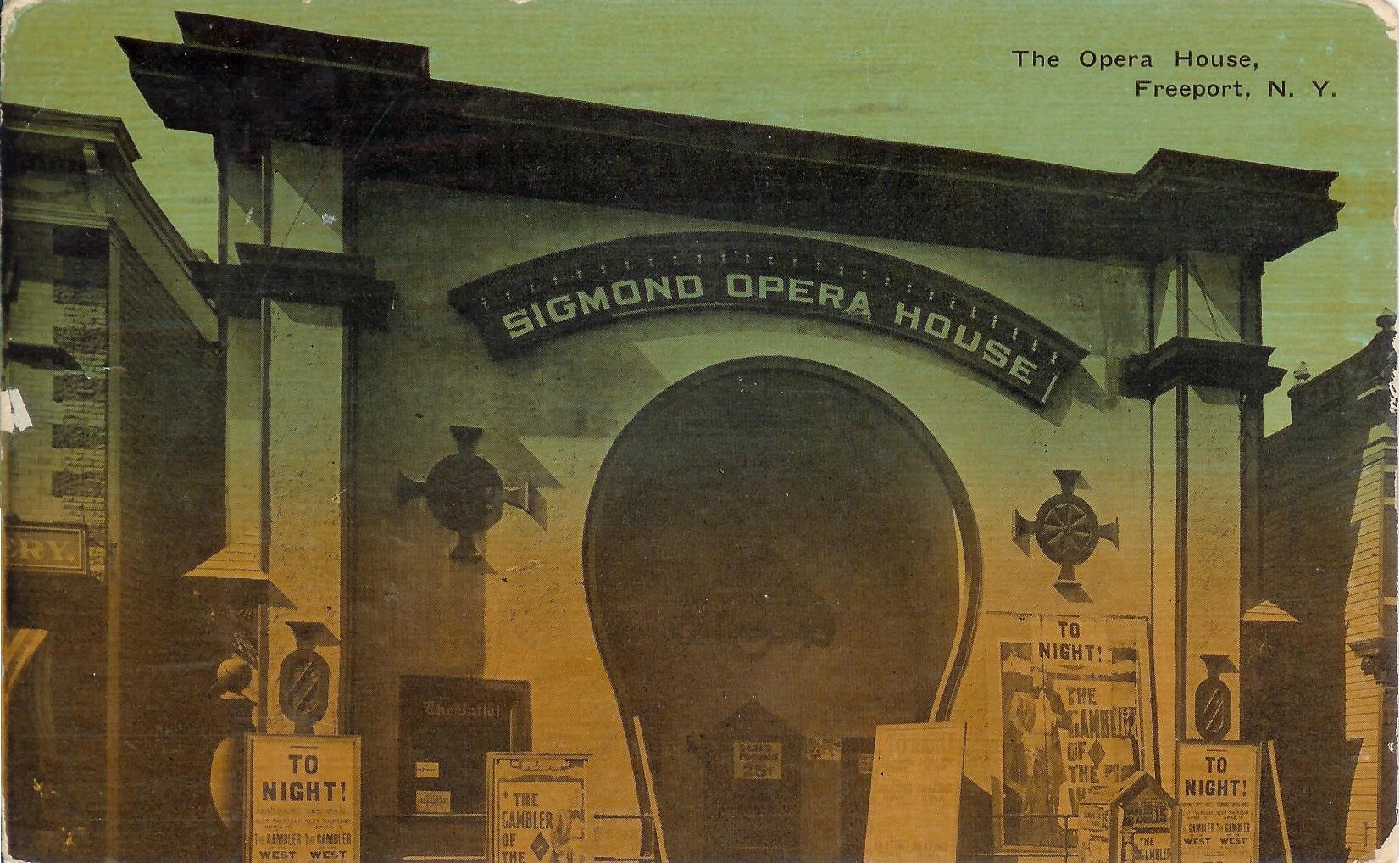
The Sigmond Opera House (shown here c. 1913), originally a vaudeville theater and later a cinema, stood at 70 South Main Street. It burned on January 31, 1924.

By 1937, Freeport's population exceeded 20,000, and it was the largest village in Nassau County. After World War II the village became a bedroom community for New York City. The separation between the two eras was marked by a fire that destroyed the Shorecrest Hotel (originally the Crystal Lake Hotel) on January 14, 1958. During the 1950s local merchants resisted building any shopping malls in the village and subsequently suffered a great loss of business when large malls were built in communities in the central part of Long Island.

The landscape of Freeport underwent further change with a significant increase in apartment building construction. When such buildings went up in just two years in the early 1960s, the Village passed a moratorium on multi-unit residential construction.

While never a major boatbuilding center, Freeport can boast some notable figures in that field. Fred and Mirto Scopinich operated their boatyard in Freeport from just after World War I until they moved it to East Quogue in the late 1960s. Their Freeport Point Shipyard built boats for the United States Coast Guard, but also for Prohibition-era rumrunners. From 1937 to 1945 the shipyard built small boats for the United States Navy and British Royal Navy. The marina and dealership operated by Al Grover in 1950 remains in Freeport and in his family. Grover's company built fishing skiffs from the 1970s until about 1990. One of these, a 26-footer, carried Grover and his sons from Nova Scotia to Portugal in 1985, the first-ever crossing of the Atlantic Ocean by a boat powered by an outboard motor. Columbian Bronze operated in Freeport from its 1901 founding until it closed shop in 1988. Among this company's achievements was the propeller for the USS Nautilus, an operational nuclear-powered submarine and the first vessel to complete a submerged transit across the North Pole.

== Geography ==
According to the United States Census Bureau, the village has a total area of 4.6 square miles (12 km^{2}).

The village is bisected by east–west New York State Route 27 (Sunrise Highway). The Meadowbrook State Parkway defines its eastern boundary.

The southern part of the village is penetrated by several canals that allow access to the Atlantic Ocean by means of passage through salt marshes. The oldest canal is the late 19th-century Woodcleft Canal. Freeport has extensive small-boat facilities and a resident fishing fleet, as well as charter and open water fishing boats.

=== Climate ===
According to the Köppen climate classification, Freeport has a Humid subtropical climate (type Cfa) with cool, wet winters and hot, humid summers. Precipitation is uniform throughout the year, with slight spring and fall peaks.

== Demographics ==
Historical population
Census	Pop.	Note	%±
1880	1,217		—
1900	2,612		—
1910	4,836		85.1%
1920	8,599		77.8%
1930	15,467		79.9%
1940	20,410		32.0%
1950	24,680		20.9%
1960	34,419		39.5%
1970	40,374		17.3%
1980	38,272		−5.2%
1990	39,894		4.2%
2000	43,783		9.7%
2010	42,860		−2.1%
2020	44,472		3.8%
U.S. Decennial Census

=== Racial and ethnic composition ===
Freeport village, New York – Racial and ethnic composition Note: the US Census treats Hispanic/Latino as an ethnic category. This table excludes Latinos from the racial categories and assigns them to a separate category. Hispanics/Latinos may be of any race.
Race / Ethnicity (NH = Non-Hispanic)	Pop 2000	Pop 2010	Pop 2020	% 2000	% 2010	% 2020
White alone (NH)	13,835	10,113	7,632	31.60%	23.60%	17.16%
Black or African American alone (NH)	13,610	13,226	12,830	31.09%	30.86%	28.85%
Native American or Alaska Native alone (NH)	102	94	89	0.23%	0.22%	0.20%
Asian alone (NH)	579	669	792	1.32%	1.56%	1.78%
Native Hawaiian or Pacific Islander alone (NH)	6	9	15	0.01%	0.02%	0.03%
Other race alone (NH)	164	174	545	0.37%	0.41%	1.23%
Mixed race or Multiracial (NH)	839	717	1,257	1.92%	1.67%	2.83%
Hispanic or Latino (any race)	14,648	17,858	21,312	33.46%	41.67%	47.92%
Total	43,783	42,860	44,472	100.00%	100.00%	100.00%

=== 2020 census ===
As of the 2020 census, Freeport had a population of 44,472. The median age was 39.4 years. 21.6% of residents were under the age of 18 and 15.4% of residents were 65 years of age or older. For every 100 females there were 92.8 males, and for every 100 females age 18 and over there were 89.4 males age 18 and over.

100.0% of residents lived in urban areas, while 0.0% lived in rural areas.

There were 13,501 households in Freeport, of which 36.8% had children under the age of 18 living in them. Of all households, 43.1% were married-couple households, 17.1% were households with a male householder and no spouse or partner present, and 32.3% were households with a female householder and no spouse or partner present. About 22.5% of all households were made up of individuals and 10.2% had someone living alone who was 65 years of age or older.

There were 14,137 housing units, of which 4.5% were vacant. The homeowner vacancy rate was 1.4% and the rental vacancy rate was 2.5%.

Racial composition as of the 2020 census
Race	Number	Percent
White	9,692	21.8%
Black or African American	13,508	30.4%
American Indian and Alaska Native	527	1.2%
Asian	844	1.9%
Native Hawaiian and Other Pacific Islander	26	0.1%
Some other race	13,539	30.4%
Two or more races	6,336	14.2%
Hispanic or Latino (of any race)	21,312	47.9%

==== Demographic estimates ====
At the 2020 American Community Survey, the Latino population was 16.2% Dominican, 9% Salvadoran, 4.2% Puerto Rican, 3% Guatemalan, 2.2% Colombian, 1.7% Ecuadorian.

=== 2010 census ===
As of 2010, the population was 42,860. The demographics were as follows:

- Hispanic – 17,858 (42.5%)
- Black alone – 13,226 (30.9%)
- White alone – 10,113 (23.6%)
- Asian alone – 669 (1.6%)
- Two or more races – 174 (0.4%)
- Other race alone – 292 (0.7%)
- American Indian alone – 94 (0.2%)

=== 2000 census ===
As of the census of 2000, there were 43,783 people, 13,504 households, and 9,911 families residing in the village. The population density was 9,531.3 inhabitants per square mile (3,680.1/km^{2}). There were 13,819 housing units at an average density of 3,008.3 per square mile (1,161.5/km^{2}). The racial makeup of the village was 42.9% White, 32.6% African American, 0.5% Native American, 1.4% Asian, 0.1% Pacific Islander, 17.2% from other races, and 5.4% from two or more races. Hispanic or Latino of any race were 33.5% of the population.

There were 13,504 households, out of which 36.4% had children under the age of 18 living with them, 49.7% were married couples living together, 17.8% had a female householder with no husband present, and 26.6% were non-families. 21.2% of all households were made up of individuals, and 8.1% had someone living alone who was 65 years of age or older. The average household size was 3.20 and the average family size was 3.65.

In the village, the population was spread out, with 26.4% under the age of 18, 9.1% from 18 to 24, 32.1% from 25 to 44, 22.0% from 45 to 64, and 10.5% who were 65 years of age or older. The median age was 35 years. For every 100 females, there were 92.6 males. For every 100 females age 18 and over, there were 89.3 males.

The median income for a household in the village in 1999 was $55,948, and the median income for a family was $61,673. Males had a median income of $37,465 versus $31,869 for females. The per capita income for the village was $21,288. About 8.0% of families and 10.6% of the population were below the poverty line, including 11.5% of those under age 18 and 7.4% of those age 65 or over.

== Government ==
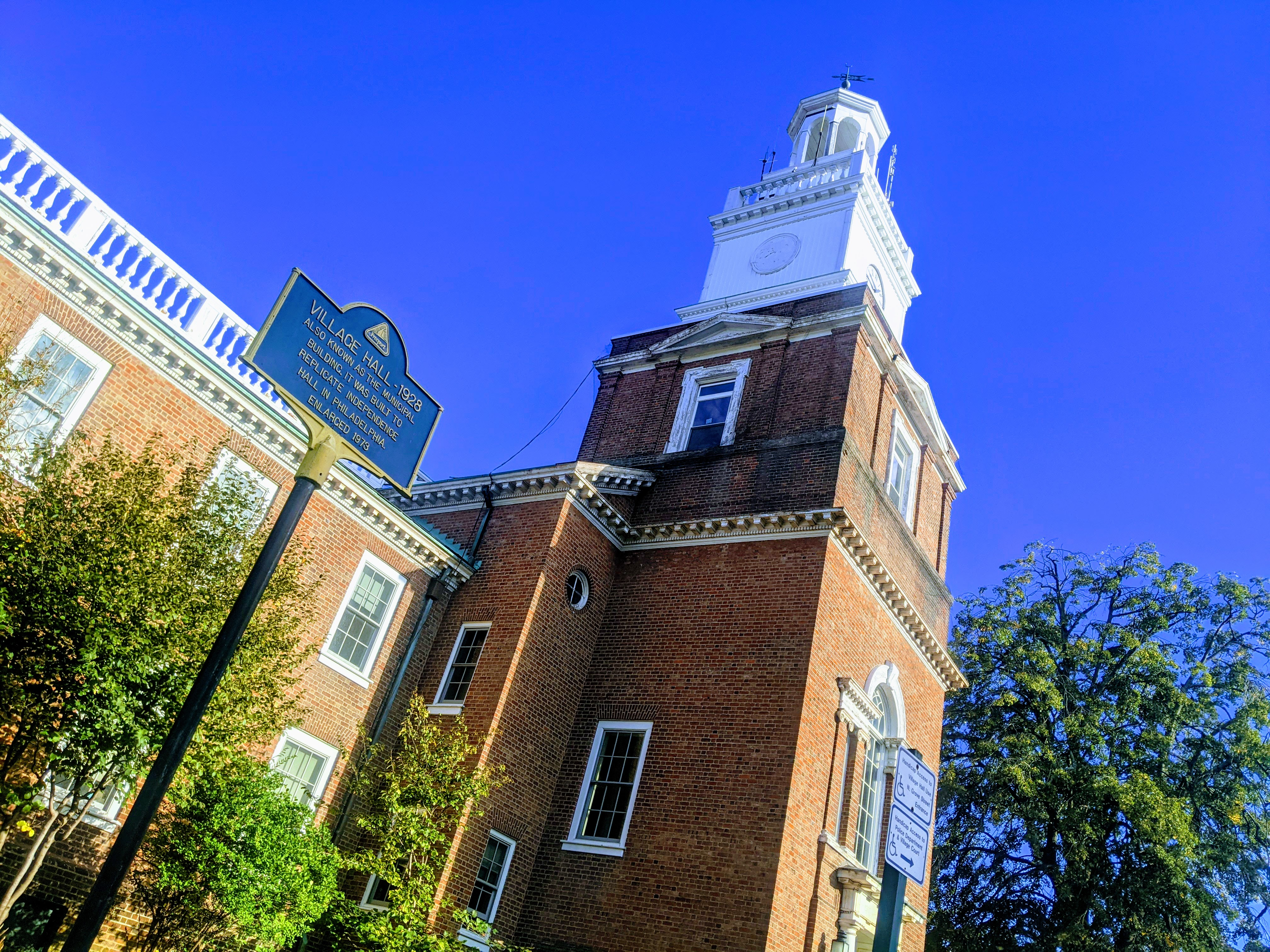
Freeport Village Hall in 2021

Freeport's government is made up of four trustees and a mayor, who are elected to four-year terms; one trustee also serves in the capacity of deputy mayor. Freeport's first African American mayor, Andrew Hardwick, was elected in 2009; he was succeeded on March 20, 2013, by Robert T. Kennedy. The current Deputy Mayor is (Trustee) Ronald Ellerbe. The other current Trustees are, Jorge Martinez, Christopher Squeri, and Evette Sanchez.

Freeport's current government is a coalition of Democrats, Republicans and Independents.

=== Mayors ===
The following is a list of mayors of Freeport since 1892:

- Carman Cornelius, 1892-1893
- William G. Miller, 1893-1900
- George Wallace, 1900-1902
- James Dean, 1902-1905
- Julius Detmer, 1905-1906
- Hiram R. Smith, 1906-1907
- Daniel Morrison, 1907-1910
- John D. Gunning, 1910-1912
- James Hanse, 1912-1913
- Smith Cox, 1913-1914
- Roland M. Lamb, 1914-1916
- Ernest R. Randall, 1916-1917
- Sidney H. Swezey, 1917-1918
- Robert G. Anderson, 1918-1920
- Clarence Edwards, 1920-1921
- Robert L. Christie, 1921-1923
- Hilbert R. Johnson, 1923-1924
- Raymond J. Miller, 1924-1925
- W. Irving Vanderpoel, 1925-1926
- John Cruickshank, 1926-1927
- Clinton M. Flint, 1927-1931, 1943-1945
- Russell S. Randall, 1931-1933
- Robert E. Patterson, 1933-1941
- Worden E. Winne, 1941-1943
- Cyril C. Ryan, 1945-1949
- Robert L. Doxsee, 1949-1953
- William F. Glacken Sr., 1953-1961
- Robert J. Sweeney, 1961-1973
- William H. White, 1973-1985
- Dorothy Storm, 1985-1993
- Art Thompson, 1993-1995
- Richard Wissler, 1995-1997
- William F. Glacken Jr., 1997-2009
- Andrew Hardwick, 2009-2013
- Robert T. Kennedy, 2013-present

== Arts and culture ==
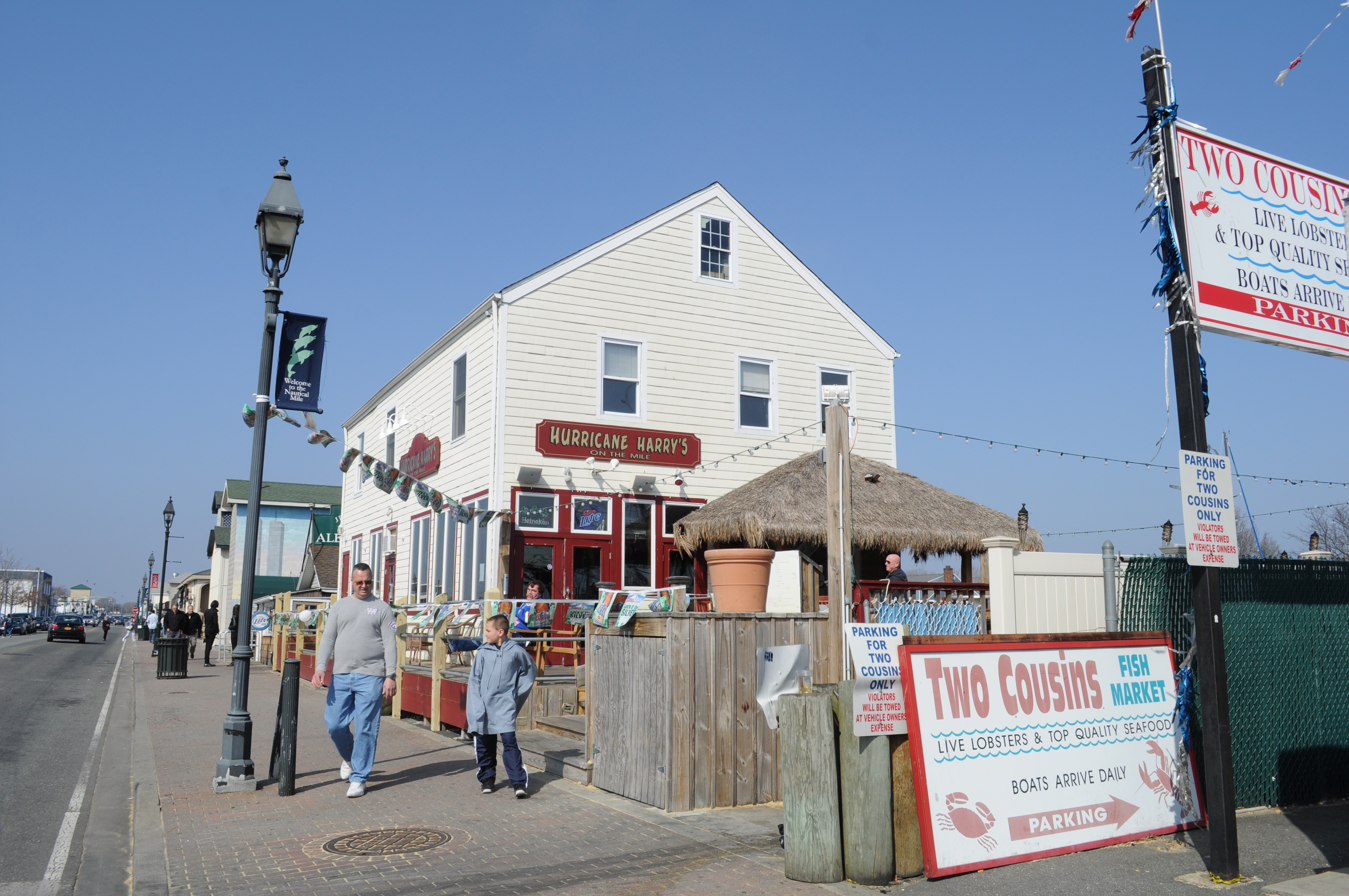
On the Nautical Mile, 2012

Freeport is a Long Island hot spot during the summer season in New York. A popular festival occurs on Freeport's Nautical Mile (the west side of Woodcleft Canal) the first weekend in June each year, which attracts many people from across Long Island and New York City. The Nautical Mile is a strip along the water that features well-known seafood restaurants, crab shacks, bars, eclectic little boutiques, fresh fish markets, as well as party cruise ships and casino boats that float atop the canals. People line up for the boat rides and eat at restaurants that feature seating on the water's edge and servings of mussels, oysters, crabs, and steamed clams ("steamers") accompanied by pitchers of beer. The Sea Breeze waterfront park—which includes a transient marina, boardwalk, rest rooms and benches—opened in 2009 at the foot of the Nautical Mile. It has proven to be a very popular spot to sit and watch the marine traffic and natural scenery. This is in addition to an existing scenic pier.

Freeport has an ethnically and racially diverse population. There is one housing project, named after Nassau County's first black judge, Moxie Rigby. Freeport's Hispanic community is made up of Puerto Ricans, Dominicans, Mexicans, Colombians and other Latin American countries. Among the many Latin-American-themed businesses are several grocery stores or "bodegas" and restaurants along Merrick Road and Main Street that serve Caribbean, Central American, Dominican, and South American cuisines.

Freeport, along with neighboring Merrick, is also the gateway to Jones Beach, one of the largest state beaches in New York. One famous area is the Town of Hempstead Marina, where people from all over Long Island dock their boats. Freeport is a 45-minute ride by the Long Island Rail Road to Manhattan, making the trip an easy commute to New York City.

From 1974 to 1986, Freeport was one of the few Long Island towns to hold a sizeable open-air market area, known as the Freeport Mall. The heart of the Main Street business area was closed to vehicular traffic and reconfigured for pedestrians only. The experiment was not a success. The W. T. Grant store that was supposed to anchor the mall closed, along with the rest of that chain, shortly after the mall opened. The mall area became shabby and disused, and many businesses failed. The mall was dismantled and returned to through traffic with regular parking on each side of the street.

=== Architecture ===
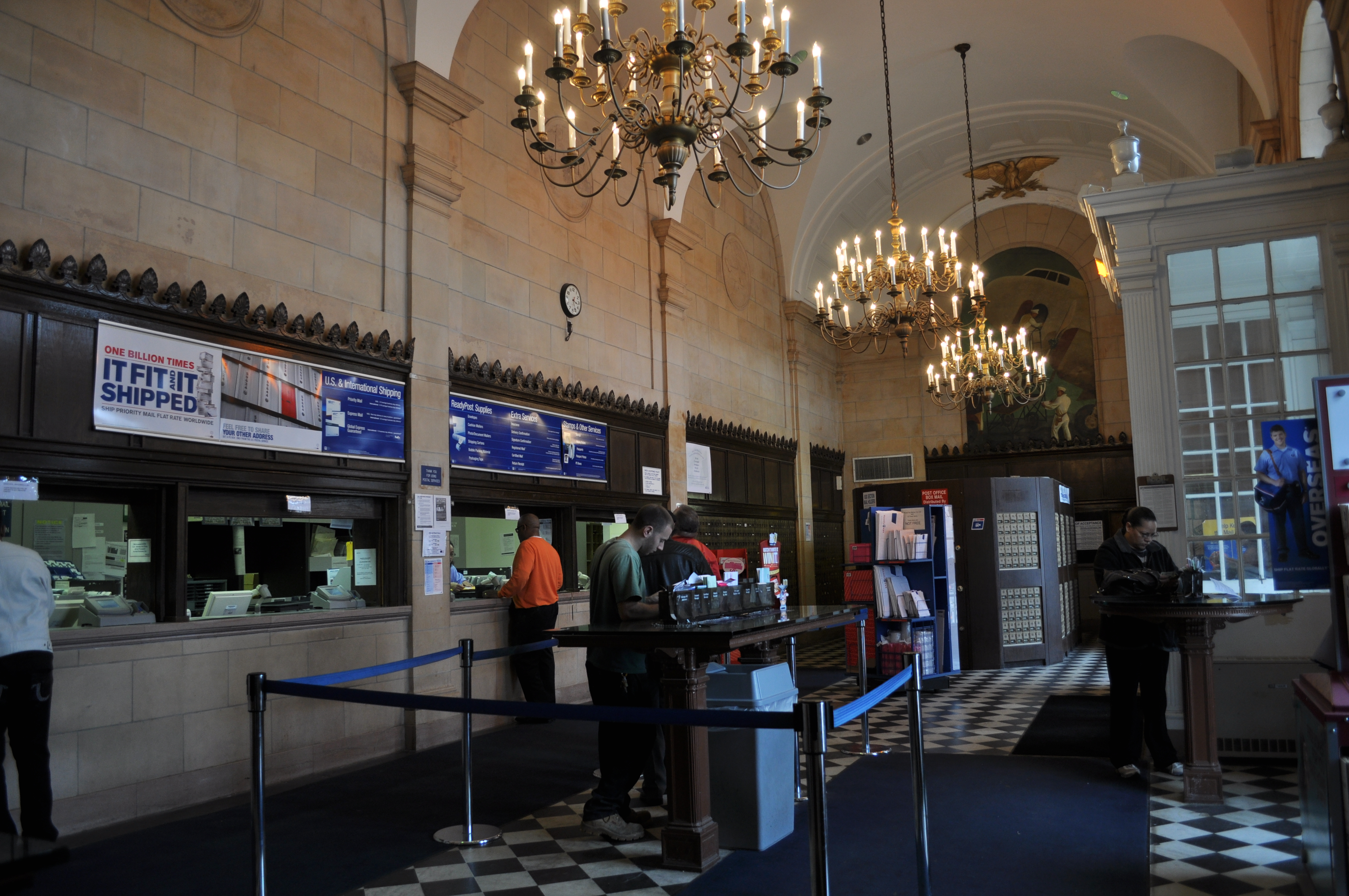
Interior of the Freeport Post Office.

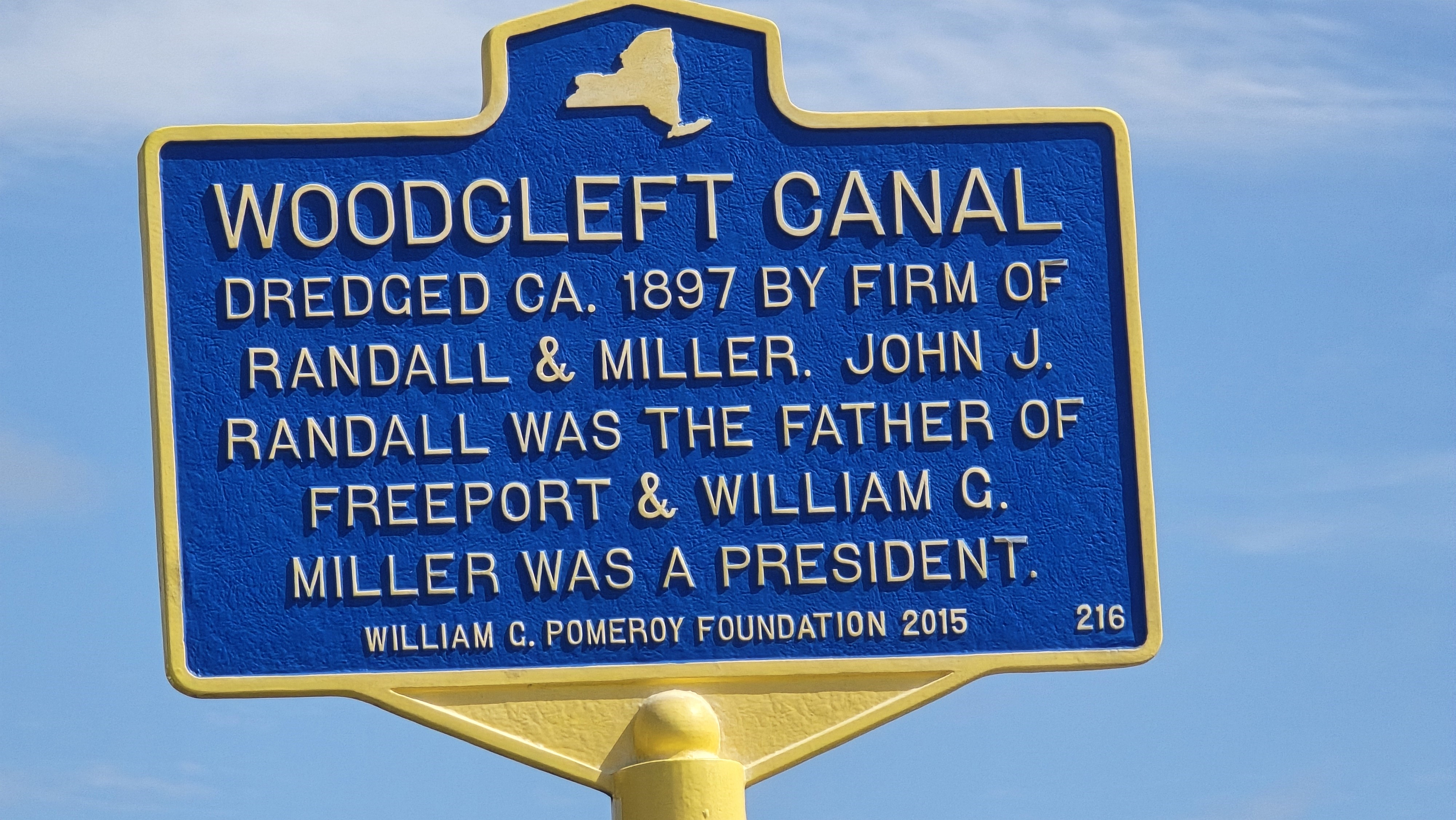
Woodcleft Canal Historic Marker

Just north of the high school and the railroad tracks is the ruin of the former Brooklyn Waterworks, described by Christopher Gray of The New York Times as looking like an "ancient, war-damaged abbey." Designed by architect Frank Freeman and opened in 1891 to serve the City of Brooklyn (later made a borough of New York City), it was fully active until 1929 with a capacity of 54 million gallons a day, and remained in standby for emergency use until 1977, when the pumps and other machinery were removed. See Ridgewood Reservoir. An unsuccessful 1989 plan would have turned the building into condos. The parcel has been the subject of litigation and ongoing investigations by various agencies. Long Island Traditions also describes the sites of notable architecture in Freeport's history, such as bay men's homes and commercial fishing establishments, some of which are still existing, as well as the still-existing Fiore's Fish Market and Two Cousins, which are located in historic waterfront buildings, built by the owners, so they could negotiate directly with the baymen as they pulled into dock.

Long Island Traditions also describes and provides a photograph of the no-longer existing Woodcleft Hotel and important boatyards, about which the site writes:

"In Freeport the Maresca boatyard stands on the site of what is now the Long Island Marine Education Center owned by the Village of Freeport. Founded in the 1920s by Phillip Maresca, they built both recreational and commercial boats. Their customers included Guy Lombardo and party boat captains. The business was taken over by Everett Maresca, who died in 1995. The original building remains relatively intact, consisting of a large concrete block structure. Further down on Woodcleft Canal stands the former Scopinich Boatyard, now part of Shelter Point Marine services. The structure is obscured by corrugated metal siding but elements of its original frame structure remain. The yard was founded by Fred Scopinich, a Greek immigrant in the early 1900s. His grandson Fred moved the yard to East Quogue. The Freeport yard specialized in building commercial fishing boats including trawlers, government boats for the Coast Guard, rum running boats, as well as sailboats and garveys for local baymen. Finally the original Grover boatyard, founded by Al Grover, stands on Woodcleft Avenue a short distance from the Maresca yard. A modest frame building, approximately 20 people worked there. Today the yard is located north of the Nautical Mile on South Main street, run by Grover's sons. Their yard consists of modern corrugated structures used primarily for maintenance and storage."

== Education ==
=== Schools ===
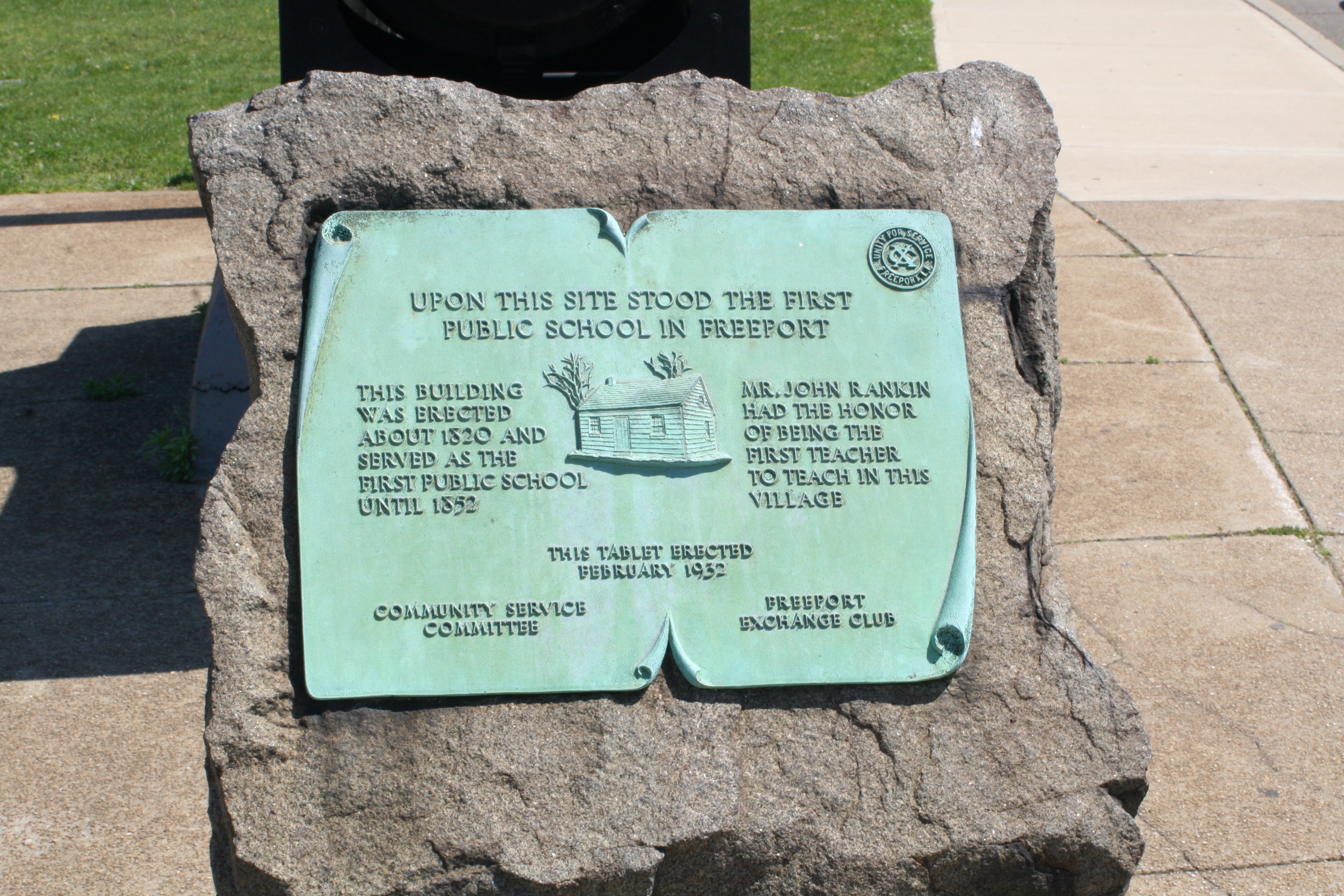
Plaque marking the first public school in Freeport, NY; located at the corner of North Main Street and Church Street, in front of the cannon.

Freeport Public Schools (FPS) operates the community's public schools.

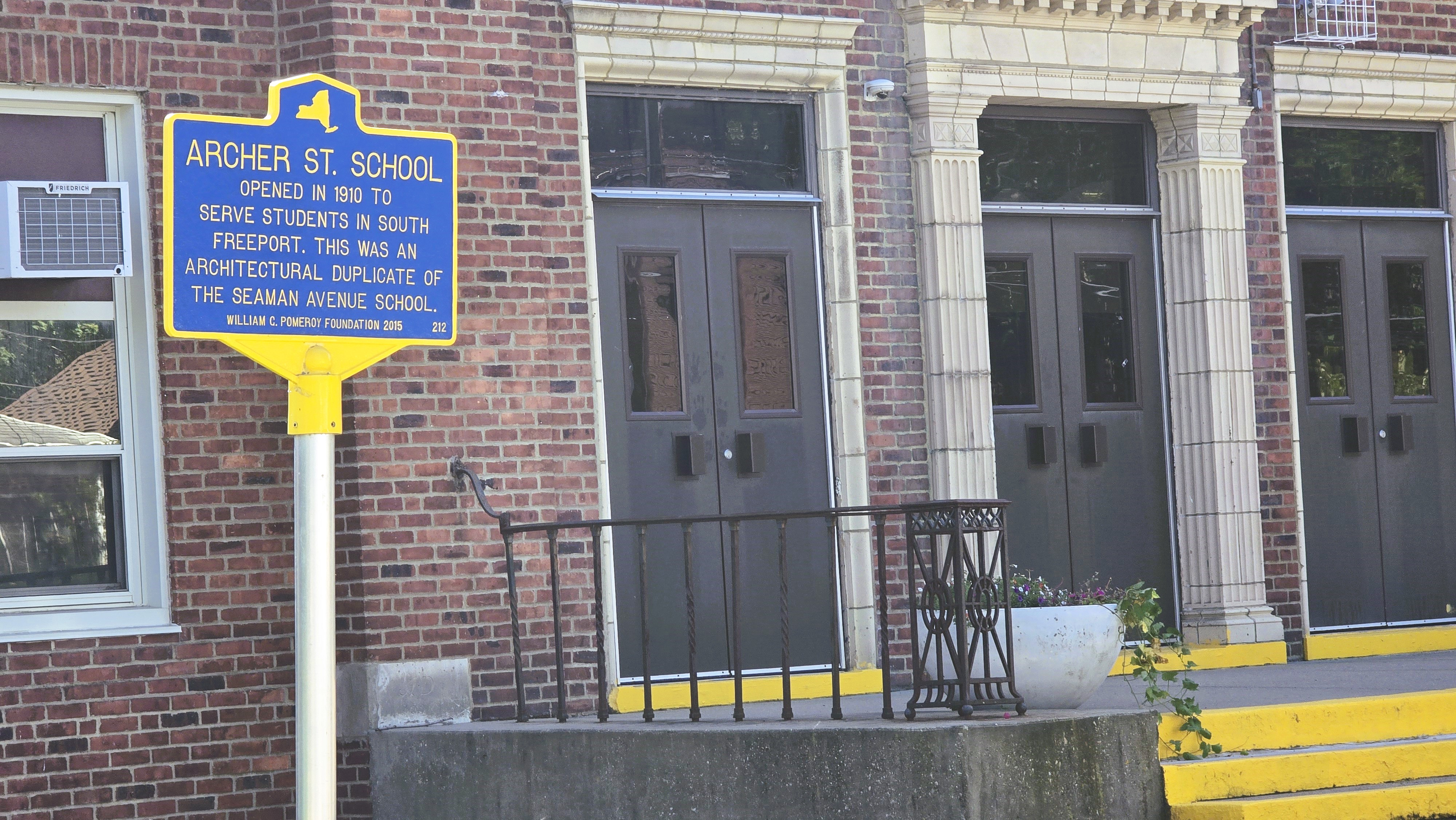
Archer Street School Historic marker

As of the 2023–24 school year, the district, comprising eight schools, had an enrollment of 6,343 students and 527.0 classroom teachers (on an FTE basis), for a student–teacher ratio of 12.0:1. The children of Freeport, in grades 1–4, attend four magnet elementary schools, each with a different specialty: Archer Street (Microsociety and Multimedia), Leo F. Giblyn (School of International Cultures), Bayview Avenue (School of Arts and Sciences), and New Visions (School of Exploration & Discovery). In grades 5 and 6, all public school children attend Caroline G. Atkinson School on the north side of the town. Seventh and 8th graders attend John W. Dodd Middle School. The Middle School is built on the property that housed the older Freeport High School, but not on exactly the same site. The old high school served for some years as the junior high; then the new junior high was built on what was previously parking lot and playground, and the old building was torn down. In 2017, The school remodeled, with an added track and field. A Catholic school, the De La Salle School, is run by the Christian Brothers and accepts boys from grades 5–8.

Children in grades 9–12 attend Freeport High School, which borders the town of Baldwin and sits beside the Milburn duck pond, which is fed by a creek, several hundred yards of which was diverted underground when the high school was built. Freeport High School's mascot is the Red Devil, and its colors are red and white. The school has track-and-field facilities. One unique feature of the school's curriculum is a science research program run in cooperation with Stony Brook University. The school offers numerous advanced placement courses and was a pioneer in distance learning at the high school level. Roughly 87 percent of the high school's graduates go on to some form of higher education. A community night school for teenagers had 236 students as of 1999.

As early as 1886, Freeport's schools began the then-unusual policy of providing their students with free textbooks. In 1893, the newly incorporated village constructed a ten-room brick schoolhouse. Also in the late 19th century, the community was among the first Long Island communities to establish an "academic department", offering classes beyond the elementary school level.

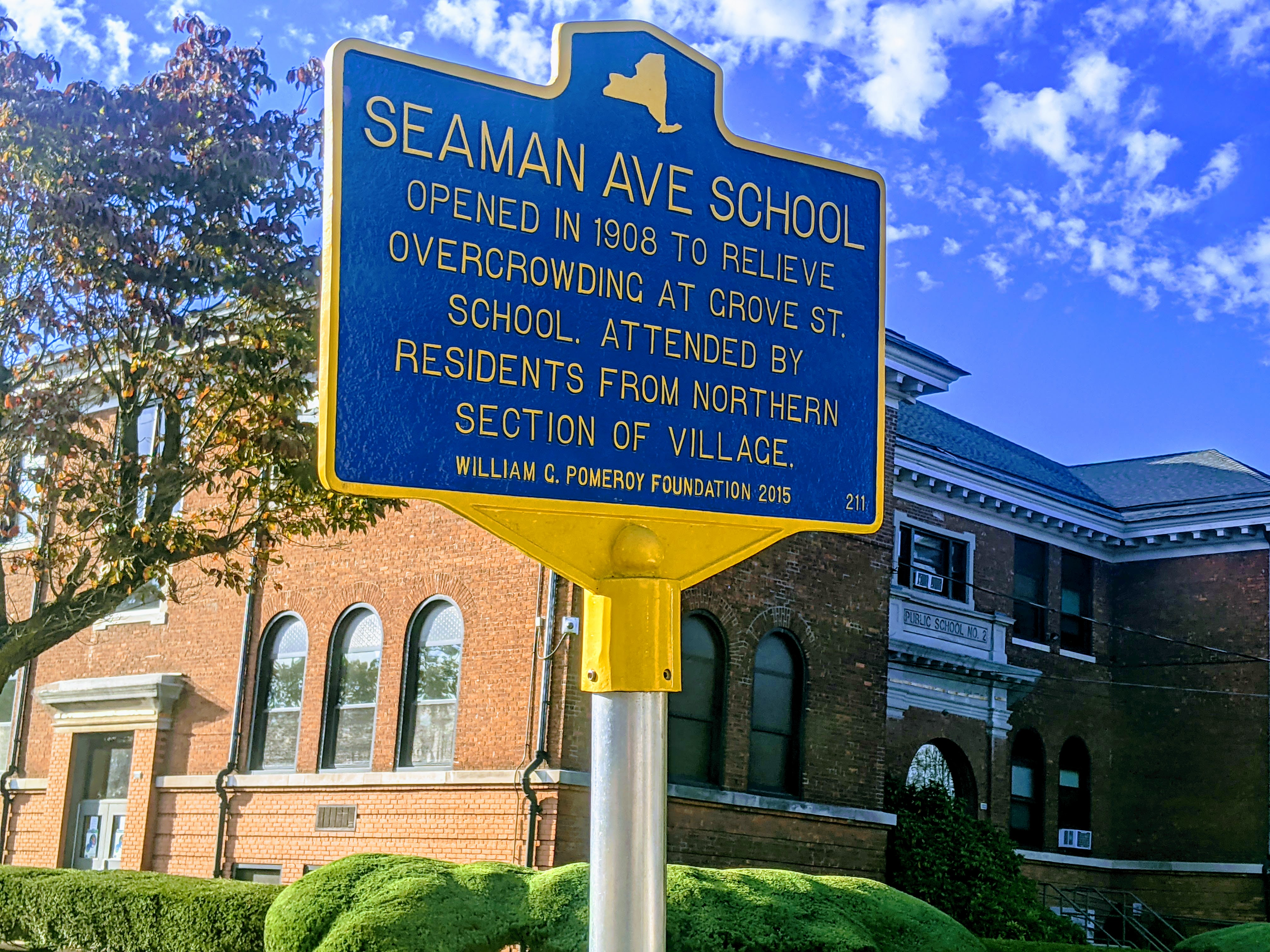
Seaman Ave school #2 historic marker Freeport NY

Freeport saw its share of the social, political, and racial turbulence of the late 1960s and early 1970s. The 1969–70 school year saw three high school principals in the village's only high school, succeeded in August 1970 by William McElroy, formerly the junior high school principal, who came to the position "in the midst of racial tension and a constantly-polarizing student body"; McElroy backed such initiatives as a student advisory committee to the Board of Education and, in his own words, "made [him]self available to any civic-minded group" that wished to discuss with him the situation in the school. By May 1972, he could claim success, of a sort. "Formerly, a fight between a black and a white student would automatically become racial; now a fight is just a fight—between two students."

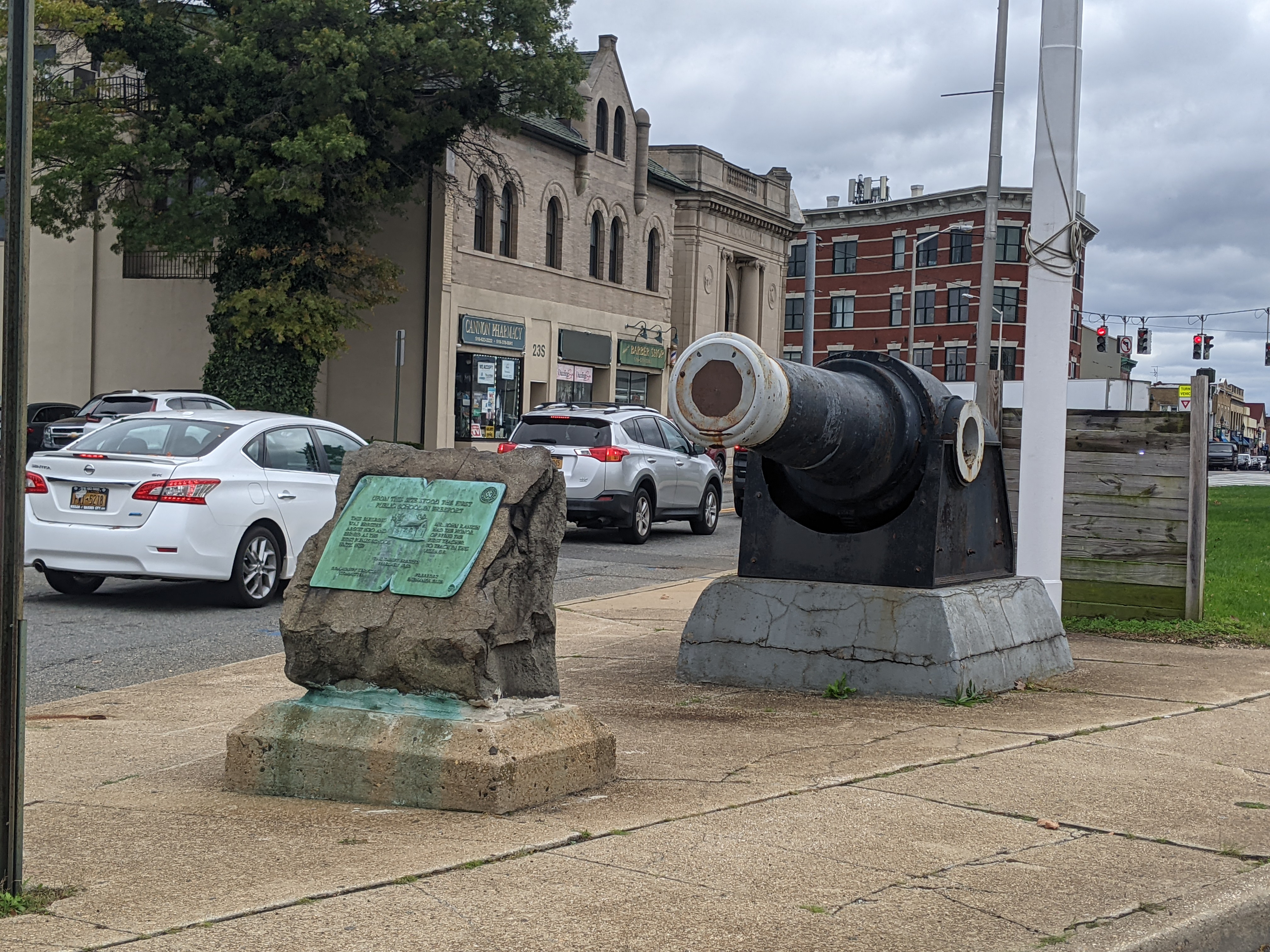
Trubia Rifles & Dedication Plaque

The Freeport High School newspaper, Flashings, founded 1920, is believed to be the oldest high school paper on Long Island. It has won numerous awards over several decades. From 1969 until 1999, it operated under "free press" guidelines unusual for a high school newspaper, with an active role for the students in picking their own faculty adviser and with ultimate editorial control firmly in the hands of students. Throughout that time, Ira Schildkraut functioned as faculty adviser. In 1999, the school administration removed Schildkraut from that role and attempted to establish themselves as censors. That last decision was turned back by the school board after it drew attention from, among others, The New York Times and the Student Press Law Center. However, the dispute's resolution did reduce the student journalists' role in selecting their own faculty adviser and increased the faculty adviser's editorial authority relative to the student journalists'.

From about 1970 to 1973, the town and Freeport High School achieved recognition because of the performance of its math team ("The Mathletes") in regional inter-school math competitions and performance on advanced mathematics tests, including the International Mathematical Olympiad and those from the Mathematical Association of America (MAA).

In addition, in about 1970, Freeport High School became one of the few schools in the country then to have a general purpose computer on the premises dedicated to student use and teaching programming, an IBM 1620 donated by IBM. The 1620 was later replaced by remote access to a DEC System 10 then, later, an on-site PDP-11/40 running the RSTS/E time sharing system, also dedicated to the students. Much credit for the team and computers goes to FHS math teachers and to the Freeport School District's head of Mathematics, Joseph Holbrook.

In June 2008, 16 people were arrested after violence erupted in the high school.

In a 2010 Newsday story regarding Long Island eighth-grader scores on Regents Exams, which have traditionally been given to students in ninth grade and up, Freeport was ranked in the highest tier.

=== Libraries ===
The Freeport Memorial Library, which is the library serving the Freeport Library District, is the main library in Freeport. The Baldwin and Roosevelt Library Districts serve some of the northernmost portions of the village.

== Sports and recreation ==
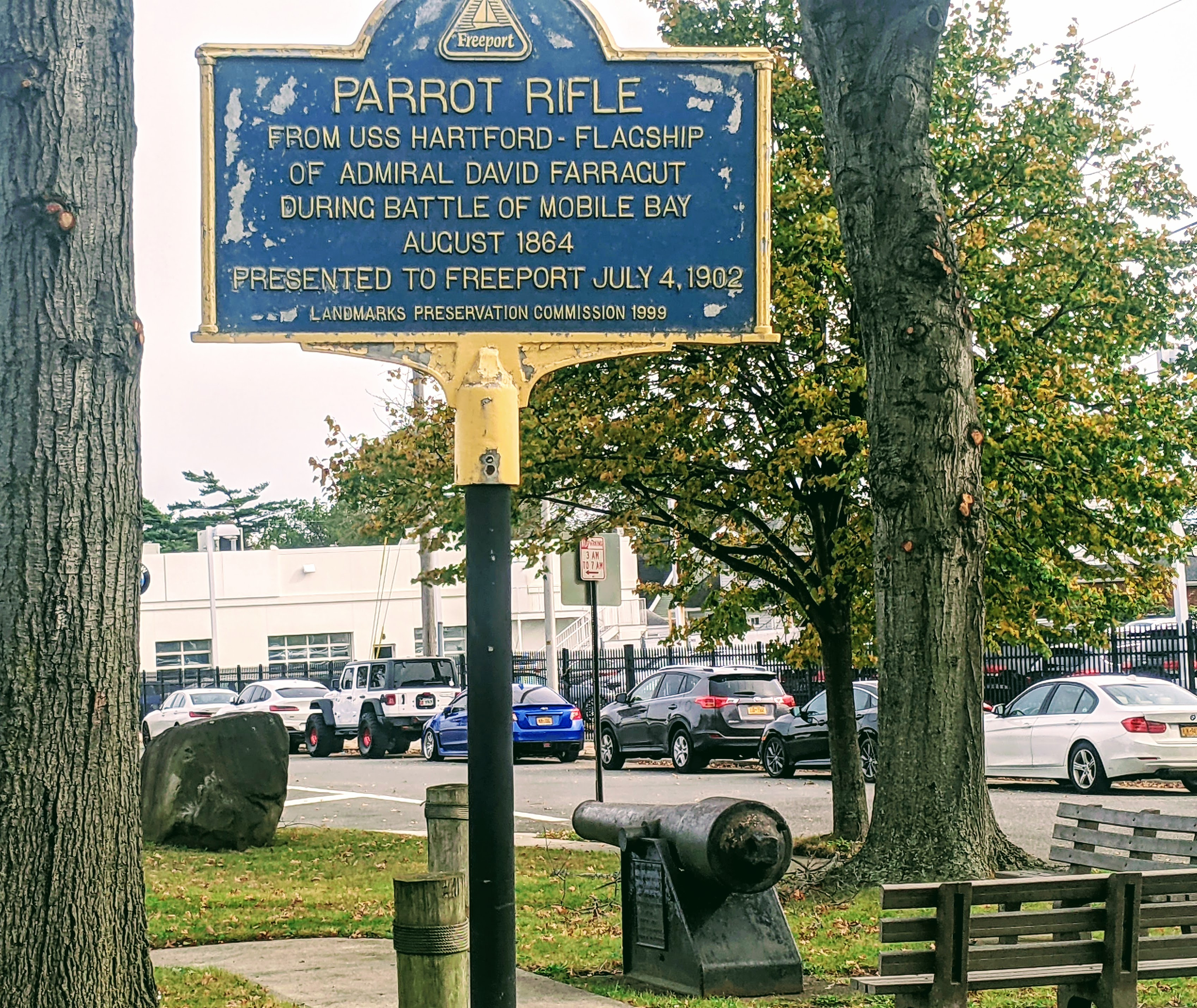
Parrot Rifle of Freeport

In the early 1930s, Freeport was the playing field for the Pennsylvania Red Caps of New York, a semi-pro baseball team which took their name from the caps worn by Pullman porters. For a few years after that, the NFL's Brooklyn Dodgers football team, which, like their baseball namesakes, played at Ebbets Field, using the stadium as a midweek training site. The site is now a Warehouse BJ's Wholesale Club.

From 1931 until the early 1980s, Freeport was home to Freeport Speedway, originally Freeport Municipal Stadium. Seating about 10,000, the stadium originally hosted "midget" auto races; after World War II it switched to stock car racing and eventually demolition derbies. (Note: Geolocation of Freeport Speedway: 40.6515°N 73.5703°W)

Freeport is home to the Freeport Recreation Center, which features an enclosed, year-round ice skating rink; an indoor pool; an outdoor Olympic-size pool; an outdoor diving tank; an outdoor children's pool; handball courts; sauna; steam room; fully equipped workout gyms; basketball courts; and snack bars serving hot and cold foods. The "Rec Center" also offers evening adult classes and hosts a pre-school program, camp programs, and a senior center.

== Infrastructure ==
=== Transportation ===
==== Road ====
Merrick Road and Sunrise Highway both run roughly east-west through the village. Additionally, the Meadowbrook State Parkway forms much of Freeport's eastern border with Merrick. The Southern State Parkway runs east-west about a mile north of Freeport's northern border with Roosevelt.

Additionally, Freeport would have been the southern terminus of the never-built Freeport–Roslyn Expressway. This short-lived proposal in the early 1950s was killed largely by community opposition.

==== Rail ====
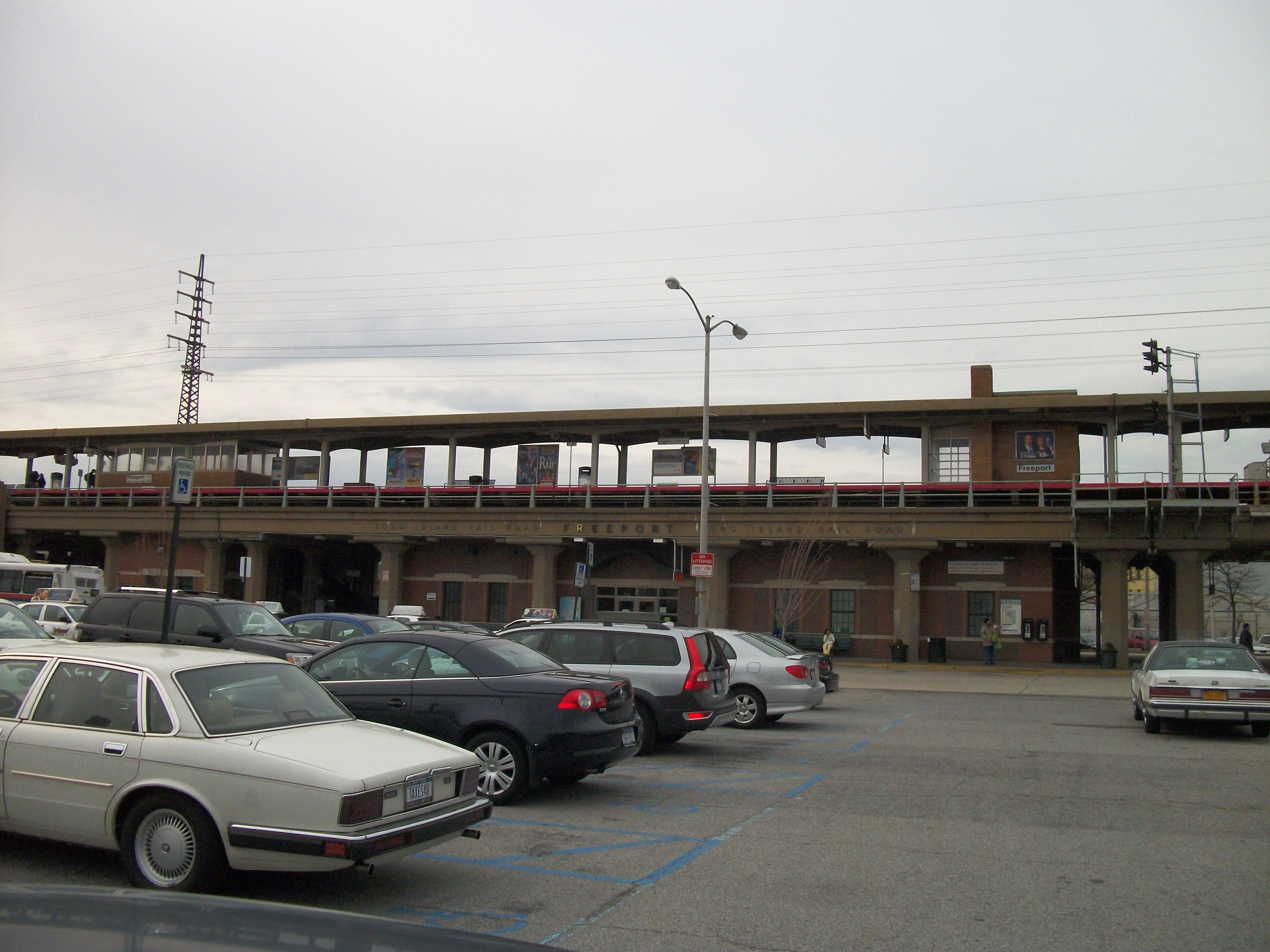
The Freeport LIRR station in 2011

Freeport is served by the Freeport station on the Long Island Rail Road's Babylon Branch.

==== Bus ====
Freeport serves as a hub for several Nassau Inter-County Express bus routes:

- n4/n4x: Freeport – Jamaica
- n19: Freeport – Sunrise Mall
- n40/41: Freeport – Mineola
- n43: Freeport – Roosevelt Field Mall
- n88: Freeport – Jones Beach (Summer Service Only)

=== Utilities ===
==== Sewage ====
Freeport is connected to sanitary sewers. The village maintains a sanitary sewer system which flows into Nassau County's system, which treats the sewage from the village's system through the Nassau County-owned sewage treatment plants.

==== Water ====
The Village of Freeport owns and maintains its own water system. Freeport's water system serves the entire village with water.

== Notable people ==
- Cindy Adams, gossip columnist.
- Desi Barmore (born 1960), American-Israeli basketball player
- Medea Benjamin (born Susan Benjamin), political activist, co-founder of Code Pink
- Leo Carrillo, actor (Pancho in the Cisco Kid series) built a home on Randalls Channel at the corner of Roosevelt and South Long Beach Avenues.
- Broderick Crawford, actor
- Patrick Day, former professional boxer
- Justin Dunn, baseball pitcher drafted in the 2016 Major League Baseball draft
- Chris Edmonds, 1985 NCAA Division 1 Wrestling Champion
- D'Brickashaw Ferguson, Pro Bowl offensive tackle for the New York Jets
- Flavor Flav (William Jonathan Drayton, Jr.), rapper and reality TV star; grew up in Freeport and neighboring Roosevelt
- Kay Gardner, musician, composer, author, and musical producer who lived in Freeport
- George Gollin, an elementary particle physicist and physics professor
- Eddie Gordon, professional mixed martial arts fighter and UFC's TUF winner
- Morlon Greenwood, football player
- Havoc, of hip-hop group Mobb Deep, lives in Freeport
- Gabriel Heatter, radio personality
- Jay Hieron, retired professional mixed martial arts fighter and IFL welterweight champion
- Mitch Kapor, founder of Lotus Development Corporation and the designer of Lotus 1-2-3
- David A. Kessler (born 1951), pediatrician, attorney, author and administrator who served as commissioner of the Food and Drug Administration 1990 to 1997
- Joe Kelly, comic book writer and founder of Man of Action Studios which created Ben 10 and Big Hero 6.
- Erik Larson, author of books such as Isaac's Storm and The Devil in the White City, attended Freeport High School
- Peter Lerangis, author of children's and young-adult fiction; valedictorian of the FHS Class of 1973
- Steve Lieberman, punk rock bassist, flautist, singer signed to JDub Records known as The Gangsta Rabbi; served as Freeport Village Comptroller (1998-2014)
- Guy Lombardo, musician and big bandleader, lived in Freeport during the latter portion of his life; his former residence on South Grove Street (now Guy Lombardo Avenue) included a boathouse where he kept his powerful speed boats, which he raced on the ocean
- Jerry Mackey, former American football linebacker signed by the Tampa Bay Buccaneers
- Charles Manning, international fashion model
- Donnie McClurkin, Grammy Award-winning gospel singer, and founder and pastor of Perfecting Faith Church in Freeport
- Eddie Murphy, attended junior high school at John W. Dodd Middle School
- Billy Murray (singer), Vaudeville-era singer
- Wade Nichols (born Dennis Posa), pornographic actor, cast member in The Edge of Night, and a singer
- Shelly Peiken, songwriter who is best known for co-writing the US #1 hits "What A Girl Wants" and "Come On over Baby" by Christina Aguilera.
- Prodigy, of hip-hop group Mobb Deep, lived in Freeport
- Emanuel Pupulidy (1918—1996), a race car driver
- Lou Reed, singer-songwriter and founding member of The Velvet Underground
- Branch Rickey, owner of the Brooklyn Dodgers
- Dick Schaap, sportswriter, broadcaster, and author
- Samantha Sepulveda, a Long Island police officer who gained fame when the New York Post reported that she is also an Internet glamour model
- Clifton Smith, former American football linebacker who played college football at Syracuse University
- Elinor Smith, 1920s aviator
- Hale Smith, 20th-century composer
- Dee Snider (born 1955), Twisted Sister singer, songwriter, radio personality, and actor
- Susan Sullivan, actress
- Brandon Tartikoff, television executive who grew up in Freeport
- Noel Thompson, National Wrestling Hall of Fame inductee
- Harold E. Varmus, the 1989 recipient of the Nobel Prize in Physiology or Medicine
- Jean R. Yawkey, wife of Boston Red Sox owner Tom Yawkey and owner of the team from his death in 1976 until her own in 1992; grew up in Freeport.
- Michael Zielenziger, journalist and author

== In popular culture ==
- History Alive, season 1, episode 56: "Rumrunners, Moonshiners and Bootleggers" (1995) describes boat making operations and illicit business ventures in Freeport.
- The Sopranos, season 5, episode 8: "Marco Polo" (April 25, 2004) reveals that the crew of Lupertazzi crime family member Jerry Basile operates in Freeport.

== Sources ==
- Bleyer, Bill (June 20, 2009). "Freeport: Action on the Nautical Mile". Newsday.com. Archived from the original on June 20, 2009. .
- Smith, Elinor (1981). Aviatrix. Harcourt Brace Jovanovich. ISBN 0-15-110372-0.
- Smits, Edward J. (1974). Nassau Suburbia, U.S.A.: The First Seventy-five Years of Nassau County, New York, 1899 to 1974. Syosset, New York: Friends of the Nassau County Museum, Distributed by Doubleday. ISBN 0-385-08902-3.
