= 2000 All-Big East Conference football team =

American college football all-star team

The 2000 All-Big East Conference football team consists of American football players chosen as All-Big East Conference players for the 2000 NCAA Division I-A football season. The organizations selecting All-Big East teams in 2000 included the conference's head coaches.

The 2000 Miami Hurricanes led the Big East with an 11–1 record and placed 15 players on the All-Big East team, including 12 spots on the first team. Wide receiver and return specialist Santana Moss received conference honors as both the Big East co-offensive player of the year and special teams player of the year. Linebacker Dan Morgan was named Big East defensive player of the year, and Butch Davis was selected as the Big East coach of the year. Moss, Morgan, safety Ed Reed, offensive guard Joaquin Gonzalez and offensive tackle Bryant McKinnie also received first-team honors on the 2000 All-America college football team.

The Syracuse Orange led the Big East in total defense and placed seven defensive players on the first and second teams. Syracuse's first-team defenders included defensive end Dwight Freeney, linebackers Clifton Smith and Morlon Greenwood, and cornerback Will Allen.

Virginia Tech placed four players on the first team: co-offensive player of the year Lee Suggs, offensive tackle Dave Kadela, defensive lineman David Pugh, and linebacker Ben Taylor. Michael Vick, who was the first-team quarterback in 1999, received seond-team honors.

Boston College had three first-team honorees: running back William Green, offensive guard Paul Zukauskas, and kicker Mike Sutphin.

== Offensive selections ==
=== Quarterbacks ===
- Ken Dorsey, Miami (Coaches-1)
- Michael Vick, Virginia Tech (Coaches-2)

=== Running backs ===
- Lee Suggs, Virginia Tech (Coaches-1)
- William Green, Boston College (Coaches-1)
- James Jackson, Miami (Coaches-2)
- Avon Cobourne, West Virginia (Coaches-2)

=== Wide receivers ===
- Santana Moss, Miami (Coaches-1)
- Antonio Bryant, Pitt (Coaches-1)
- Reggie Wayne, Miami (Coaches-2)
- Khori Ivy, West Virginia (Coaches-2)

=== Tight ends ===
- Jeremy Shockey, Miami (Coaches-1)
- Browning Wynn, Virginia Tech (Coaches-2)
- Robert Ellis, Boston College (Coaches-2)

=== Offensive tackles ===
- Dave Kadela, Virginia Tech (Coaches-1)
- Bryant McKinnie, Miami (Coaches-1)
- Matt Lehr, Virginia Tech (Coaches-2)
- Michael Cook, Boston College (Coaches-2)

=== Offensive guard ===
- Joaquin Gonzalez, Miami (Coaches-1)
- Paul Zukauskas, Boston College (Coaches-1)
- Paul LaQuerre, Boston College (Coaches-2)
- Rich Mazza, Rutgers (Coaches-2)

=== Centers ===
- Jeff McCurley, Pitt (Coaches-1)
- Dan Koppen, Boston College (Coaches-2)

== Defensive selections ==
=== Defensive line ===
- Damione Lewis, Miami (Coaches-1)
- Dwight Freeney, Syracuse (Coaches-1)
- David Pugh, Virginia Tech (Coaches-1)
- Bryan Knight, Pitt (Coaches-1)
- Duke Pettijohn, Syracuse (Coaches-2)
- Russell Newman, Temple (Coaches-2)
- Chad Beasley, Virginia Tech (Coaches-2)
- Eric Downing, Syracuse (Coaches-2)
- Rickie Simpkins, Syracuse (Coaches-2)

=== Linebackers ===
- Dan Morgan, Miami (Coaches-1)
- Morlon Greenwood, Syracuse (Coaches-1)
- Clifton Smith, Syracuse (Coaches-1)
- Ben Taylor, Virginia Tech (Coaches-1)
- Gerald Hayes, Pitt (Coaches-2)
- LeVar Talley, Temple (Coaches-2)
- Wesley Robertson, Rutgers (Coaches-2)

=== Cornerbacks ===
- Will Allen, Syracuse (Coaches-1)
- Mike Rumph, Miami (Coaches-1)
- Leonard Myers, Miami (Coaches-2)
- Ronyell Whitaker, Virginia Tech (Coaches-2)

=== Safeties ===
- Ed Reed, Miami (Coaches-1)
- Al Blades, Miami (Coaches-1)
- Ramon Walker, Pitt (Coaches-2)
- Cory Bird, Virginia Tech (Coaches-2)

== Special teams ==
=== Kickers ===
- Mike Sutphin, Boston College (Coaches-1)
- Carter Warley, Virginia Tech (Coaches-2)

=== Punters ===
- Freddie Capshaw, Miami (Coaches-1)
- Mark Fazzolori, West Virginia (Coaches-2)

=== Return specialist ===
- Santana Moss, Miami (Coaches-1)
- Andre Davis, Virginia Tech (Coaches-2)

== Individual awards ==
- Offensive players of the year: Antonio Bryant, PItt; Santana Moss, Miami; Lee Suggs, Virginia Tech
- Defensive player of the year: Dan Morgan, Miami
- Special teams player of the year: Santana Moss, Miami
- Rookie of the year: Grant Wiley, West Virginia
- Coach of the year: Butch Davis, Miami

== Key ==
Coaches, selected by the conference coaches

== See also ==
- 2000 All-America college football team
