= Albert Heinrich =

Albert Heinrich may refer to:

- Prince Albert of Saxe-Altenburg (1843–1902), German prince
- Albert Heinrich, a.k.a. Cyborg 004, fictional character in Cyborg 009#00 Cyborgs anime
- Albert S. Heinrich (1888–1974), American aviator and designer

== See also ==
- Heinrich Albert (composer) (1604–1651), German composer and poet
- Heinrich Albert (guitarist) (1870–1950), German guitarist and composer
