= Freeport Public Schools =

School district in New York, United States

Freeport Union Free School District
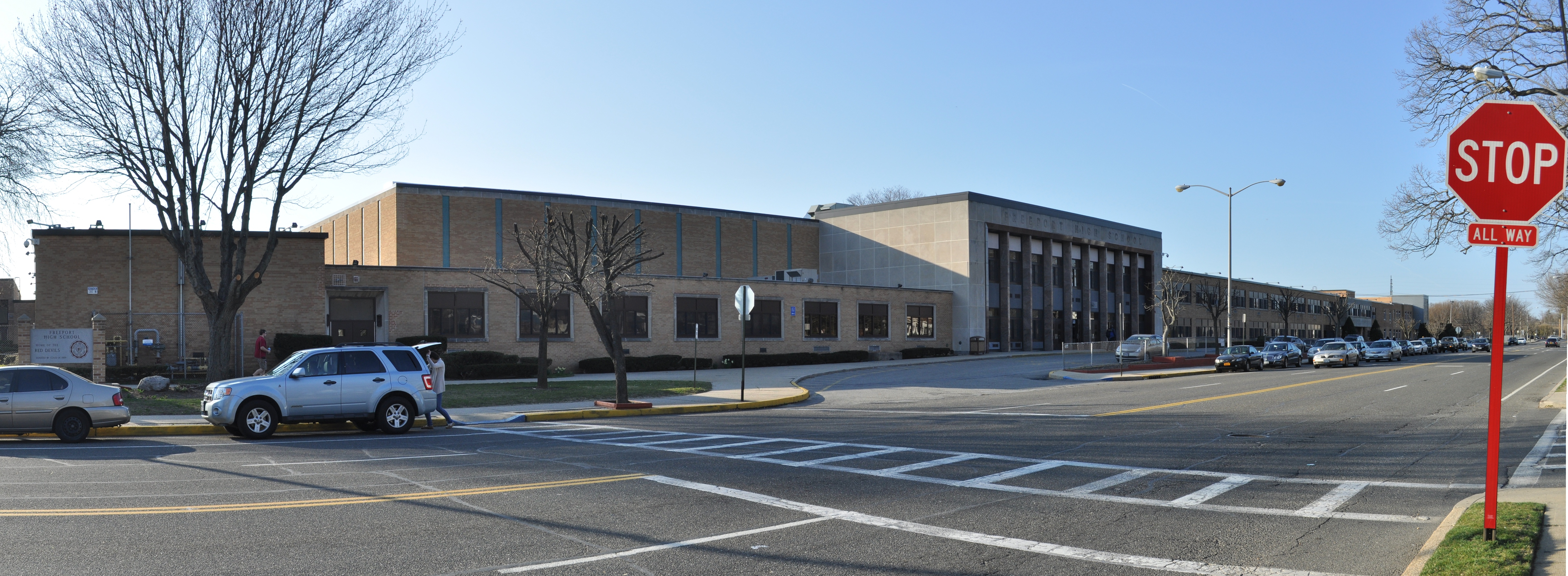
- The front of Freeport High School, as seen from the street.

Address
- 50 South Brookside Avenue Freeport, New York; United States
- Coordinates: 40°39′52.5″N 73°35′21″W

District information
- Type: Public
- Established: circa 1820
- Schools: 8

Students and staff
- Enrollment: 6,343 (as of 2023–24)
- Faculty: 527.0 FTEs
- Student–teacher ratio: 12.0:1

Other information
- Website: www.freeportschools.org

Freeport Public Schools (FPS) is a public school district on Long Island, serving the community of Freeport, New York.

As of the 2023–24 school year, the district, comprising eight schools, had an enrollment of 6,343 students and 527.0 classroom teachers (on an FTE basis), for a student–teacher ratio of 12.0:1.

== History ==
Freeport's public education system dates from circa 1820; by 1853, the system had over 200 students. In 1890 it became a Union Free School District and in 1892, when the Village of Freeport was incorporated, there were 528 students. The next year the wooden schoolhouse (the village's second) burned, and was replaced by their first brick schoolhouse; that building at the corner of Pine and Grove Streets opened March 9, 1894. 1894 also saw the system's first kindergarten, but an 1895 count shows enrollment down to 445.

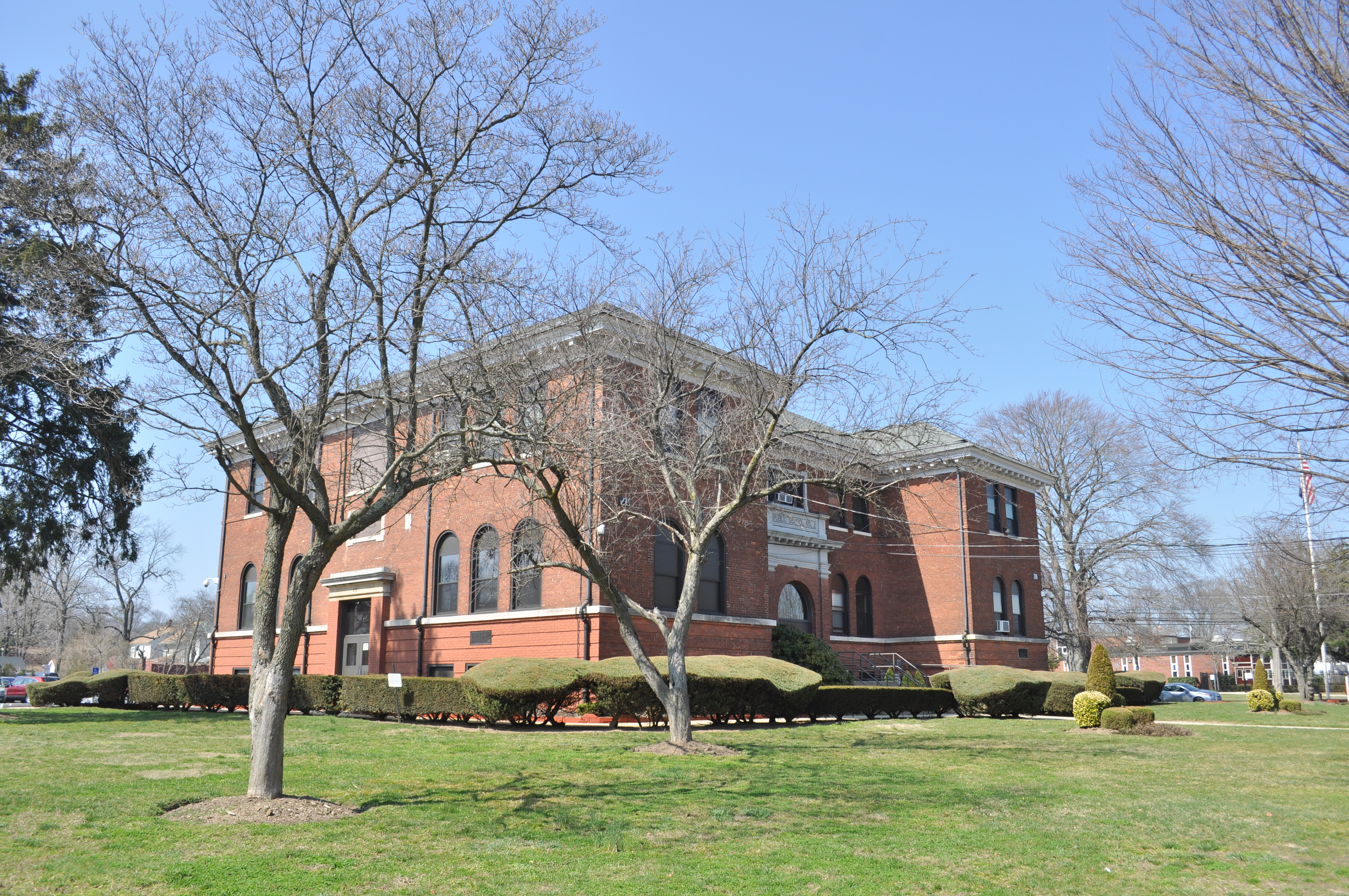
The school administration building at the corner of Ocean and Seaman Avenues was originally Public School No. 2, built in 1907. That name can still be seen over the door in this photo.

Freeport High School was founded as part of the system in 1899 and graduated its first class in 1901. The class of 1905 adopted the school colors, red and white. In 1907, a second school building was built at the corner of Ocean and Seaman Avenues, and Archer Street School, still a K-4 school in the 2020s opened in 1909, followed by the Columbus Avenue School in 1915.

1918 saw school district's first female board member, Agnes Earon, and the advent of vocational education, with a night school teaching boatbuilding. Three years later, another innovation was Saturday "continuation classes" for 14- and 15-year-olds who were already in the workforce.

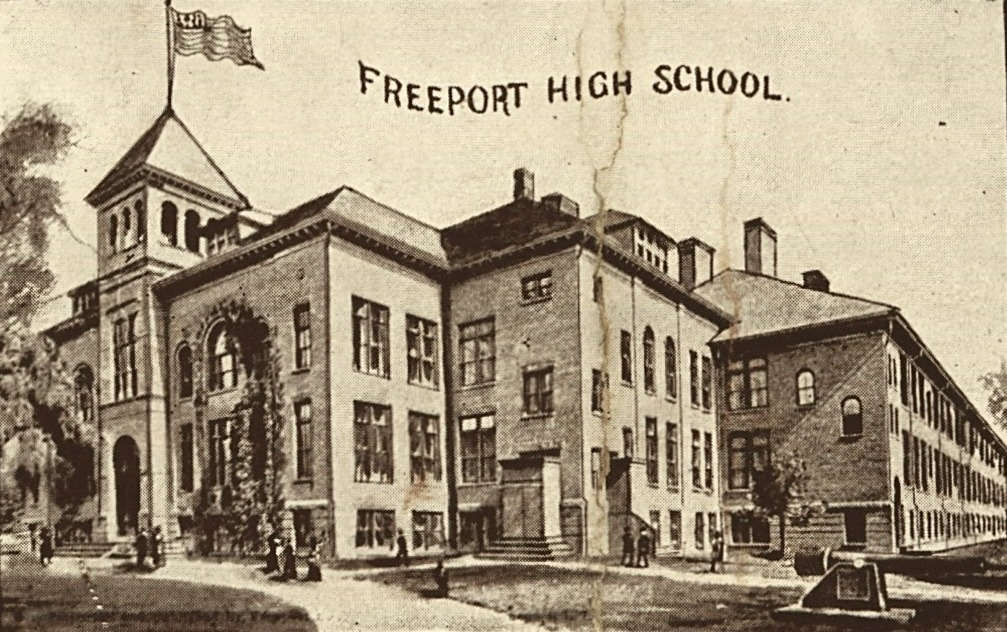
This school building, built 1894 and shown here as the district's high school in a 1909 drawing or etching, can be seen at the corner of Pine and Grove just right of center in this 1909 birds-eye view of Freeport. It served several different purposes, the last being as a recreation center, before succumbing to a fire in 1966; Part of the fire-damaged building can be seen here.

A new high school was constructed immediately east of the old one in 1922–1925. 1925 was also the beginning of John W. Dodd's tenure as superintendent of Freeport schools; he would serve in that office until 1961. Another longstanding figure in the school system was Leo F. Giblyn, a World War I veteran who served on the Board of Education from July 1, 1932, until his death on December 19, 1960; from July 1, 1940, onward he was board president. In 1962, an elementary school was named in his honor.

A 1928 directory of the school system shows a five-member Board of Education with three distinct committees, meeting twice a month. Adele Miller is listed both as clerk to the Board and secretary to Superintendent Dodd. There is an attendance officer, a medical inspector, a school nurse, and a building superintendent. Thirteen individuals, the majority female, are identified as "supervisors and special teachers," supervising areas ranging from the arts to sewing to sheet metal work.

The following schools are shown at that date: a high school with 41 teachers, including Caroline G. Atkinson, an English teacher who, after her death in 1949, would have an elementary school named after her; Grove Street School; Seaman Avenue School (the old Public School No. 2, also known as Washington School); Archer Street School(originally Lincoln School); and Columbus Avenue School.

The directory also lists numerous annual prizes to honor civic, academic, and artistic achievements by students of various ages, as well as numerous competitive college scholarships, many of which are allocated by Assembly District rather than being specific to Freeport. A scholarship to Princeton University is to be awarded annually to "candidates from the Schools of Nassau County, N. Y., preferably those of Freeport, N. Y." High school students are separated into grades based on the number of credits completed rather than by age and, "No credit my be allowed for graduation for less than two full years of a foreign language." Allowance is made to grant a high school diploma to a student "regularly and faithfully pursued [a required] subject for full double time and has been present 90 percent of the time" but still has not been able to achieve a passing grade.

The community kept growing. In 1931, the Cleveland Avenue School opened and the Columbus Avenue School was enlarged. By 1937, Freeport's population exceeded 20,000, and it was the largest "village" in Nassau County. In 1941, there were 1,779 students in seventh grade or higher. The Atkinson School was added in 1949 and the Bayview Avenue School in 1953. Also in 1959, the Long Island Park Commission handed over 9 acres (3.6 hectares) just north of the Cleveland Avenue School to be used as a high school athletic fields; the Buffalo Avenue Field House there was added in 1952.

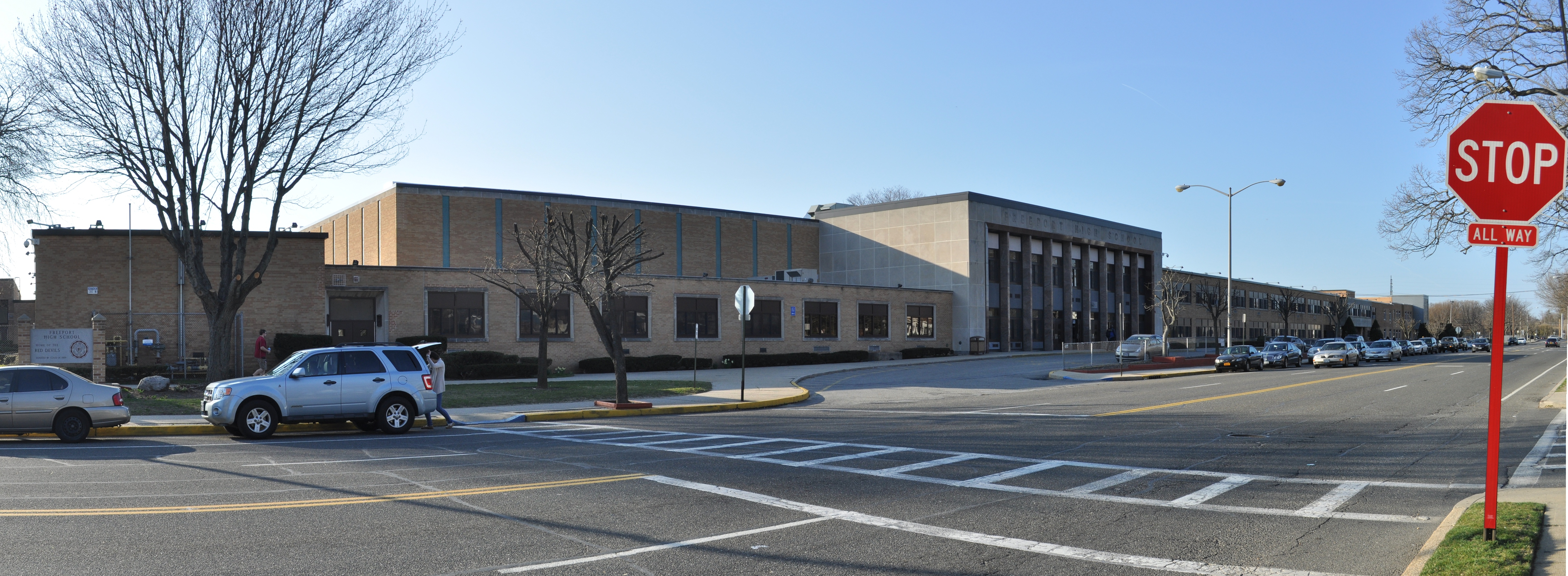
The current Freeport High School, photographed in 2012, including 1969 addition at right.

The early 1960s saw considerable infrastructural change. The current Freeport High School was built on marshy land on the west edge of Freeport along the border with Baldwin; it was dedicated on November 6, 1960. The old high school building was officially re-dedicated April 30, 1961 as John W. Dodd Jr. High School; (later John W. Dodd Middle School) Dodd retired as superintendent that year. The Giblyn elementary school opened in 1962; the Cleveland Avenue School closed in 1963 (later to reopen as a vocational school); and the old Seaman Avenue School (P.S. 2) was converted in 1964 to an administration building. The Archer Street School was renovated in 1965. During the renovations, first and second grade classes were held in a Presbyterian church, over the objections of a local Jewish group.

== Present-day schools ==
=== Secondary ===
- Freeport High School (grades 9–12)
- John W. Dodd Middle School (grades 7–8)

=== Primary ===
- Caroline G. Atkinson Intermediate School (grades 5–6)
- Leo F Giblyn School (grades K-4)
  - The two-story school was constructed in 1909 and received additional area in 1969 and 2000; the latest expansion consisted of an extra wing
- Bayview Avenue School of Arts & Sciences (grades K-4)
- Archer Street School (grades K-4)
- New Visions School of Discovery and Exploration (grades K-4) - magnet school

=== Preschool and Kindergarten ===
- Columbus Avenue School
