= Noel Thompson (wrestler) =

African American wrestler

Noel Thompson competed for Freeport High School on Long Island, where he was an undefeated state champion in 1998. He earned All-American honors at the USA Wrestling Junior Nationals, and was also a folkstyle national All-American. He wrestled for respected coach Terry Haise in high school.

College Graduate from Hofstra University in 2004 with a degree in marketing. He wrestled for four years and was a three-time team captain. He was a four-time NCAA qualifier ‒ making the All-American Round three times ‒ and amassed 130 career wins. Thompson was awarded the Howdy Myers Award as Hofstra's Outstanding Male Athlete. He was inducted into the Wrestling Hall Of Fame in 2014.

He became the first African-American to serve in the role of Team Leader for the U.S. Women's program, and has been a leading advocate for providing opportunities for all to wrestle throughout his career.
