= Clifton Smith (linebacker) =

American football player (born 1980)

No. 51, 59, 50, 30
- Position: Linebacker/Fullback

Personal information
- Born: July 21, 1980 (age 46); Freeport, New York, U.S.
- Listed height: 6 ft 2 in (1.88 m)
- Listed weight: 250 lb (113 kg)

Career information
- High school: Freeport
- College: Syracuse
- NFL draft: 2003: undrafted

Career history
- Washington Redskins (2003–2004); Cleveland Browns (2005–2006); → Cologne Centurions (2007); Philadelphia Soul (2008); Chicago Rush (2010); Philadelphia Soul (2012)

Awards and highlights
- ArenaBowl champion (2008); 2× First-team All-Big East (2000–2001); Second-team All-Big East (2002)

Career NFL statistics
- Total tackles: 1
- Stats at Pro Football Reference
- Stats at ArenaFan.com

Clifton M. Smith II (born July 21, 1980) is an American former professional football player who was a linebacker in the National Football League (NFL) and Arena Football League (AFL). He played college football at Syracuse. He signed with the NFL's Washington Redskins as an undrafted free agent in 2003.

== Early life ==
Smith played high school football at Freeport High School in Freeport, New York. He was named the USA Today New York State Player of the Year. He also participated in basketball and track in high school.

== College career ==
Smith played college football for the Syracuse Orange from 1999 to 2002. He played in 11 games, starting eight, his freshman year in 1999, recording 37 solo tackles, 29 assisted tackles and one sack, earning The Sporting News first-team Freshman All-American honors. He started all 11 games in 2000, accumulating 61 solo tackles, 47 assisted tackles, three forced fumbles and one fumble recovery, garnering first-team All-Big East and first-team All-ECAC recognition.

Smith start all 13 games his junior season in 2001, totaling 57 solo tackles, 37 assisted tackles and three sacks, earning first-team All-Big East and first-team All-ECAC honors for the second consecutive year. He was also named the Defensive MVP of the 2001 Insight.com Bowl after accumulating 12 tackles (six solo), two sacks and one forced fumble. He started all 12 games his senior year in 2002, recording 89 solo tackles, 48 assisted tackles, two sacks, one interception and one fumble recovery, garnering second-team All-Big East accolades. Smith led the Big East that year in tackles per game with 11.4.

Smith played in 47 games, starting 44, during his college career, recording 244 solo tackles, 161 assisted tackles, six sacks, three forced fumbles, two fumble recoveries and one interception. His 36 career tackles for loss set the school record for linebackers. He was part of the North team at the 2003 Senior Bowl.

== Professional career ==
=== Washington Redskins ===
Smith signed with the Washington Redskins on May 2, 2003, after going undrafted in the 2003 NFL draft. He was waived on August 31 and signed to the team's practice squad on September 2. He was promoted to the active roster on December 10 and played in one game during the 2003 season, recording one assisted tackle. Smith was waived on September 6, 2004, and signed to the practice squad on September 9, 2004. He re-signed with the Redskins on February 10, 2005. He was waived on August 29, 2005.

=== Cleveland Browns ===
Smith was signed to the practice squad of the Cleveland Browns on October 25, 2005. He signed a reserve/future contract with the Browns on January 2, 2006. He was waived/injured on September 2 and reverted to injured reserve the next day. Smith was waived by the Browns on September 4, 2006.

He later re-signed with the Browns on December 19, 2006, and played in one game for the Browns during the 2006 season but recorded no statistics. He was allocated to NFL Europa in 2007, where he played for the Cologne Centurions during the 2007 NFL Europa season. Smith started all 10 games for the Centurions in 2007, totaling 43 tackles, one forced fumble, three interceptions and five pass breakups. He was waived by the Browns on September 1, 2007.

=== Philadelphia Soul (first stint) ===
Smith signed with the Philadelphia Soul of the Arena Football League (AFL) on January 11, 2008. He was a fullback / linebacker for the Soul. He rushed 50 times for 131 yards and 10 touchdowns on offense. On defense, he recorded 33 solo tackles, 24 assisted tackles, one sack, one forced fumble, one fumble recovery, one interception and one pass breakup. The Soul won ArenaBowl XXII that season.

=== Chicago Rush ===
Smith was assigned to the Chicago Rush of the AFL on February 19, 2010. He rushed seven times for 22 yards and five touchdowns. He also recorded 18 solo tackles, 12 assisted tackles, 4.5 sacks, two forced fumbles, one fumble recovery, three pass breakups and one blocked kick.

=== Philadelphia Soul (second stint) ===
Smith was assigned to the Soul on December 29, 2011. He was placed on refuse to report on February 24, 2012.
