= D'Brickashaw Ferguson =

American football player (born 1983)

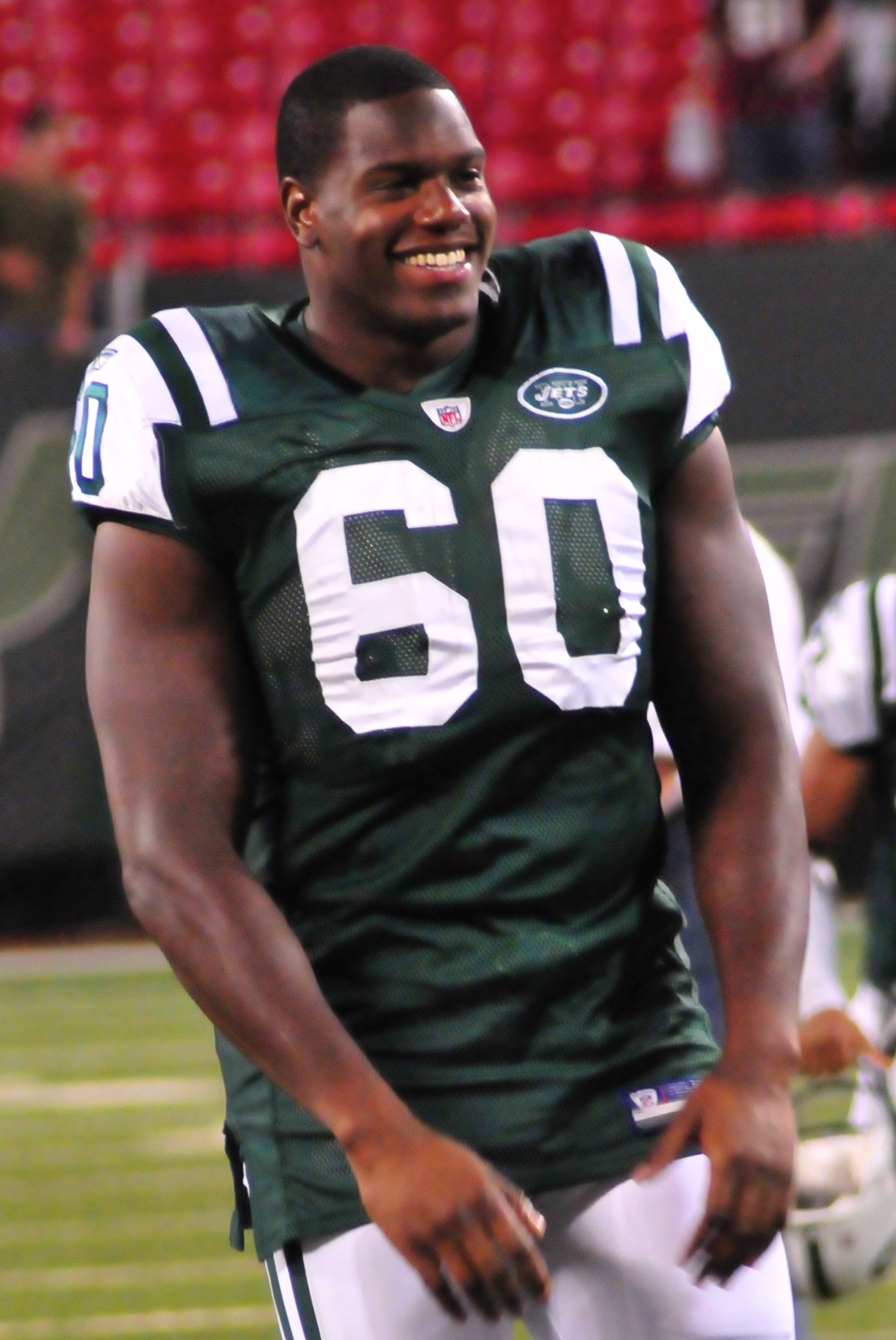
- Ferguson with the New York Jets in 2009

No. 60
- Position: Offensive tackle

Personal information
- Born: December 10, 1983 (age 42); New York City, New York, U.S.
- Listed height: 6 ft 6 in (1.98 m)
- Listed weight: 310 lb (141 kg)

Career information
- High school: Freeport (Freeport, New York)
- College: Virginia (2002–2005)
- NFL draft: 2006: 1st round, 4th overall pick

Career history
- New York Jets (2006–2015)

Awards and highlights
- 3× Pro Bowl (2009–2011); PFWA NFL All-Rookie Team (2006); New York Jets Ring of Honor; First-team All-American (2005); 2× First-team All-ACC (2004, 2005); Virginia Cavaliers Jersey No. 66 retired

Career NFL statistics
- Games played: 160
- Games started: 160
- Fumble recoveries: 4
- Stats at Pro Football Reference

D'Brickashaw Montgomery Ferguson (born December 10, 1983) is an American former professional football player who was an offensive tackle for 10 seasons with the New York Jets of the National Football League (NFL). He played college football for the Virginia Cavaliers and received first-team All-American honors. He was picked by the Jets fourth overall in the 2006 NFL draft, and was selected for the Pro Bowl three times. Ferguson made 160 consecutive regular season starts and never missed a game in his entire career.

== Early life ==
Ferguson's given name was inspired by Father Ralph de Bricassart, a character in the 1977 novel The Thorn Birds. He attended Freeport High School in the Long Island village of Freeport, New York. He nearly gave up football during his freshman year in high school.

Considered a three-star recruit by Rivals.com, Ferguson was ranked as the No. 29 offensive guard prospect in the nation. He chose to attend the University of Virginia over Michigan State.

== College career ==
While attending the University of Virginia, Ferguson played for the Virginia Cavaliers football team. He started his college career listed at 260 pounds (118 kg), often dropping to 245 pounds (111 kg) through the regular season. He started 49 games for the Cavaliers, and he was named to the All-American first-team during his final season. He was placed on the all-Atlantic Coast Conference first-team two years in a row, and he became Virginia's first All-ACC offensive tackle since 1998. Ferguson started at left tackle in four consecutive bowl games for the Cavaliers. He played linebacker on a special defensive package employed sparingly in 2003. He did this while earning a religious studies degree in only 3.5 years. He was an All-America selection in 2004 by Pro Football Weekly.

== Professional career ==
Considered an undersized tackle after playing at 295 pounds during his senior year at Virginia, Ferguson officially weighed in at 312 for the NFL Combine. As a tackle, Ferguson's talent is found in his lower body strength, athleticism and flexibility. This athleticism and flexibility is further evidenced in his attaining a black belt in Shotokan karate and brown belt in taekwondo. Adding to that ability is his natural build, as Ferguson has an armspan of 87 inches (221 cm).

Ferguson was one of six players the NFL invited to New York for the 2006 NFL draft events. He was selected 4th overall by the New York Jets. The last time the Jets used their first pick on a tackle was 1988, when they selected Dave Cadigan of USC at No. 8.

Pre-draft measurables
Height	Weight	Arm length	Hand span	40-yard dash	20-yard shuttle	Three-cone drill	Vertical jump	Broad jump
6 ft 6 in (1.98 m)	312 lb (142 kg)	35 1/2 in (0.90 m)	10 in (0.25 m)	5.08 s	4.85 s	7.62 s	30 in (0.76 m)	8 ft 11 in (2.72 m)
All values from NFL Combine/Virginia Pro Day on March 21, 2006

Ferguson was drafted by the New York Jets in the first round with the fourth overall pick of the 2006 NFL draft. On July 26, 2006, Ferguson signed a five-year deal with the team. The deal was similar to the $35 million deal that 2005’s No. 4 pick, Cedric Benson, signed with the Chicago Bears. Designated as Jason Fabini's successor, Ferguson started every game at left tackle for the Jets since the beginning of the 2006 NFL season. On January 8, 2010, Miami Dolphins Tackle Jake Long withdrew from the 2010 Pro Bowl due to injuries and Ferguson was named as his replacement. He was invited to the 2011 Pro Bowl. He was ranked 79th by his fellow players on the NFL Top 100 Players of 2011.

On April 8, 2016, Ferguson announced his retirement from the NFL after 10 seasons, having made 160 consecutive starts and never missing a game. He played 10,707 out of 10,708 regular season offensive snaps in his career. In his retirement statement, Ferguson wrote, "I would like to thank every coach, every teammate, and every fan that has shown me support throughout my career. I sincerely thank you all from the bottom of my heart."

== Personal life ==
Ferguson's hometown of Freeport, New York, dedicated a street to him on September 29, 2009. South Ocean Avenue, where he grew up, received secondary signage as D'Brickashaw Ferguson Way. His father, Ed Ferguson Sr., is a native of Nassau, The Bahamas, and his older brother, Edwin, also graduated from the University of Virginia. He is a black belt in Karate and brown belt in Taekwondo. He is also a Brazilian Jiu-Jitsu blue belt and competes frequently in IBJJF tournaments.

Ferguson was the inspiration for the recurring East–West College Bowl sketch on the Comedy Central sketch comedy series Key & Peele, in which comedians Keegan-Michael Key and Jordan Peele portray football players with uncommon names when introducing themselves. One iteration of the sketch featured real-life football players, including Ferguson himself.

D'Brickashaw and his ex-wife had two children before divorcing in December 2021. He has since welcomed a third child with his current wife, Stephanie, in April 2025.

In May 2025, Ferguson graduated from Jefferson University's nursing program. He pursued nursing to follow in the footsteps of his mother and grandmother, both of whom were nurses.
