= Freeport Memorial Library =

Library in New York, United States

Coordinates: 40.65351°N 73.58673°W

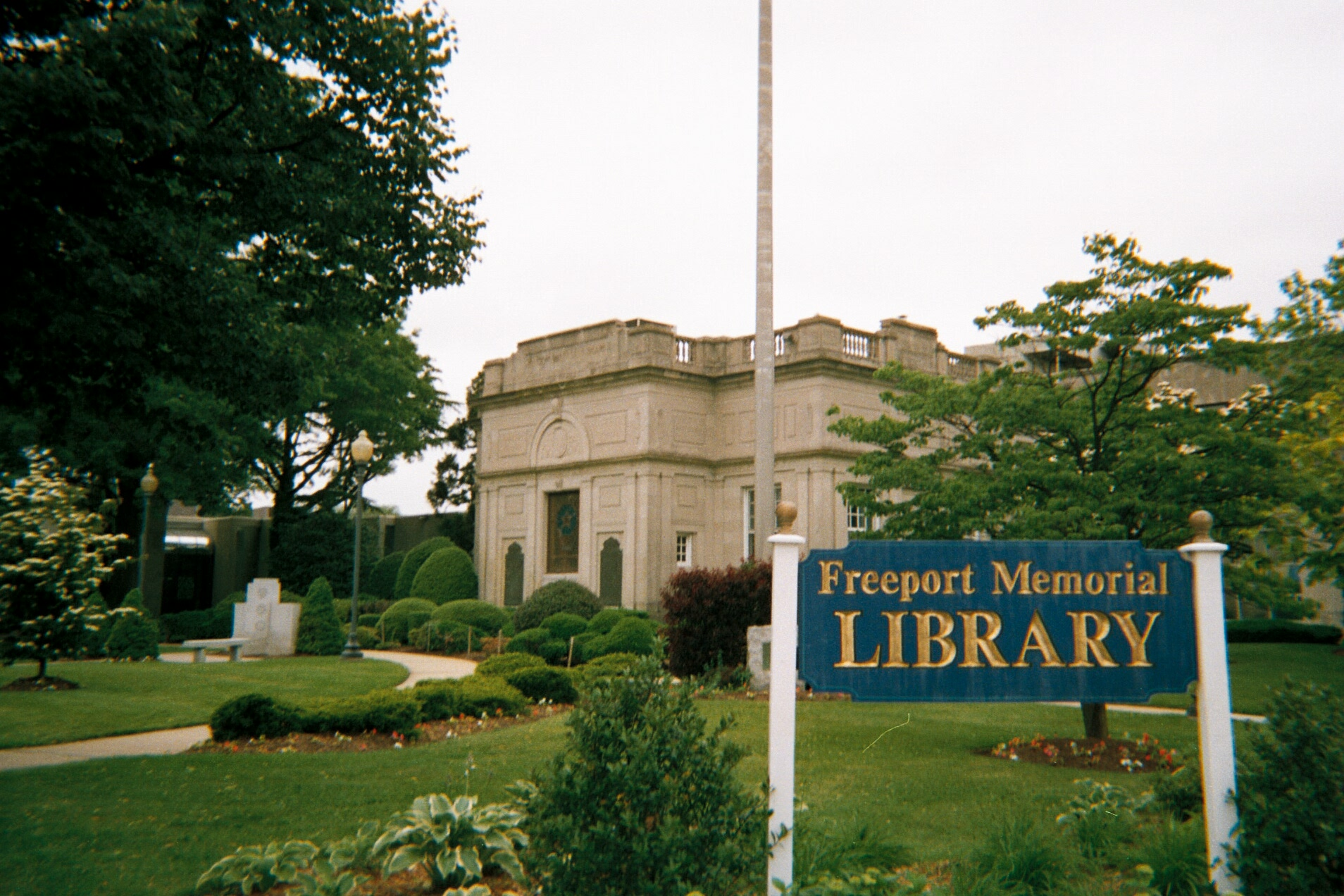
- The library's front façade
- Location: 144 West Merrick Road, Freeport, New York 11520
- Type: Public
- Established: 1884

Other information
- Website: freeportlibrary.info

The Freeport Memorial Library is the main library serving the Incorporated Village of Freeport in Nassau County, on the South Shore of Long Island, in New York, United States. Its service area is known as the Freeport Library District. It is a member of the Nassau Library System.

== Description ==
The Freeport Memorial Library is one of Nassau County's largest public libraries. The library was founded in 1884 as part of the school system, granted a provisional charter by the state Board of Regents in 1895, and a permanent charter on December 21, 1899. In 1911 it was moved from a school building to a rented room in the Miller Building on South Grove Street. At that time it was a membership library: members paid ten cents for a card and were permitted to borrow two books at a time, one fiction and one nonfiction.

A drive was started in 1920 to construct a library building. The resulting library at the corner of Merrick Road and Ocean Avenue, a Beaux Arts building designed by architect Charles M. Hart, opened on Memorial Day, 1924. A year later it was renamed Freeport Memorial Library. In 1928, a tablet was erected with the names of Freeport's war dead from the American Civil War, Spanish–American War, and World War I.

Additional wings were dedicated on April 19, 1959, and on Memorial Day, 1985. Plaques were added to honor Freeporters who died in World War II, the Korean War, and the Vietnam War. The original plan was for such extensions to be built off the original parts of the building.

== Service area ==
The Freeport Library District, which is served through the Freeport Memorial Library, serves the heavy majority of the Village of Freeport.

== See also ==
- The Bryant Library
- Long Beach Public Library
