= Emanuel Pupulidy =

American racing driver

Emanuel M. Pupulidy (October 10, 1918 – August 20, 1996) was an American race car driver of the 1950s and 1960s. He was also referred to as Emil Pupulidy, Emil Pupilidy, Emanuel Pupilidy, Pup Pupulidy or Pup Pupilidy.

== Life ==
Pupulidy was born on October 10, 1918. He lived in Freeport, New York.

Pupulidy became interested in building and racing cars. Notably he tuned Porsche cars for racing. In 1958, he won the SCCA F Production Class championship.

Pupulidy married Doris, and they had a daughter named Susan.

Pupulidy died on August 20, 1996.
