= Duffy and Sweeney =

American comedy duo

Duffy and Sweeney were an American comedy duo in vaudeville. They were James Terence Duffy (1889 – March 30, 1939) and Frederick Chase Sweeney (August 6, 1894 – December 10, 1954).

Jimmy Duffy was born in New York City. He started his career in the 1890s, in a song and dance act with his parents, credited as Duffy, Sawtelle and Duffy. By 1910, he worked in a comic pairing with Mercedes Lorenz. At the same time, Freddy Sweeney, born in Harrisburg, Pennsylvania, was working in a trick cycling act.

Duffy and Sweeney began working together as a double act in 1918. Both were of Irish heritage, and the pair were later described as "the last of the great Irish knockabout comedy teams" and as "one of the funniest knockabout comedy acts in vaudeville". In their act, they addressed each other formally as "Mr Duffy" and "Mr Sweeney", while engaging in repartee and becoming increasingly confrontational, often culminating in slapping, hitting or fighting each other. Their sketches were largely improvised, and unpredictable, "in large part because of the amount of liquor they consumed between performances".

Duffy also wrote material for shows including Earl Carroll's Vanities in 1923, and later wrote for NBC. The duo worked with W. C. Fields, were admired by Groucho Marx, and influenced other performers such as the Three Stooges. However, in the early 1930s the pair's alcoholism ended the partnership.

In 1939, at the age of 50, Duffy was found dead in the street near Times Square, New York City, the result of alcohol abuse. Sweeney worked in small parts in Hollywood; he died in 1954 at the age of 60.
