= Dave Kadela =

American football player (born 1978)

No. 73, 61
- Position: Offensive Tackle

Personal information
- Born: May 6, 1978 (age 48); Dearborn, Michigan, U.S.
- Listed height: 6 ft 6 in (1.98 m)
- Listed weight: 300 lb (136 kg)

Career information
- High school: Dublin Coffman High School (Dublin, Ohio); Fork Union Military Academy (Fork Union, Virginia)
- College: Virginia Tech
- NFL draft: 2001: undrafted

Career history
- Atlanta Falcons (2001)*; Jacksonville Jaguars (2001)*; Atlanta Falcons (2001−2002); Jacksonville Jaguars (2002−2003); Carolina Panthers (2004–2006); → Berlin Thunder (2004)
- * Offseason or practice squad member only
- Stats at Pro Football Reference

David Richard Kadela Jr. (born May 6, 1978) is an American former professional football player who played offensive tackle for the Carolina Panthers, Atlanta Falcons, and the Jacksonville Jaguars of the National Football League (NFL).

== Early life ==
Born in Dearborn, Michigan, Kadela lettered two years in football and lacrosse at Dublin Coffman High School in Ohio. He earned all-conference and all-district honors as a defensive end and offensive lineman. He prepped for a year at Fork Union Military Academy in Fork Union, Virginia where he was recruited by Virginia Tech.

== College career ==
He started his final 34 consecutive contests at right tackle for Virginia Tech, where he protected future NFL quarterback Michael Vick and allowed 1.5 sacks. He was named first-team All-Big East as a senior in 2000, and also garnered second-team All-Big East recognition as a junior in 1999.

== Professional career ==
Kadela was signed as an undrafted free agent by the Atlanta Falcons before the 2001 NFL season. After being waived by the Falcons before the season, he was signed and then released by the Jacksonville Jaguars. Atlanta re-signed him, and he spent the remainder of the season with the team. He spent most of the next season as a backup before being waived and signed by Jacksonville again. He was waived before the 2003 NFL season, and was picked up by the Panthers. Carolina allocated him to the Berlin Thunder of NFL Europe, and he started all 10 games for the Thunder. In addition to the team leading the league in offense and winning the World Bowl, he made the All-NFL Europe team. He was brought back to Carolina full time for the 2004 season, where he played backup to Todd Fordham and Jordan Gross.

== Post-football career ==
After retiring from the NFL, Kadela became a special agent at the Federal Bureau of Investigation (FBI).

== Personal life ==
Kadela met his wife at Virginia Tech, where she was a college swimmer.
