= Heinrich Pursuit =

Pursuit
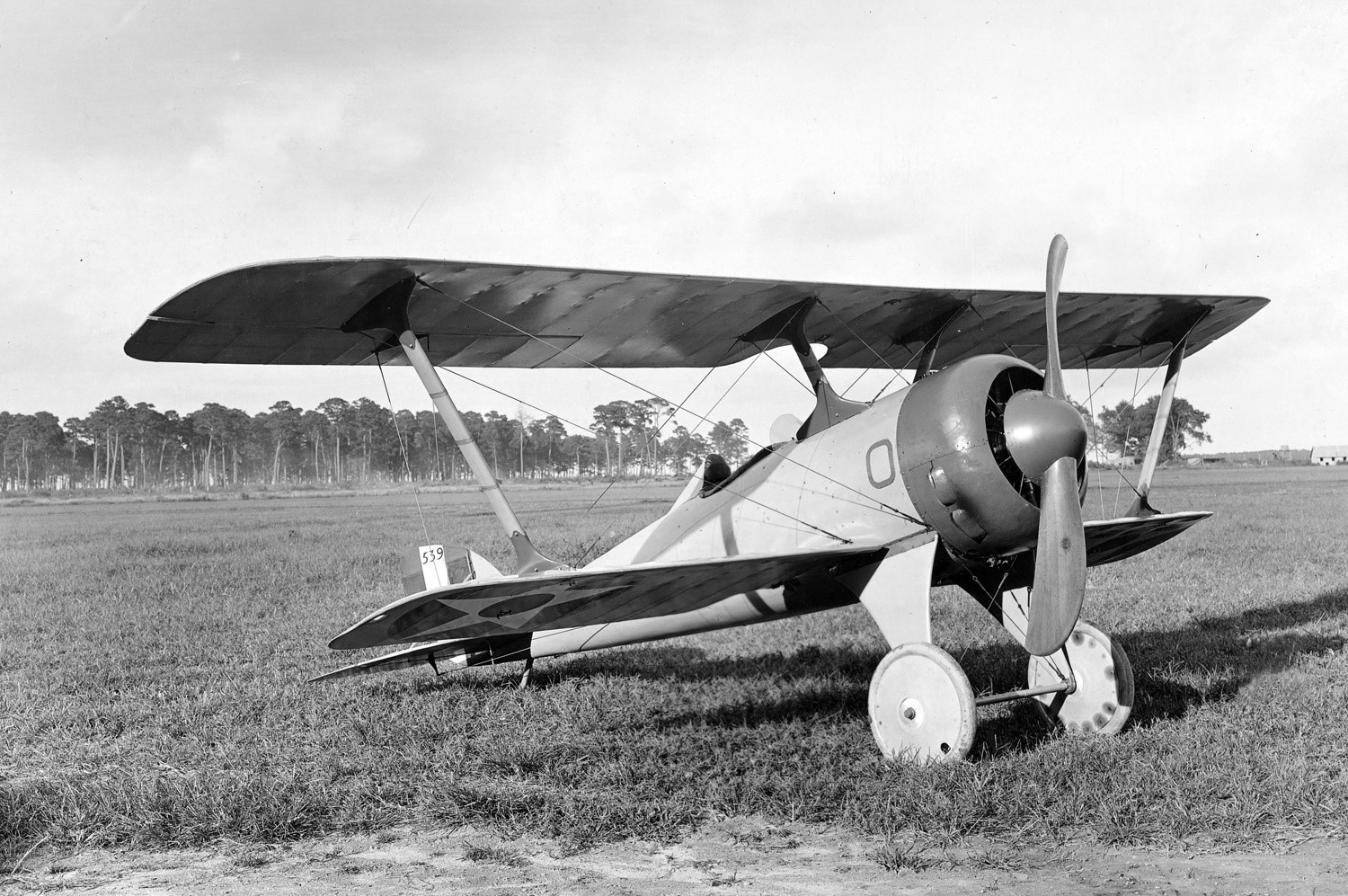

General information
- Type: Fighter
- National origin: United States
- Manufacturer: Victor Aircraft Corporation
- Designer: Albert S Heinrich
- Number built: 4

History
- First flight: 1917

The Heinrich Pursuit (Victor Scout) was an American fighter prototype of the 1910s. It was the only known aircraft designed by Albert S. Heinrich.

== Development ==
During the 19 months in which the US participated in World War I, several attempts were made to design competent single-seat fighters of original design. Among these was the Heinrich Pursuit, conceived in 1917 by Albert Heinrich and built by the Victor Aircraft Corporation. Aerodynamically clean, the Pursuit was a single-bay, unequal-span biplane, powered by a 100 hp Gnome engine.

== Operational history ==
Two examples were ordered by the US Army Signal Corps. The first was delivered in November 1917, and underwent field testing at McCook Field, Dayton, Ohio. However, at the time US Army Air Service policy was to forego fighters of national design in favour of more tested foreign types. Nevertheless, the Pursuit was considered to have potential as a fighter trainer, and two more aircraft were ordered. These were powered by a more reliable 80 hp Le Rhône engine, and had a strengthened cabane and paired struts. The gross weight was reduced by 77 kg. These aircraft, called the Pursuit Mk II were delivered in early 1918 but no further development followed.

== Variants ==
- Mk I - fighter version (2 built)
- Mk II - lighter, faster fighter trainer version (2 built)

== Units using this aircraft ==
United States

- Aviation Section, U.S. Signal Corps

== Specifications (Pursuit Mk I) ==
General characteristics

- Crew: 1
- Wingspan: 26 ft 0 in (7.92 m)
- Wing area: 162.5 sq ft (15.09 m^{2})
- Gross weight: 1,235 lb (560 kg)
- Powerplant: 1 × Gnome Monosoupape 9 Type B-2 nine-cylinder rotary engine , 100 hp (75 kW)

Performance

- Maximum speed: 115 mph (185 km/h, 100 kn)

== See also ==
- Baldwin, Nassau County, New York
