= Freeport High School (New York) =

Public high school in the United States

Location
- 50 South Brookside Avenue; Freeport, Nassau County, New York 11520; United States; 40.6542563°N 73.6024711°W

Information
- School type: Public, High school
- Opened: Around the 1960s
- School district: Freeport Public Schools
- CEEB code: 332000
- NCES School ID: 3611550
- Principal: David Zimbler
- Teaching staff: 165.13 FTEs
- Grades: 9–12
- Gender: Co-ed
- Enrollment: 2,289 (as of 2023–2024)
- Student to teacher ratio: 13.86
- Colors: Red and White
- Team name: Red Devils
- Website: www.freeportschools.org/schools/freeport_high_school

Freeport High School is a public high school located in Freeport, in Nassau County, New York, United States. Serving students in ninth through twelfth grade, it is the only high school operated by the Freeport Public Schools.

As of the 2018–19 school year, the school had an enrollment of 2,177 students and 156.0 classroom teachers (on an FTE basis), for a student–teacher ratio of 14.0:1. There were 1,130 students (51.9% of enrollment) eligible for free lunch and 79 (3.6% of students) eligible for reduced-cost lunch.

== Administration ==
The school's principal is David Zimbler. His administration team includes four assistant principals.

== Notable alumni ==
- Medea Benjamin (born Susan Benjamin), political activist, co-founder of Code Pink
- Raymond Harry Brown (born 1946), composer, arranger, trumpet player and jazz educator.
- D'Brickashaw Ferguson (born 1983), former American football offensive tackle who played ten seasons in the NFL for the New York Jets.
- Flavor Flav (William Jonathan Drayton, Jr.), rapper and reality TV star; grew up in Freeport and neighboring Roosevelt
- George Gollin, an elementary particle physicist and physics professor
- Morlon Greenwood (born 1978, class of 1996), former American football linebacker. who played in the NFL for the Miami Dolphins, Houston Texans and Oakland Raiders.
- Jay Hieron (born 1976), actor, stuntman and former mixed martial artist.
- Mitch Kapor, founder of Lotus Development Corporation and the designer of Lotus 1-2-3
- Erik Larson, author of books such as Isaac's Storm and The Devil in the White City.
- Peter Lerangis, American author of children's and young-adult fiction; valedictorian of the FHS Class of 1973
- Dino Mattessich, university administrator and former college lacrosse coach and player.
- Lou Reed, singer-songwriter and founding member of The Velvet Underground
- Harold E. Varmus (born 1939), Nobel Prize-winning scientist who was director of the National Institutes of Health and the National Cancer Institute.
- Michael Zielenziger, American journalist and author
- Craig Pittman, also known as Sgt. Craig Pittman, a professional wrestler and former US marine who competed in World Championship Wrestling in the 1990s.
