= Albert S. Heinrich =

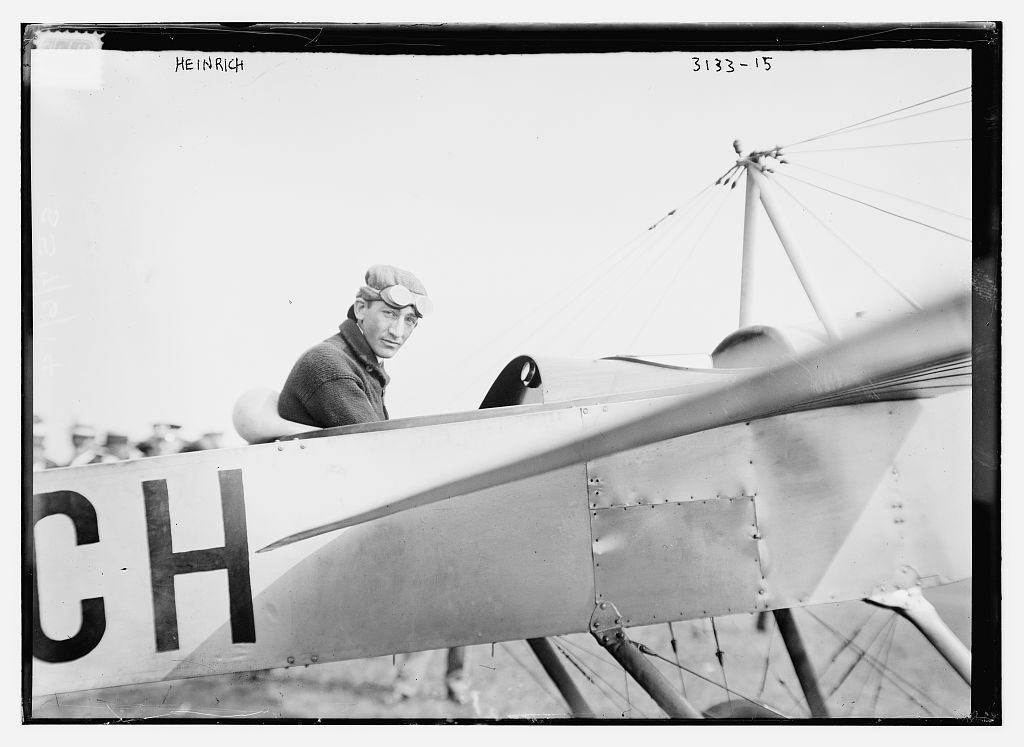
Heinrich on July 4, 1914

Albert Sigmund Heinrich (October 27, 1889 – June 25, 1974), was an American pioneer aviator in Baldwin, New York, who flew the first American monoplane, and designed the Heinrich Pursuit aircraft.

== Biography ==
He was born on October 27, 1888, in Brooklyn, New York and he had a brother, Arthur O. Heinrich (1887-?). He started by building speed boats. He died on June 25, 1974, in Fort Ashby, West Virginia. Albert S. Heinrich was born in Brooklyn, N.Y. October 27, 1889. He died June 25, 1974. Shortly after the turn of the century, Albert and his brother, Arthur O. were building and very successfully racing speed boats. Their dreams and ambitions were turned to aviation by the work of the Wright Brothers. However, they felt that an airplane should have only one pair of wings like a bird. Construction was started in 1909, and in May 1910 it was successfully flown. Albert, age 21, was the pilot on the first flight. Arthur, age 23, piloted the second flight. They had to teach themselves to control their plane and did so after becoming airborne. Every airplane they built was a success. They built trainers and operated two flying schools. During the first World War, they built a number of airplanes for the U.S. Army. When his brother died in 1958, Albert retired and moved to Florida. Later he went to live in Fort Ashby, West Virginia. This from The Early Birds of Aviation CHIRP, January, 1975 Number 81
