= List of people from Binghamton, New York =

The following are notable people who were either born/raised or have lived for a significant period of time in the Binghamton, New York area. Note that the list does not include Binghamton University alumni who lived in the area only to attend the university.

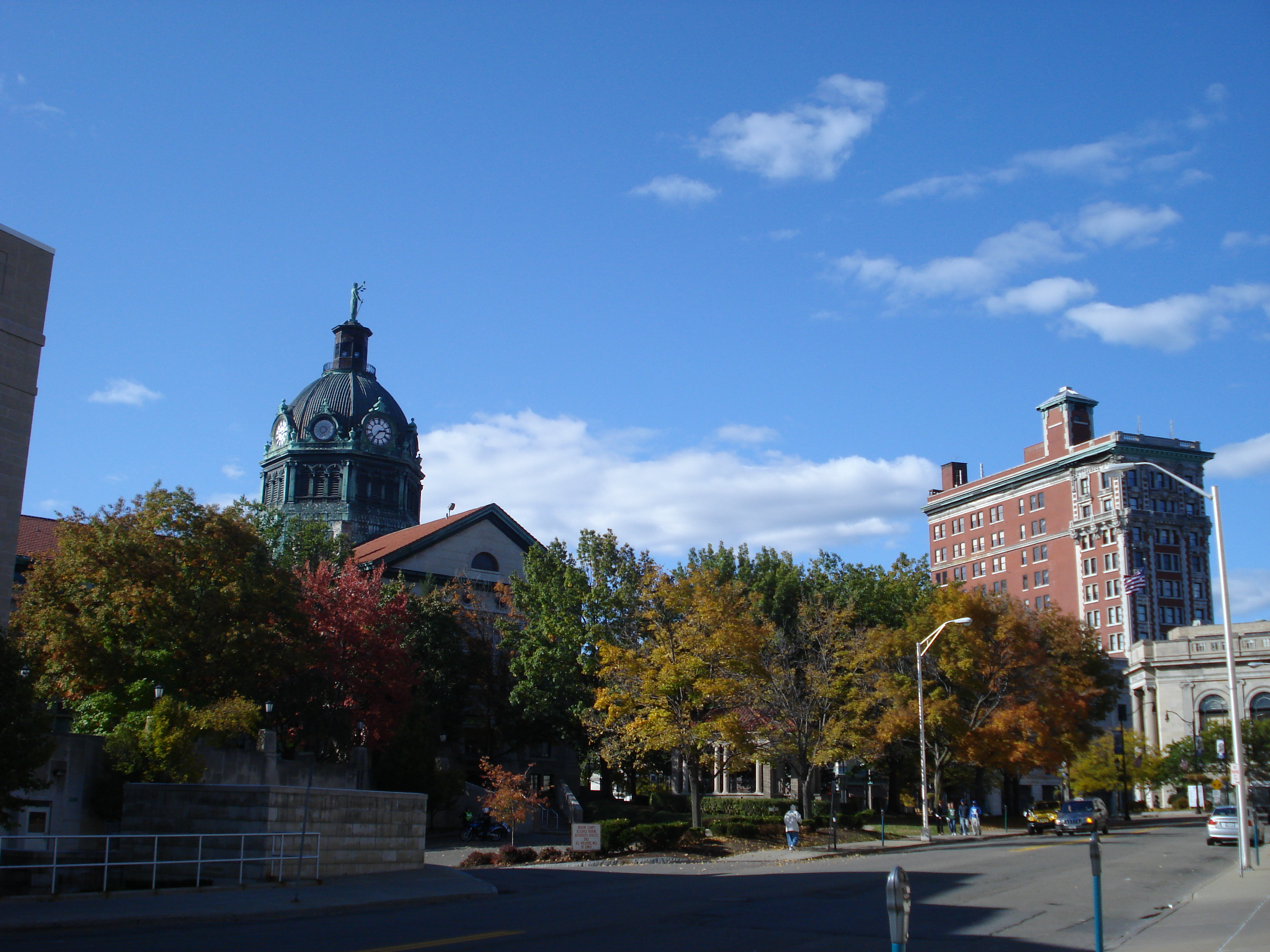
Downtown Binghamton

== Academics and scientists ==
- David A. Ansell, physician and author
- James Axtell, historian
- Carl Edward Baum, electrical engineer
- Herbert P. Bix, historian
- Albert Boime, art historian
- Ruth Britto, mathematician
- Anne Case, economist
- Edith Katherine Cash, mycologist and lichenologist
- Willard N. Clute, botanist
- Peter Hilton, mathematician
- Thomas Hopko, former dean of Saint Vladimir’s Orthodox Theological Seminary
- Mike Hudak, environmental researcher
- Peter Kogge, computer engineer, IBM Fellow
- Edwin A. Link, engineer, inventor of the flight simulator
- Tom M. Mitchell, computer scientist
- Paul Olum, mathematician
- Camille Paglia, author, teacher, social critic
- Ota Ulč, political scientist
- Peter Ungar, paleoanthropologist
- Immanuel Wallerstein, sociologist
- M. Stanley Whittingham, chemist, recipient of the 2019 Nobel Prize in Chemistry
- David Sloan Wilson, evolutionary biologist

== Actors and entertainers ==
- Charlie Ahearn, film director
- Rick Baker, makeup artist
- Stephanie Courtney, Progressive
- Dick Biondi, disc jockey
- John Conboy, Emmy-winning soap opera producer
- Jeremy Davidson, actor
- Richard Deacon, actor
- Angel Desai, actress
- John Ducey, TV actor
- Shareeka Epps, actress
- Darlanne Fluegel, actress, model
- Helen Gardner, actress and producer of silent black and white film
- Anthony George, soap opera actor
- Hugh Herbert, actor and comedian
- Jim Hutton, actor
- Jasmine Kennedie, drag performer
- Jessica Lee, model, Playboy Playmate, August 1996
- Wilbur Mack, actor
- Ernie Manouse, anchorman
- Leonard Melfi, playwright and actor
- Bridget Moynahan, model, actress
- Tony Northrup, video producer, author, and photographer
- Stanley J. Orzel, film director
- Stephen Park, comedian, actor
- Karl Ravech, ESPN personality
- Amy Sedaris, comedian and actress
- Rod Serling, writer, television producer, creator of The Twilight Zone TV series
- Jackie Siegel, model, actress
- DeAnne Smith, comedian and writer
- Roger Watkins, writer, director, producer, actor
- Chris Wedge, film director
- David Weisman, film director
- Sam Weisman, Emmy-nominated TV director
- Volkmar Wentzel, photographer and cinematographer for National Geographic
- Mark Withers, actor

== Artists and architects ==
- Renata Bernal, visual artist
- Orlando Busino, illustrator
- Johnny Hart, cartoonist, creator of comic strips B.C. and The Wizard of Id
- John Marshall, artist for comic strip Blondie
- Charles McGill, sculptor
- Jerry Moriarty, artist and cartoonist
- Marla Olmstead, painter
- Brant Parker, cartoonist, co-creator of The Wizard of Id
- Isaac G. Perry, architect
- Kenneth F. Space, photographer, filmmaker, cinematographer
- C. Edward Vosbury, architect
- Susan Waters, painter
- Ed Wilson, sculptor

== Athletes and athletics personnel ==
- Joel Bennett, baseball player
- Colbie Young, football player
- Tyler Biggs, hockey player
- Dave Bliss, basketball coach
- Danijal Brković, soccer player
- Daniel Capecci, soccer player
- Dan Casey, baseball player
- Christopher Coleman, bobsledder
- Cathy Compton, softball coach
- Mike Coolbaugh, baseball coach
- Scott Coolbaugh, baseball player
- Jerry D'Amigo, hockey player
- Babe Danzig, baseball player
- Wink Davenport, volleyball player and official
- Alec Dufty, soccer player
- Mike Dunham, hockey player
- Diane Farrell, tennis player
- George Feigenbaum, basketball player
- Billy Gabor, basketball player
- Rob Gardner, baseball player
- Barry Goldstein, golf instructor
- Bobby Gonzalez, basketball coach
- Bill Hallahan, baseball player
- Gerry Hannahs, baseball player
- Megan Jacoby, Hyrox athlete and 2024 Hyrox World Champion
- Jim Johnson, baseball player
- Arthur Jones, football player
- Chandler Jones, football player
- DaQuan Jones, football player
- Jon Jones, mixed martial arts fighter, UFC Heavyweight champion, former Light Heavyweight champion
- Isaiah Kacyvenski, football player
- Richie Karl, golfer
- Jon Kimmel, football player
- Steve Kraly, baseball player
- Joe LaRue, competitive eater
- Sang-chul Lee, taekwondo coach
- Johnny Logan, baseball player
- Ron Luciano, baseball umpire, author of The Umpire Strikes Back
- Frank LoVuolo, football player
- Emily Mackay, runner
- Billy Martin, baseball player and manager
- Tamdan McCrory, mixed martial arts fighter
- Joe Mott, football player
- Kylie Nadaner, soccer player
- Troy Nickerson, wrestler
- Hidy Ochiai, martial artist
- Mayumi Pejo, Olympic martial artist
- King Rice, basketball coach
- Mike Rotunda, wrestler
- Jack Sharkey, World Heavyweight Champion boxer
- Matt Tanzini, soccer player
- Justin Topa, baseball player
- Rasa von Werder, bodybuilder, exotic dancer
- George S. Whitney, football coach
- Randy Will, Olympic bobsledder
- Jake Zumbach, football player

== Business figures ==
- Jonathan Michael Ansell, international insurance company founder and CEO
- Joseph H. Boardman, CEO of Amtrak, administrator of Federal Railroad Administration
- Edward E. Ford, businessman and philanthropist
- George F. Johnson, co-owner of Endicott Johnson Corporation
- George Hull, tobacconist and Cardiff Giant hoaxer
- Willis Sharpe Kilmer, promoter of Swamp Root patent medicine and thoroughbred owner
- John D. Rockefeller, founder of Standard Oil
- Edward W. Stack, CEO of Dick's Sporting Goods
- Gustav Stickley, furniture manufacturer, prominent promoter of American Craftsman movement
- Oliver Treyz, television executive
- Thomas Tull, CEO of Legendary Pictures, part owner of the Pittsburgh Steelers
- Thomas J. Watson, Sr., founder and president of International Business Machines (IBM)
- Adam Weitsman, entrepreneur and philanthropist

== Lawyers and jurists ==
- Alvaro Bedoya, attorney and FTC commissioner
- Barbara M. Lynn, judge
- Ellis Rubin, attorney
- Jerome B. Simandle, judge
- Lorenzo P. Williston, judge and politician

== Military figures ==
- Joseph J. Bartlett, brigadier general and diplomat
- Joseph Brant, Mohawk military leader
- John L. Broome, marine officer
- John Francis Burnes, marine officer
- Daniel Bursch, astronaut
- Howard G. Garrison, US Army major general
- Douglas G. Hurley, astronaut
- David Ireland, colonel
- Edward F. Jones, army officer and merchant
- Mark D. McCormack, US Army major general
- Brett James McMullen, brigadier general, USAF retired, Windsor Central High School graduate
- Lawrence D. Peters, marine, Medal of Honor recipient
- John C. Robinson, major general, Medal of Honor recipient
- Lester R. Stone, Jr., sergeant, Medal of Honor recipient
- Douglas H. Wheelock, astronaut

== Musicians ==
- Frederick Ayres, composer
- Elaine Bonazzi, opera mezzo-soprano
- Corky Cornelius, jazz trumpeter
- Fred Coury, drummer
- Steve Davis, jazz trombonist
- Dena DeRose, jazz pianist and singer
- Chris Griffin, jazz trumpeter
- John Hollenbeck, jazz drummer and composer
- Robert Jager, composer
- Richard Leech, opera tenor
- Tim Malchak, singer/songwriter
- Elmar Oliveira, violinist
- Steve Perry, singer/guitarist for the Cherry Poppin' Daddies
- Stephen Roessner, Grammy Award-winning recording engineer, drummer for Saxon Shore
- Slam Stewart, jazz bassist
- Gary Wilson, performance artist
- Ed Zandy, trumpeter

== Politicians ==
- Warren M. Anderson, state senator
- Hakeem Jeffries, House minority leader
- Bill Aswad, Vermont state legislator
- William H. Austin, Wisconsin state legislator
- William Weaver Bennett, first mayor of Teaneck, New Jersey
- Stacey Campfield, Tennessee state senator
- Orlow W. Chapman, U.S. solicitor general
- Daniel S. Dickinson, U.S. senator
- Edwin Arthur Hall, congressman
- Robert Harpur, state politician
- William Henry Hill, congressman
- Thomas W. Libous, state senator
- Donna Lupardo, state assemblywoman
- Tom McDonald, U.S. ambassador to Zimbabwe
- Daniel A. Mica, congressman
- John Mica, congressman
- Stephen C. Millard, congressman
- E. A. Mitchell, congressman
- Marshall F. Moore, governor
- Thomas C. Platt, U.S. senator
- Keith Rothfus, congressman
- Raymond Bartlett Stevens, congressman
- Randall Terry, founder of Operation Rescue
- Benjamin F. Tracy, Secretary of the Navy
- J. Ernest Wharton, congressman
- Forman E. Whitcomb, state assemblyman
- George H. Williston, Wisconsin state and territorial legislator
- Katie Wilson, mayor of Seattle
- Ivan Yermachenka, Belarusian politician, diplomat and writer
- Ken Zubay, Minnesota state legislator

== Writers and journalists ==
- Eric Appel, writer and director
- Martin Bayne, blogger, activist
- Harvey Bullock, screenwriter, producer
- C. J. Chivers, journalist
- Jack Dann, science fiction author and editor
- Everett De Morier, novelist, author, humorist
- Kate Gale, poet
- Amy Kim Ganter, author and illustrator
- John Gardner, novelist
- Howard R. Garis, author of Uncle Wiggily stories
- Don Goddard, radio and TV news reporter
- Stephen Kalinich, poet and songwriter
- David Ross Locke, aka Petroleum V. Nasby, journalist and early political commentator
- Gerald McCarthy, poet
- Peter Robinson, speechwriter for Ronald Reagan
- Pamela Sargent, science fiction author
- David Sedaris, humorist and writer
- Pete Van Wieren, play-by-play baseball commentator
- Jean Webster, author
- Jenna Wolfe, Today Show anchor

== Others ==
- Alexander Aitchison, firefighter chief
- Joseph Barbara, mobster
- Russell Bufalino, mobster
- Frances M. Beal, activist
- Michael Dahulich, archbishop
- Gerald Nicholas Dino, fourth bishop of the Byzantine Catholic Eparchy of Phoenix
- William L. Moore, civil rights activist
