= Ted Greene (American football) =

American football player (1932–1982)

No. 54
- Position: Linebacker

Personal information
- Born: July 19, 1932; Kentucky, U.S.
- Died: April 16, 1982 (aged 49); Louisville, Kentucky, U.S.
- Listed height: 6 ft 1 in (1.85 m)
- Listed weight: 230 lb (104 kg)

Career information
- High school: Union-Endicott (Endicott, New York)
- College: Tampa (1952–1955)
- NFL draft: 1956: undrafted

Career history
- New York Giants (1956)*; Dallas Texans (1960–1961); New York Titans (1962)*; Dallas Texans (1962)
- * Offseason or practice squad member only

Awards and highlights
- AFL champion (1962)
- Stats at Pro Football Reference

Theodore William Greene (January 25, 1932 – April 16, 1982) was an American professional football linebacker who played three seasons for the Dallas Texans of the American Football League (AFL). Greene played college football at the University of Tampa. He was a member of the Texans team that won the 1962 AFL championship.

== Early life and college ==
Theodore William Greene was born on January 25, 1932, in Kentucky. He attended Union-Endicott High School in Endicott, New York.

Greene was a member of the Tampa Spartans of the University of Tampa from 1952 to 1955.

== Professional career ==
After going undrafted in the 1956 NFL draft, Greene signed with the New York Giants. However, he was later released.

Green, who was coaching high school football in Plant City, Florida at the time, signed with the Dallas Texans of the American Football League (AFL) in 1960. He played in all 14 games, starting ten, during the Texans' inaugural 1960 season, recording one sack and three interceptions for 26 yards. The Texans finished the year with an 8–6 record. Greene appeared in all 14 games for the second consecutive season, starting six, in 1961, totaling one sack and one interception for 30 yards.

On December 25, 1961, Greene and Sid Fournet were traded to the New York Titans for Bobby Ply. Greene was released by the Titans on August 21, 1962, after refusing to take a pay cut.

Greene signed with the Texans again in November 1962. He then played in four games for them during the 1962 season. He also played in the 1962 AFL Championship Game, a 20–17 victory over the Houston Oilers, appearing on special teams while posting one solo tackle and two assisted tackles.

== Personal life ==
Greene worked in insurance in Dallas, Texas. He died of a heart attack on April 16, 1982, in Louisville, Kentucky.
