= Gerald McCarthy =

Gerald McCarthy may refer to:

- Gerald McCarthy (footballer) (born 1951), former Australian rules footballer
- Gerald McCarthy (hurler) (born 1945), retired Irish hurling manager and former player
- Gerald McCarthy (poet) (born 1947), American poet, best known for work on the Vietnam War
- Gerry McCarthy (born 1958), Australian politician
