= Morlon Greenwood =

American football player (born 1978)

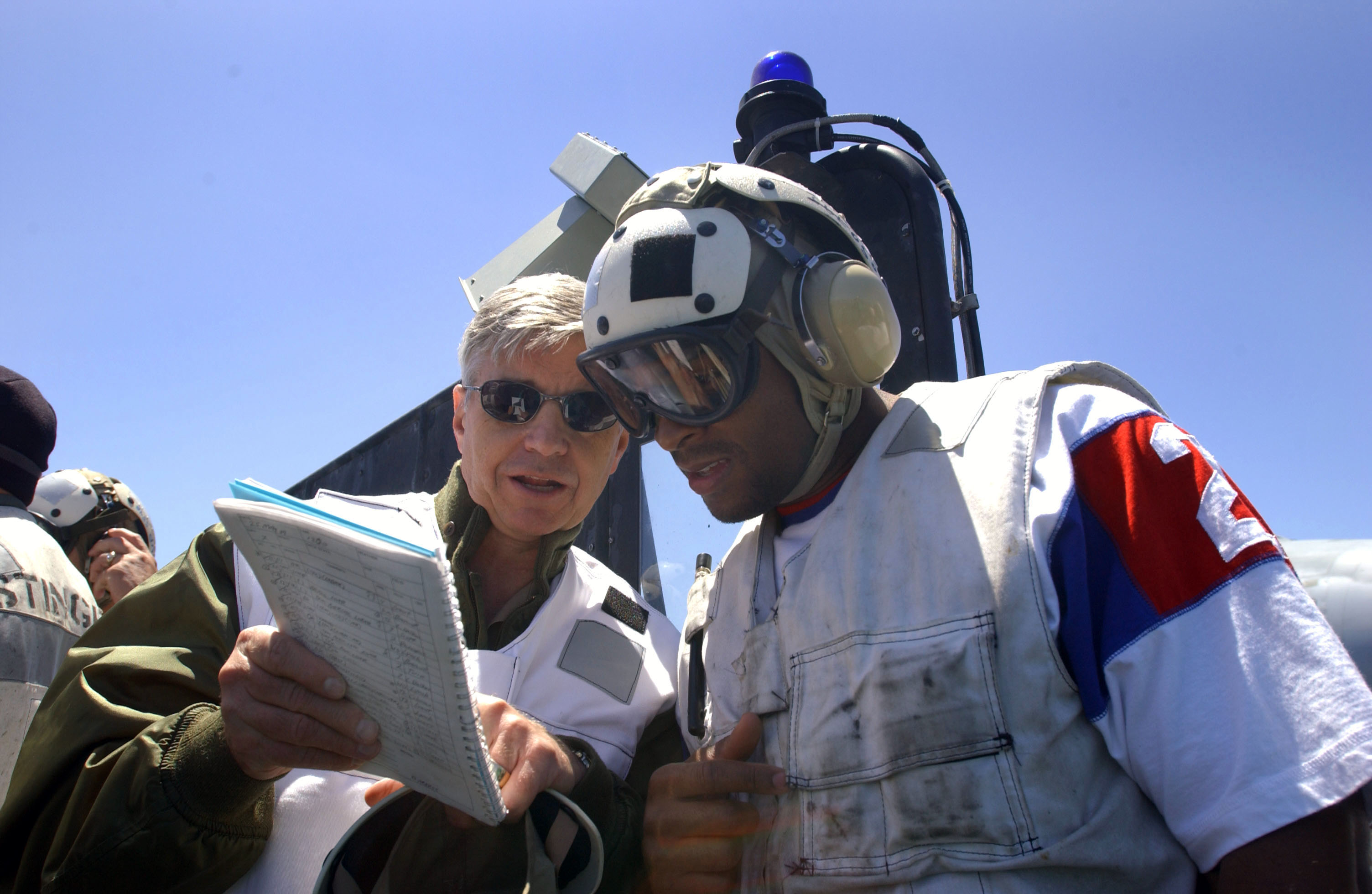
- Greenwood (right) aboard USS John C. Stennis in 2004

No. 52, 56
- Position: Linebacker

Personal information
- Born: July 17, 1978 (age 48); Kingston, Jamaica
- Listed height: 6 ft 0 in (1.83 m)
- Listed weight: 241 lb (109 kg)

Career information
- High school: Freeport (NY)
- College: Syracuse
- NFL draft: 2001: 3rd round, 88th overall pick

Career history
- Miami Dolphins (2001–2004); Houston Texans (2005–2008); Oakland Raiders (2009)*; Omaha Nighthawks (2010–2012)
- * Offseason or practice squad member only

Career NFL statistics
- Total tackles: 685
- Sacks: 7
- Forced fumbles: 3
- Fumble recoveries: 5
- Interceptions: 2
- Stats at Pro Football Reference

Morlon O'Neil Greenwood (born July 17, 1978) is a Jamaican-American former professional football linebacker.

== Early life ==
Greenwood attended Freeport High School and participated in both football and wrestling. At first, he was a wrestling athlete who had won the Empire State Games in the freestyle division as a sophomore and as a junior, as well as the Greco-Roman division as a junior. An assistant wrestling coach, Russ Cellan (who was also the head football coach) then convinced him to play football as a junior. As a senior in football, he was an All-County and an All-State pick. As a senior wrestler in 1996, he defeated Isaiah Kacyvenski of Union-Endicott High School for the state championship in the 215-lb. class.

== College career ==
Greenwood played collegiately at Syracuse University, where he started 48 consecutive games at linebacker. As a redshirt freshman, he recorded 64 tackles and two quarterback sacks while being named to the Freshman All-American second-team choice by The Sporting News. During his sophomore year, he made 55 tackles and 3 sacks. As a junior for the Orange, Greenwood collected 91 tackles along with one sack, which was against Michigan quarterback Tom Brady. Being named co-captain his senior year, he had a career-high 98 tackles while being named to the 2000 All-Big East First Team along with teammates Dwight Freeney and others. He graduated from Syracuse with a bachelor's degree in Health and Exercise Science.

== Professional career ==
Greenwood was selected in the third round with the 88th overall pick in the 2001 NFL draft by the Miami Dolphins. He played four years with Miami, including a 2004 season in which he recorded 108 tackles for the Dolphins. In 2005, as a free agent, he signed a five-year contract with the Houston Texans which was worth $22.5 million and featured a $7 million signing bonus. His career with the Texans was highlighted by a 2007 season where he posted 118 tackles. In 2009, he had a brief period with the Oakland Raiders. Morlon Greenwood, a graduate of Freeport High School, was inducted into the inaugural Nassau County High School Athletics Hall of Fame. The class of 6 included notable athletes from Nassau County on Long Island such as Jay Fiedler of the Miami Dolphins and fellow Syracuse alum and NFL Hall of famer Jim Brown. The induction ceremony took place on September 30, 2015, in Long Island, New York.

== NFL career statistics ==
Legend
**Bold**	Career high

=== Regular season ===
Year	Team	Games		Tackles					Interceptions					Fumbles			
Year	Team	GP	GS	Cmb	Solo	Ast	Sck	TFL	Int	Yds	TD	Lng	PD	FF	FR	Yds	TD
2001	MIA	14	12	58	30	28	1.5	1	0	0	0	0	0	0	0	0	0
2002	MIA	**16**	13	57	37	20	1.0	4	0	0	0	0	1	0	0	0	0
2003	MIA	**16**	11	75	50	25	0.5	3	0	0	0	0	1	0	0	0	0
2004	MIA	**16**	15	108	65	**43**	0.0	**8**	0	0	0	0	3	0	0	0	0
2005	HOU	**16**	**16**	112	82	30	**2.0**	4	0	0	0	0	**7**	0	2	0	0
2006	HOU	**16**	**16**	111	85	26	1.0	5	**1**	0	0	0	3	**2**	**3**	**15**	0
2007	HOU	**16**	15	**119**	**91**	28	1.0	3	**1**	**3**	0	**3**	4	1	0	0	0
2008	HOU	15	10	45	31	14	0.0	3	0	0	0	0	1	0	0	0	0
Career		125	108	685	471	214	7.0	31	2	3	0	3	20	3	5	15	0

=== Regular season ===
Year	Team	Games		Tackles					Interceptions					Fumbles			
Year	Team	GP	GS	Cmb	Solo	Ast	Sck	TFL	Int	Yds	TD	Lng	PD	FF	FR	Yds	TD
2001	MIA	**1**	**1**	**7**	**4**	**3**	0.0	0	0	0	0	0	0	0	0	0	0
Career		1	1	7	4	3	0.0	0	0	0	0	0	0	0	0	0	0

== Player profile ==
Greenwood was known mainly for his superb level of strength and conditioning. During his pro day at Syracuse, he posted a 4.47 40 yard dash time, a 415-pound bench press, a 685-pound squat, and a 350-pound power clean. In addition, he was named a 2002 National Strength Coaches Association All American. He was also known for his awareness on the field, having 4 straight NFL seasons of over 100 tackles.
