= Amy Monticello =

American essayist

- Born: August 27, 1982 (age 44); Endicott, New York, United States
- Occupations: Non-fiction writer, essayist
- Writing career
- Genre: literary nonfiction

Amy Monticello (born 1982) is an American essayist, lecturer, and non fiction writer. Monticello is the author of Close Quarters (Sweet Publications, 2012) and How to Euthanize a Horse (Arcadia Press, 2018).

== Life and work ==
Amy Monticello was born in Endicott, New York in 1982. She earned a Master of Fine Arts in creative writing at Ohio State University in 2008. Her book Close Quarters, is classified as a chapbook. In constructing her non-fiction chapbook she took a collection of her shorter essays from a larger project she was working on and used the novella form as a guide. She is an associate professor at Suffolk University in Boston, MA.

== Works ==
=== Books ===
- The Routledge Introduction to American Life Writing. Co-authored with Jason Tucker. Routledge, 2023.
- Close Quarters. Sweet Publications, 2012.
- "How to Euthanize a Horse." Arcadia Press, 2018.

=== Anthology Inclusions ===
- Tuscaloosa Writes This, “Communing with Cancer,” Eds. Brian Oliu and Patti White, Slash Pine Press, 2013.
- Going Om, “Against the Pursuit of Happiness,” Ed. Melissa Carroll, Viva editions/Cleis Press, 2014.

=== Journal Publications ===
- "The Reduced World." under the gum tree.
- "How to Tell the Story of an Ordinary Death." Los Angeles Review of Books.
- "Not Nothing." Brevity.
- "My Only Child Scatters My Ashes." CALYX.
- "Resuscitate." Hotel Amerika.
- "Letters From My Father." Brain, Child.
- "A New and Magical Life." The Rumpus.
- “Waiting for My Milk During the Polar Vortex, I Channel William Blake.” The Common
- “Moderation is the Key.” Prime Number.
- “Shame.” Brevity.
- “The Short Summer.” The Common.
- “The Faces We Carry.”The Nervous Breakdown.
- “Eighteen One-Sided Conversations With My Father.” Women Arts Quarterly Journal.
- “Playing the Odds.” The Nervous Breakdown.
- “Communing with Cancer.” Salon.com.
- “Loving Captain Corcoran.” Stone Canoe.
- “I Know Who You Are.”The Nervous Breakdown.
- Untitled 140-character micro-essay. Creative Nonfiction.
- “How to Euthanize a Horse.” Natural Bridge.
- “The Other Woman.” Iron Horse Literary Review. Notable Essay in Best American Essays.
- “Christmas 1984.” The Nervous Breakdown.
- “Suburban.” Connotation Press: An Online Artifact.
- “A Good Man.” WomenArts Quarterly Journal.
- “Chimney Swift.” Sweet: A Literary Confection.
- “The North Side.” Phoebe.
- “All the Ways We Fool Ourselves.” Waccamaw.
- “Getting Caught.” Prick of the Spindle.
- “Winter.” Upstreet.
- “Miracles We Get.” Redivider.
- “Tradition.”The Rambler.
- “Looking Forward.” Word Riot.
- “Errands.” Flashquake.

=== Craft Articles ===
- “In Defense of the Confessional: Parenting, Inclusivity, and J.D. Schraffenberger’s ‘Droppies Babies’.” Essay Daily. 2014.
- “Hello New Year, Hello 30: A Craft Conversation with Marissa Landrigan.” Her Kind: A Literary Community Powered by VIDA. 2013.
- “More Than One True Thing.” Waccamaw. Issue 11.
- “The Place Where Opposing Instincts Meet.” Tuscaloosa Writes This. Eds. Brian Oliu and Patti White, Slash Pine Press, 2013.

=== Honors ===
- Winner, Arcadia Press Chapbook Prize, 2016.
- Winner, S.I. Newhouse School Prize in Nonfiction, 2013.
- Nominee, Pushcart Prize, 2011.
- Recipient, certificate of appreciation for collaborative course development. Ithaca College Division of Student Affairs, 2011.
- Nominee, Pushcart Prize, 2010.
- Finalist, The Journal’s Alumni Flash Writing Contest, The Ohio State University, 2010.
- Nominee, The Ohio State University's Graduate Associate Teaching Award, 2007.
- Recipient of commendation letter for excellence in teaching from The Ohio State University's First-Year Writing Program, 2006.
- Winner, Ithaca College Writing Contest in creative nonfiction and poetry, 2005.
