= Christopher Bill =

American musician

- Born: June 9, 1992 (age 34); Binghamton, New York, United States
- Genres: Classical Crossover
- Occupations: Musician; YouTuber
- Instrument: Trombone
- Website: classicaltrombone.com

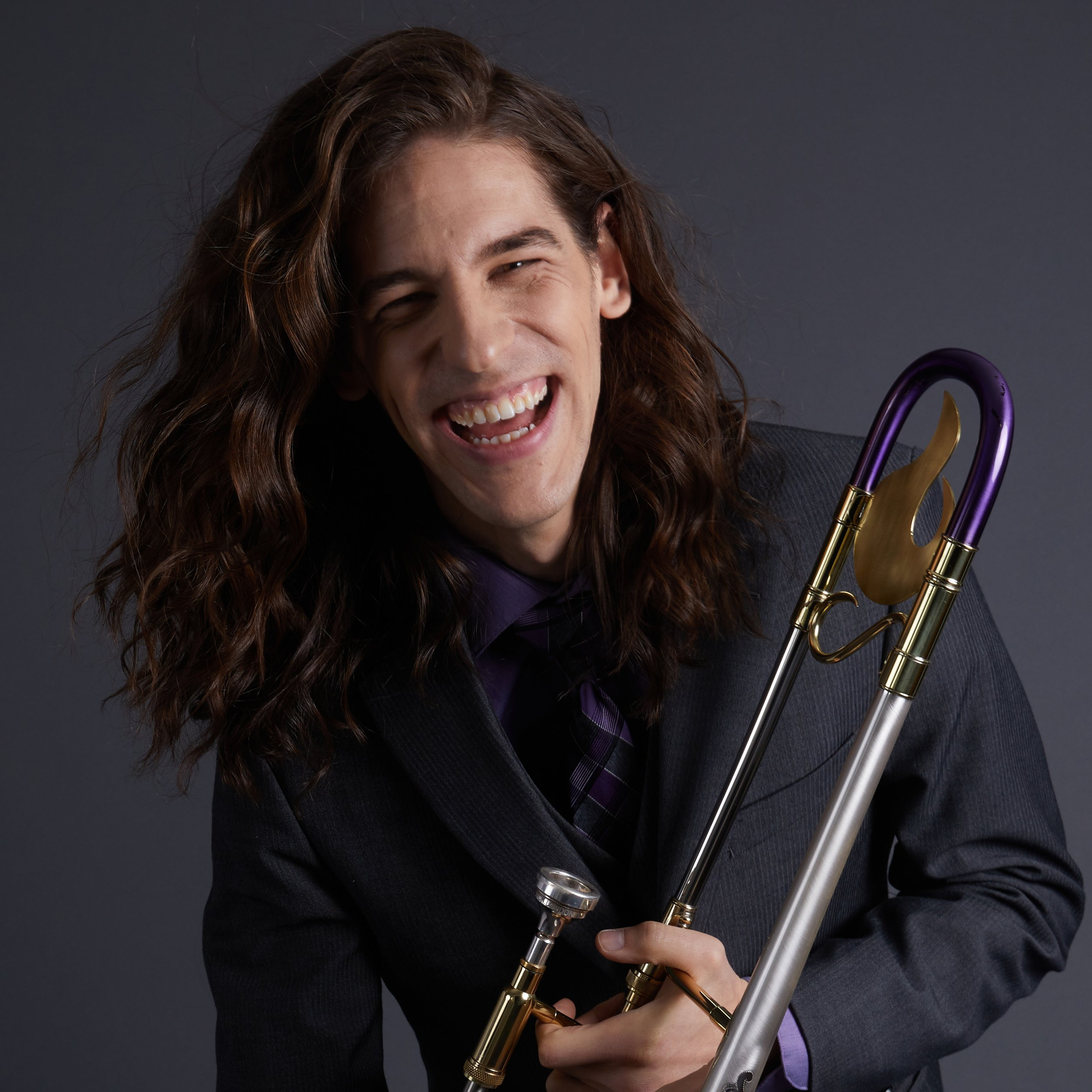

Christopher Bill (born June 9, 1992) is an American trombonist, composer, arranger, music director, and YouTuber. He presents classically arranged popular songs multi-tracked on trombone, both live and in music videos found on his YouTube channel, ClassicalTrombone, which he introduced in 2011.

Bill performs a variety of music styles, from classical and jazz to pop and rock. Aside from original work, his discography contains covers of songs by other musicians and various soundtracks.

Bill has also held positions as music director for episodes of Stargirl and Stranger Things.

His cover version of Pharrell Williams' "Happy" went viral in 2014. As of January 2023, his ClassicalTrombone YouTube channel exceeded 280,000 subscribers and over 64 million total views.

== Early life ==
Bill was born in Binghamton, New York. He grew up the youngest of four siblings. At six years old, he began taking piano lessons. At age ten, he decided to play the trombone and by age twelve he began composing and arranging.

Living in Endicott, New York, Bill attended Union-Endicott High School. While there he was an active member in the school's music program including being drum major for the marching band. During these years he was also a member of the Binghamton Youth Symphony Orchestra, the Bayonne Bridgemen Alumni, and the Syracuse Brigadiers.

== Education ==
Bill received his Bachelor of Music from the Conservatory of Music at the State University of New York at Purchase.

== Career ==
=== YouTube performances ===
While he was studying at the SUNY Purchase Conservatory of Music, Bill began arranging popular songs for trombone quartets. He would record himself playing all four parts, and then upload them to YouTube. The first song to gain popularity was Owl City's "Fireflies", which he uploaded in August 2012. In December 2012 he posted a new Christmas arrangement every day leading up until Christmas, calling it "The 25 Days of Christmas. Starting in July 2013, he began to post a new video every Saturday, and in February 2014 his video of Pharrell Williams' "Happy" went viral. As of December 2015 the video has over 2.8 million views.

Bill has independently released three multi-tracked albums. The first album, entitled Breakthrough was released in the spring of 2014. It consists of pop and rock covers. In the winter of 2014 Bill released his second album, Smiling's My Favorite, an album of Christmas songs. Most recently, Half Man, Half Machine was released in 2017.

=== Live performances ===
Shortly after graduating from college, Bill began to perform his arrangements live. He has performed for audiences at the Conn-Selmer Institute, International Trombone Association Festival, Midwest Clinic, Texas Bandmasters Association, American Trombone Workshop, Con Brio Music Festival, and Condé Nast Digital Day in Moscow.

=== Community involvement ===
Bill has been heavily involved with the International Trombone Association and their annual festival, serving as the director of the youth workshop in 2019.

== Discography ==
- Half Man, Half Machine (2017)
- Breakthrough (2014)
- Smiling's My Favorite (2014)
