= Bobby Ply =

American football player (1940–2022)

- Ply with the Baylor Bears, c. 1961

No. 14, 22, 23
- Position: Defensive back

Personal information
- Born: August 13, 1940; Mission, Texas, U.S.
- Died: May 18, 2022 (aged 81); Raytown, Missouri, U.S.
- Listed height: 6 ft 1 in (1.85 m)
- Listed weight: 190 lb (86 kg)

Career information
- High school: Mission
- College: Baylor
- NFL draft: 1962: 16th round, 216th overall pick
- AFL draft: 1962: 5th round, 37th overall pick

Career history
- Dallas Texans/Kansas City Chiefs (1962-1967); Buffalo Bills (1967); Denver Broncos (1967)

Awards and highlights
- 2× AFL champion (1962, 1966); AFL record: Most passes intercepted in a single game: 4 (tied)

Career AFL statistics
- Interceptions: 9
- Fumble recoveries: 1
- Stats at Pro Football Reference

Robert Vernon Ply (August 13, 1940 – May 18, 2022) was an American professional football player who was a defensive back for six seasons in the American Football League (AFL) for the Dallas Texans/Kansas City Chiefs, Buffalo Bills, and Denver Broncos. He played college football for the Baylor Bears.

On December 2, 1961, Ply was selected by the New York Titans in the fifth round, with the 37th overall pick, of the 1962 AFL draft. On December 25, 1961, he was traded to the Texans for Ted Greene and Sid Fournet.

He was married to Peggy Ply, a dancer for the Kansas City Ballet and they had one daughter and many Shih Tzus. He died at the age of 81 on May 18, 2022, in Raytown, Missouri.

== See also ==
- Other American Football League players
