= Union-Endicott Central School District =

School district in New York, United States

Address
- 1100 East Main Street Endicott, New York, 13760; United States

District information
- Type: Public
- Grades: K–12
- NCES District ID: 3610710

Students and staff
- Students: 3,623
- Teachers: 298.4
- Staff: 372.2
- Student–teacher ratio: 12.14

Other information
- Website: www.uek12.org

Union-Endicott Central School District is a school district headquartered in Endicott, New York.

== Schools ==
Secondary:

- Union-Endicott High School
- Jennie F. Snapp Middle School

Elementary:

- Charles F. Johnson Jr. Elementary School
- George F. Johnson Elementary School
- Ann G. McGuinness Elementary School
- Thomas J. Watson Elementary School

Other:

- Linnaeus W. West School
- Tiger Ventures (Alternate Middle/High School within Linnaeus W. West School)
