= Cider Mill Playhouse =

Theatre in Endicott, New York, US

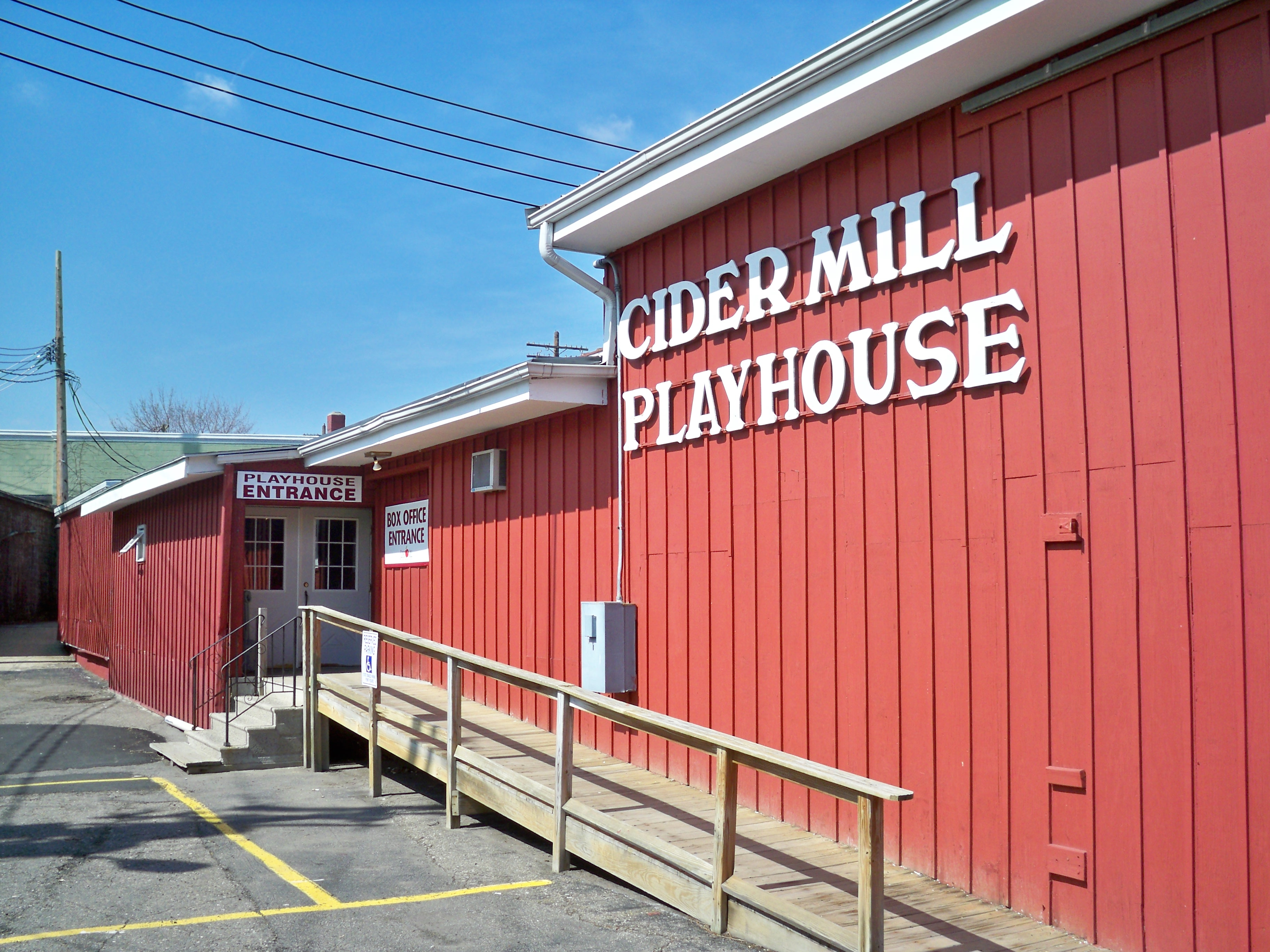
- Front entrance to theatre
- Formation: 1976
- Dissolved: 2017
- Type: Theatre group
- Purpose: Professional Equity house
- Location: 2 Nanticoke Ave. Endicott, New York, USA 13760-0482
- Artistic director: Gail King Belokur
- Website: CiderMillPlayhouse.com

The Cider Mill Playhouse in Endicott, New York, was a professional theatre that produced comedies, dramas, and musicals. It was a member of the Theatre Communications Group and operated as a Small Professional Theatre, Level 5, by annual contract with Actors' Equity Association.

== History ==
In the early 1970s, Binghamton University professor Dr. John Bielenberg began searching for a location for theater students to practice off-campus. Dr. Bielenberg and his colleagues found The Cider Mill, an apple warehouse on South Nanticoke Avenue in the village of Endicott. Orlando Ciotoli agreed to let the university make use of his barn during the slow summer months and a partnership was formed.

In 1991, funding from the university was withdrawn. Cider Mill Playhouse was then incorporated as a 501(c)(3) charitable organization in 1992.

After operating as a semi-professional theatre for many years, Cider Mill Playhouse became an "Equity house" professional theatre known as Cider Mill Stage as of December 21, 2015, under the artistic leadership of Gail King Belokur. In late 2017, the theater company lost its lease on the property and announced that it would dissolve as a nonprofit.

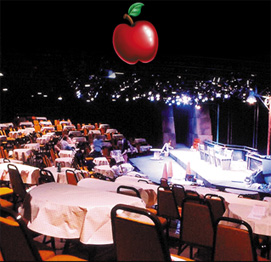
Playhouse Interior

== Productions ==
=== Early Productions ===
Early productions included Company, Sleuth, Night Must Fall, A Funny Thing Happened on the Way to the Forum, Of Mice and Men, Whose Life Is It Anyway, Da, Agnes of God, South Pacific, A Raisin in the Sun, Equus, The Last meeting of the Knights of the White Magnolia, and others. "The professional nature of the theatre was all important to us," recalled Dr. John Bielenberg, now-retired BU Theatre Department Chairman. "The students were able to work with the professionals, whom we hired as actors and directors, in an atmosphere that they would find in their theatre careers."

=== A Christmas Carol ===
Cider Mill mounted an annual production of Charles Dickens' A Christmas Carol. Starting in 1982, Cider Mill Playhouse produced its own musical version of the story which was copyrighted by founder John Bielenberg. After many years and revisions, the final version of this production was produced in 2015. Beginning in 2016, a new adaptation was produced to address copyright issues that had developed. This version expanded the cast to include a combination of paid professionals and a volunteer community ensemble.

=== Final Season: 2016-17 ===
- When In Carthage By Santino DeAngelo September 15 - October 2
- Baskerville: A Sherlock Holmes Mystery By Ken Ludwig October 27 - November 13
- The Importance of Being Earnest By Oscar Wilde January 26 - February 12
- Peter and the Starcatcher March 9–26
- The Drowsy Chaperone June 1–19
- Pump Boys and the Dinettes August 3–19
