= Tony Northrup =

American photographer, author, and photography educator

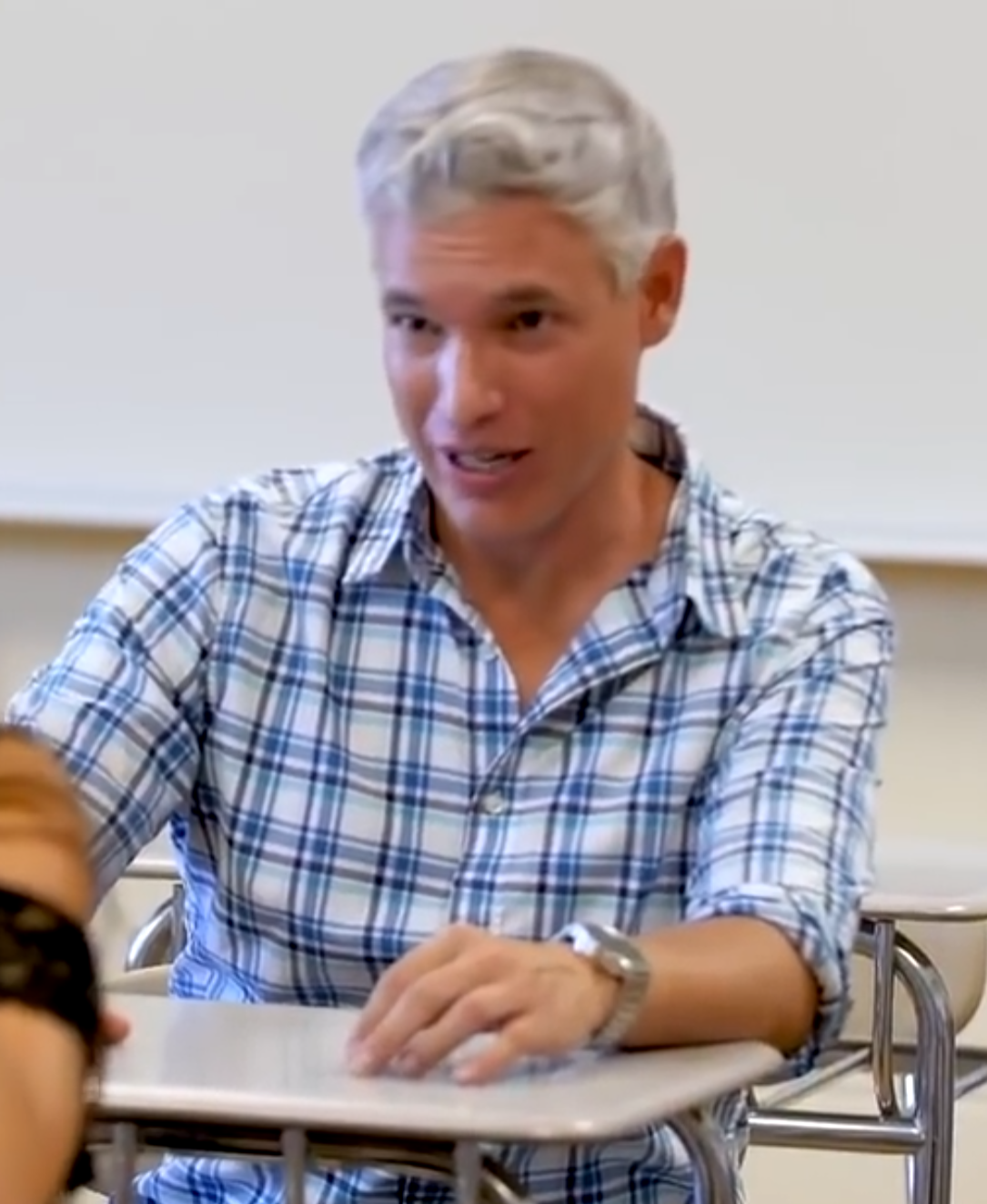
- Northrup in 2018
- Born: Tony Northup; January 3, 1974 (age 52); Pflugerville, Texas
- Occupations: Author, photographer, photography educator

YouTube information
- Channel: Tony & Chelsea Northrup
- Years active: 2007–present
- Genre: Photography
- Subscribers: 1.66 million
- Views: 285 million
- Last updated: August 11, 2026
- Website: www.northrupphotography.com

Tony Northrup (born January 3, 1974) is an American author, photographer, and photography educator. His work has included books about Microsoft Windows and digital photography, as well as the Tony & Chelsea Northrup YouTube channel. He has also worked in commercial stock photography.

== Career ==
In 2000, while working in web hosting for Genuity and writing technical books, Northrup won the “Sexiest Geek Alive” contest organized by the technology website Geek & Guru. Following the contest he made appearances on several TV shows, including To Tell The Truth. By 2013, he had written more than 20 books about Windows system administration and software development, including several training books published by Microsoft Press.

Northrup and photographer Chelsea Northrup were married and worked together in stock photography and photography education. They alternated as both photographers and models, producing images for licensing through stock agencies.

Tony and Chelsea also wrote the photography guide Stunning Digital Photography, which paired written instruction with online videos. They began publishing free supplemental tutorials on YouTube in 2012 and subsequently expanded the channel with regular photography tutorials, equipment reviews, and industry news. In 2016, PetaPixel included the channel in its list of photography channels to follow and described it as one of YouTube's fastest-growing photography channels.

In 2024, The Wall Street Journal reported that Northrup was concentrating on the YouTube channel and his educational photography-book business as changes in the stock-photography market reduced opportunities for photographers.
