= Ken Zubay =

American politician

Minnesota House of Representatives
- In office 1975–1982

Personal details
- Born: Kenneth Peter Zubay; June 22, 1924 Endicott, New York
- Died: March 14, 2010 (aged 85) Rochester, Minnesota
- Party: Republican
- Education: Union-Endicott High School (1942)

Military service

Kenneth Peter Zubay (June 22, 1924 – March 14, 2010) was an American businessman and politician.

Zubay was born in Endicott, New York. He graduated from Union-Endicott High School in 1942. Zubay served in the United States Navy during World War II, in the ship repair facility. in Norfolk, Virginia. He also went to vocational school and took management training courses. Zubay worked for IBM. He moved with his wife and family to Rochester, Minnesota in 1956 and continued to work for IBM as an executive and tool maker. Zubac served in the Minnesota House of Representatives from 1975 to 1982 and was a Republican. Zubay died at the Methodist Hospital in Rochester, Minnesota.
