= Gerald McCarthy (footballer) =

Australian rules footballer (born 1951)

Personal information
- Full name: Gerald Thomas McCarthy
- Born: 2 November 1951 (age 75)
- Original team: Ashburton YCW
- Height: 191 cm (6 ft 3 in)
- Weight: 92 kg (203 lb)

Playing career^{1}
| Years | Club | Games (Goals) |
| 1972–1977 | Hawthorn | 75 (18) |
| 1978–1982 | Fitzroy | 75 (23) |
| Total | | 150 (41) |
- ^{1} Playing statistics correct to the end of 1982.

Gerald "Gerry" McCarthy (born 2 November 1951) is a former Australian rules footballer who played with Hawthorn and Fitzroy in the Victorian Football League (VFL).

McCarthy, recruited from Ashburton YCW, played most of his football as a defender. He appeared in five finals for Hawthorn, but never got to play in a grand final, missing out on selection in both 1975 and 1976.

He was traded to Fitzroy at the end of the 1977 VFL season, in exchange for Terry Wallace, who was residential bound to Fitzroy but hadn't played any VFL football for them.
