= Arthur Jones (American football) =

American football player (1986–2025)

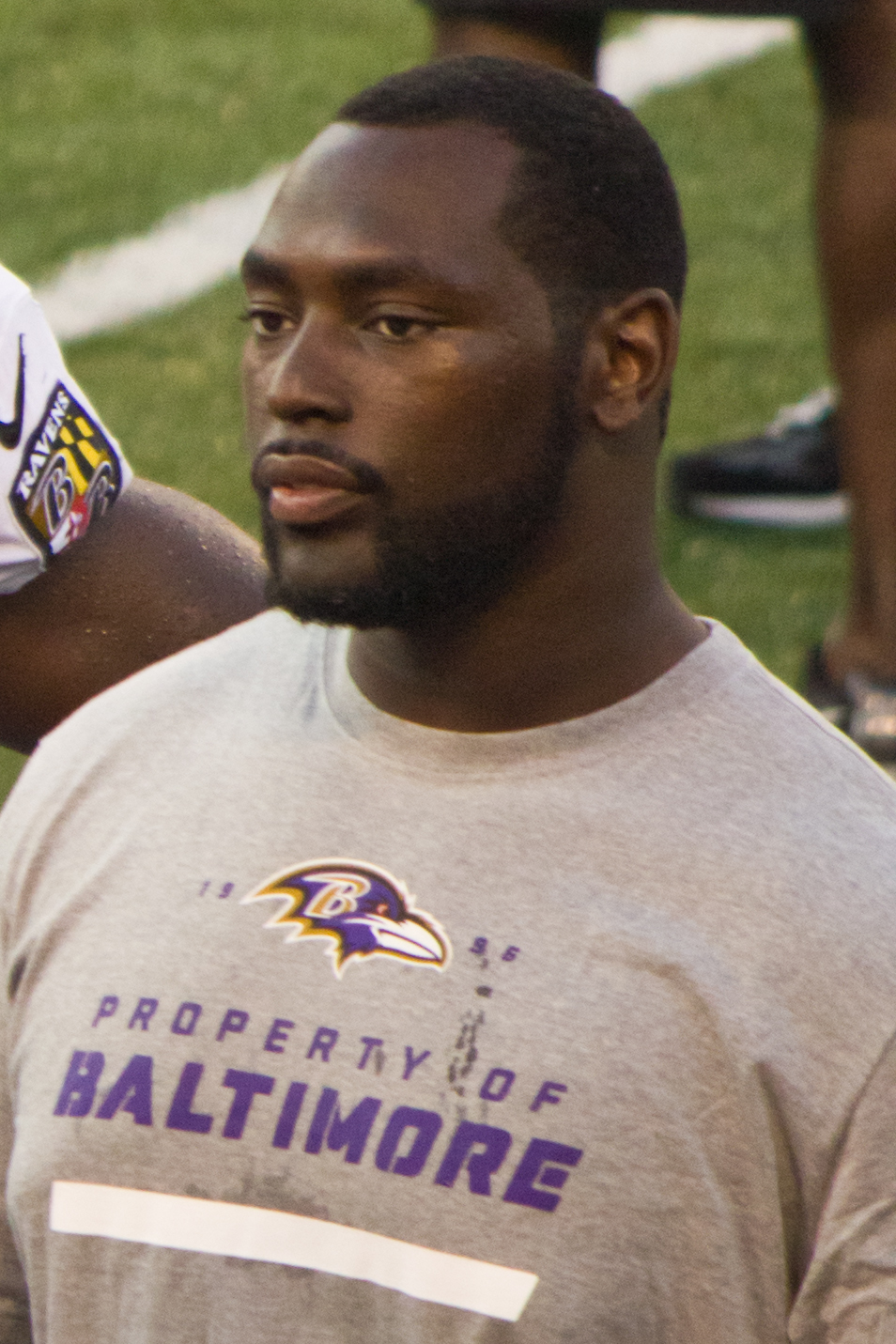
- Jones with the Baltimore Ravens in 2012

No. 67, 97, 96
- Position: Defensive tackle

Personal information
- Born: June 3, 1986; Rochester, New York, U.S.
- Died: October 3, 2025 (aged 39); Pompey, New York, U.S.
- Listed height: 6 ft 3 in (1.91 m)
- Listed weight: 320 lb (145 kg)

Career information
- High school: Union-Endicott (Endicott, New York)
- College: Syracuse (2005–2009)
- NFL draft: 2010: 5th round, 157th overall pick

Career history
- Baltimore Ravens (2010–2013); Indianapolis Colts (2014–2016); Washington Redskins (2017)

Awards and highlights
- Super Bowl champion (XLVII); 2× First-team All-Big East (2008, 2009); Second-team All-Big East (2007)

Career NFL statistics
- Total tackles: 173
- Sacks: 10
- Forced fumbles: 2
- Stats at Pro Football Reference

Arthur Willis Jones III (June 3, 1986 – October 3, 2025) was an American professional football player who was a defensive end for eight seasons in the National Football League (NFL). He played college football for the Syracuse Orange. He was selected by the Baltimore Ravens in the fifth round of the 2010 NFL draft and won Super Bowl XLVII with them. Jones also played for the Indianapolis Colts and Washington Redskins. He was also the older brother of former UFC light heavyweight and heavyweight champion Jon Jones and defensive end Chandler Jones.

== Early life ==
Jones was born in Rochester, New York, on June 3, 1986, to Arthur and Camille Jones. After moving to Endicott, Jones attended Union–Endicott High School. At Union–Endicott he was on both the football and wrestling teams. He was a two time NY state champ in wrestling. As a senior, he had 64 tackles, six sacks, and one fumble recovery to help lead Union–Endicott to a Section IV championship. Following that championship season, Jones was ranked as the 18th best prospect in New York by SuperPrep.

Considered only a two-star recruit by Rivals.com, Jones was not ranked among the nation's best defensive tackle prospects. He chose Syracuse over Pittsburgh and Rutgers.

College recruiting
Name	Hometown	School	Height	Weight	40^{‡}	Commit date
Arthur Jones; Defensive tackle	Endicott, New York	Union Endicott High School	6 ft 3 in (1.91 m)	280 lb (130 kg)	5.3	Aug 20, 2004
Arthur Jones; Defensive tackle	Recruit ratings: Scout: Rivals:					
Overall recruit ranking: Scout: 65 (DT) Rivals: – (DT), – (NY)
‡ Refers to 40-yard dash; Note: In many cases, Scout, Rivals, 247Sports, On3, and ESPN may conflict in their listings of height, weight and 40 time.; In these cases, the average was taken. ESPN grades are on a 100-point scale.; Sources: "Syracuse Football Commitments". Rivals.; "2005 Syracuse Football Recruiting Commits". Scout.; "Scout.com Team Recruiting Rankings". Scout.; "2005 Team Ranking". Rivals.com.

== College career ==
In 2005, as a true freshman at Syracuse University, Jones was redshirted. Jones played more regularly in 2006. In a 34–14 win over Miami (Ohio), Jones sacked their quarterback, Daniel Raudabaugh, for a loss of seven yards. On November 11, 2006, in a game at Raymond James Stadium home of the South Florida Bulls, Jones recovered the first fumble of his collegiate career. In the same game he made five tackles. After playing in every game of the 2006 season, Jones had 15 tackles (including sacks) and one fumble recovery.

The following year, against Illinois, after Jones made a tackle on third down, Post-Standard blogger and local radio host Brent Axe wrote, "Arthur Jones is having the game of his life right now." As of October 21, 2007, Jones had five tackles for a loss. As of November 2, Jones had 14.5 tackles after the ball carrier crossed the line of scrimmage. In the beginning of the second half against South Florida on November 11, Jones injured his ankle on a chop block. On November 17, Jones was held out of the game against Connecticut and according to coach Greg Robinson the decision came because, "Arthur has been too good of a football player for us to risk putting him out there and really getting him hurt." For the season, he played in every game but the Connecticut game and was named second-team All-Big East. His season high in tackles came against Iowa when he had nine.

On September 10, 2008, against Penn State, Jones had one sack and three tackles for a loss. After one month, Jones had four sacks to be one of the leaders for the Orange. After the 2008 season, Jones was named to the first-team All-Big East Conference and was an All-America candidate. Jones was one of only 10 players on the team to start every game. His season high in tackles came against Rutgers when he had eight. Following Syracuse's upset win over Notre Dame he was named Big East Defensive Player of the Week and was also awarded an ESPN Helmet Sticker for his performance. He ranks sixth on the Orange career record list for tackles for loss.

In 2009, Jones missed three games, playing in nine and made 19 tackles (7 for losses) and 1.5 sacks and recovered 2 fumbles and was named first-team All-Big East for the second consecutive season.

== Professional career ==
=== Pre-draft ===
Pre-draft measurables
Height	Weight	Arm length	Hand span	40-yard dash	Bench press
6 ft 3 1/4 in (1.91 m)	301 lb (137 kg)	35 1/4 in (0.90 m)	10 1/4 in (0.26 m)	5.06 s	30 reps
All values from NFL Combine/Pro Day

He was considered as one of the top senior defensive tackles for the 2010 NFL Draft.

=== Baltimore Ravens ===
Jones was selected by the Baltimore Ravens in the fifth round of the 2010 NFL draft with the 157th overall pick. He was signed to a three-year deal on June 21, 2010. During his rookie season, Jones he made a position switch from 4-3 defensive tackle to 3-4 defensive end. He played 2 games without a single stat. Jones saw an increased role in the 2011 season by playing 14 games with one start, making 20 tackles. During the 2012 season, Jones had 4.5 sacks in the regular season. The Ravens advanced to Super Bowl XLVII for the second time in franchise history against the San Francisco 49ers. In that game, Jones registered one fumble recovery as well as a key sack of 49ers quarterback Colin Kaepernick. The Ravens ended up winning the game 34–31, earning Jones his first and only Super Bowl ring. In 2013, Jones played 16 games (started 6) with 4.5 sacks on 27 solo tackles.

=== Indianapolis Colts ===
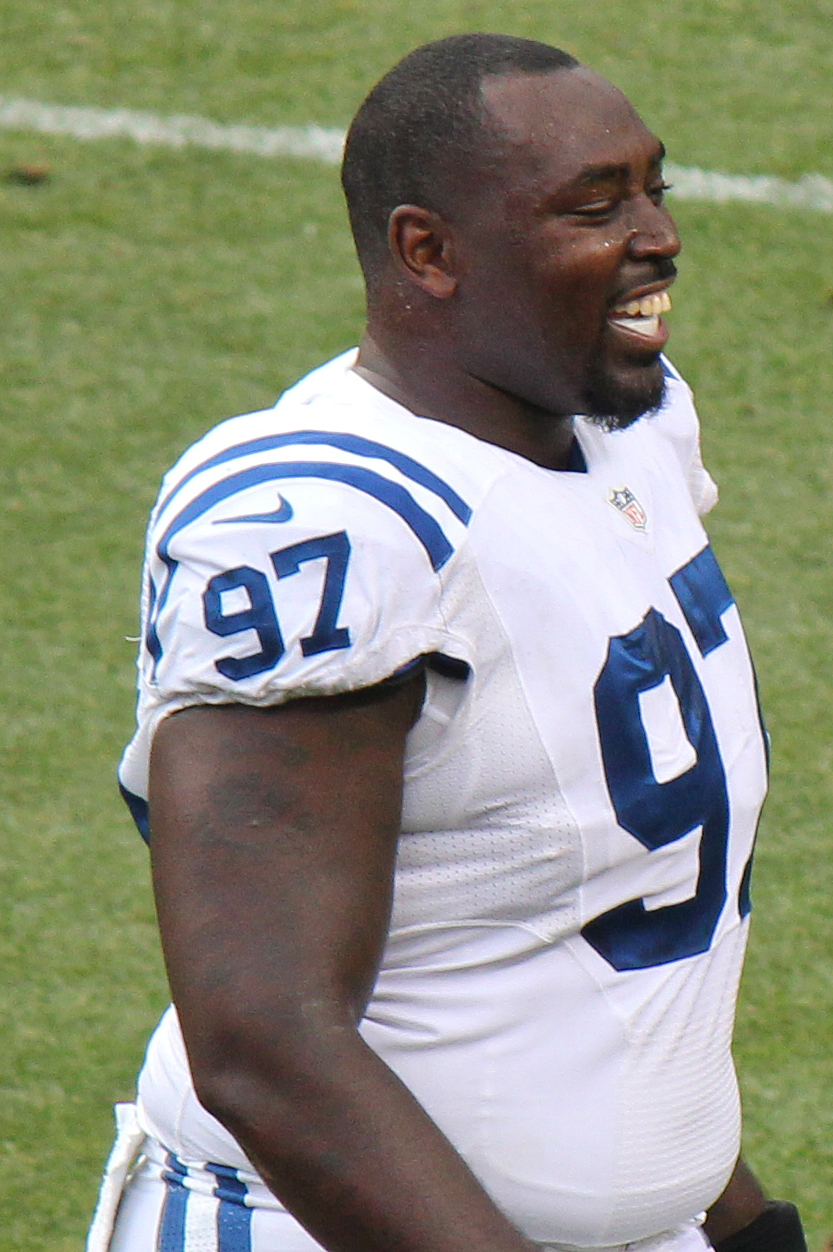
Jones with the Colts in 2014

On March 11, 2014, Jones signed a 5-year contract with the Indianapolis Colts, worth more than $30 million. During his first season with the Colts in 2014, Jones played 9 games (started 3) with 1.5 sacks and a forced fumble on 34 tackles. On September 5, 2015, Jones was placed on injured reserve for an ankle injury.

Jones was suspended the first four games of the 2016 season for violating the league's policy on performance enhancing drugs. After returning from his suspension, Jones started all eight games he appeared in and tallied 30 tackles before being placed on injured reserve on December 19, 2016, with a groin injury. On March 24, 2017, Jones was released by the Colts.

=== Washington Redskins ===
On November 1, 2017, Jones signed with the Washington Redskins. He was placed on injured reserve on November 11, 2017, with a dislocated shoulder.

After the 2017 season ended, Jones announced his retirement via Instagram.

== NFL career statistics ==
Legend
	Won the Super Bowl
**Bold**	Career high

=== Regular season ===
Year	Team	Games		Tackles					Interceptions					Fumbles			
Year	Team	GP	GS	Cmb	Solo	Ast	Sck	TFL	Int	Yds	TD	Lng	PD	FF	FR	Yds	TD
2010	BAL	2	0	0	0	0	0.0	0	0	0	0	0	0	0	0	0	0
2011	BAL	14	1	20	14	6	0.0	0	0	0	0	0	0	0	0	0	0
2012	BAL	16	6	47	27	20	**4.5**	5	0	0	0	0	0	**1**	0	0	0
2013	BAL	14	13	**53**	**28**	**25**	4.0	**8**	0	0	0	0	0	0	0	0	0
2014	IND	9	3	23	15	8	1.5	3	0	0	0	0	0	**1**	0	0	0
2016	IND	8	8	30	15	15	0.0	1	0	0	0	0	0	0	0	0	0
2017	WAS	1	0	0	0	0	0.0	0	0	0	0	0	0	0	0	0	0
		64	31	173	99	74	10	17	0	0	0	0	0	2	0	0	0

=== Playoffs ===
Year	Team	Games		Tackles					Interceptions					Fumbles			
Year	Team	GP	GS	Cmb	Solo	Ast	Sck	TFL	Int	Yds	TD	Lng	PD	FF	FR	Yds	TD
2011	BAL	2	0	1	0	1	0.0	0	0	0	0	0	0	0	0	0	0
2012	BAL	4	2	9	**5**	4	**1.0**	**1**	0	0	0	0	0	0	**2**	0	0
2014	IND	3	3	**11**	4	**7**	0.0	0	0	0	0	0	0	0	0	0	0
		9	5	21	9	12	1.0	1	0	0	0	0	0	0	2	0	0

== Personal life and death ==
Jones earned his degree from Syracuse in communication and rhetorical studies. His brother is former mixed martial artist Jon Jones, who was UFC Light Heavyweight and Heavyweight Champion. His youngest brother, Chandler, was a defensive end in the NFL for 12 seasons, playing for the New England Patriots, Arizona Cardinals and Las Vegas Raiders. Their teams played one another for the first time when the Ravens defeated the Patriots in Week 3 of the 2012 NFL season, and again in the 2012 AFC Championship Game, also won by Arthur and the Ravens.

Jones had a son, Arthur Jones IV, who also plays football and received a scholarship offer from Syracuse as part of the 2028 recruiting class.

Jones died on October 3, 2025, at his home in Pompey, New York, at the age of 39. According to 911 dispatches, the defibrillator in Jones's home was activated, prompting an automatic fire and ambulance response, although his exact cause of death has yet to be released.
