= Chandler Jones =

American football player (born 1990)

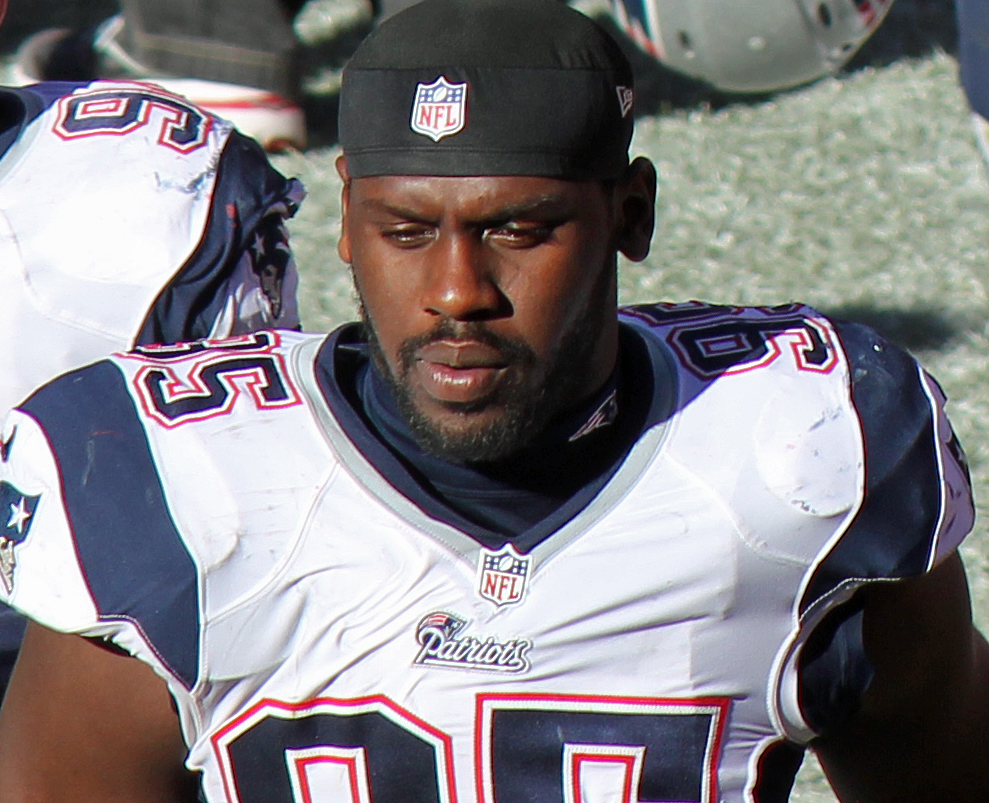
- Jones with the New England Patriots in 2013

No. 95, 55
- Position: Defensive end

Personal information
- Born: February 27, 1990 (age 36); Rochester, New York, U.S.
- Listed height: 6 ft 5 in (1.96 m)
- Listed weight: 265 lb (120 kg)

Career information
- High school: Union-Endicott (Endicott, New York)
- College: Syracuse (2008–2011)
- NFL draft: 2012: 1st round, 21st overall pick

Career history
- New England Patriots (2012–2015); Arizona Cardinals (2016–2021); Las Vegas Raiders (2022–2023)

Awards and highlights
- Super Bowl champion (XLIX); 2× First-team All-Pro (2017, 2019); 4× Pro Bowl (2015, 2017, 2019, 2021); Deacon Jones Award (2017); NFL forced fumbles co-leader (2019); NFL 2010s All-Decade Team; Butkus Award (pro) (2019); PFWA All-Rookie Team (2012); New England Patriots All-2010s Team; 2× First-team All-Big East (2010, 2011)

Career NFL statistics
- Total tackles: 511
- Sacks: 112
- Forced fumbles: 34
- Fumble recoveries: 13
- Pass deflections: 30
- Interceptions: 1
- Touchdowns: 3
- Stats at Pro Football Reference

Chandler James Jones (born February 27, 1990) is an American former professional football player who was a defensive end in the National Football League (NFL) for 12 seasons. He played college football for the Syracuse Orange and was selected by the New England Patriots in the first round of the 2012 NFL draft. He also played for the Arizona Cardinals and the Las Vegas Raiders.

Jones is the younger brother of former UFC heavyweight champion and former UFC light heavyweight champion Jon Jones and former NFL player Arthur Jones.

== Early life ==
Jones was born in Rochester, New York, to parents Arthur Jr. and Camille Jones. Jones attended Union-Endicott High School, where he played high school football. He was a 2007 SuperPrep All-Northeast and PrepStar All-East Region selection. Jones was ranked as the eighth-best prospect of the state of New York by Scout.com.

College recruiting
Name	Hometown	School	Height	Weight	40^{‡}	Commit date
Chandler Jones; Defensive end	Endicott, New York	Union-Endicott High School	6 ft 6 in (1.98 m)	235 lb (107 kg)	4.95	Oct 29, 2007
Chandler Jones; Defensive end	Recruit ratings: Scout: Rivals:					
Overall recruit ranking: Scout: 50 Rivals: 48
‡ Refers to 40-yard dash; Note: In many cases, Scout, Rivals, 247Sports, On3, and ESPN may conflict in their listings of height, weight and 40 time.; In these cases, the average was taken. ESPN grades are on a 100-point scale.; Sources: "Syracuse Football Commitments". Rivals.; "2008 Syracuse Football Recruiting Commits". Scout.; "Scout.com Team Recruiting Rankings". Scout.; "2008 Team Ranking". Rivals.com.

== College career ==
Jones attended and played college football at Syracuse University from 2008 to 2011. After not playing as a freshman for the Orange in 2008, he appeared in 12 games as a sophomore. He totaled 52 combined tackles and 1.5 sacks. As a junior in 2010, he recorded 57 total tackles, four sacks, four passes defensed, and three forced fumbles. As a senior in 2011, Jones played in only seven games due to injury, but still was an All-Big East selection after recording 39 tackles and 4.5 sacks.

On December 30, 2011, Jones announced that he would enter the 2012 NFL draft.

Jones left the university one class short of graduating. He finally completed his degree at Syracuse in 2020, graduating with a bachelor's in child and family studies.

== Professional career ==
=== Pre-draft ===
Pre-draft measurables
Height	Weight	Arm length	Hand span	Wingspan	40-yard dash	10-yard split	20-yard split	20-yard shuttle	Three-cone drill	Vertical jump	Broad jump	Bench press
6 ft 5 3/8 in (1.97 m)	266 lb (121 kg)	35 1/2 in (0.90 m)	9 3/4 in (0.25 m)	7 ft 1 3/4 in (2.18 m)	4.87 s	1.69 s	2.86 s	4.38 s	7.07 s	35.0 in (0.89 m)	10 ft 0 in (3.05 m)	22 reps
All values from NFL Combine

Jones was considered one of the best defensive end prospects for the 2012 NFL draft.

=== New England Patriots ===
==== 2012 ====
Jones was selected by the New England Patriots in the first round with the 21st overall selection. He was the highest selected player from Syracuse since defensive end Dwight Freeney in 2002. On May 23, 2012, Jones signed a four-year contract with the Patriots.

As a rookie, Jones was immediately thrust into the starting right defensive end slot for the Patriots in 2012. In Week 1 against the Tennessee Titans, Jones strip-sacked quarterback Jake Locker, with fellow rookie teammate Dont'a Hightower recovering the ball and returning it for a touchdown. A week later Jones sacked Arizona Cardinals quarterback Kevin Kolb, forcing a fumble that was recovered by the Patriots.

In Week 6 against the Seattle Seahawks, Jones recorded two sacks on quarterback Russell Wilson and managed to provide some good pressure on the Seahawks offensive line, forcing one fumble in that game. Jones made his sixth career sack in Week 8 against the St. Louis Rams by dropping Sam Bradford to the turf in London, England. In 14 games (13 starts) of his rookie season in 2012, Jones produced 45 tackles, six sacks, five passes defended, and three forced fumbles. He was named to the PFWA All-Rookie Team.

==== 2013 ====
In a game against the Baltimore Ravens, quarterback Tyrod Taylor fumbled the snap and Jones recovered it in the end zone for the first touchdown of his career. Jones started all 16 games in 2013 recording 42 tackles with 11.5 sacks, 1 forced fumble, and a fumble recovery returned for a touchdown.

==== 2014 ====
For the season, Jones recorded 43 tackles and six sacks in 10 games. In Week 2, against the Minnesota Vikings, Jones recorded two sacks; he also blocked a field goal and returned it for a touchdown in the 30–7 victory. He earned AFC Defensive Player of the Week for his game against Minnesota. On February 1, 2015, he won his first Super Bowl ring when the Patriots defeated the Seattle Seahawks by a score of 28–24 in Super Bowl XLIX. He had one sack and three tackles in the victory.

==== 2015 ====
On April 30, 2015, the Patriots picked up the option on Jones' contract. Through the first eight games, Jones racked up 9.5 sacks, including two in an October 29 win over the Miami Dolphins on Thursday Night Football to help the Patriots move to 7–0. Jones finished the regular season with a team-leading 12.5 sacks, a new career high, as well as his first career interception. He was ranked 48th by his fellow players on the NFL Top 100 Players of 2016.

Six days before the Patriots took on the Kansas City Chiefs in the AFC Divisional Round, Jones was hospitalized after showing up at the Foxborough Public Safety Building in a disoriented but cooperative state. Later reports indicated that he had experienced a bad reaction to synthetic marijuana, a legal drug under Massachusetts law. Jones still played in the following Divisional Round playoff game against the Kansas City Chiefs and the AFC Championship against the Denver Broncos.

=== Arizona Cardinals ===
On March 15, 2016, Jones was traded to the Arizona Cardinals for Jonathan Cooper and a second round pick in the 2016 NFL draft.

==== 2016 ====
In 2016, Jones started all 16 games for the Cardinals, recording 49 tackles, 11 sacks, three passes defensed and four forced fumbles. He was also ranked 85th on the NFL Top 100 Players of 2017.

==== 2017 ====
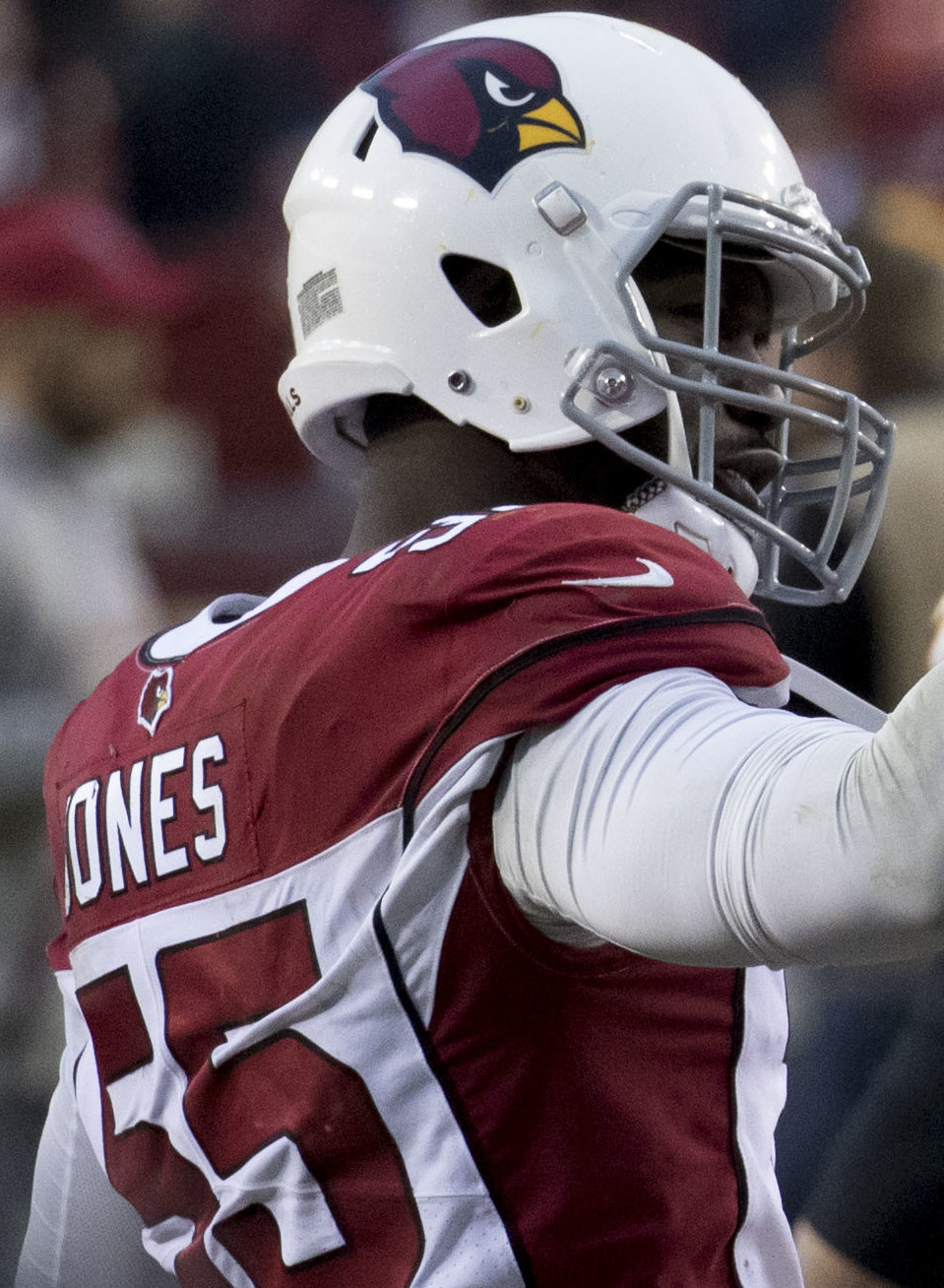
Jones with the Arizona Cardinals in 2017

On February 27, 2017, the Cardinals placed the non-exclusive franchise tag on Jones. On March 10, 2017, he signed a five-year, $82.5 million contract extension with the Cardinals. On December 19, 2017, he was named to his second Pro Bowl and earned first team All-Pro honors. Jones finished the season leading the league with 17.0 sacks, which set a new Cardinals' franchise record. He finished third in Defensive Player of the Year voting. He was ranked 28th by his fellow players on the NFL Top 100 Players of 2018.

==== 2018 ====
In 2018, Jones was moved to defensive end as new Cardinals head coach Steve Wilks implemented a 4–3 defense. In Week 5, Jones recorded a sack, pass breakup, three tackles for loss, a forced fumble and recovery in a 28–18 win over the San Francisco 49ers, earning him NFC Defensive Player of the Week. He finished the season with 49 tackles, 13 sacks, four passes defensed, and three forced fumbles. His 13 sacks led the team and were tied for seventh in the league.

==== 2019 ====
During Week 3 against the Carolina Panthers, Jones sacked Kyle Allen twice in the 38–20 loss. During a Week 7 27–21 road victory over the New York Giants, he sacked rookie Daniel Jones four times, one of which resulted in a forced fumble which he recovered. Jones was named the NFC Defensive Player of the Week for his performance. During Week 16 against the Seattle Seahawks, Jones sacked Russell Wilson four times and forced a fumble on David Moore which was recovered by teammate Jordan Hicks during the 27–13 road victory. He earned a second NFC Defensive Player of the Week nomination for his game against Seattle.

Jones finished the season with 53 tackles and set career-highs in sacks with 19, forced fumbles with eight, fumble recoveries with three, pass deflections with five. He was named to his third Pro Bowl and earned first team All-Pro honors. He was also the runner-up for Defensive Player of the Year. He was ranked 15th by his fellow players on the NFL Top 100 Players of 2020. He was named to the Pro Football Hall of Fame's All-2010s team.

==== 2020 ====
In Week 1 against the San Francisco 49ers, Jones recorded his first and only sack of the season on Jimmy Garoppolo during the 24–20 win. In Week 5, he suffered a torn bicep and was placed on injured reserve on October 15, 2020.

==== 2021 ====
In Week 1 against the Tennessee Titans, Jones finished with five sacks as the Cardinals won 38–13. His performance tied the franchise single game sack record, and he was named NFC Defensive Player of the Week. In Week 11, Jones had four tackles, two sacks, and a forced fumble in a 23–13 win over the Seattle Seahawks, earning NFC Defensive Player of the Week. He finished the season second on the team with 10.5 sacks, 41 tackles, four passes defensed, and a team-leading six forced fumbles. He was named to the Pro Bowl. He was ranked 62nd by his fellow players on the NFL Top 100 Players of 2022.

=== Las Vegas Raiders ===
==== 2022 ====
On March 17, 2022, Jones signed a three-year, $51 million contract with the Las Vegas Raiders.

In Week 13, Jones had three sacks, six tackles, two tackles for loss, and a pass breakup in a 27–20 win over the Chargers, earning AFC Defensive Player of the Week. Against his former team, the New England Patriots in Week 15, Jones made a notable play at the end of regulation. As the Patriots were attempting a lateral play to try to win the game with the score tied at 24, Jones intercepted a lateral from Jakobi Meyers intended for Mac Jones before stiff-arming the New England quarterback and running the ball in for the game-winning touchdown. Because Meyers' pass was a backwards pass, Jones' touchdown was ruled a fumble return instead of an interception return. The following week against the Pittsburgh Steelers, Jones suffered an elbow injury after colliding with teammate Maxx Crosby while attempting to sack Kenny Pickett and was carted off the field. He was later placed on injured reserve, ending his season. He finished the 2022 season with 4.5 sacks, 38 combined tackles, three passes defended, a forced fumble, and three fumble recoveries, including the 48-yard fumble return touchdown.

==== 2023 ====
On September 5, 2023, Jones posted on his personal Instagram account that he no longer wanted to play for the Raiders after apparently being locked out of the Raiders' facility and was forced to work out at a local gym. When asked to comment on Jones' postings, Raiders head coach Josh McDaniels stated Jones was dealing with a personal situation and that it was a private matter. On September 23, the Raiders placed Jones on the non-football illness list. Following an arrest, he was released on September 30.

== Career statistics ==
Legend
	Won the Super Bowl
	Led the league
**Bold**	Career high

=== NFL ===
==== Regular season ====
Year	Team	Games		Tackles					Fumbles				Interceptions					
Year	Team	GP	GS	Cmb	Solo	Ast	Sck	TFL	FF	FR	Yds	TD	PD	Int	Yds	Avg	Lng	TD
2012	NE	14	13	45	24	21	6.0	8	3	0	–	–	4	0	–	–	–	–
2013	NE	16	16	**79**	40	**39**	11.5	14	1	1	0	**1**	0	0	–	–	–	–
2014	NE	10	8	43	30	13	6.0	5	2	1	0	0	2	0	–	–	–	–
2015	NE	15	15	44	31	31	12.5	11	4	0	–	–	1	**1**	0	0.0	0	0
2016	ARI	16	16	49	39	11	11.0	15	4	2	0	0	3	0	–	–	–	–
2017	ARI	16	16	59	**52**	7	17.0	**28**	2	0	–	–	3	0	–	–	–	–
2018	ARI	16	16	49	38	11	13.0	13	3	1	0	0	4	0	–	–	–	–
2019	ARI	16	16	53	42	11	**19.0**	11	**8**	**3**	0	0	**5**	0	–	–	–	–
2020	ARI	5	5	11	5	6	1.0	1	0	1	0	0	0	0	–	–	–	–
2021	ARI	15	15	41	31	10	10.5	12	6	1	1	0	4	0	–	–	–	–
2022	LV	15	15	38	21	17	4.5	3	1	**3**	**48**	**1**	3	0	–	–	–	–
2023	LV	0	0	Did not play														
Total		154	151	511	352	159	112.0	121	34	13	49	2	30	1	0	0.0	0	0

==== Postseason ====
Year	Team	Games		Tackles					Fumbles				Interceptions					
Year	Team	GP	GS	Cmb	Solo	Ast	Sck	TFL	FF	FR	Yds	TD	PD	Int	Yds	Avg	Lng	TD
2012	NE	2	1	2	1	1	0.0	0	0	0	–	–	0	0	–	–	–	–
2013	NE	2	2	3	2	1	0.0	0	0	0	–	–	0	0	–	–	–	–
2014	NE	3	3	8	**7**	1	**1.0**	1	0	0	–	–	0	0	–	–	–	–
2015	NE	2	2	5	3	2	**1.0**	1	**1**	0	–	–	0	0	–	–	–	–
2021	ARI	1	1	**9**	6	**3**	0.0	**2**	0	0	–	–	0	0	–	–	–	–
Total		10	9	27	19	8	2.0	4	1	0	0	0	0	0	0	0.0	0	0

=== College ===
Season	Team	Conf	Class	Pos	GP	Tackles					Interceptions					Fumbles			
Season	Team	Conf	Class	Pos	GP	Solo	Ast	Cmb	TfL	Sck	Int	Yds	Avg	TD	PD	FF	FR	Yds	TD
2009	Syracuse	Big East	SO	DL	12	33	**19**	52	**10.0**	1.5	0	0	0	0	0	0	0	0	0
2010	Syracuse	Big East	JR	DL	13	**38**	**19**	**57**	9.5	4.0	0	0	0	0	**4**	**3**	0	0	0
2011	Syracuse	Big East	SR	DL	7	30	8	38	7.5	**4.5**	**1**	**32**	**32.0**	0	0	0	0	0	0
Career					32	101	46	147	27.0	10.0	1	32	32.0	0	4	3	0	0	0

== Personal life ==
Jones is the youngest of his siblings. His eldest brother, Arthur, was a former defensive end in the NFL. His other brother, Jon, is a former mixed martial artist who was a heavyweight and light heavyweight champion when competing for the UFC. His oldest sister Carmen died in 2000. Jones graduated from Syracuse in 2012.

=== 2023 hospitalization and arrests ===
On September 7, 2023, Jones stated on social media that a Crisis Response Team (CRT) member from Las Vegas Fire & Rescue came to his home. Jones accused Las Vegas Raiders management of sending the CRT member. On September 26, Jones announced that the previous day the fire department admitted him into a hospital against his wishes and was later taken to a behavioral health center.

On September 29, Jones was arrested in Las Vegas on two counts of violating a protection order, with arraignment scheduled for December 4.

On October 17, Jones was arrested in Las Vegas again for violating a protection order, the second time in less than a month.
