= Ed Zandy =

American jazz musician

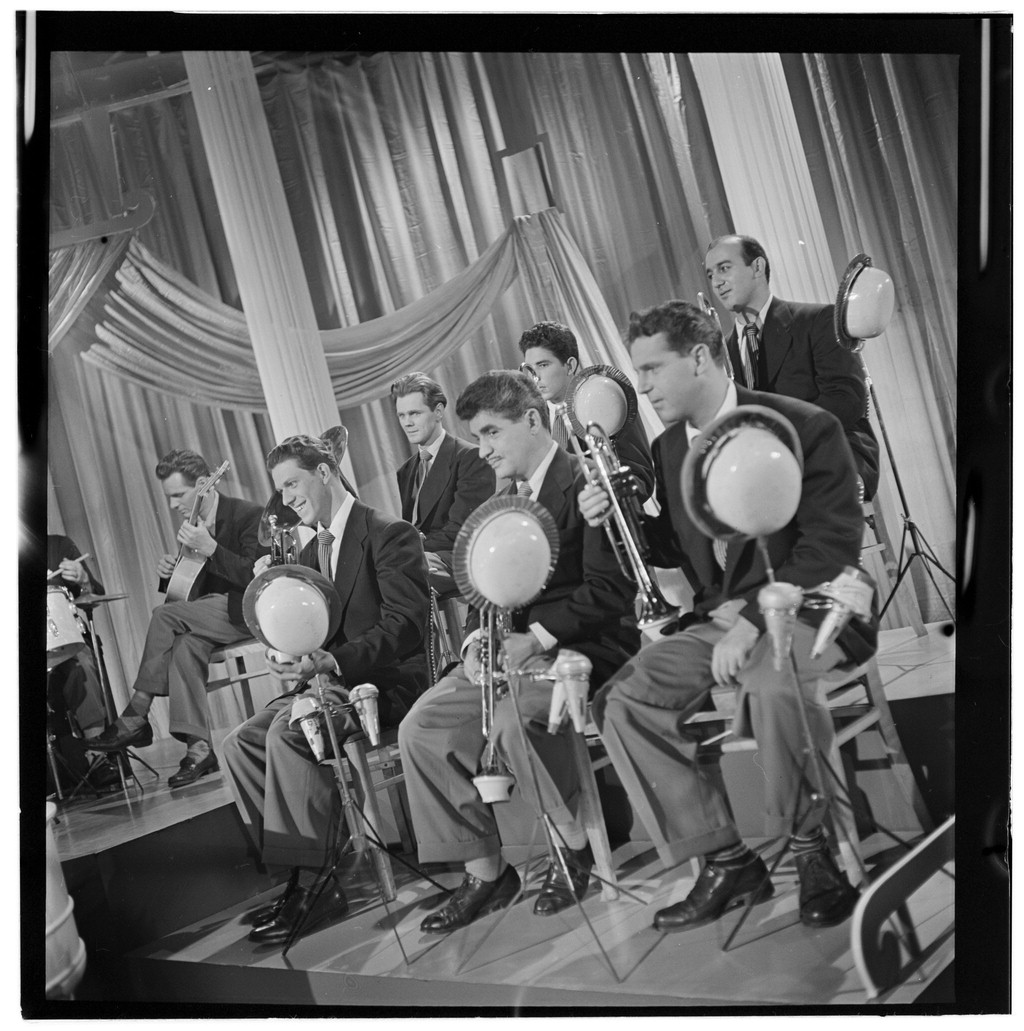
Eddie Zandy (right) with the Claude Thornhill Band in the Columbia Pictures studio, the making of Beautiful Doll, New York, N.Y., ca. Sept. 1947. Photograph by William P. Gottlieb.

Edward Eugene Zandy (March 27, 1920, in Gaffney, Pennsylvania – August 23, 2003, in Freeport, The Bahamas) was a professional trumpet player from 1938 until his death in 2003. He was best known as a member of the second Glenn Miller Orchestra, led by Tex Beneke, Ray McKinley and Buddy DeFranco. In addition to the Glenn Miller Orchestra, he also played with the Ina Ray Hutton, Claude Thornhill, Skitch Henderson and Gene Krupa bands. Zandy moved permanently to The Bahamas in 1968, living initially in Nassau and then Freeport, where he played in casino and hotel bands. One of his last performances was with the Apple Elliot Ensemble in The Bahamas.

In a band review of Tex Beneke, Downbeat magazine editors wrote, “…the brass section plays cleanly, too, boasting one superior soloist in the boppish trumpet of Eddie Zandy.”

Metronome magazine praised the “...Hackett-like (Bobby Hackett) but more modern trumpeting of Eddie Zandy”.

Zandy was born on March 27, 1920, in Gaffney, Pennsylvania, but moved to Endicott, New York, early in his childhood. He was a graduate of Union-Endicott High School, and a US Army veteran of World War II, serving in the Pacific Theater. He was a lifetime member of Associated Musicians of Greater New York, Local 802 AFM. Zandy died on August 23, 2003, in Freeport, The Bahamas.

== Chronology ==
- Born Ettore Zandegiacomo Mazzon on March 27, 1920, in Gaffney, Pennsylvania. Moved to Endicott, New York where he was raised, graduating from Union-Endicott High School in 1938.
- 1936–1939 – Red Henderson Band (Endicott, NY), Len Fennell Orchestra, the house band at George F. Johnson Pavilion (Johnson City, NY)
- 1940–1942 – traveled to New York City with Tamer Aswad (later known as Stuart Foster) to join the AFM local 802 and the Ina Ray Hutton Orchestra
- 1942–1945 – US Army, Pacific – While stationed in Tokyo in August 1945, formed and led Ed Zandy and the Modernaires; a jazz combo and big band made up of members of the 233rd AGF Band, the 1st American group to entertain on Radio Tokyo. They also produced a weekly 30 minute program entitled Studies in Syncopation for the Armed Forces Radio Network. It aired on Tuesday evenings and was broadcast from the Radio Tokyo studios.
- 1946 – played in Ina Ray Hutton and Bobby Byrne bands. Did 3 days with Benny Goodman and filled in for six weeks with Gene Krupa.
- 1947–1948 – played in Claude Thornhill band
- 1948–1950 – played with Skitch Henderson Orchestra
- 1950 – played with George Paxton Orchestra
- 1950 – played with the Glen Gray & Casa Loma Orchestra
- 1951–1956 – played with Tex Beneke and the 2nd Glenn Miller Orchestra
- 1956– played with Claude Thornhill, Larry Sonn, and Leroy Holmes bands
- 1956–1967 – played with Ray McKinley and the New Glenn Miller Orchestra (band led by Bobby Hackett in 1965)
- 1967–1968 – played with Buddy DeFranco and the Glenn Miller Orchestra
- 1968–2003 – retired to Nassau, The Bahamas. Played with the Don Ragan Orchestra at El Casino on Paradise Island
- 2003 – died on August 23, 2003, in Freeport, The Bahamas, at 83 years of age
