= Joe Mott =

American football player (born 1965)

No. 51, 55
- Position: Linebacker

Personal information
- Born: October 6, 1965 (age 61); Endicott, New York, U.S.
- Listed height: 6 ft 4 in (1.93 m)
- Listed weight: 253 lb (115 kg)

Career information
- High school: Union-Endicott (Endicott, New York)
- College: Iowa
- NFL draft: 1989: 3rd round, 70th overall pick

Career history
- New York Jets (1989–1991); San Francisco 49ers (1993); Green Bay Packers (1993)

Awards and highlights
- First-team All-Big Ten (1988)

Career NFL statistics
- Fumble recoveries: 1
- Stats at Pro Football Reference

John Christopher Mott (born October 5, 1965) is an American former professional football player who was a linebacker for three seasons with the New York Jets and the Green Bay Packers of the National Football League (NFL). He was selected by the Jets in the third round of the 1989 NFL draft. He stands at 6'4" and weighs 245 pounds. He attended Union Endicott High School.

Pre-draft measurables
Height	Weight	40-yard dash	10-yard split	20-yard split	20-yard shuttle	Vertical jump
6 ft 4 in (1.93 m)	243 lb (110 kg)	4.90 s	1.68 s	2.86 s	4.13 s	29.0 in (0.74 m)
All values from NFL Combine
