= Isaiah Kacyvenski =

American football player (born 1977)

No. 58, 59
- Position: Linebacker

Personal information
- Born: October 3, 1977 (age 49); Syracuse, New York, U.S.
- Listed height: 6 ft 1 in (1.85 m)
- Listed weight: 252 lb (114 kg)

Career information
- High school: Union-Endicott (NY)
- College: Harvard (1996–1999)
- NFL draft: 2000: 4th round, 119th overall pick

Career history
- Seattle Seahawks (2000–2006); St. Louis Rams (2006); Oakland Raiders (2007)*
- * Offseason or practice squad member only

Awards and highlights
- First-team All-American (1999); Nils V. "Swede" Nelson Award (1999); Ivy League Rookie of the Year (1996); 3× First-team All-Ivy League (1997–1999); Harvard Male Athlete of the Year (2000)

Career NFL statistics
- Tackles: 290
- Sacks: 1
- Forced fumbles: 2
- Stats at Pro Football Reference

Isaiah J. Kacyvenski (/ˌkæzəˈvɪnski/ KAZ-ə-VIN-skee; born October 3, 1977) is an American former professional football player who was a linebacker in the National Football League (NFL). He was selected by the Seattle Seahawks in the fourth round of the 2000 NFL draft. He played college football for the Harvard Crimson and earned an MBA from Harvard Business School after he retired.

Kacyvenski also spent time with the St. Louis Rams and Oakland Raiders. After spending the 2007 season out of football trying to return from microfracture surgery, Kacyvenski officially announced his retirement in 2008.

Kacyvenski is currently the Founder and Managing Partner of Will Ventures, a venture capital fund focused on sports technology opening up large, adjacent markets.

== Early life ==
Kacyvenski was the youngest of five children growing up in upstate Endicott, New York. He grew up at times homeless and without food with his parents; his caring mother and his alcoholic and sometimes abusive father until their divorce when he was nine. When he was thirteen, his mother left to do missionary work, leaving the care of him and his siblings back with their father, now sober.

Kacyvenski attended Union-Endicott High School where he was an honors student and served as captain of the football team. As a high school wrestler, he was defeated by Morlon Greenwood of Freeport High School for the state championship in the 215-lb. class. His ultimate goal was to earn a football scholarship to University of Notre Dame to play with the Fighting Irish. His mother was killed by a truck as she walked along the road on the same day of Kacyvenski's biggest high school football game in his senior season. Upon hearing of his mother's death, he fell "to his knees crying." He ended up playing in the game that night, calling it one of the best games of his life.

He received a phone call at the end of his senior year from Harvard Crimson football coach Tim Murphy offering him an academic scholarship. While Kacyvenski was reluctant to go to for fear of not fitting in, his coach convinced him that he would never regret going to Harvard.

== College career ==
While he was a freshman at Harvard, Kacyvenski came across items that belonged to his mother. Among the items he found a picture of his mother wearing a Harvard sweatshirt and her Bible with a passage highlighted: "Can a woman forget her own baby and not love the child she bore? Even if a mother should forget her child, I will never forget you. I can never forget you! I have written you in the palm of my hands." – Isaiah 49:15. Kacyvenski took these things as signs that he was making the right decision in his life. Coincidentally, 49 was also the jersey number he had been randomly assigned upon arrival at Harvard.

For four years, Kacyvenski started every game at Harvard University. As a freshman, he won the Ivy League Rookie of the Year award, and for three years, won All-Ivy League first-team honors. As a senior, he had a school single-season record 135 tackles, and for his college career, finished with a school career-record 395 tackles, 4.5 sacks, 11 interceptions, and 8 fumble recoveries. He received the Nils V. "Swede" Nelson Award given to "best, most academically talented" football player in New England, and also the Harvard University Male Athlete of the Year following his senior season. Isaiah was a finalist for the Buck Buchanan Award that is given to the top 1-AA defensive player in the country, as well as a 1st Team Associated Press All-American.

In 2000, Kacyvenski was selected in the 4th round of the NFL draft by the Seattle Seahawks and became the highest draft pick in Harvard history. He graduated cum laude with a pre-med degree, but elected to miss his commencement ceremony to attend the first days of football training camp. His father attended the ceremony in cap and gown in Kacyvenski's stead and received the Harvard diploma for his son.

== Professional career ==
Kacyvenski played six-plus seasons with the Seattle Seahawks recording 267 tackles in 90 games and was elected as the Special Teams Captain 3 years in a row. In 2002, Isaiah earned the starting job at Middle Linebacker, after battling for the position with Orlando Huff. In 2005, Kacyvenski was Special Teams Captain of the Seattle Seahawks and helped lead the team to Super Bowl XL, which was played in Detroit, Michigan. He was released by the team on September 30, 2006.

Kacyvenski signed a one-year contract with the St. Louis Rams on October 3, 2006, and played in ten games for them during the remainder of the 2006 season after suffering 2 concussions 3 weeks apart.

An unrestricted free agent in the 2007 offseason, Kacyvenski signed a one-year contract with the Oakland Raiders on July 11. He was placed on season-ending injured reserve on August 7 and released with an injury settlement a week later after undergoing microfracture surgery on his leg.

== NFL career statistics ==
Legend
**Bold**	Career high

=== Regular season ===
Year	Team	Games		Tackles					Interceptions					Fumbles			
Year	Team	GP	GS	Cmb	Solo	Ast	Sck	TFL	Int	Yds	TD	Lng	PD	FF	FR	Yds	TD
2000	SEA	**16**	0	28	23	5	0.0	0	**1**	0	0	0	**2**	0	**1**	0	0
2001	SEA	**16**	0	42	35	7	0.0	1	**1**	22	0	22	1	0	0	0	0
2002	SEA	9	9	72	52	20	0.0	3	**1**	**27**	0	**27**	1	0	0	0	0
2003	SEA	14	0	22	17	5	0.0	0	0	0	0	0	0	0	0	0	0
2004	SEA	**16**	**13**	**89**	**68**	**21**	**1.0**	**4**	0	0	0	0	0	**1**	0	0	0
2005	SEA	**16**	0	28	24	4	0.0	0	0	0	0	0	1	**1**	0	0	0
2006	SEA	3	0	3	3	0	0.0	0	0	0	0	0	0	0	0	0	0
2006	STL	10	0	6	5	1	0.0	0	0	0	0	0	0	0	0	0	0
		100	22	290	227	63	1.0	8	3	49	0	27	5	2	1	0	0

=== Playoffs ===
Year	Team	Games		Tackles					Interceptions					Fumbles			
Year	Team	GP	GS	Cmb	Solo	Ast	Sck	TFL	Int	Yds	TD	Lng	PD	FF	FR	Yds	TD
2003	SEA	1	0	2	2	0	0.0	0	0	0	0	0	0	0	0	0	0
2004	SEA	1	**1**	**8**	**7**	**1**	0.0	0	0	0	0	0	0	0	0	0	0
2005	SEA	**3**	0	5	4	**1**	0.0	0	0	0	0	0	0	0	0	0	0
		5	1	15	13	2	0.0	0	0	0	0	0	0	0	0	0	0

=== Retirement ===
After being released by the Raiders with an injury settlement, Kacyvenski said he wanted to return for another season in the NFL.

However, in September 2008, it was reported that Kacyvenski had decided to retire. A knee injury kept him out of the 2007 season and it was recommended by Dr. James Andrews that he not continue playing.

Also in September, Kacyvenski, the first of five other former NFL players that soon followed, agreed to donate his brain upon his death to the Center for the Study of Traumatic Encephalopathy, a joint program between the Boston University School of Medicine and Sports Legacy Institute in order to have research into the effects of concussions on the human brain performed. Kacyvenski, like many NFL players, suffered a number of concussions over the course of his playing career. At the end of 2008, Isaiah was awarded the PETA Compassionate Action Award after being the first professional athlete to donate his brain to science.

He was elected to the Board of Directors of Sports Legacy Institute in 2008, and has used this as a platform for awareness surrounding head trauma and making contact sports safer to play.

== Personal ==
Kacyvenski earned his MBA from Harvard Business School in 2011.

Isaiah is currently the Founder and Managing Partner of Will Ventures. Will Ventures is a venture capital investment fund focused on sports technology.

Prior to Will Ventures, Isaiah was a Founder and Managing Director of the Sports Innovation Lab.

Prior to founding the Sports Innovation Lab, Kacyvenski was one of the first employees to join a very early stage MC10, an electronics company, and remained there for 6 years as the Global Head of Business Development as well as Chairman of the MC10 Sports-Medicine Advisory Board.

Kacyvenski is also an individual investor in, and advisor to, several companies in technology, sports, biotech, consumer, media and sports medicine.

On the July 12, 2007, episode of The Oprah Winfrey Show, Kacyvenski appeared as the first guest to talk about his rough childhood and reconciliation with his abusive father.

Kacyvenski was featured in an NFL Films production that was nominated for an Emmy Award for Outstanding Long Feature in 2007.

On October 24, 2010, Kacyvenski was invited back to Seattle to raise the famous 12th Man Flag before the Seahawks played the Cardinals.

During his time at Harvard, Kacyvenski was roommates with Christopher Nowinski, who later went on to become a WWE wrestler. After retiring from wrestling due to concussions, Nowinski has spearheaded the effort to make sports safer in the United States and worldwide.

Among his investments, Kacyvenski is a founding investor in b.good, a chain of casual restaurants located globally.

Kacyvenski was chosen to announce the Seattle Seahawks second round draft pick from the podium during the 2013 NFL draft, one of 32 NFL Greats chosen.
