= Martin Bayne =

American journalist (1950-2020)

- Born: February 20, 1950; Binghamton, New York
- Died: November 6, 2020 (aged 70)
- Education: University of Waterloo; Massachusetts Institute of Technology
- Occupations: Activist, journalist, videographer, insurance broker (CEO New York Long-Term Care Brokers)
- Website: http://www.mrltc.com/

Martin Bayne (February 20, 1950 - November 6, 2020) was a blogger and advocate for assisted living who suffered from Parkinson's disease. Bayne was a former journalist and CEO of New York Long Term Care Brokers. After the onset of Parkinson's disease, he dedicated his time to supporting the elderly and advocating for retirement-home and assisted-living reform. Bayne was featured on NPR, The Washington Post, and The New York Times.

== Early life and education ==
Martin Bayne was born in Binghamton, New York in 1950 and died on November 6, 2020. From October 1972 to July 1976, Bayne trained as a monk at Shasta Abbey, a Soto Zen Buddhist monastery in Mt. Shasta, California. He attended the University of Waterloo in Ontario, Canada, and earned his bachelor's degree in interdisciplinary sciences in 1979. Afterward, he earned his master's degree from the Massachusetts Institute of Technology with a thesis focusing on accelerated production of human interferon from PolyI-PolyC induced fibroblasts.

== Career ==
Bayne began his career as a mutual fund broker, and worked for nearly a decade before starting his publication of Mr. Long Term Care, a newsletter devoted to long term healthcare insurance and support for those needing care services. He also founded New York Long Term Care Brokers in 1991, which became one of the largest insurance companies for long-term care coverage in the United States.

== Assisted-care and elder-care advocacy ==
Bayne was diagnosed with young-onset Parkinson's disease in 1995 at the age of 45. Several years later at the age of 53, he began staying at an assisted living facility. There, he received first-hand experience of the challenges that face residents in assisted living homes. This prompted Bayne to start his blog, The Voice of Aging Boomers, in which he wrote about his experiences and advocated reform of assisted living facilities, including improved handicap accessibility, social interaction, and available equipment.

Bayne was the author of Martin Bayne on Turning the Stream of Compassion, and published an article on assisted living in the journal Health Affairs.

Bayne advocated passionately and tirelessly for elder care.

== Awards ==
In 2013, Bayne won the American College of Health Care Administrator's Public Service Award.

== External links / Further reading ==
- Bayne, Martin (March 1999). "Development of a supported living service for people with enduring mental illness". Housing, Care and Support. 2 (1): 24–27. doi:10.1108/14608790199900007.
- Bayne, Martin (July 2012). "A room with a grim view: the 'ambient despair' that marks life in assisted living". Health Affairs. 31 (7): 1633–1635. doi:10.1377/hlthaff.2011.0440. PMID 22778352.
- Bayne, Martin (August 16, 2013). "A Soulful, Heart-Based Reinvention of Assisted Living". CCAL: Advancing Person-Centered Living.
