= Union-Endicott High School =

Location
- 1100 E. Main Street; Endicott, New York 13760; United States; 42.0977°N 76.0484°W

Information
- Type: Public
- Founded: 1915
- School district: Union-Endicott Central School District
- NCES District ID: 361071000854
- Superintendent: Nicole Wolfe
- CEEB code: 331850
- Principal: Steven DiStefano
- Teaching staff: 94.71 (FTE)
- Grades: 9–12
- Enrollment: 1,019 (2023–2024)
- Student to teacher ratio: 10.76
- Campuses: 1
- Campus type: Suburban
- Colors: Orange and black
- Fight song: Fight on U-E, On Old U-E
- Team name: Tigers
- Rivals: Vestal Senior High School
- Budget: $74,018,097 (2013–14)
- Feeder schools: Jennie F. Snapp Middle School
- Website: www.uek12.org/o/uehs
- Union-Endicott Central School District Essential Facts

Union-Endicott High School (UEHS) is a public high school located in Endicott, New York. The school, a part of the Union-Endicott Central School District, enrolls 1,280 students from 9-12 and has a student/teacher ratio of 12.8:1. Union-Endicott was listed as the 4,190th best public high school in the United States in 2021 by U.S. News & World Report on their annual list of Best High Schools in America. In the 2013–14 school year the school had an operating budget of $74,018,097. The only feeder school is Jennie F. Snapp Middle School also located in Endicott.

== History ==
Logo without mascot

Union-Endicott High School opened in 1915. During the summer of 2014, work was done to remove asbestos from the building. The initiative was part of a US$7 mil capital project that voters approved in a December 2013 referendum.

The firm of Cummings and Conrad were selected to design and build a three-story, brick school at a cost of just over $100,000. Work on the structure continued through early 1915. The builders had to contend with the farm at the rear of the property that is now Ty Cobb Stadium. They also had to put up with visitors to the adjoining Casino Park.

Ithaca architect Fred Thomas designed a new four-story addition to the school that merged elements of the original building. The new addition added 135,000 feet of space at a cost of $6.2 million. The modular design could change as needs shifted in the future. Work began in 1972, and the project was complete by 1974. The modern addition included laboratories, art and music rooms and health classrooms.

== Demographics ==
In the 2014–15 school year, the Union-Endicott student body was 53% male, 47% female, 79% White, 7% Black, 7% Hispanic, 3% Asian, 0.1% American Indian/Alaskan Native, and 5% Multiracial. There was a total enrollment of 1,165 students.

== Notable alumni ==
- Tony Matisi (class of 1934) – NFL player
- Julius Battista (class of 1937) – football player
- Ed Zandy (class of c. 1938) – musician with Glenn Miller Band
- Mitchell Olenski (class of 1940) – NFL player
- Ken Zubay (class of 1942) - IBM executive and Minnesota state representative
- Johnny Logan (class of 1945) - MLB player, 4-time All-Star
- Johnny Hart (class of c. 1949) – cartoonist, creator of B.C., co-creator of The Wizard of Id
- Jack Caprio (class of 1949) - writer, B.C. and The Wizard of Id.
- Gary Wilson (class of 1971) - musician
- David Barno (class of 1972) - Military general
- Sarah Patterson (class of 1974) - Alabama Crimson Tide gymnastics head coach 1979-2014
- John Marshall - cartoonist, head artist of Blondie
- Joe Mott (class of 1984) – NFL player
- Isaiah Kacyvenski (class of 1996) – NFL linebacker and investor
- Eric Appel (class of c. 1998) – television director
- Josh Riley (class of 1999) – congressman
- David Archer (class of 2001) – football coach
- Jim Johnson (class of 2001) – MLB pitcher, 2-time saves leader
- Arthur Jones (class of 2004) – NFL player
- Jon Jones (class of 2005) – professional mixed martial artist, former UFC Light Heavyweight and Heavyweight Champion
- Chandler Jones (class of 2008) – NFL player
- Christopher Bill (class of 2010) – musician
- Kylie Strom (class of 2010) – soccer player
- Emily Mackay (class of 2016) – professional runner
- Jon Gernhart (class of 2006) – musician
