= Gerald McCarthy (poet) =

American poet (born 1947)

- Born: 1947 (age 78–79); Endicott, New York, U.S.
- Occupations: Poet, essayist, professor
- Website: www.geraldmccarthypoet.com

Gerald McCarthy (born 1947) is a poet who has written about his experiences as a marine in Vietnam. He has received awards from the National Writers Union and the New York State Council on the Arts. He has twice been a visiting artist at the American Academy in Rome. McCarthy was a professor of English at St. Thomas Aquinas College in Sparkill, New York..

== Wartime experiences ==
As a 17-year-old marine, McCarthy served in Vietnam in 1966–67, unloading cargo from ships at FLSG-Bravo with the 1st Marines, after which he was transferred to the 1st Combat Engineer Battalion in Chu Lai and then Danang. After one tour, McCarthy deserted the military and did time in civilian jail and military prison. His early work, collected in War Story, is a meditation on his experiences in Vietnam. He is a committed anti-war activist and has participated in actions by Vets for Peace and Vietnam Veterans Against the War.

In his 2023 memoir, Hitchhiking Home from Danang—A Memoir of Vietnam, PTSD, and Reclamation, McCarthy chronicles, in a splintered, nonlinear style that mirrors his subject, a life scarred by the nightmare absurdity of his time in Vietnam and his incarceration, after he went AWOL, in civilian jails, Marine brigs, and finally a locked-down Navy psych ward straight out of One Flew Over the Cuckoo's Nest. “Medically discharged, he returned home to upstate New York and piecework in shoe factories,” notes the blurb on his publisher's site. “Written in two voices—one lucid, one dreamlike—Hitchhiking Home from Danang delivers a jump-cut narrative of his troubled adolescence, his wartime experiences, and his struggle to come unstuck from his life.”

“Throughout the book, McCarthy expresses regrets over his 'foolish' decision to go to Vietnam, and he explains why he later became an antiwar and antiracist activist,” writes Harvey Weiner in his review for “Books in Review II,” the online counterpart to the book-review column of The VVA Veteran (published by the Vietnam Veterans of America). “Channeling Tim O’Brien's The Things They Carried, McCarthy spends an entire chapter enumerating every way in which one could die in the Vietnam War. Another chapter describes a fellow prison inmate who, while being transported on a train, went crazy [because] he believed all the people in the car were Viet Cong.” Weiner notes, “[McCarthy] believes he is an example of how PTSD can result from negative experiences throughout one's life, his wartime experiences being only one element of it. 'This is not a war story,' he says, 'although there is war in it and many deaths.'”

== Formative years ==
After his discharge, McCarthy worked as a stonecutter and shoe factory worker. He attended the University of Iowa Writers Workshop, an experience that helped shape his voice as a poet, as did his time teaching writing at Attica Prison and in migrant labor camps, jails, and schools.

McCarthy's work is informed by his Italian-American heritage (McCarthy's mother was Italian, his father Irish American) and his upbringing in the blue-collar factory town of Endicott, New York (which he writes about in his poetry collection, Shoetown).

His poetry, fiction, and criticism have appeared in New Letters, TriQuarterly, America, Beloit Poetry Journal, Ohio Review, RATTLE magazine, Ploughshares, Poet Lore, Nimrod, Carrying the Darkness, From Both Sides Now, A New Geography of Poets, Unaccustomed Mercy: Soldier Poets of The Vietnam War, Asheville Poetry Review, and other magazines and anthologies.

== Critical reception ==
In a Pedestal magazine review of Trouble Light, critic JoSelle Vanderhooft wrote, Review of Trouble Light

Each of these poems presents vivid imagery and detail—the father's hands described as 'not curled or shaking,/ but thick, articulate,' and the father 'half believing his own lie' while reflecting on the possibilities of a lost son's future. McCarthy's poems explore the rural landscape and his family's role within it. His work encompasses various perspectives, including those of a soldier, prisoner, laborer, father, lost son, and disenfranchised steel worker, revealing the human experiences behind his writing. His poetry is characterized by complexity and a contemplative nature.

== Personal life ==
A former professor of English at St. Thomas Aquinas College, McCarthy lives with his wife Michele and their three sons in Nyack, New York. He has lived and traveled widely in Italy, where he was twice appointed a visiting artist at the American Academy in Rome.

== Works ==
- Spring Equinox, 2005 (or, The New War Dead)
- The End of the World, etc.
- On a Line by Li Po
- The Caged Bird and the Minotaur: Silence and Politics in the Poetry of Yusef Komunyakaa and Horace Coleman
- Pylon, The New War Dead
- Attica 1977
- December Rain, Other Voices Poetry
- Flag Burning, Beloit Poetry Journal, Vol. 41, No. 1
- War Story. The Crossing Press, 1977. ISBN 0-912278-87-0
- Shoetown. Cloverdale Library, 1992. ISBN 1-55605-207-3
- Trouble Light. West End Press, 2008. ISBN 0-9816693-0-1
- Door in the Wall (Spuyten-Duyvil Press, 2020) ISBN 978-1-949966-64-0
- Hitchhiking Home from Danang—A Memoir of Vietnam, PTSD and Reclamation (McFarland Publishers, November 2023), ISBN 978-1-4766-9284-5, ebook ISBN 978-1-4766-5044-9 2023
