= Endicott, New York =

- Village
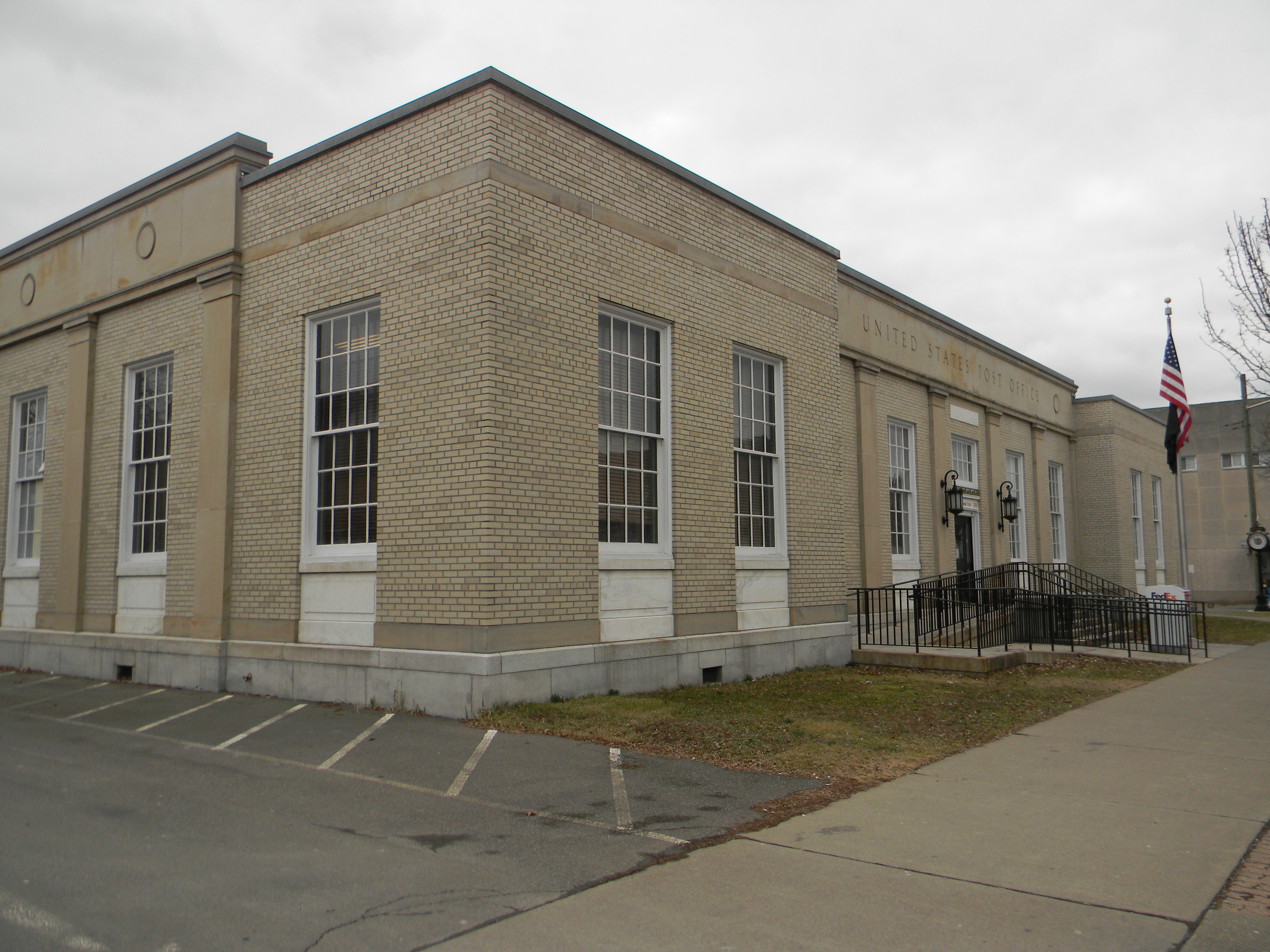
- Endicott Post Office

- Logo
- Nickname: The Magic City
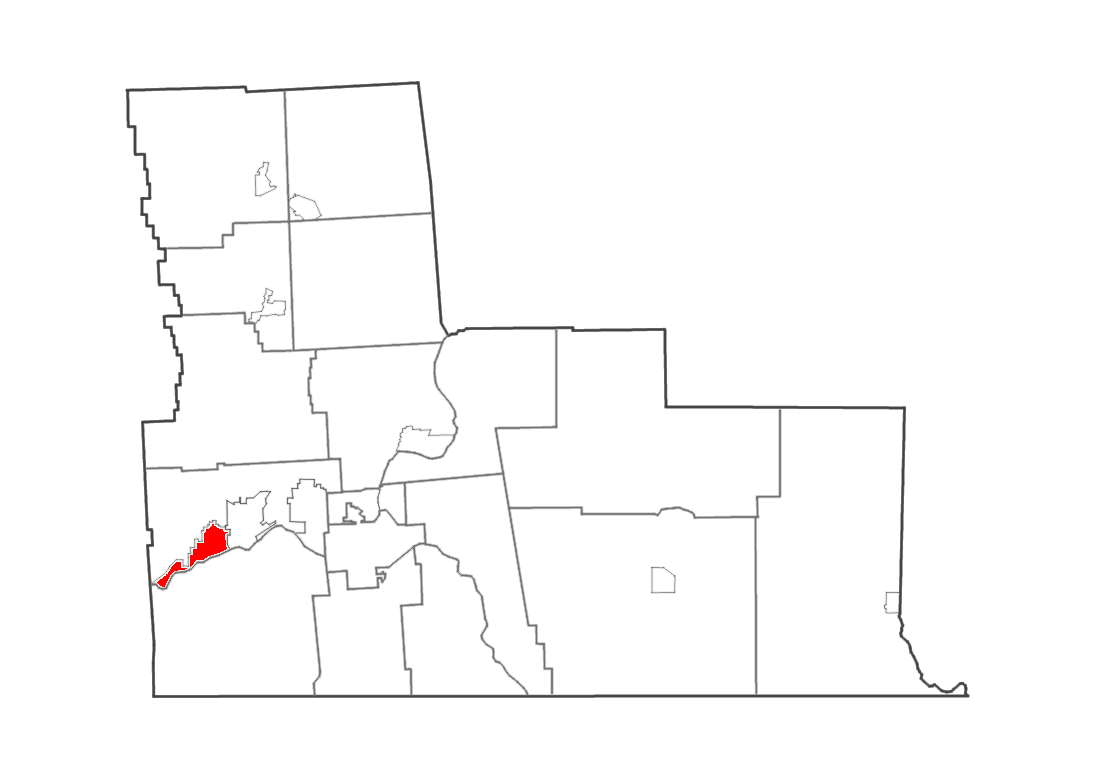
- Map highlighting Endicott's location within Broome County.

- Location within the state of New York
- Coordinates: 42°6′11″N 76°3′17″W
- Country: United States
- State: New York
- County: Broome
- Town: Union
- Incorporated: 1906; 120 years ago

Area
  - Total: 3.20 sq mi (8.28 km^{2})
  - Land: 3.19 sq mi (8.27 km^{2})
  - Water: 0.0039 sq mi (0.01 km^{2})
- Elevation: 840 ft (256 m)

Population (2020)
  - Total: 13,667
  - Density: 4,279.1/sq mi (1,652.18/km^{2})
- Time zone: UTC-5 (Eastern (EST))
  - Summer (DST): UTC-4 (EDT)
- ZIP codes: 13760, 13761, 13763
- Area code: 607
- FIPS code: 36-24515
- GNIS feature ID: 0949657
- Website: www.endicottny.com

Endicott is a village within the town of Union in Broome County, New York, United States. As of the 2020 census, Endicott had a population of 13,667. It is part of the Binghamton metropolitan area. The village is named after Henry B. Endicott, a founding member of the Endicott Johnson Corporation shoe manufacturing company, who founded the community as the "Home of the Square Deal".

The village of Endicott is in the town of Union and is west of the city of Binghamton. The community is served by the Greater Binghamton Airport/Edwin A. Link Field. It is part of the "Triple Cities", along with Binghamton and Johnson City.

== History ==
The village of Endicott was originally made up of two distinct villages: Union village (now the historic business district at the intersection of NYS Route 26 and NYS Route 17C), incorporated in 1892, and Endicott (whose center was along Washington Avenue and North Street), which was incorporated in 1906. Union was a market town along the Susquehanna River settled in the 1790s, serving the farming area between Binghamton and Owego. Endicott, on the other hand, was originally a company town constructed for and by the Endicott Johnson Corporation, which grew to become the largest shoe company in the world by World War I. Growing out of a large tract of farmland, Endicott was known as a boomtown, and as a result acquired the nickname The Magic City. As the two villages had grown so much that there was no longer any physical distinction between them, Union village was merged into Endicott in 1921.

=== The Endicott Johnson Corporation ===
The Endicott Johnson Corporation grew out of the Lester Brothers Boot and Shoe Company which began in Binghamton in 1854. In 1890, Lester Brothers along with Lucas Kacynski Co moved their business west to a nearby rural area, which in 1892, was incorporated as the village of Lestershire and in 1916, became Johnson City. Financial problems in 1890 forced the sale of the company to a creditor and fellow shoemaker, Henry Bradford Endicott of Massachusetts, who founded the Endicott Shoe Company and in 1899, made factory foreman George F. Johnson his partner. The village of Endicott is named after Henry B. Endicott.

George F. Johnson was a brilliant businessman and under his direction the Endicott Shoe Company became very prosperous very quickly. His early adoption of a new machine that could stitch "uppers" to "lowers" was the key to his success, meaning that for the first time in history unskilled labor could manufacture shoes. (Prior to this, shoes were made to individual order by skilled cobblers. People who couldn't afford this bought used shoes, and had cobblers regularly replace the soles and heels as they wore out, until the uppers disintegrated.)

The orders pouring in made expansion of the shoe company necessary. The next parcel of inexpensive, level land along the railroad and safely above the flood plain was a forested area around what is now the intersection of North Street and Washington Avenue in what is now Endicott. What was by then the Endicott-Johnson Corporation purchased this land and several large tracts around it and built a number of state-of-the-art factories along the railroad line. Anticipating population growth, the company also surveyed and laid out the current street pattern of most of Endicott north of Main Street, so in this sense, Endicott was a "planned community". However, because of an initial lack of housing, from 1900 to 1910 most workers commuted on a horse-drawn streetcar line connecting Johnson City to Endicott along the current route of New York State Route 17C.

Endicott grew and flourished due to massive numbers of immigrants who came to the area to work for "EJ", predominantly from southern and eastern Europe. "Which way EJ?" was said to be what they asked immigration officials at Ellis Island in New York City, but it is far more likely that they had already memorized the addresses of relatives or friends living in Endicott. The company also maintained recruiting sites in Italy and the Balkans in the early part of the 20th century. Endicott-Johnson's employment in the region reached a peak of about 20,000 in the early 1920s.

In an innovative and far-sighted policy, George F. Johnson made sections of the company's land holdings outside the factory district available to workers to build homes on, with financing provided by the company, and title reverting to the worker when the loan was paid off. Along with extensive company-provided recreational facilities and medical clinics (unheard of at the time and decades before government took over these responsibilities), this "Square Deal" of the early 20th century is commemorated by stone arches erected by the workers in 1920 across Route 17C (Main Street) at the entrances to Endicott and Johnson City.

Endicott-Johnson was hurt by the Depression of the 1930s, but since shoes were a necessity, did better than other manufacturing sectors of the economy. Orders for shoes from the military in World War II in the 1940s propelled employment over the peak attained in the early 1920s. Unfortunately, the management of Endicott-Johnson after the death of George F. Johnson in 1948, couldn't cope with a more affluent era in the 1950s and 1960s when footwear became mainly a fashion business in the United States. More importantly, little if any money was invested in improving the original 1900 manufacturing technology, which meant that foreign countries could make the same shoes at a lower price. Loss of market share resulted in the closing and sale of the Endicott factories.

=== IBM ===
Endicott is best known as the "Birthplace of IBM". The Computing-Tabulating-Recording Company (CTR) was founded in Endicott on June 16, 1911, via the consolidation of the International Time Recording Company (ITR), The Tabulating Machine Company, Computing Scale Company, and Bundy Time Recording. These companies used a technology invented by Herman Hollerith whereby stiff paper cards with holes in a systematic pattern, called punched cards, could be "read" by machines via electrical contact.

The Computing-Tabulating-Recording Company changed its name to International Business Machines Corporation (IBM) in 1924. The formation of what soon became IBM consolidated some of the major companies in the industrial time-keeping business, but its new chief executive Thomas J. Watson realized that data processing had far greater potential than just workers punching a time clock. A great motivator of salesmen, Watson sent them to a new territory of banks, corporations, and government agencies, where they explained how a database of IBM punched cards and data processing with IBM sorting machines would enable them to answer questions in a day or two that they were never even able to ask because of the months of clerk time that would have been required. By the 1930s IBM was the leading company in the world in electromechanical data processing and had contracts with a number of government agencies, notably the original Social Security contract.

Encouraged by George F. Johnson, who saw Endicott as the world's first industrial "park" with a "Square Deal" for everyone, IBM began building a factory complex just to the east of the Endicott-Johnson factories. The factory complex centered at North Street and McKinley Avenue expanded rapidly in the late 1930s and early 1940s. Endicott was the original location of all IBM manufacturing, research, and development from the early 1920s through World War II.

The outbreak of World War II and the subsequent mobilization of the economy and the induction of 12 million young men into the military resulted in a demand for more data processing work from IBM. Every soldier in World War II had an "IBM Card" in his file. Several of the IBM factories in Endicott were converted to arms production during World War II, notably the production of sidearms (pistols).

After World War II, IBM concentrated on electronic data processing, a significant departure from its previously very prosperous business of electromechanical data processing. IBM's engineers and workers in Endicott provided reliable and cost-effective computers to government agencies, banks, and large corporations in the 1950s. This information revolution transformed the American and world economies, and made IBM one of the world's most successful corporations of the second half of the 20th century.

The expansion of IBM-Endicott beginning in the 1940s resulted in some residential development north and west of the original Endicott street grid, but its major effect was the transformation of the then semi-rural sites of Endwell (to the immediate east) and Vestal (to the immediate south) into the large residential areas they are today. IBM employment in the region peaked at approximately 16,000 in the mid-1980s.

IBM's own expansion in this period was the construction of large research and development centers in the Glendale section of the town of Union (3 miles (5 km) to the west, now occupied by State of New York offices) and in Owego (9 miles (14 km) to the west, now owned by Lockheed Martin). By the mid-1960s, most IBM workers in the region worked at these sites. A circuit board fabricating plant was built on North Street adjacent to the original factory complex in the mid-1960s.

After the Second World War, IBM corporate headquarters moved to Armonk, New York, and new research and manufacturing sites were established throughout the United States and overseas. In 2002, IBM sold the aging Endicott manufacturing site to local investors. IBM leased several buildings in the complex, and employment was estimated at 600–800 in 2012. The jobs were entirely in research and development. By 2023, less than 50 people worked at IBM-Endicott and the company closed the last of their facilities in October, 2023. Much of the IBM factories in Endicott were left abandoned and in ruins and have severely diminished the quality of life in recent years in the area. The village has also lost a significant amount of revenue that manufacturing generated and has greatly contributed towards Broome County becoming one of the poorest counties in New York. The IBM facilities were purchased by BAE Systems inc, who now operate a circuit card and hybrid drive manufacturing operation. The oldest IBM buildings that were built between 1900 and 1914 were finally demolished in 2025 and the site sits vacant. Most of the IBM campus still remains in operation with Phoenix Logistics managing the site.

There are six properties or districts in Endicott that are listed on the National Register of Historic Places. These include two carousels. For more information, see National Register of Historic Places listings in Broome County, New York.

The Triple Cities College, a branch of Syracuse University, was started in Endicott in 1946, using buildings donated by IBM and Endicott-Johnson. The college became Harpur College once it was adopted into the SUNY system, and moved to its present location in Vestal, where it is now known as Binghamton University (BU). BU has seen rapid expansion from 2000 onward and now has a secondary campus in downtown Binghamton. While originally associated with BU, the Cider Mill Playhouse now serves as an independent community theatre in Endicott.

The county-run EnJoie Golf Course in Endicott was home of the PGA Tour's B.C. Open. Originally held annually in September, the tournament attracted golf's biggest names, from Arnold Palmer to Tiger Woods. In 2000, the tournament was moved to June, which left it competing with the British Open for players and coverage. The tournament ended its 30+ year run on the PGA in July 2006. In July 2007, Endicott hosted the first Dick's Sporting Goods Open, a Champions Tour stop.

== Geography ==
The village is on the north side of the Susquehanna River and the Southern Tier Expressway (NYS Route 17).

Endicott is located at 42°6′11″N 76°3′17″W (42.103074, −76.054687).

According to the United States Census Bureau, the village has a total area of 3.2 square miles (8.3 km^{2}), of which 0.004 square miles (0.01 km^{2}), or 0.13%, is water.

== Demographics ==
Historical population
| Census | Pop. | Note | %± |
|---|---|---|---|
| 1910 | 2,408 | | — |
| 1920 | 9,500 | | 294.5% |
| 1930 | 16,231 | | 70.9% |
| 1940 | 17,702 | | 9.1% |
| 1950 | 20,050 | | 13.3% |
| 1960 | 18,775 | | −6.4% |
| 1970 | 16,556 | | −11.8% |
| 1980 | 14,457 | | −12.7% |
| 1990 | 13,531 | | −6.4% |
| 2000 | 13,038 | | −3.6% |
| 2010 | 13,392 | | 2.7% |
| 2020 | 13,667 | | 2.1% |
U.S. Decennial Census

=== 2020 census ===
As of the 2020 census, Endicott had a population of 13,667. The median age was 39.9 years. 20.2% of residents were under the age of 18 and 18.4% of residents were 65 years of age or older. For every 100 females there were 94.5 males, and for every 100 females age 18 and over there were 92.6 males age 18 and over.

100.0% of residents lived in urban areas, while 0.0% lived in rural areas.

There were 6,195 households in Endicott, of which 23.8% had children under the age of 18 living in them. Of all households, 23.9% were married-couple households, 27.8% were households with a male householder and no spouse or partner present, and 36.7% were households with a female householder and no spouse or partner present. About 42.7% of all households were made up of individuals and 14.7% had someone living alone who was 65 years of age or older.

There were 7,171 housing units, of which 13.6% were vacant. The homeowner vacancy rate was 4.3% and the rental vacancy rate was 8.4%.

Racial composition as of the 2020 census
| Race | Number | Percent |
|---|---|---|
| White | 10,432 | 76.3% |
| Black or African American | 1,315 | 9.6% |
| American Indian and Alaska Native | 49 | 0.4% |
| Asian | 266 | 1.9% |
| Native Hawaiian and Other Pacific Islander | 25 | 0.2% |
| Some other race | 378 | 2.8% |
| Two or more races | 1,202 | 8.8% |
| Hispanic or Latino (of any race) | 1,021 | 7.5% |

=== 2010 census ===
As of the 2010 census, there were 13,392 people, 6,058 households, and 2,994 families residing in the village. The population density was 4,198.1 inhabitants per square mile (1,620.9/km^{2}). There were 6,719 housing units at an average density of 2,106.3 per square mile (813.2/km^{2}). The racial makeup of the village was 86.64% White, 6.96% African American, 0.21% Native American, 1.75% Asian, 0.13% Pacific Islander, 0.98% from other races, and 3.32% from two or more races. Hispanic or Latino of any race were 4.44% of the population.

There were 6,058 households, out of which 23.2% had children under the age of 18 living with them, 28.1% were married couples living together, 15.7% had a female householder with no husband present, and 50.6% were non-families. 41.1% of all households were made up of individuals, and 13.1% had someone living alone who was 65 years of age or older. The average household size was 2.14 and the average family size was 2.91.

In the village, the population was spread out, with 21.3% under the age of 18, 9.8% from 18 to 24, 26.9% from 25 to 44, 26.1% from 45 to 64, and 15.9% who were 65 years of age or older. The median age was 38 years. For every 100 females, there were 93.4 males. For every 100 females age 18 and over, there were 91.0 males.

The median income for a household in the village was $32,599, and the median income for a family was $46,761. Males had a median income of $34,572 versus $30,888 for females. The per capita income for the village was $20,603. About 16.2% of families and 21.0% of the population were below the poverty line, including 34.0% of those under age 18 and 13.7% of those age 65 or over.

=== Ethnic history ===
In the early 20th century, Italians flocked to Endicott due to the opportunity for jobs in the Endicott-Johnson shoe factories. The Italians settled on the North Side of the village. Today the North Side of the village is recognized as Little Italy, and still has a large Italian population.

== Pollution ==
For much of its history, IBM dumped tons of industrial solvents, used to clean computer parts, down drains. The solvents also leached from leaky pipes into the ground for years before environmental rules required that such "spills" be reported.

IBM used liquid cleaning agents in circuit board assembly operation for more than two decades, and six spills and leaks were recorded, including one leak in 1979 of 4,100 gallons from an underground tank. These left behind volatile organic compounds in Endicott's soil and aquifer. Trace elements of volatile organic compounds have been identified in Endicott's drinking water, but the levels are within regulatory limits. Also, from 1980, IBM has pumped out 78,000 gallons of chemicals, including trichloroethane, freon, benzene and perchloroethene to the air and allegedly caused several cancer cases among the townspeople. IBM Endicott has been identified by the New York State Department of Environmental Conservation as the major source of pollution, though traces of contaminants from a local dry cleaner and other polluters were also found. Despite the amount of pollutant, state health officials could not verify whether air or water pollution in Endicott has actually caused any health problems. According to city officials, tests show that the water is safe to drink.

In 2002, scientists discovered a large underground chemical plume, which was releasing toxic gases into homes and offices in a 350-acre (1.4 km^{2}) swath south of the plant. The main chemical was the liquid cleaning agent trichloroethylene (TCE), which has been linked to cancer and other illnesses.

Following an initial feasibility assessment, in 2008, the National Institute for Occupational Safety and Health (NIOSH) began a health study of former IBM Endicott employees to determine if they are more likely to develop certain types of cancer than the general public. NIOSH estimated the cost of the study at $3.1 million. The scope of the study was later expanded to include kidney failure among the employees and birth defects among their children. The study found lower total deaths and cancer deaths than would have been expected from the general population.

Since the plume has been discovered, methods including warming the ground area and pulling tainted ground water have decreased the size and intensity of the plume. The Village of Endicott has been working with the New York State DEC to remedy this concern.

== Education ==
Endicott is served by the Union-Endicott Central School District which oversees the following schools:

- Union-Endicott High School (Grades 9–12)
- Linnaeus W. West/ Tiger Ventures School (Grades 8-12)
- Jennie F. Snapp Middle School (Grades 6–8)
- Ann G. McGuinness Elementary (Grades K–5)
- Charles F. Johnson, Jr. Elementary (Grades K–5)
- George F. Johnson Elementary (Grades K–5)
- Thomas J. Watson, Sr. Elementary (Grades K–5)

Prior to the 2011–2012 school year, Linnaeus W. West Elementary was overseen by the Union-Endicott Central School District. Following a flood brought on by Tropical Storm Lee (2011), where it then became Owego Elementary. As a result, Ann G. McGuinness Elementary was turned into a K-5 school, and all Grade 6 students were taken in by Jennie F. Snapp Middle School. As of 2016, Linnaeus W. West Elementary is now a high school overseen by the Union-Endicott Central School District and the XQ Institute.

== Notable people ==
- Eric Appel, TV comedy writer/director
- James Axtell, historian
- Elaine Bonazzi, opera singer
- Dick Biondi, disk jockey
- Russell Bufalino, Mafia boss who lived in Endicott and a suspect in the 1975 disappearance of Teamsters President Jimmy Hoffa
- Anthony George, TV soap opera actor
- Johnny Hart, cartoonist (BC, The Wizard of Id)
- Thomas Hopko, Eastern Orthodox theologian
- Douglas Hurley, NASA astronaut
- Jim Johnson, baseball player
- Arthur Jones, National Football League defensive line
- Chandler Jones, National Football League defensive end
- Jon Jones, professional Mixed Martial Arts fighter
- Isaiah Kacyvenski, National Football League linebacker
- Johnny Logan, Major League Baseball player, four-time All-Star
- Ron Luciano, baseball umpire
- Emily Mackay, Olympic long-distance runner
- Gerald McCarthy, poet and former college professor of English at St. Thomas Aquinas College.
- Randy McStine, musician
- Joe Mott, National Football League linebacker
- Kylie Nadaner, soccer player
- Camille Paglia, author, academic and social critic
- Josh Riley, U.S. representative for New York
- Keith Rothfus, U.S. representative for Pennsylvania
- Amy Sedaris, comedian
- David Sedaris, author
- DeAnne Smith, comedian
- Gary Wilson, musician and performance artist
- Ed Zandy, trumpet player with the Glenn Miller Orchestra
- Ken Zubay, IBM executive and Minnesota state representative
