= Square Deal (disambiguation) =

The Square Deal was U.S. President Theodore Roosevelt's domestic program.

Square Deal may also refer to:

- Square Deal: The Game of Two Dimensional Poker or Cadillac II, a Game Boy video game
- Square Deal Social & Pleasure Club, a jazz ensemble including Lionel Batiste
- A Square Deal, a radio show featuring Hubert Gregg
- Square Deal, an artwork by Lorna Simpson
- Square Deal (TV series), a 1988–1989 British sitcom
- A Square Deal, a 1917 American silent film directed by Harley Knoles
- Square Deal, a publication company started by Reshard Gool, partner of Hilda Woolnough
- Square Deal, a 1982 album by Mick Jackson
- Square Deal, a 2003 album by The Wailing Souls
- The Square Deal, a series of Car Warriors novels by David Drake

== See also ==
- Square (slang)
- Johnson City, New York, known as the Square deal town
  - Johnson City Square Deal Arch
- Endicott-Johnson Co. & The Square Deal, the employment practices of George F. Johnson
  - Endicott Square Deal Arch
- J. Eshelman and Company Store, also known as The Square Deal Store
- "Quack's Square Deal", an episode of Peep and the Big Wide World
- Peter Madden (gang leader)
- Franklin Murphy (governor)
