= Endicott-Johnson Medical Clinic =

Building in Binghamton, New York

- U.S. National Register of Historic Places
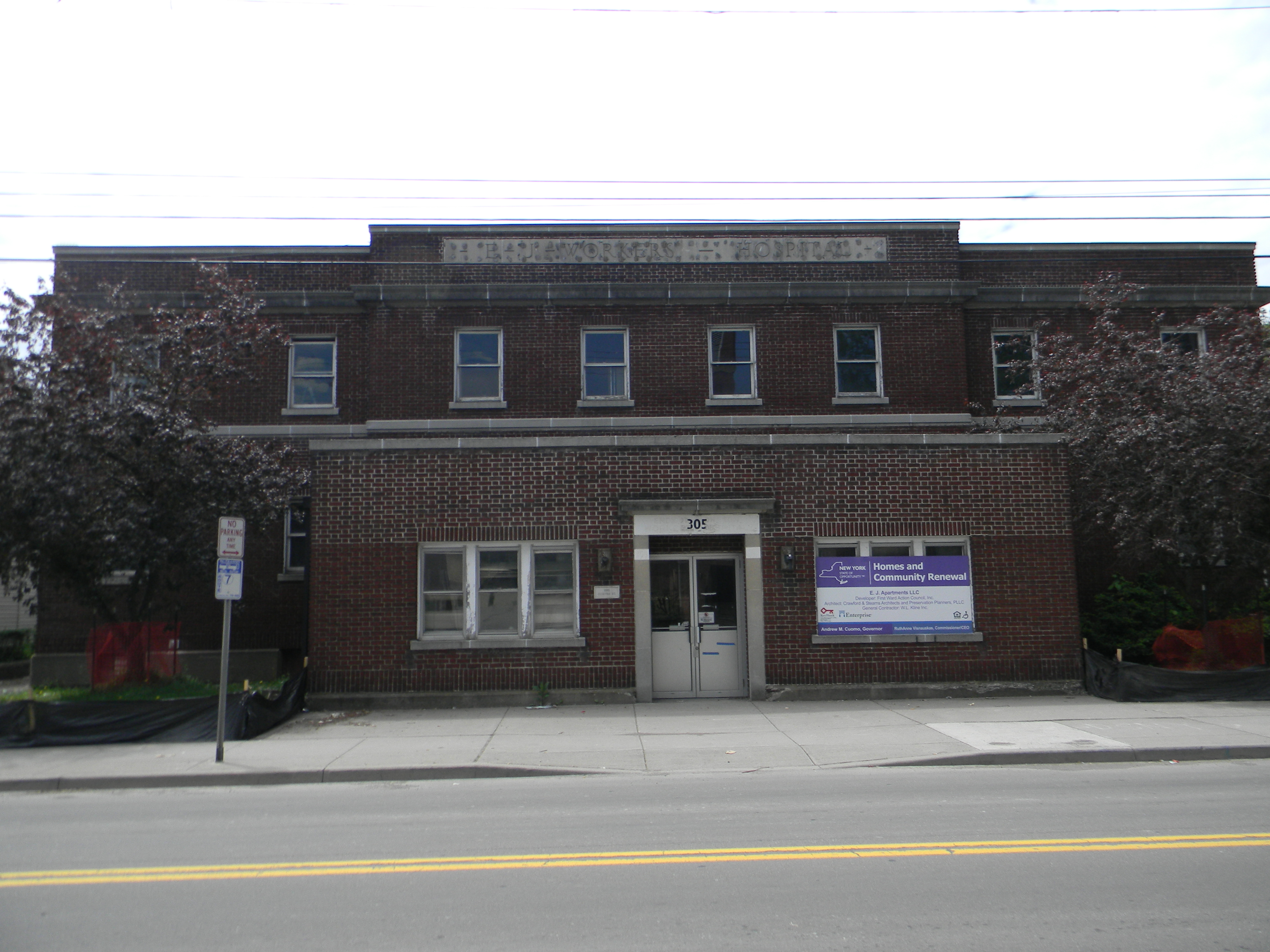
- May 2017

- Location within New York Location within the United States
- Location: 305 Clinton St., Binghamton, New York
- Coordinates: 42°06′34″N 75°56′10″W
- Area: Less than 1 acre (0.40 ha)
- Built: 1928
- NRHP reference No.: 15000672
- Added to NRHP: September 29, 2015

Endicott-Johnson Medical Clinic, also known as the Wilson Hospital Annex, is a historic hospital building located at Binghamton, Broome County, New York. It was built in 1928 by the Endicott Johnson Corporation as a part of its "Square Deal" program. It is a two-story, T-shaped steel frame building with a flat roof, clad in red brick. It has a projecting central section that is four bays wide and a one-story enclosed portico. It was sold in 1946 to the Wilson Memorial Hospital and used as an annex. In 1967, it was purchased by New York State for use as a day care center for the Binghamton Psychiatric Center.

It was listed on the National Register of Historic Places in 2015.

== See also ==
- National Register of Historic Places listings in Broome County, New York
