= Escape Clause =

- The Twilight Zone episode
- Episode no.: Season 1 Episode 6
- Directed by: Mitchell Leisen
- Written by: Rod Serling
- Production code: 173-3603
- Original air date: November 6, 1959

Guest appearances
- David Wayne as Walter Bedeker; Thomas Gomez as Mr. Cadwallader; Virginia Christine as Ethel Bedeker; Dick Wilson as insurance man #1 (Jack); Joe Flynn as insurance man #2 (Steve); Wendell Holmes as Bedeker's lawyer; Raymond Bailey as Bedeker's doctor

Episode chronology
← Previous "Walking Distance"	Next → "The Lonely"
- The Twilight Zone season 1

"Escape Clause" is episode six of the American television anthology series The Twilight Zone. It is "the story of a strange contract between a mortal man and his most satanic majesty"; it originally aired on November 6, 1959, on CBS.

== Opening narration ==
You're about to meet a hypochondriac. Witness Mr. Walter Bedeker, age forty-four. Afraid of the following: death, disease, other people, germs, draft, and everything else. He has one interest in life and that's Walter Bedeker. One preoccupation: the life and well-being of Walter Bedeker. One abiding concern about society: that if Walter Bedeker should die, how will it survive without him?

== Plot ==
Walter Bedeker, a paranoid and self-absorbed hypochondriac, is convinced his wife Ethel and his doctor (who insists Bedeker is in good health) are conspiring to kill him by purposely making him sick. After they leave, a man calling himself Cadwallader appears in Bedeker's room, offering him immortality, indestructibility, and a near-total halt to Bedeker's physical aging. Bedeker guesses Cadwallader's true identity (the Devil) but is unafraid. He haggles with Cadwallader, who admits he wants Bedeker's soul and accurately points out Bedeker will never miss it or notice when it is gone.

Cadwallader inserts an escape clause allowing Bedeker to summon him at any time if Bedeker chooses to die. Bedeker is suspicious, but after Cadwallader leaves, Bedeker tests his new power by placing his hands on a hot radiator and finding them uninjured, then throws all his medicines out of a window, to Ethel's surprise.

Bedeker uses his newfound invulnerability to commit insurance fraud, claiming false settlements, and garnering cheap thrills by hurling himself into life-threatening accidents. After doing so 14 times, he concludes that the absence of risk and fear has made his life a dreadful bore. He purposely mixes a concoction of poisonous household liquids and drinks it, shocking Ethel, but it has no effect on him at all. Bedeker explains his situation to Ethel, admonishing her that if she had any imagination, she would find some way for him to experience some excitement. Proclaiming he is going to jump down the lightwell of their apartment building, Ethel futilely tries to stop him, falling to her own demise.

Bedeker calmly calls the police, confessing to murdering Ethel. He is arrested and brought to trial. He hopes to experience the electric chair. However, due to his lawyer's defense strategy, he is instead sentenced to life in prison without parole. Cadwallader appears in Bedeker's jail cell to remind him of the escape clause. Realizing he will face eternity in prison if he does not use it, Bedeker nods and immediately suffers a fatal heart attack. The guard discovers his lifeless body and sighs, "Poor devil … ."

== Closing narration ==
There's a saying, "Every man is put on Earth condemned to die, time and method of execution unknown." Perhaps this is as it should be. Case in point: Walter Bedeker, lately deceased. A little man with such a yen to live. Beaten by the devil, by his own boredom, and by the scheme of things in this, the Twilight Zone.

== Preview for next week's story ==
One of next week's stars is alongside me now. She'll appear in a most unusual tale called "The Lonely". It's a story that takes place on a - (female voice) an asteroid, and it's a most intriguing premise. (Serling) Sounds it. Next week on The Twilight Zone, Jack Warden, John Dehner, and Jean Marsh appear in a bizarre tale of a man and a - a woman? I don't understand it either. Thank you and good night.

== Production ==
"Escape Clause" was one of the three episodes-in-production mentioned by Rod Serling in his 1959 promotional film pitching the series to potential sponsors, the others being "The Lonely" and "Mr. Denton on Doomsday" (referred to as "Death, Destry, and Mr. Dingle").

== Impact ==
"Here was a little gem. Good work, Rod Serling. This little piece about a hypochondriac who gets tangled up with an obese, clerical devil ranked with the best that has ever been accomplished in half-hour filmed television." —Excerpt from the Daily Variety review.

Disney's Twilight Zone Tower of Terror has a reference to this episode located in the basement of the attraction. The elevators have a certificate of inspection plaque, signed by "Cadwallader", bearing the inspection number "10259". These numbers represent October 2, 1959, the date The Twilight Zone first aired.
