= C. Fred Johnson Park Carousel =

- U.S. National Register of Historic Places
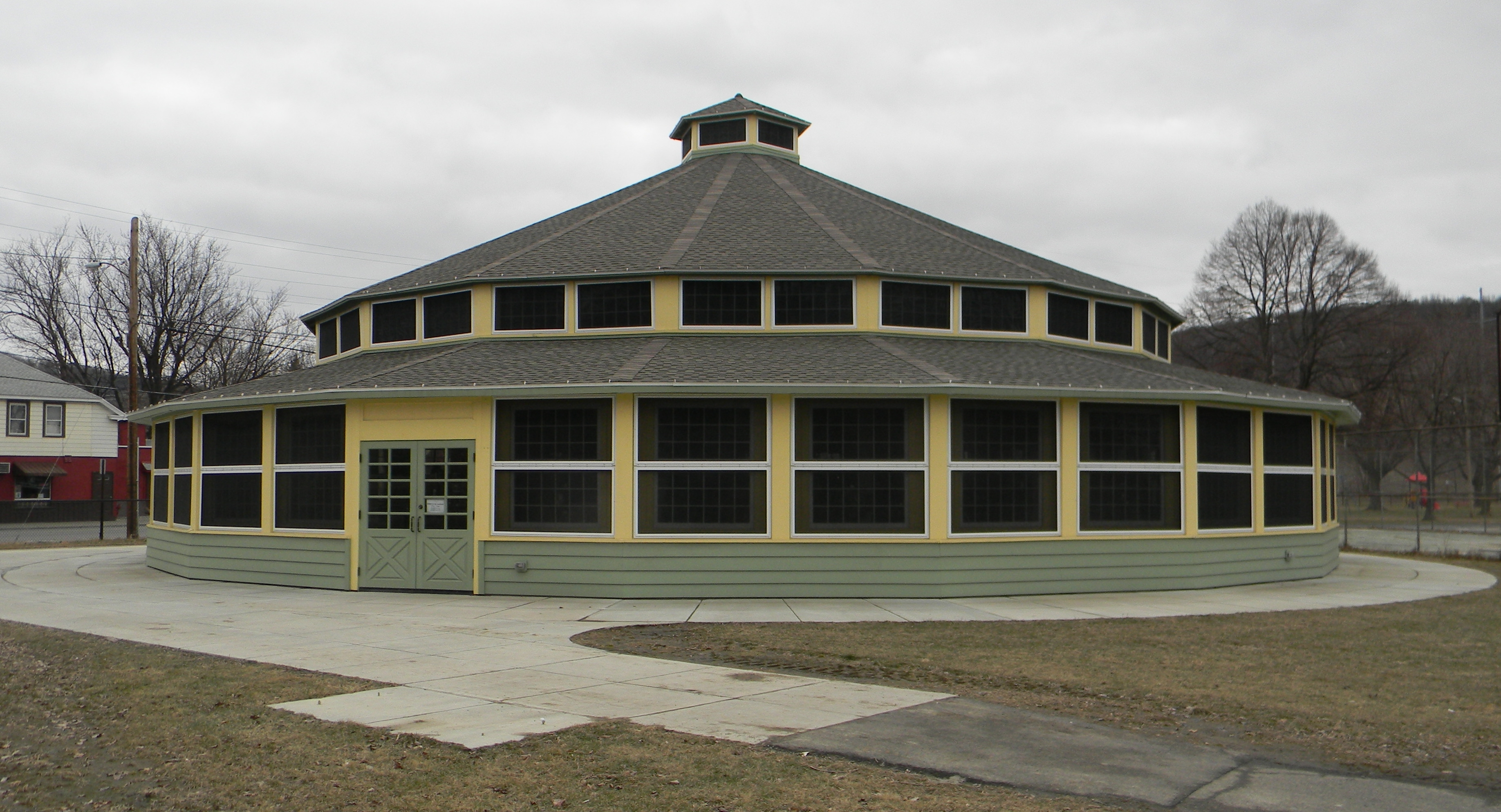
- C. Fred Johnson Park Carousel, Johnson City, NY, February 2012

- Location within New York Location within the United States
- Location: C. Fred Johnson Park, Johnson City, New York
- Coordinates: 42°7′2″N 75°57′1″W
- Area: less than one acre
- Built: 1923
- Architect: Herschell, Allan, Co.
- MPS: Broome County Carousels MPS
- NRHP reference No.: 91001968
- Added to NRHP: January 25, 1992

C. Fred Johnson Park Carousel is a historic carousel located at Johnson City in Broome County, New York. The carousel and its pavilion were built in 1923. The carousel is housed in a wooden, two story, 18-sided, enclosed pavilion topped by a six sided cupola. The carousel has 72 figures - all horses - each of which is a "jumper." It was constructed by the Allan Herschell Company. It is one of six carousels donated to the citizens of Broome County by George F. Johnson (1857–1948), president of Endicott Johnson Corporation.

It was listed on the National Register of Historic Places in 1992.

Other carousels located in the Greater Binghamton Region:

- George F. Johnson Recreation Park Carousel
- George W. Johnson Park Carousel
- Highland Park Carousel
- Ross Park Carousel
- West Endicott Park Carousel

== See also ==
- Amusement rides on the National Register of Historic Places
