= Highland Park Carousel =

- U.S. National Register of Historic Places
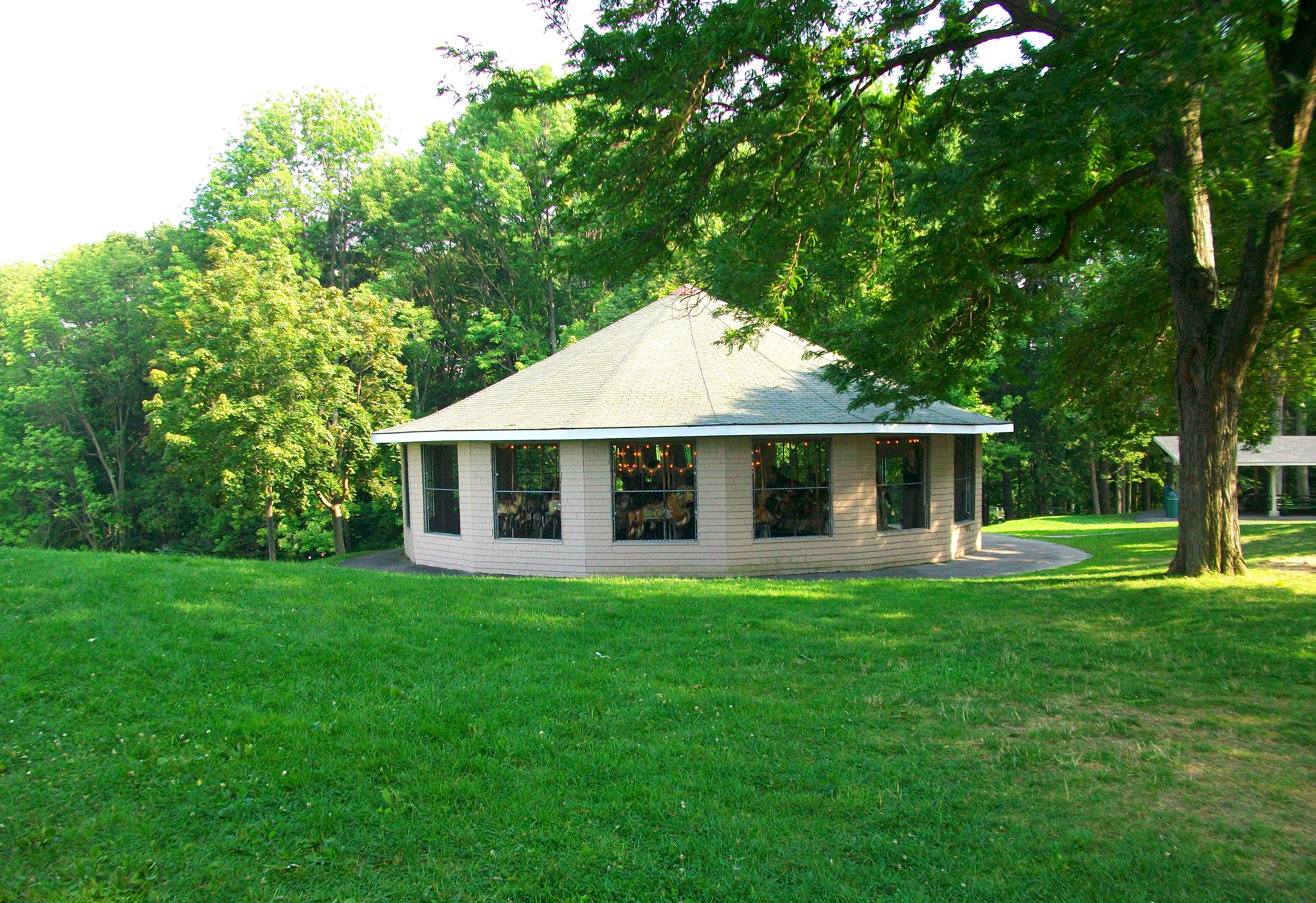
- Highland Park Carousel, August 2009

- Location within New York Location within the United States
- Nearest city: Endicott, New York
- Coordinates: 42°7′31″N 76°1′44″W
- Area: less than one acre
- Built: 1920
- Architect: Herschell, Allan, Co.
- MPS: Broome County Carousels MPS
- NRHP reference No.: 91001963
- Added to NRHP: January 25, 1992

Highland Park Carousel, also known as En-Joie Park Carousel and Ideal Park Carousel, is a historic carousel located at Endwell in Broome County, New York. The carousel was purchased between 1920 and 1925 and moved to its present site in 1967. It was previously located in Ideal Park (later En-Joie Park). The carousel is housed in a wooden, one story, 16-sided, enclosed pavilion. The carousel has 36 figures: 34 horses, one pig and one dog, each of which is a "jumper," and two chariots. It was constructed by the Allan Herschell Company. It is one of six carousels donated to the citizens of Broome County by George F. Johnson (1857–1948), president of Endicott Johnson Corporation.

It was listed on the National Register of Historic Places in 1992.

== See also ==
- Amusement rides on the National Register of Historic Places

Other carousels located in the Greater Binghamton Region:

- C. Fred Johnson Park Carousel
- George F. Johnson Recreation Park Carousel
- George W. Johnson Park Carousel
- Ross Park Carousel
- West Endicott Park Carousel
