= West Endicott Hose Company No. 1 =

Historic place in New York, United States

- U.S. National Register of Historic Places
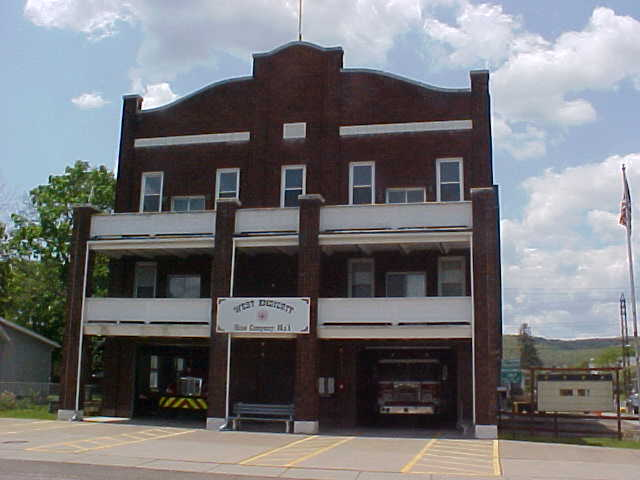

- Location within New York Location within the United States
- Location: 113 N. Page Ave., West Endicott, New York
- Coordinates: 42°05′56″N 76°04′25″W
- Area: 0.19 acres (0.077 ha)
- Built: c. 1926-1927
- Built by: Booth and Detrick
- NRHP reference No.: 13000625
- Added to NRHP: August 27, 2013

West Endicott Hose Company No. 1 is a historic fire station located at West Endicott, Broome County, New York. It was built in 1926–27 by the Endicott Johnson Corporation as a part of its "Square Deal" program. It is a three-story, rectangular steel frame building, clad in red brick and cast stone. It is five bays wide by 12 bays deep. The front facade features second and third story porches supported by brick piers. The building also houses recreational facilities used by the local community.

It was listed on the National Register of Historic Places in 2015.

== See also ==
- National Register of Historic Places listings in Broome County, New York
