= West Endicott Park Carousel =

- U.S. National Register of Historic Places
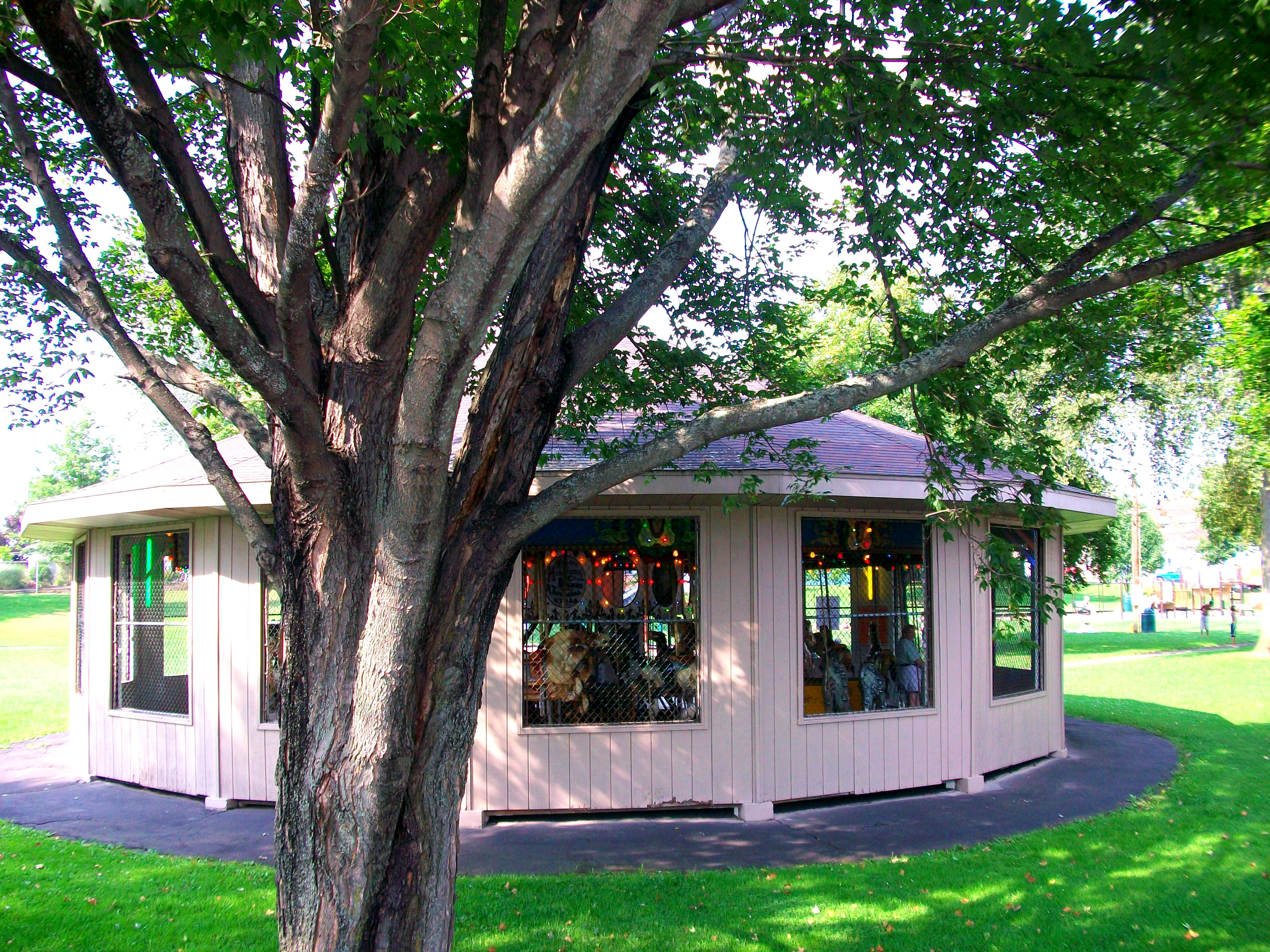
- Carousel in West Endicott Park, August 2009

- Location within New York Location within the United States
- Nearest city: Endicott, New York
- Coordinates: 42°5′53″N 76°4′24″W
- Area: less than one acre
- Built: 1929
- Architect: Herschell, Allan, Co.
- MPS: Broome County Carousels MPS
- NRHP reference No.: 91001965
- Added to NRHP: January 25, 1992

West Endicott Park Carousel is a historic carousel located at Endicott in Broome County, New York. The carousel was purchased about 1929. The carousel is housed in a wooden, one story, 16-sided, enclosed pavilion. The carousel has 36 figures: 34 horses, one pig and one dog, each of which is a "jumper," and two chariots. It was constructed by the Allan Herschell Company. It is one of six carousels donated to the citizens of Broome County by George F. Johnson (1857–1948), president of Endicott Johnson Corporation.

It was listed on the National Register of Historic Places in 1992.

Other carousels located in the Greater Binghamton Region:

- C. Fred Johnson Park Carousel
- George F. Johnson Recreation Park Carousel
- George W. Johnson Park Carousel
- Highland Park Carousel
- Ross Park Carousel

== See also ==
- Amusement rides on the National Register of Historic Places
