= Recreation Park (Binghamton) =

Public park in Binghamton, New York

Coordinates: 42°06′0″N 75°56′0″W

- Interactive map of Recreation Park
- Type: Urban park
- Location: Binghamton, New York
- Area: 18 acres (7.3 ha)
- Created: 1925
- Operator: City of Binghamton
- Status: Open all year

Recreation Park is a public, urban park in Binghamton, New York. Located in Binghamton's West Side, Recreation Park is bordered by Schubert Street to the North, and Laurel Avenue to the East, Seminary Avenue to the South, and Beethoven Street to the West. Shoe manufacturer George F. Johnson donated it to Binghamton, and it is home to one of Allan Herschell's six famous carousels. The park also contains a bandstand, statues and monuments, numerous athletic fields and courts, swimming facilities, a playground, and walking paths in a grove of mature oak trees.

== History ==
The area where the park now stands was originally farmland owned by Abel Bennett, the former first mayor of Binghamton. George F. Johnson, the founder of Endicott-Johnson Shoe Corp., purchased this land, along with three smaller parcels of land owned by other landowners. In October 1921 he donated all of it to the City of Binghamton on condition "that it shall remain forever a public park, and that it shall be properly improved and maintained by the city as such. If at any time this property shall be used for any other purpose, it shall revert to the giver, his heirs or assigns."

The George F. Johnson Recreation Park Carousel, which was manufactured by the Allan Herschell Company, was added in 1925, with a Wurlitzer #146-B Band Organ providing the carousel's music. The carousel was listed on the National Register of Historic Places in 1992. The bathhouse, whose roof once comprised red tiles, continues to serve patrons. The bandstand hosts concerts in the summertime. A giant wooden toboggan slide was situated at the Laurel Avenue side of the park in its early days but it was lost in a fire.

The park had fallen into serious disrepair by the 1980s. In response, a task force set about examining the park and its amenities and making recommendations regarding repairs and restoration, which were published in the 1986 Heritage Committee Special Report. In the report the members noted that the park "has primarily changed only in the form of falling into such a state of disrepair that renovation is no longer cost efficient." As a result, the park underwent restoration, including restoration of the bandstand. In 2004 the Binghamton University art department, utilizing a grant from the Rose-Ross University and Community Projects Fund, restored the reflecting pool and its sculpture Boy with Fish, which was created by artist Charles Keck in 1922.

There is a Rod Serling memorial plaque in the bandstand, which refers to the Twilight Zone episode "Walking Distance": Serling grew up in Binghamton and the carousel featured in the episode is said to have been inspired by the one in Recreation Park. The plaque and episode are also referenced heavily in the 2015 film The Rewrite, which is mostly set in Binghamton.
