= Ross Park Carousel =

- U.S. National Register of Historic Places
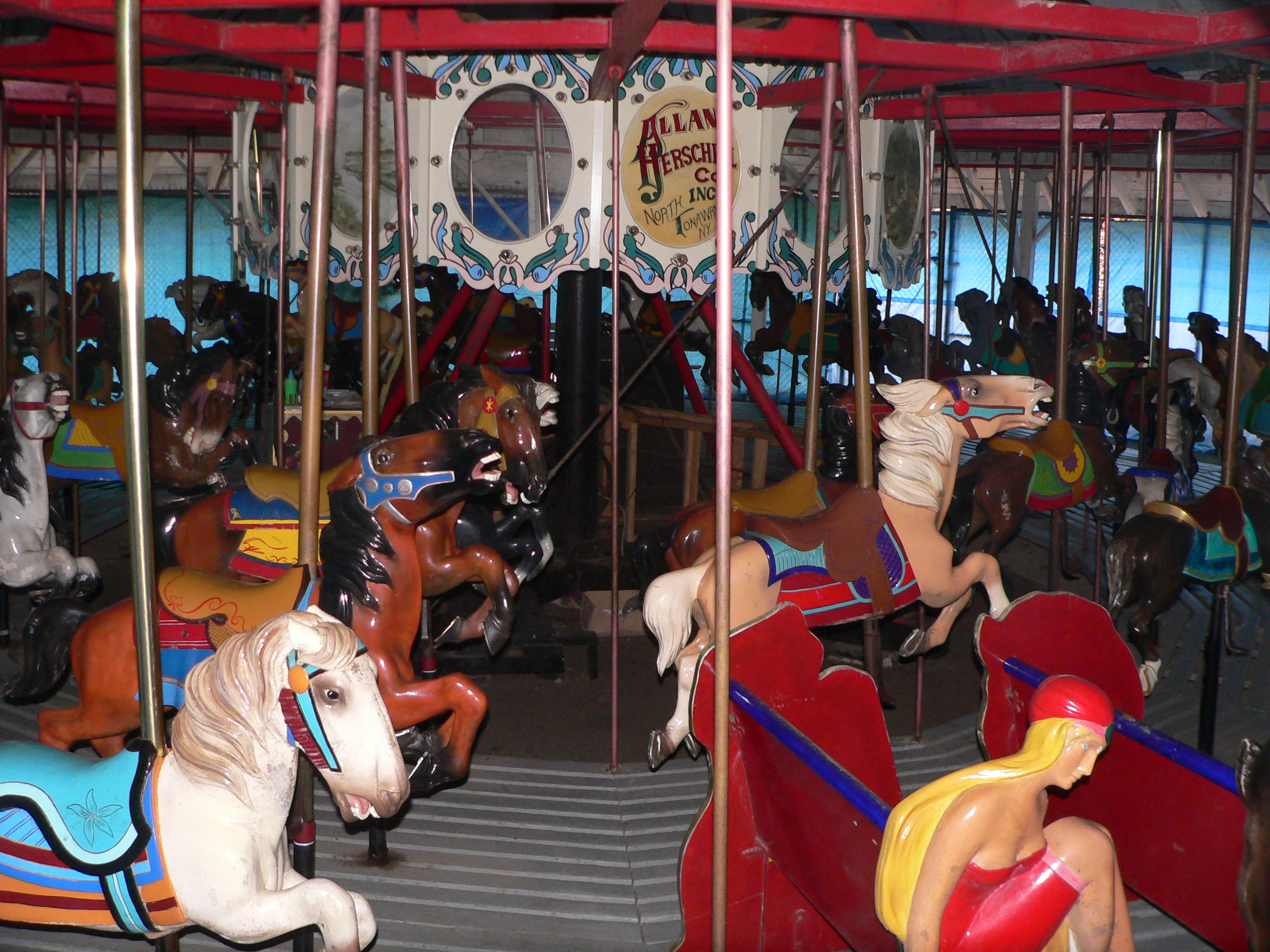

- Location within New York Location within the United States
- Location: Ross Park, Binghamton, New York
- Coordinates: 42°4′31″N 75°54′28″W
- Area: less than one acre
- Built: 1920
- Architect: Herschell, Allan, Co.
- MPS: Broome County Carousels MPS
- NRHP reference No.: 91001966
- Added to NRHP: January 25, 1992

Ross Park Carousel is a historic carousel located at Binghamton in Broome County, New York. The carousel is housed in a wooden, one story, 16-sided, pavilion topped by an eight sided cupola. The carousel has 60 horses standing four abreast, each of which is a "jumper," and two chariots. It was constructed by the Allan Herschell Company and contains its original Wurlitzer #146-A Band Organ. The carousel was purchased about 1920 and is one of six carousels donated to the citizens of Broome County by George F. Johnson (1857–1948), president of Endicott Johnson Corporation.

It was listed on the National Register of Historic Places in 1992.

Other carousels located in the Greater Binghamton Region:

- C. Fred Johnson Park Carousel
- George F. Johnson Recreation Park Carousel
- George W. Johnson Park Carousel
- Highland Park Carousel
- West Endicott Park Carousel

== See also ==
- Amusement rides on the National Register of Historic Places
