= George W. Johnson Park Carousel =

- U.S. National Register of Historic Places
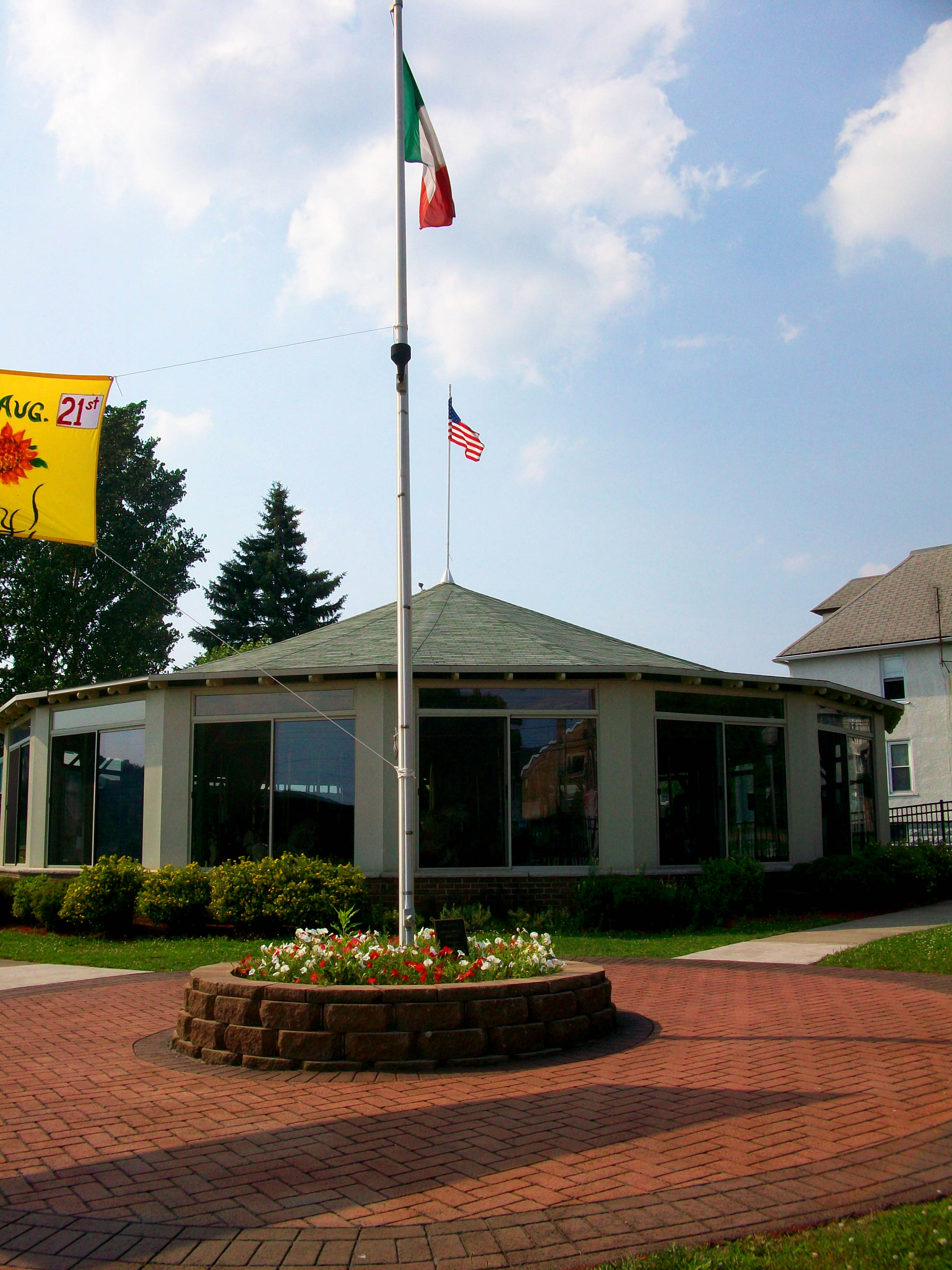
- Carousel in George W. Johnson Park, August 2009

- Location within New York Location within the United States
- Location: George W. Johnson Park, Endicott, New York
- Coordinates: 42°6′40″N 76°3′3″W
- Area: less than one acre
- Built: 1934
- MPS: Broome County Carousels MPS
- NRHP reference No.: 91001964
- Added to NRHP: January 25, 1992

George W. Johnson Park Carousel is a historic carousel located at Endicott in Broome County, New York. The carousel and its pavilion were built in 1934. The carousel is housed in a wooden, one story, 16-sided, pavilion. The carousel has 36 horses standing three abreast, each of which is a "jumper," and two chariots. It was constructed by the Allan Herschell Company. It is one of six carousels donated to the citizens of Broome County by George F. Johnson (1857–1948), president of Endicott Johnson Corporation.

It was listed on the National Register of Historic Places in 1992.

Other carousels located in the Greater Binghamton Region:

- C. Fred Johnson Park Carousel
- George F. Johnson Recreation Park Carousel
- Highland Park Carousel
- Ross Park Carousel
- West Endicott Park Carousel

== See also ==
- Amusement rides on the National Register of Historic Places
