= Johnson City Square Deal Arch =

Historic place in New York, United States

- U.S. National Register of Historic Places
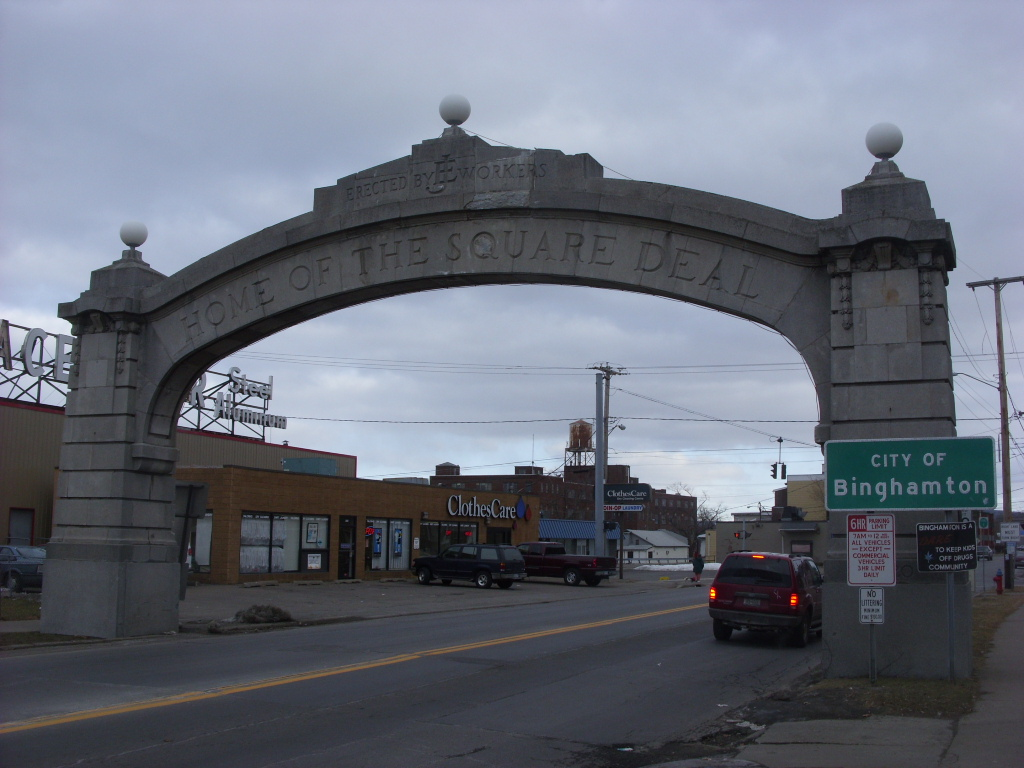
- Johnson City Square Deal Arch, February 2009

- Location within New York Location within the United States
- Location: Main St., W of Floral Ave., Johnson City, New York
- Coordinates: 42°5′41″N 76°3′27″W
- Area: less than one acre
- Built: 1920
- Built by: Bert Booth
- Architect: T. I. Lacey & Son
- Architectural style: Classical Revival
- Restored: 1982
- Restored by: Hobart Stone Dealers Inc.
- NRHP reference No.: 01000044
- Added to NRHP: February 16, 2001

Johnson City Square Deal Arch is a historic "welcome arch" located at Johnson City in Broome County, New York. It is one of two identical arches erected in 1920 in Johnson City and in nearby Endicott, known as the Endicott Square Deal Arch. It was originally constructed by Endicott-Johnson Shoe Company employees to honor George F. Johnson (1857–1948), their highly respected employer and benefactor.

After being dismantled in 1976 due to deterioration, it was rebuilt in 1982 in the same location.

It was listed on the National Register of Historic Places in 2001.

It was removed in June 2024.
