= George F. Johnson Recreation Park Carousel =

- U.S. National Register of Historic Places
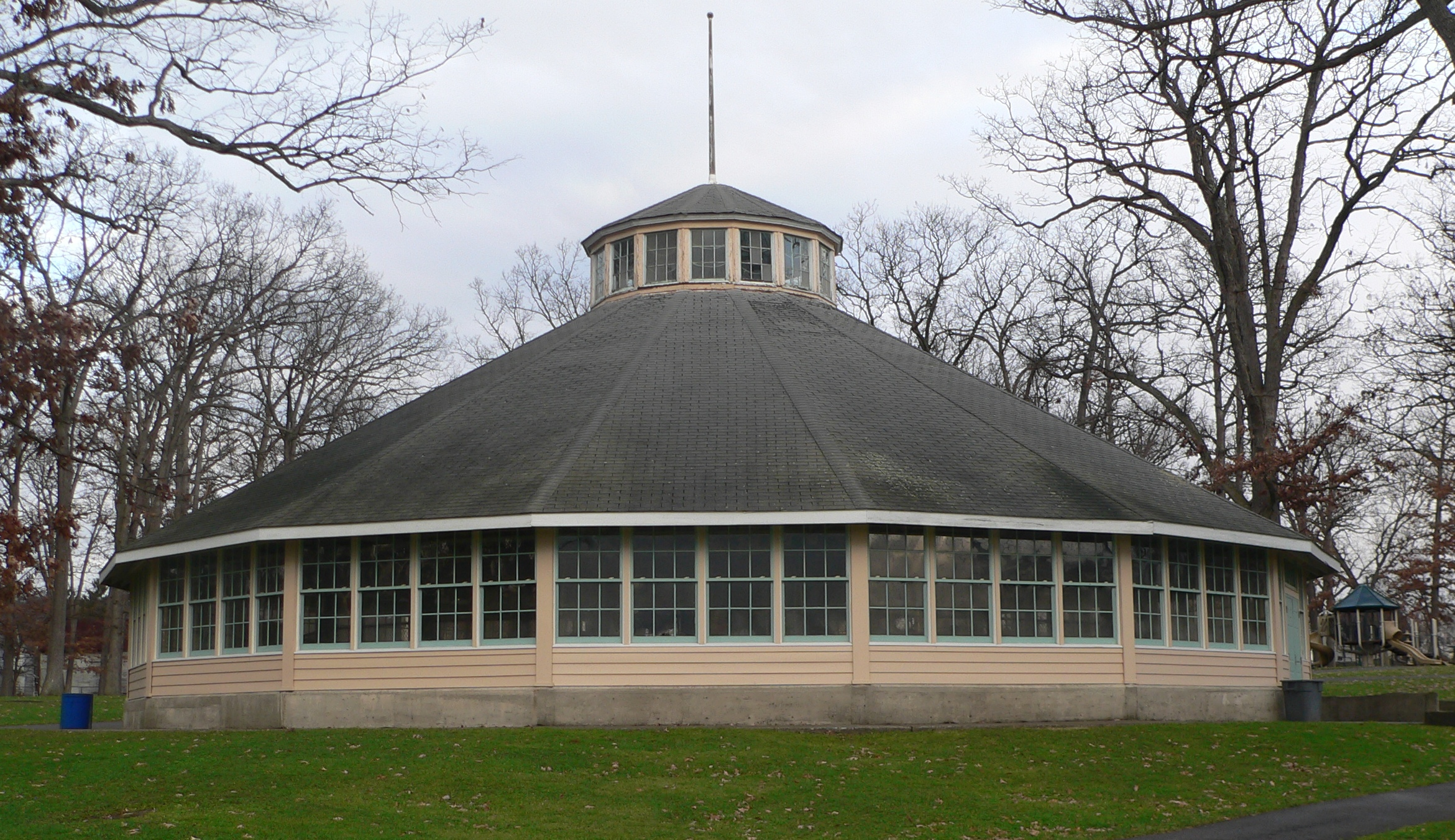
- Pavilion housing carousel

- Location within New York Location within the United States
- Location: George F. Johnson Recreation Park, Binghamton, New York
- Coordinates: 42°5′57″N 75°56′2″W
- Area: less than one acre
- Built: 1925
- Architect: Herschell, Allan, Co.
- MPS: Broome County Carousels MPS
- NRHP reference No.: 91001967
- Added to NRHP: January 25, 1992

The George F. Johnson Recreation Park Carousel is a historic carousel located at Binghamton in Broome County, New York. The carousel and its pavilion were built in 1925. The carousel is housed in a wooden, one story, 16-sided, pavilion topped by a cupola. The carousel has 60 horses standing four abreast, each of which is a "jumper," and two chariots. It was constructed by the Allan Herschell Company and contains its original Wurlitzer Military Band Organ. The carousel was listed on the National Register of Historic Places in 1992.

This carousel, the gazebo, and the entire Recreation Park served as inspiration for Binghamton native Rod Serling's classic The Twilight Zone episode "Walking Distance", as noted in a bronze plaque honoring Serling in the floor of the gazebo. There are also paintings depicting memorable scenes from The Twilight Zone on the carousel.

This is one of six carousels donated to the citizens of Broome County by George F. Johnson (1857–1948), president of Endicott Johnson Corporation. The others, located in the Greater Binghamton Region, are:

- C. Fred Johnson Park Carousel
- George W. Johnson Park Carousel
- Highland Park Carousel
- Ross Park Carousel
- West Endicott Park Carousel

== See also ==
- Amusement rides on the National Register of Historic Places
