= The Sixteen-Millimeter Shrine =

- The Twilight Zone episode
- Episode no.: Season 1 Episode 4
- Directed by: Mitchell Leisen
- Written by: Rod Serling
- Cinematography by: George T. Clemens
- Production code: 173-3610
- Original air date: October 23, 1959

Guest appearances
- Ida Lupino as Barbara Jean Trenton; Martin Balsam as Danny Weiss; Jerome Cowan as Jerry Hearndan; John Clarke as Young Jerry Hearndan; Ted de Corsia as Marty Sall; Alice Frost as Sally

Episode chronology
← Previous "Mr. Denton on Doomsday"	Next → "Walking Distance"
- The Twilight Zone (1959 TV series, season 1)

"The Sixteen-Millimeter Shrine", starring Ida Lupino, is episode four of the American television series The Twilight Zone. It originally aired on October 23, 1959, on CBS. The title is a reference to 16 mm film.

== Opening narration ==
Picture of a woman looking at a picture. Movie great of another time, once-brilliant star in a firmament no longer a part of the sky, eclipsed by the movement of earth and time. Barbara Jean Trenton, whose world is a projection room, whose dreams are made out of celluloid. Barbara Jean Trenton, struck down by hit-and-run years and lying on the unhappy pavement, trying desperately to get the license number of fleeting fame.

== Plot ==
Aging film star Barbara Jean Trenton secludes herself in her private screening room, where she reminisces about her past by watching her old films from the 1930s. In an attempt to bring her out into the real world, her agent Danny Weiss arranges a part for her in a new movie. Barbara and the man who runs the studio, Marty Sall, however, have historically had a contentious relationship; he is rather petty, small, and callous. He offers her the role of a mother, which she refuses, to which Marty then insults her, telling her she's living in the past and that any role she would receive would be charity. Barbara leaves in anger. When Barbara returns home, she and Danny get into an argument when she decides to throw a party for her show-business friends. Danny points out that all of those friends have either moved away or have died, and that she keeps wishing for things that are dead.

After the argument, Barbara has, according to her maid, chosen to stay in the screening room day and night. Danny decides to bring a former leading man—now also older, Jerry Hearndan, many years retired from acting and managing a chain of grocery stores—to visit her. She is horrified by her friend's aged appearance and orders them both to leave. After the ill-fated visit, Barbara goes back into the projector room and puts on a movie that features Jerry's younger self. She will not accept that the present-day Jerry is the real one and repeatedly voices her wish to join the one on the screen; the screen blurs accordingly.

Barbara's maid comes with a snack and coffee, only to find the room empty—and is horrified by what she sees on the screen. She calls Danny and, when he comes over, tells him that—to her mind—Barbara has vanished from the house. He runs to the projector and sees, in the movie, the front hall of the house filled with movie stars, looking as they did in the old films. Barbara descends the stairs, welcomes them to the party and says that dinner will be by the pool. As she starts off with Jerry, Danny tries to call her back to 1959 and reality. In response, she blows a kiss, throws her scarf toward the camera, and departs. The film ends.

In the actual front hall, Danny finds Barbara's scarf. "To wishes, Barbie", he says wistfully. "To the ones that come true."

== Closing narration ==
To the wishes that come true, to the strange, mystic strength of the human animal, who can take a wishful dream and give it a dimension of its own. To Barbara Jean Trenton, movie queen of another era, who has changed the blank tomb of an empty projection screen into a private world. It can happen in the Twilight Zone.

== Preview for next week's story ==
Next week, we invite you to take a strange journey back in time with Mr. Gig Young, who tries to make the exodus of all men in their desperate attempt to relive the past. We offer a most bizarre story called "Walking Distance," and we hope you'll be around to share it with us. Thank you and good night.

== Episode notes ==
This episode contains several similarities to Billy Wilder's 1950 film Sunset Boulevard starring Gloria Swanson and shares the same composer and conductor of music, Franz Waxman. Episode director Mitchell Leisen directed Billy Wilder scripts at Paramount in the 1930s. It also evokes 1952's The Star with Bette Davis which was directed by Stuart Heisler and released by Twentieth Century Fox.

Ida Lupino later directed the season five episode "The Masks". She was both the only person to have acted in one episode and directed another, and the only woman to direct a Twilight Zone episode.

Martin Balsam starred in the de facto pilot for Twilight Zone, "The Time Element" (broadcast as part of Westinghouse Desilu Playhouse), and returned to star in the season four episode "The New Exhibit". Between his two episodes of Twilight Zone, Balsam appeared in three iconic films of the era: Psycho, Breakfast at Tiffany's and Cape Fear.
