= Endicott Johnson Corporation =

American shoe manufacturer

Coordinates: 42.1157°N 75.9523°W

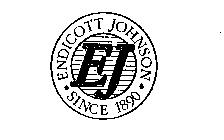
- Predecessor: Lester Brothers Boot and Shoe Company
- Founded: 1899
- Fate: Acquired, 1995
- Successor: Rocky Shoes and Boots
- Headquarters: Endicott, New York, USA
- Area served: Worldwide
- Key people: George F. Johnson and Henry Bradford Endicott
- Products: Shoes, Boots, Rubber, Paracord, Welts, and related care products
- Number of employees: 20,000 (peak, c. 1920)

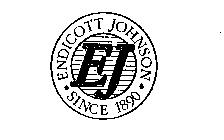

The Endicott-Johnson Shoe Company ("E-J") was a manufacturer of shoes based in New York's Southern Tier, with factories mostly located in the area's Triple Cities of Binghamton, Johnson City, and Endicott. An estimated 20,000 people worked in the company's factories by the 1920s, and an even greater number worked there during the boom years of the mid-1940s when, helped by footwear it produced for the military during the war years, it was producing 52 million pairs of shoes a year. During the early 1950s, the work force was still approximately 17,000 to 18,000. Today, EJ Footwear, LLC operates as a unit of Nelsonville, Ohio-based Rocky Shoes & Boots, Inc.

== Founding ==
Postcard view of one of the Johnson City (then Lestershire) factory complexes. Much of the history of E-J was documented only in such post-card images.

The Endicott Johnson Corporation grew out of the Lester Brothers Boot and Shoe Company, which began in Binghamton in 1854. In 1890, the Lester Brothers moved their business west to a nearby rural area, which in 1892 was incorporated as the Village of Lestershire and in 1916 became Johnson City. Financial problems in 1890 forced the sale of the company to a creditor and fellow shoemaker, Henry Bradford Endicott of Dedham, Massachusetts, who founded the Endicott Shoe Company and in 1899 made factory foreman George F. Johnson his partner.

== George F. and the Square Deal ==
The E-J story is dominated by George F. Johnson (1857–1948), or George F as he was popularly called, who rose through the shoe factory ranks to become the half-owner of E-J, and its highest executive until his death in 1948.

George F's reign was dominated by his Square Deal version of welfare capitalism that, like progressive movements of the early twentieth century, advocated providing parades and churches and libraries to "uplift" workers. George F's Square Deal consisted of worker benefits even in harsh economic times that were generous and innovative for their time, but also meant to engender worker loyalty and discourage unionizing. The company had a chess and checkers club.

For workers, the Square Deal consisted of a chance to buy E-J built and E-J financed homes, a profit sharing program, health care from factory-funded medical facilities and later (built in 1949) two worker recreational facilities. But the Square Deal was more than an employee benefit program. E-J and the Johnson family also provided and helped to finance two libraries, theaters, a golf course, swimming pools, carousels, parks and food markets, many of which were available to the community without charge. Reminders of the source of that generosity were inescapable:

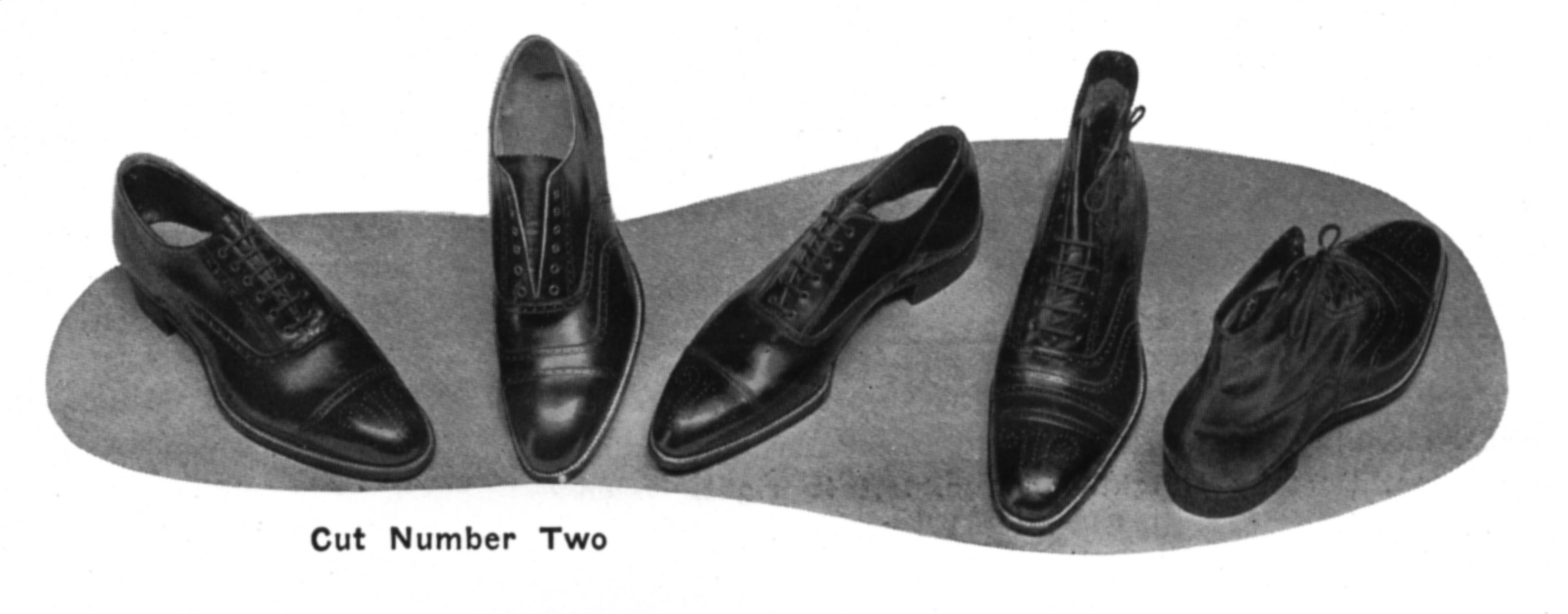
Example of EJ's dress shoes from the 1920s

Endicott was a community planned by E-J and incorporated in 1906. It was named after Henry B. Endicott (one of the grade schools was named Henry B,) who owned the business that became E-J. Lestershire was renamed Johnson City, New York in honor of George F. All of the tanneries and the vast majority of the shoe factories were located in Endicott with a few satellite locations in Johnson City and Binghamton. The Johnsons lived in Endicott and George F's mansion was donated to the Village after his death and became the public library. Most of the jobs were classified as "piece work." Racks of shoes moved through the factories with "coupons" attached to each rack. When the worker completed his/her operation on the rack of shoes, he or she removed the appropriate coupon which was worth a few pennies. At the end of the week the worker turned in his coupons from which the payroll department calculated pay. The work was hard and the pay was low, but the extensive benefits were offsets. The windows in the factories were painted so workers wouldn't be distracted by the outside. The company needed a large labor pool and initiated a recruitment program aimed at southern Italy and the Slavic countries and so Endicott became a small town with a rich ethnic mix. Many of the sons and daughters of these immigrants graduated from Union-Endicott High School and went on to become teachers, doctors, lawyers, engineers, and successful business people. Very few went to work in the factories.

=== The E-J Workers Arch and other monuments ===
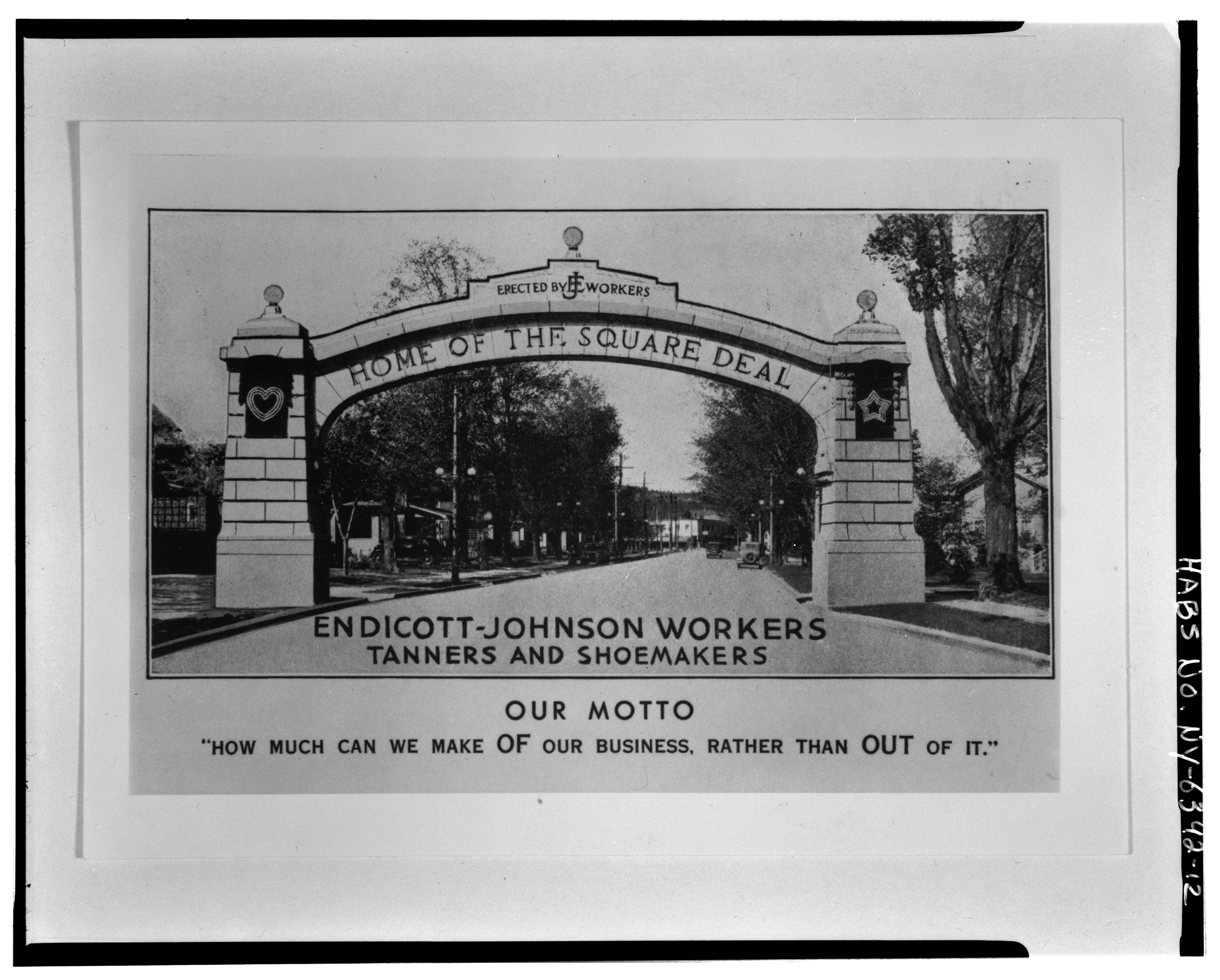
E-J Workers Arch

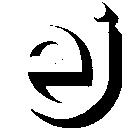

The entrance to Johnson City on Main Street from Binghamton is marked with a stone arch embossed with Home of the Square Deal. There is a corresponding arch on the other end of Main Street that served as the entrance to Endicott.

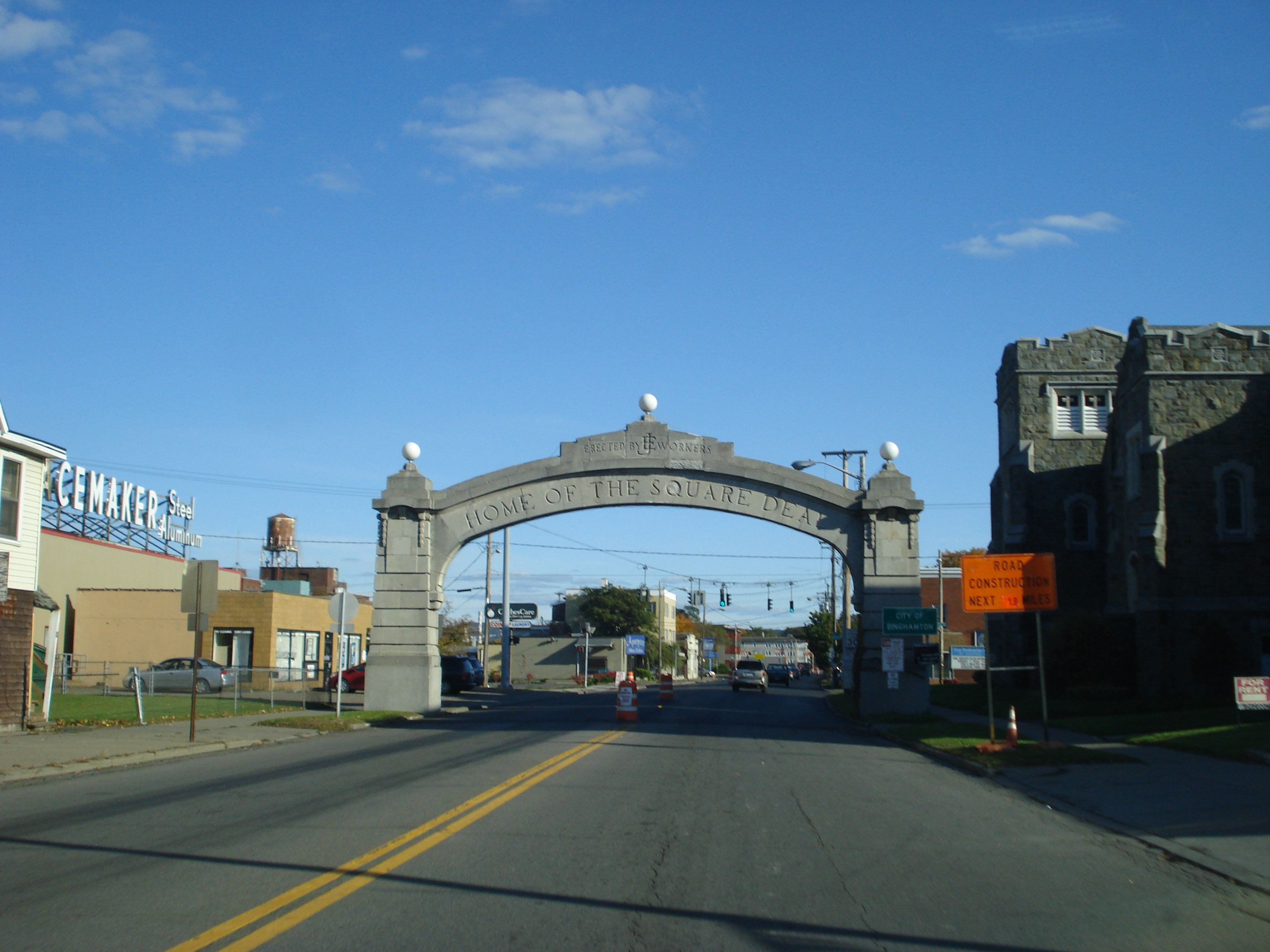
Square Deal Arch on the border between Binghamton and Johnson City

E-J workers paid for and erected these arches. Both arches were dedicated on September 6, 1920. They were listed on the National Register of Historic Places in 2001.

- One of the E-J swimming pools was shaped in the outline of a gigantic shoe sole.
- The Triple Cities contain a number of statues of the Johnson family, including Johnson City's statue of Harry L. Johnson (George F's youngest brother), and Binghamton's statue of George F. Johnson in the George F. Johnson Recreation Park, and, also in Recreation Park, the Harry L. Johnson memorial.
- Endicott had En-Joie Park (with E and the J capitalized to evoke E-J). Each Triple Cities Parks contained a carousel called "merry go rounds" and they also contained playground equipment, a baseball diamond, picnic areas, a large swimming pool, and a band stand. During the summer the Endicott-Johnson workers band performed concerts every Sunday evening in Endicott En-Joy Park. There were also recreation buildings in Endicott and Johnson City, which contained subsidized bowling alleys in the basement and a large banquet room on the main floor. Retirement dinners were given on a regular basis in the recreation centers. Any employee could attend the dinners for $.25.
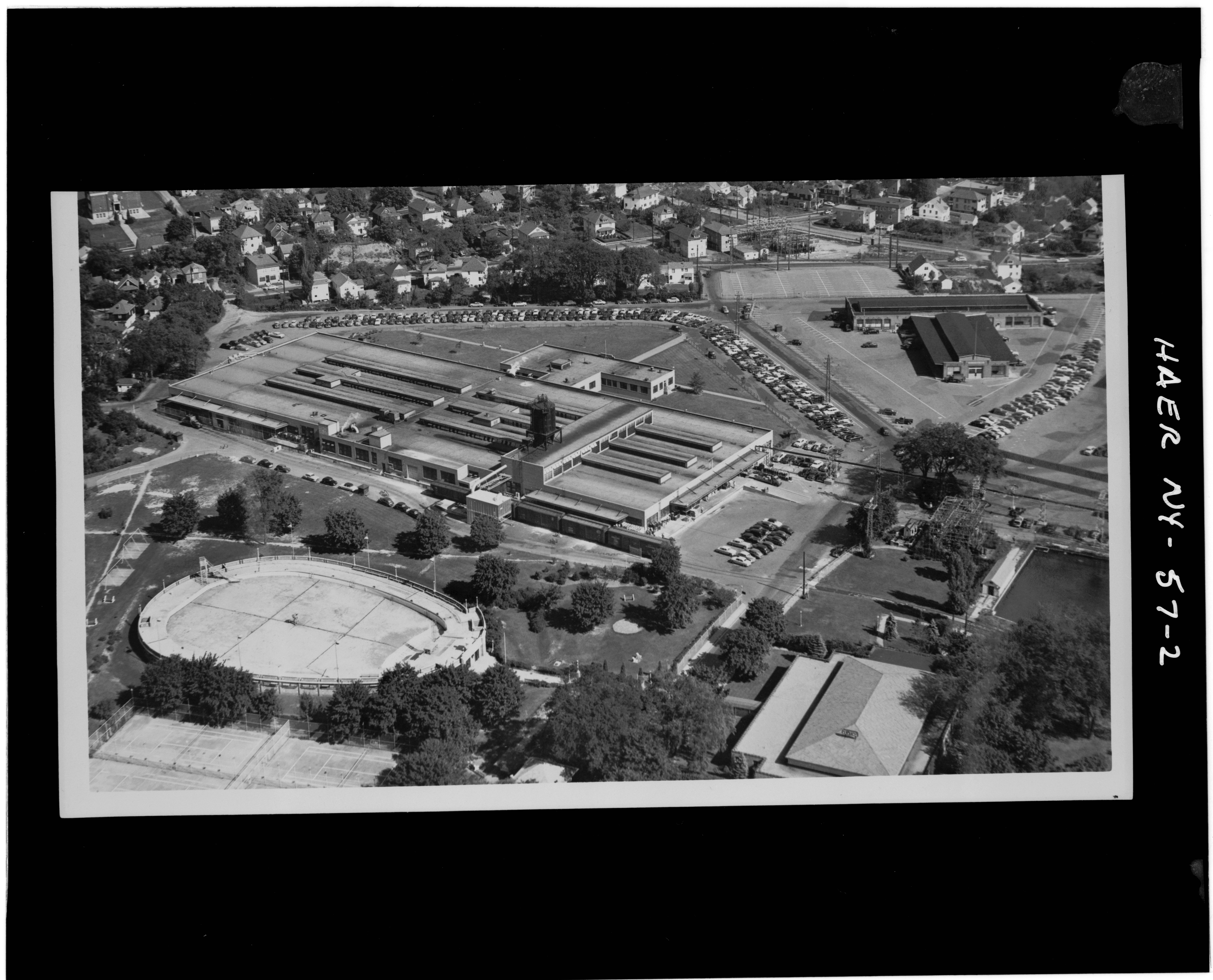
  Charles F. Johnson Pool, Charles F. Johnson Park
- Various roads and bridges refer to the Johnsons, including CFJ Boulevard in Johnson City, and the C. Fred Johnson Bridge over the Susquehanna River (part of Expressway Route 201), which was named in honor of Charles F. Johnson (an older brother of George F.)
- The word Ideal appeared in many places, including E-J's first (1901) factory in Endicott, Endicott's Ideal Home Library (contributed to Endicott by George F) and Ideal Hospital. The library was later demolished to make room for municipal facilities and relocated to George F's former mansion.

The use of repetitions and iterations of "ideal," "En-Joie," and other words (such as "Endwell" used for both a line of E-J shoes, and later in the renaming of the hamlet of Hooper to Endwell, New York) were part of E-J's ongoing public relations campaign to discourage unionizing by convincing workers that E-J's Square Deal was the "ideal" relationship between capital and labor. At the same time labor organizer Samuel Gompers visited E-J on several occasions, and spent time with both rank and file employees and with the Johnsons. When asked why no attempt had been made to organize E-J workers, Gompers said that E-J already gave workers more than unions had achieved elsewhere, and that the Federation of Labor was working to bring other workforces to the pay and benefits levels E-J provided on its own initiative.

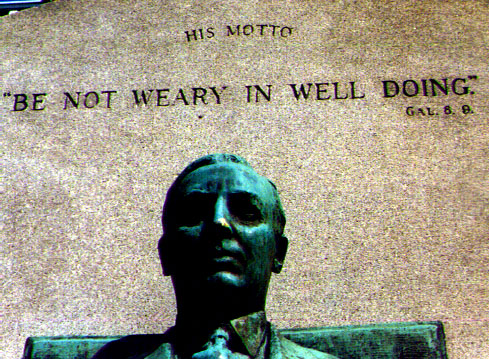
Monument to Harry L. Johnson

But the Square Deal campaign also created a cult of personality about Johnson family which is reflected, as examples:

- in the inscription in the Harry L. Johnson memorial states "This Fountain Was Given By The School Children In Memory Of Their Friend Harry L. Johnson MCMXXII;" and
- in the inscription accompanying a statue of George F. Johnson which states "Have Faith In The People. George F. Johnson. Erected By An Appreciative Community To The Nobility Of His Character And His Great Benefactions To The People. 1923. Labor Is Honorable."
- the daunting Johnson City monument displaying a bronze bust of Harry L. Johnson erected by "Endicott Johnson workers and citizens of Johnson City" which contains the Johnson motto "BE NOT WEARY IN WELL DOING." which is from the Bible Galatians 6:9

George F. Johnson memorial to Endicott-Johnson workers who fought in World War I, erected 1920 and seen in a period postcard image

== Decline and sale ==
Various members of the Johnson family helmed E-J until outside management was brought in starting in 1957. By then, the company had begun a slow decline. In 1965, E-J acquired the Nobil Shoes retail chain. The tanneries closed in 1968. E-J's medical department was not closed until 1969, and the plan to close the last of its shoe manufacturing plants in the Triple Cities area was not announced until April 1998.

The demise of the E-J was rooted in many economic changes. Its founding principles of valuing labor were threatened by the availability of cheap foreign labor and the rise of global shoemakers such as Nike. According to some sources, C. F. Johnson was a vehement critic of free trade, and believed that it was contrary to his glorification of the American worker. The demise of the company may also be attributable, in part, to bad business decisions, including the continuation of its focus during the 1950s on work shoes when the market for lighter, more stylish shoes was expanding and potentially more profitable.

In 1995, E-J was purchased by U.S. Industries, Inc. and its name was changed to EJ Footwear Corp., and its base of operations changed to Franklin, Tennessee. In 2000, EJ Footwear was bought out by Citicorp Venture Capital Ltd., a subsidiary of Citigroup.

Finally, on December 6, 2004, EJ Footwear agreed to be acquired by Rocky Shoes & Boots, Inc. EJ had previously been the sole licensee for Rocky's "Dickies" line of work footwear. According to its 2005 annual report, Rocky's sales more than doubled over 2004, largely reflecting this acquisition.

== Present day ==
The former central headquarters, located on the eastern edge of Johnson City, has been converted into a church. Most of the company's factories have been torn down, with the majority of the remaining facilities vacant, except for some that are partially occupied by area businesses. EJ Footwear, LLC persists as a subsidiary of Rocky, but all its manufacturing is outsourced. A number of its former Johnson City manufacturing facilities are included in the Johnson City Historic District, added to the National Register of Historic Places in 2011. In addition, the former Endicott-Johnson Medical Clinic at Binghamton; West Endicott Hose Company No. 1 at West Endicott; and the Endicott-Johnson Shoe Distribution Plant in St. Louis, Missouri, are listed on the National Register of Historic Places.

In the autumn of 2016, New York State Homes & Community Renewal entered into a development agreement with Affordable Housing Concepts and Libolt Construction to gut and rehabilitate the former Sunrise and Century buildings into a pair of affordable housing sites. Utilizing a combination of bond financing, historic tax credits, funding from the Johnson City and developer equity, construction commenced in the spring of 2017 and is expected to continue into 2018. The completed buildings will provide more than 80 affordable multi-bedroom apartments, and portions of the ground floors will be converted for commercial use. Additionally, the site will include a small museum displaying artifacts discovered during the construction, including machinery, signage, worker timecards and what is believed to be the first elevator car specifically designed to a maximum weight capacity

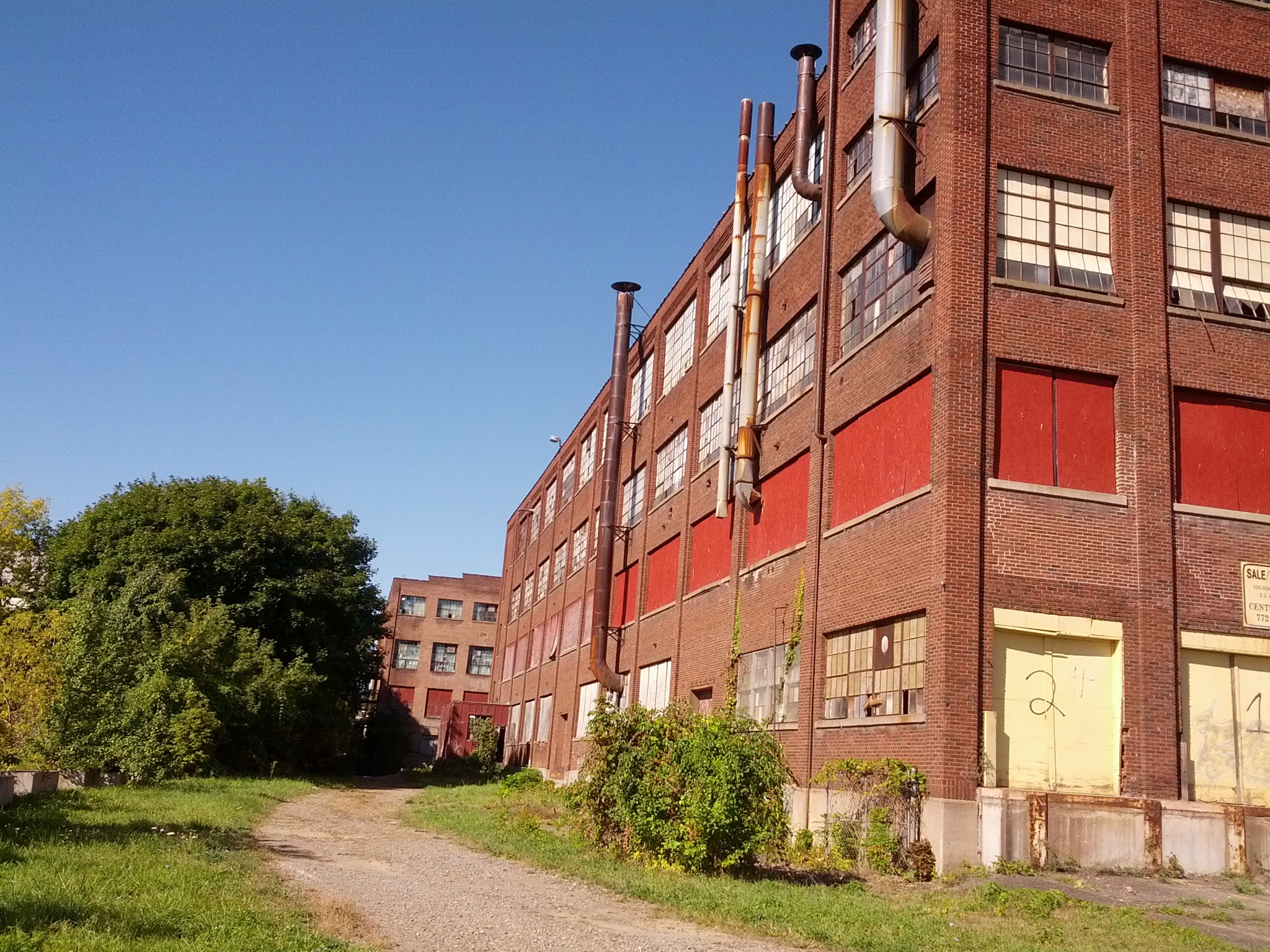
E-J Sunrise Plant, Johnson City

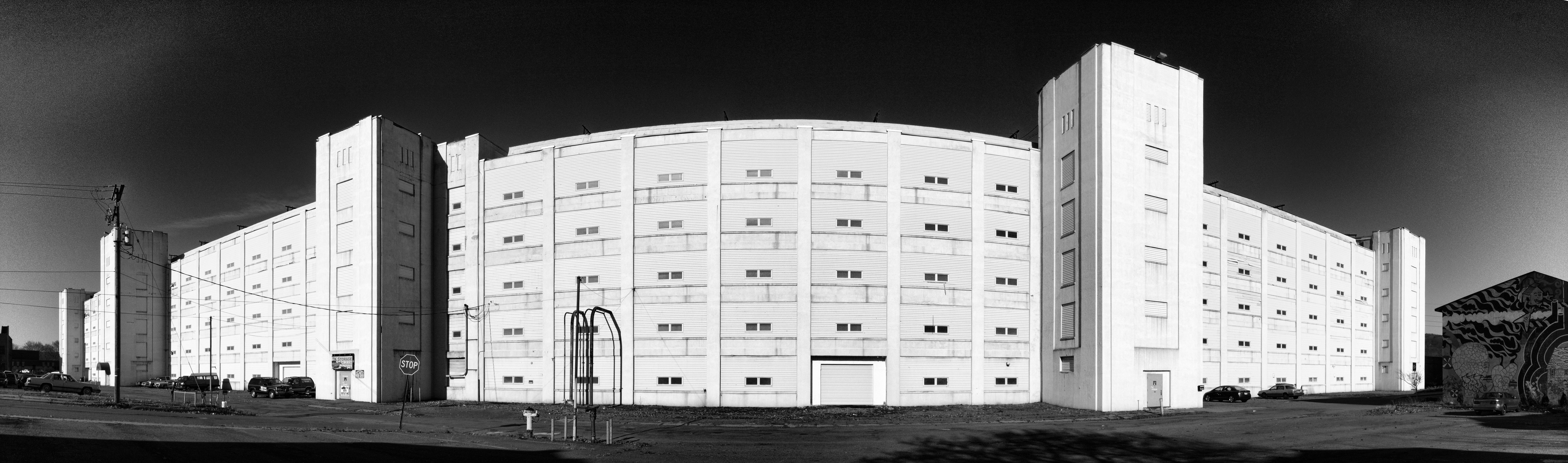
View of the E-J Victory Factory building, from 2009.

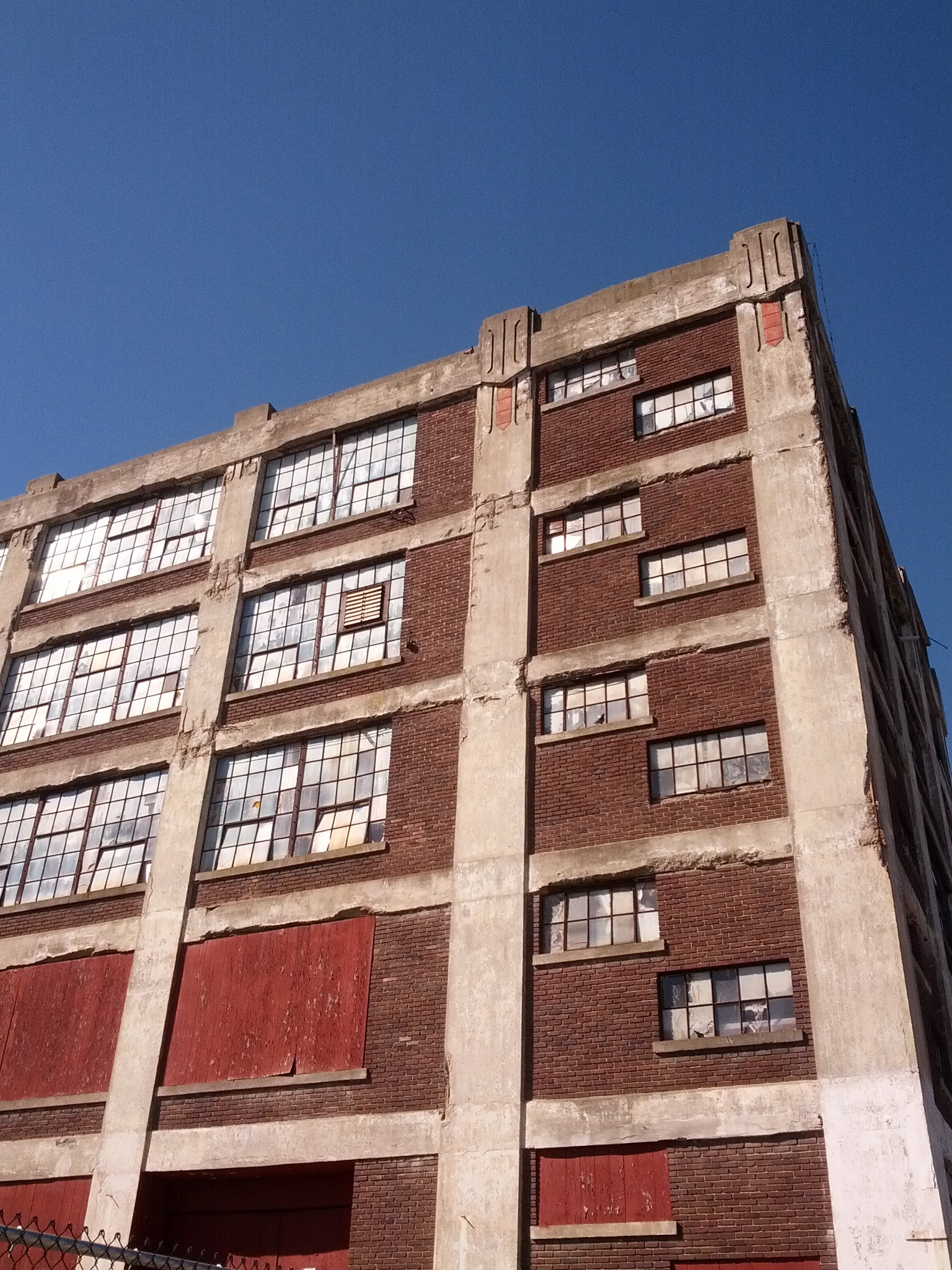
Endicott-Johnson Sunrise Plant (Defunct), Johnson City, NY

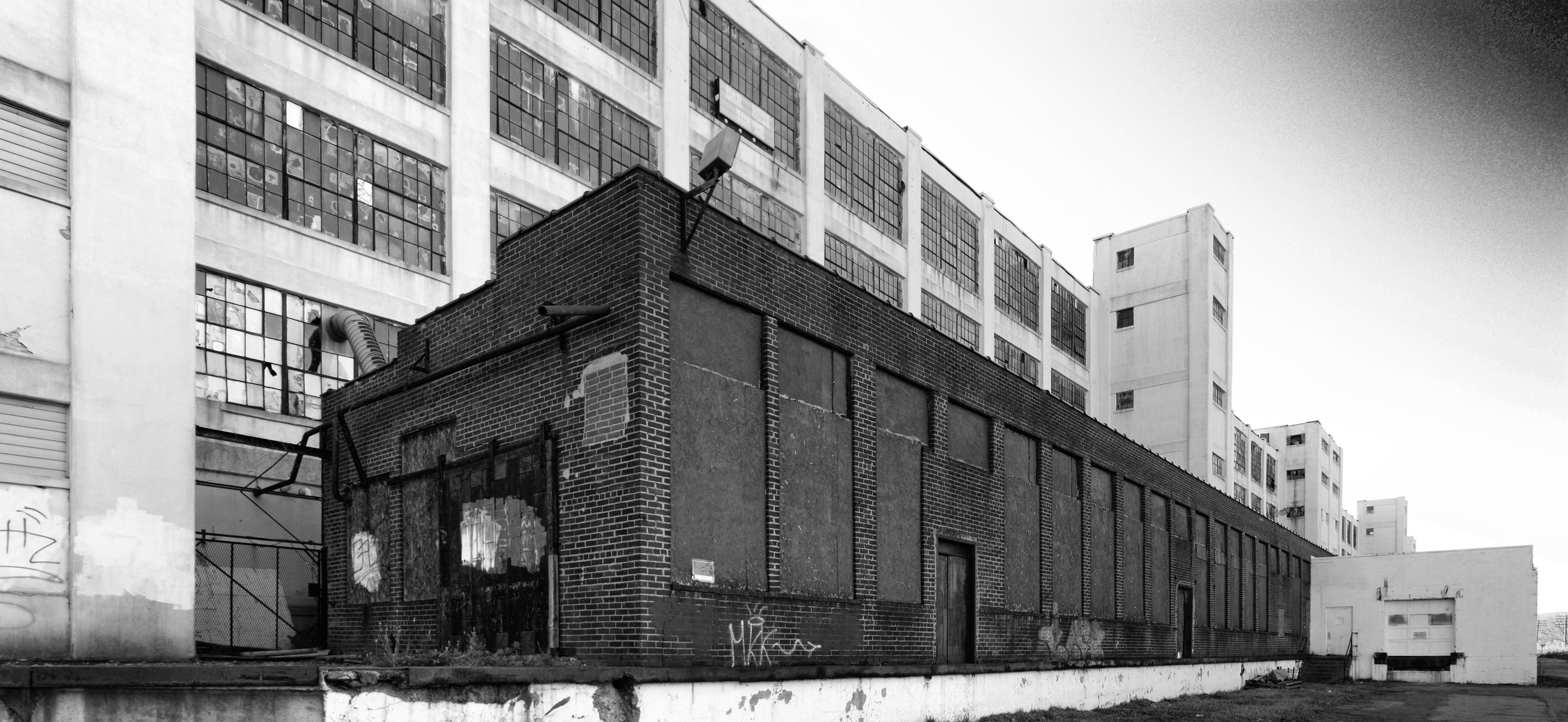
View of the E-J Victory Factory building, from 2009.

== Contribution to economy ==
The company was responsible for nearly all of the shoe and footwear for the United States Army during World War I and World War II.

At its peak, E-J was one of the largest shoe manufacturers in the U.S., with retail outlets in over 30 states. E-J was also substantially vertically integrated, with coal-fired steam generating plants to power factory machinery, and factories for tanning animal hides to make leather and for reclaiming rubber from used automobile tires for use as shoe soles.

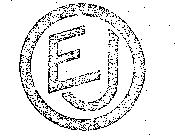

Endicott Johnson's employment policies also influenced it's neighbor in Endicott, New York, International Business Machines Corporation (IBM), as well as IBM's local predecessors , Computing-Tabulating-Recording Company and The Bundy Manufacturing Co. However, IBM later reduced their benefit programs for employees and retirees.

In the 1976 film Taxi Driver, an ad for the Endicott-Johnson Shoe Company can be seen painted on a wall while Travis is slowly following Iris.

== Carousel Capital of the World ==
George F. Johnson donated six carousels to the Triple Cities between 1919 and 1934, which are now among the fewer than 170 antique carousels remaining in the United States and Canada. All were built by the well-known carousel maker Allan Herschell (of The Herschell Carrousel Factory in North Tonawanda, New York), all contain wood-carved figures, and all are still working during the summer months subject to weather and restoration projects. Binghamton is accordingly associated with the nickname "Carousel Capital of the World," although only two of the Triple Cities' six carousels are in Binghamton. The admission price to the carousels has never changed: free (except, traditionally, to find and dispose of one piece of litter). The Highland Park Carousel, C. Fred Johnson Park Carousel, George F. Johnson Recreation Park Carousel, George W. Johnson Park Carousel, Ross Park Carousel, and West Endicott Park Carousel are listed on the National Register of Historic Places.
