= The Lonely =

- The Twilight Zone episode
- Episode no.: Season 1 Episode 7
- Directed by: Jack Smight
- Written by: Rod Serling
- Narrated by: Rod Serling
- Production code: 173-3602
- Original air date: November 13, 1959

Guest appearances
- Jack Warden as Corry; John Dehner as Allenby; Jean Marsh as Alicia; Ted Knight as Adams; James Turley as Carstairs

Episode chronology
← Previous "Escape Clause"	Next → "Time Enough at Last"
- The Twilight Zone (1959 TV series, season 1)

"The Lonely" is the seventh episode of the American television anthology series The Twilight Zone. It originally aired on November 13, 1959, on CBS.

== Opening narration ==
Witness if you will, a dungeon, made out of mountains, salt flats, and sand that stretch to infinity. The dungeon has an inmate: James A. Corry. And this is his residence: a metal shack. An old touring car that squats in the sun and goes nowhere—for there is nowhere to go. For the record, let it be known that James A. Corry is a convicted criminal placed in solitary confinement. Confinement in this case stretches as far as the eye can see, because this particular dungeon is on an asteroid nine million miles from the Earth. Now witness, if you will, a man's mind and body shriveling in the sun, a man dying of loneliness.

== Plot ==
In the space age, an inmate named Corry, convicted of murder, is sentenced to fifty years' solitary confinement on a distant asteroid. On the fifteenth day of the sixth month of the fourth year of incarceration, he is visited by the spacecraft (flown by a Captain Allenby) that brings him supplies and news from Earth four times a year. Allenby has been trying to make Corry's stay humanely tolerable by bringing him things to take his mind off the loneliness, like the components to build an old car. He believes Corry that the killing was in self-defense and sympathizes with him.

While Corry expects that perhaps he and Allenby will have time to play cards or chess, the captain informs the inmate that the ship and crew can stay only fifteen minutes this time; the asteroid's orbit is such that they would otherwise be stuck fourteen days at least, awaiting favorable orbital conditions to depart. Allenby's crew resent being away from Earth because of the likes of Corry; they delight in bringing news that Corry's pardon was rejected and that murder cases are not even being reviewed. This causes Corry to feel that there is no way he is going to last out the years and the loneliness. Before leaving, Allenby orders his men to fetch a large crate which the captain instructs Corry to not open until the transport crew is out of sight—they have no clue what is inside the box.

Upon opening this special container, Corry discovers that Allenby has left him with a gynoid named Alicia to keep him company. Alicia is capable of emotions and memory and has a lifespan comparable to a human. At first, Corry detests her, rejecting her as a mere machine; synthetic skin and wires only capable of mocking him. However, when Corry hurts Alicia and sees that she is in fact capable of crying, he realizes that she has feelings. Over the next eleven months, Corry begins to fall in love with her. Alicia develops a personality that mirrors Corry's, and the days become bearable.

When the ship returns, Captain Allenby brings news that the murder cases have been reviewed and Corry has been pardoned. He can return home to Earth immediately but they only have twenty minutes before they must leave; the crew has been dodging meteors and are nearly out of fuel. Corry learns that, because there are seven other passengers from other asteroids on the ship, there is only room for him and fifteen pounds of luggage. He is initially unconcerned as he does not have fifteen pounds' worth of possessions that he cares about; then he realizes that Allenby does not consider Alicia human. The fifteen-pound limit is far too small to accommodate her. He frantically tries to find some way to take Alicia with him, arguing that she is not a robot, but a woman, and insisting that Allenby simply does not know Alicia as he does. At that point, just as the transport crew is surprised at the sight of Alicia, the captain suddenly draws his gun and shoots her in the face. The robot breaks down, malfunctioning, her face a mass of wire and broken circuitry which repeats the name "Corry". Allenby then takes Corry back to the ship, assuring him he will only be leaving behind loneliness. "I must remember that," Corry says tonelessly. "I must remember to keep that in mind."

== Closing narration ==
On a microscopic piece of sand that floats through space is a fragment of a man's life. Left to rust is the place he lived in and the machines he used. Without use, they will disintegrate from the wind and the sand and the years that act upon them. All of Mr. Corry's machines, including the one made in his image, kept alive by love, but now obsolete—in The Twilight Zone.

== Preview for next week's story ==
Next week, a distinguished actor lends us his talents as Mr. Burgess Meredith stars in "Time Enough at Last", the story of a man who seeks salvation in the rubble of a ruined world. We hope you'll share this very strange experience with us. Thank you and good night.

== Other media ==
An audio adaptation of "The Lonely", featuring Mike Starr as Corry, was produced for radio in the mid-2000s; it was released on CD by CBS Consumer Products in 2007 as part of The Twilight Zone Radio Dramas Vol. 4.

In 2007, "The Lonely" was produced for the stage by 4 Letter Entertainment.

== Production information ==
"The Lonely" was the first regular episode to enter production following the success of the pilot episode, "Where Is Everybody?" in selling the series.

It was the first of several episodes (including "I Shot an Arrow into the Air", "A Hundred Yards Over the Rim" and "The Rip Van Winkle Caper") to be filmed on location in Death Valley. Unprepared for the terrible conditions they would face, the crew suffered extreme dehydration and heat exhaustion and director of photography George T. Clemens even collapsed, falling from a camera crane while filming continued.

For reasons unknown, Ted Knight is not listed in the episode credits.
