= Henry Bradford Endicott =

American businessman

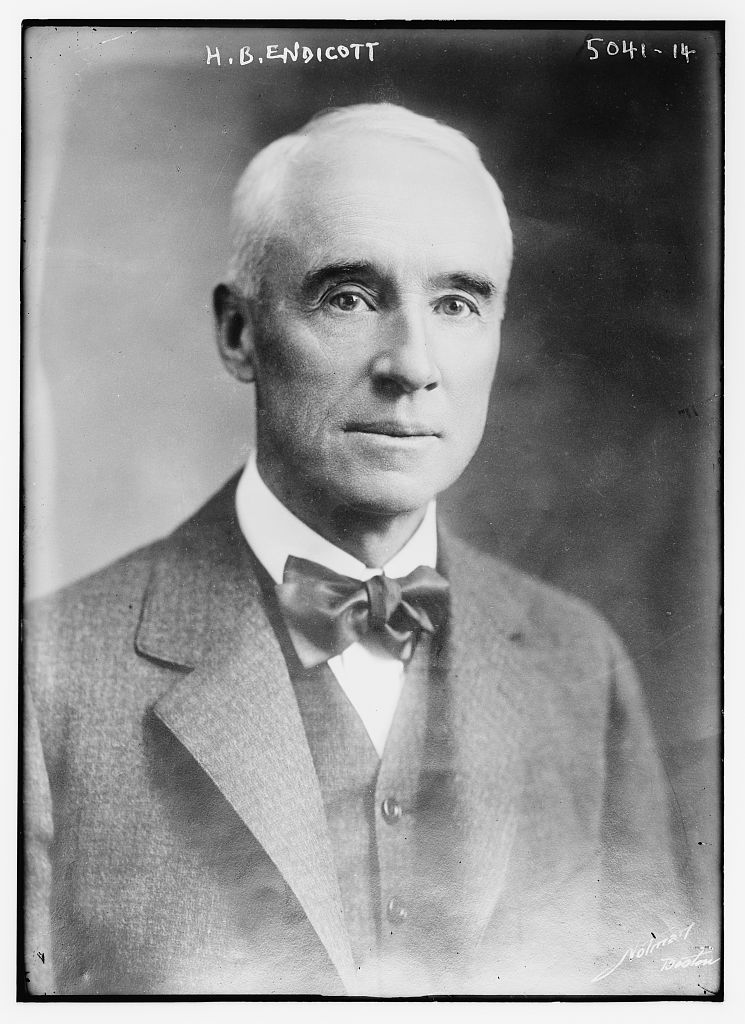
- Henry Bradford Endicott c. 1915
- Born: September 11, 1853; Dedham, Massachusetts, US
- Died: February 12, 1920 (aged 66); Brookline, Massachusetts, US
- Education: Dedham High School
- Known for: Founder of the Endicott Johnson Corporation
- Father: Augustus Bradford Endicott
- Relatives: Katherine Endicott (step-daughter); Philip E. Young (nephew)

Henry Bradford Endicott (September 11, 1853 – February 12, 1920) was the founder of the Endicott Johnson Corporation as well as the builder of the Endicott Estate, in Dedham, Massachusetts. During World War I he served in numerous public capacities, including as a labor strike negotiator and as director of the Massachusetts Committee on Public Safety.

The village of Endicott, New York was named for him.

== Early life, family and education ==
Henry Bradford Endicott was born in the family homestead in Dedham, the son of Augustus Bradford Endicott, a businessman and state and local official, and Sarah Fairbanks. He was a descendant of John Endecott, the first governor of Massachusetts, on his father's side and direct descendant of Jonathan Fairbanks on his mother's. He was graduated from Dedham High School after three years.

== Business career ==
Endicott spent his boyhood on the farm of his father where his first venture into business was to sell the milk of the farm, the profits of which be divided with his mother. He then worked at a plumber's shop, but he was fired for leaving work to attend the Massachusetts State Fair in Reading even though he was told he would be fired for doing so.

At age 22, he went in business for himself. He had obtained work in the leather district, and, having acquired a little experience and modest capital, he launched the firm of H.B. Endicott & Co. Headquartered at 27 High Street in Boston, a few doors down from the offices of the later Endicott Johnson Corporation 10 High Street, his company dealt in sheepskins. After he became treasurer of the Commonwealth Shoe & Leather Company, he entered the shoe manufacturing business. Endicott went to the factory of the Lestershire Boot & Shoe Company near Binghamton, New York, to investigate an order of leather his company had made from them. He was their principal creditor, and the company had fallen into financial difficulties in 1890. Recognizing the potential of the company, he bought it. Under his ownership, the renamed Lestershire Manufacturing Company grew to many times its original size. He sold half of the company to the company's foreman, George F. Johnson, but as Johnson did not have enough any money Endicott loaned him $150,000. Their company became the Endicott Johnson Corporation. He operated factories in New York and had tanneries in Maine and Massachusetts.

He was one of the largest employers in the country but there was never a strike at any of his factories, and he did not hesitate to fraternize with his employees. He once stepped into the lunch room at a factory and, sitting beside a group of his employees, he ate a frugal meal which did not cost more than 15 cents. He chatted with the men at his side and spoke complimentary of the meal.

During World War I, he made a million dollars or more in profit. Endicott also served as director of the Chase National Bank of New York, the United Shoe Machinery Corporation, the State Street Trust Company, and of the United States Smelting and Refining Company. He joined the board of Shawmut Bank after the Third National Bank closed merged with it. In 1920 he called on workers to speed up production, but said that employers must make "the conditions under which the work is speeded up as bright, sunny, comfortable and attractive as possible in all ways."

When the US government brought a lawsuit against United Shoe pursuant to the Sherman Anti-Trust Act, it named Endicott as a defendant. One of the chief antagonists the case was Louis Brandeis, who was also from Dedham, Massachusetts.

== Charities and public service ==
Within 12 hours of the 1917 Halifax Explosion, Endicott organized and sent a relief train to help with the recovery. It was an accomplishment which testified to his remarkable executive ability and power as an organizer for the train left the North Station bearing a large force of doctors and nurses that was assembled in haste from all over the state, as well as supplies. He served as chairman of the Massachusetts–Halifax Relief Commission.

He was chairman of the Emergency Public Health Committee during the influenza epidemic of 1918, rallying the forces of the state to combat the disease. It is estimated that the service of this committee saved 10,000 lives. He also regularly gave out free shoes to those in need. Endicott was generous in providing means for public improvement in his native town of Dedham. and showered gifts upon the New York town where his shoe factory was located, including a $50,000 clubhouse and every Christmas for many years he gave "a small sized fortune to the poor people of that town." In 1919 it was for $10,000.

=== World War I ===
He was appointed by Governor Samuel W. McCall as food administrator and the executive manager of the Massachusetts Committee on Public Safety during World War I. His activities in these two posts kept him constantly in the public eye and it was through his interest in seeing that Massachusetts and New England kept its resources unremittingly behind the government in the prosecution of the war that he first entered the industrial field as an adjuster of disputes. As executive manager of the public safety committee he first directed a general inventory of the state s resources available to aid in the war. As food administrator he laid out a program of food conservation and regulation which was imitated throughout the nation.

During this time he was a dollar-a-year man, taking only $1 in salary, and he tore up the lawn on the Sanderson Street side of his estate to grow potatoes and other vegetables in order to support the war effort and show the need for Victory Gardens. Endicott also took out $1 million in liberty bonds from his personal account, and an equal amount from his company's.

When Endicott resigned from his war commission appointments, Governor McCall stated:

Let me say here that nothing could exceed the patriotism and efficiency of the work you have rendered. I understand that from the time you were appointed until yesterday, a period of 23 months, you have not once been to your place of business. I know that you have devoted yourself wholly to the patriotic work of rendering service to the country in the sore time through which we have passed.

Endicott himself said that

I am not a politician. I do not want any public office in this State or in the nation. My sole object in doing the work I am engaged in is to render the public such service as I am capable of—a duty I feel incumbent on every citizen of this country in this crisis. I am enlisted for the war. All my energies, all my time, my business experience, and knowledge of affairs I willingly and gladly give the State and nation. I shall feel amply repaid if I can convince myself that I have been able to contribute something in behalf of the common cause in which the United States is engaged—the defeat of Prussianism and autocracy and the triumph of democracy as we understand it in America.

In his war work Endicott never hesitated to cut red tape when by so doing he made the work of his department more efficient and brought speedier and more satisfactory results. He said "This is the way that private business is run. No private business could be run the way the government conducts its business. It would be in the hands of a receiver in no time."

== Labor disputes ==
Endicott enjoyed the confidence of both labor and capital, and he was called upon over and over again to adjust disputes which had engendered much bitter feeling on both sides. Endicott was also appointed by the governor as a strike mediator and settled over 100 strikes, including ones at the Boston and Maine railroad, the elevated Boston railroad companies, and in factories around New England. In a single year he settled disputes affecting over 100,000 workers.

He said that when attempting to end a strike "The first principle is to give a square deal to both employer and employee." When asked for a specific case, Endicott cited the Boston Elevated Railway strike, saying the carmen demanded 73 cents an hour and that the trustees were only willing to give 53 cents. After investigating the wages paid to the carmen in other large cities, he settled on 60 cents an hour, saying that it was only a fair wage when the importance of the men's work was considered.

His reputation brought him appointment by President Woodrow Wilson as one of 15 public representatives at the National Labor Conference in Washington, D.C., in October 1919. He was disappointed with the results of the conference.

== Endicott Estate ==
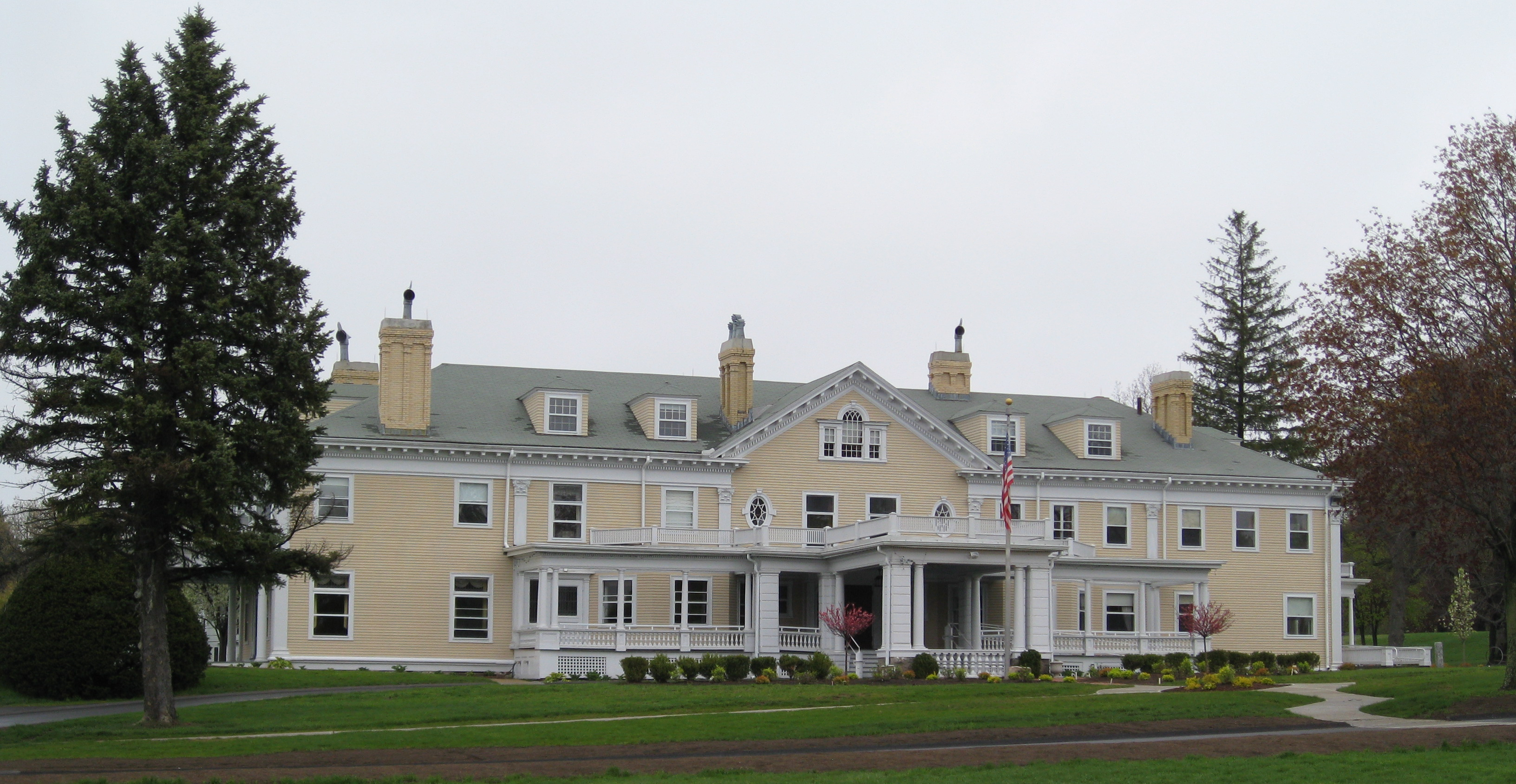
The Endicott Estate

On January 12, 1904, Endicott's home burnt to the ground while he and his family were away. The fire department was not able to get to the estate in time as they were dealing with three other fires simultaneously, including one at the fire house, and deep snow. The fire was discovered around 10 p.m. by a caretaker who lived in the house. It took several hours to extinguish the flames. The house and furnishings were valued at more than $15,000.

It is said that "Henry took the burning of the homestead as a divine command to rebuild, and rebuild he did, although not without incident." He cleared the ashes away and built a new homestead on the 15-acre (61,000 m^{2}) parcel, today known as the Endicott Estate, and bought a new fire truck for the Town.

The three-story building he constructed has nine bathrooms, eight bedrooms, a library, a music room, a ballroom, a mirrored parlor, a butler's kitchen, a linen room, and servants' quarters. When a radiator burst during the construction, "causing a raging river to crash down the main stairway," he tore down one end of the house and burned a pile of beautiful wall paneling, parquet floors, and elegant woodwork, much to the dismay of his neighbors. An additional 70 feet was then added onto the house. While he was building his mansion, his distant cousins were living in the Fairbanks House just .3 miles (0.48 km) away without electricity or indoor plumbing.

When he died in 1920 he left the building to his wife, who in turn left it to her daughter Katherine in 1944. Katherine died in 1967 without any children and willed the land and the estate to the town for "public educational purposes, public recreational purposes, or other exclusively public purposes." At the time "town didn't know quite what to do with it" and it was given to the Commonwealth to be used as a governor's mansion, but those plans were scuttled. What was a nine car garage on the Mt. Vernon Street side of the property today serves as the Endicott branch of the Dedham Public Library.

== Personal life and demise ==
He had two children, Henry Wendell and Gertrude Adele, with his first wife, Caroline Williams Russell, whom he married on May 23, 1876. (Note: Caroline was the daughter of Ira and Louisa (French) Russell. She was born in Dedham on June 15, 1853 and died on October 1, 1931.) They divorced in 1904. He remarried in Rye Beach, New Hampshire to fellow Dedhamite Louise Clapp Colburn, a widow with two children from her first marriage to Isaac Colburn (1853–1914), Samuel Clapp Colburn and Katherine Farwell Colburn. He adopted the Colburn children in 1916. He was the uncle, through his sister Elizabeth, of Phillip E. Young.

Endicott liked to hunt and he enjoyed cigars. When about to smoke in the company of a close friend, it was characteristic of him that he would pull a cigar from his vest pocket, clinch it with his teeth and, taking another perfecto from his vest, he would vigorously thrust it into the mouth of his companion.

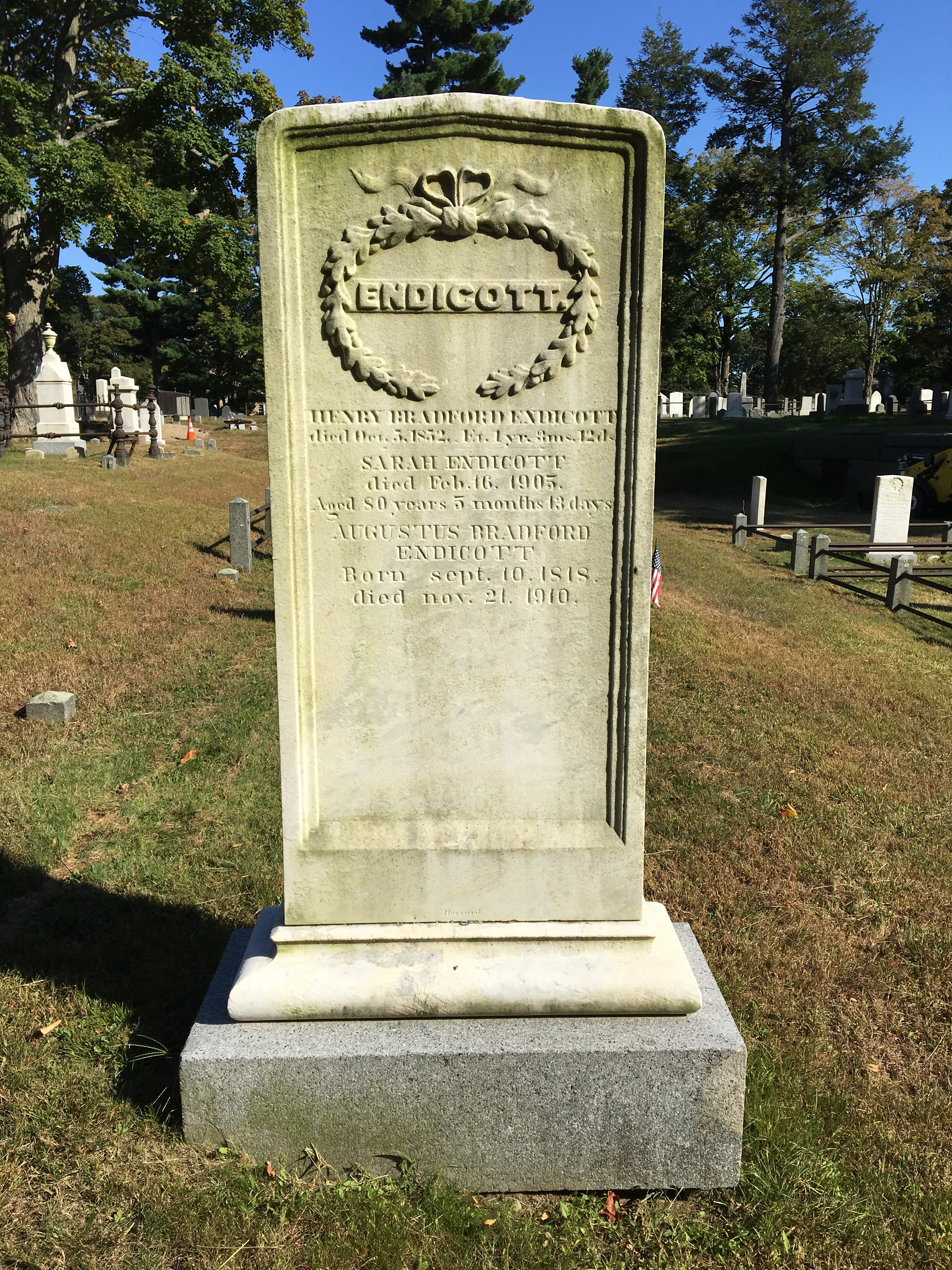
Henry B. Endicott's grave

=== Death and funeral ===
In January 1920, while on a hunting trip in North Carolina with other Boston men, which was meant to be a vacation from his public and business affairs, he came down with influenza. The frequent and intense headaches he suffered on the return trip caused him to take up residence at the Hotel Touraine rather than at his home in Dedham so to be closer to his doctors. He was taken to Brooks Hospital in Brookline on February 10 where he underwent surgery, but he remained delirious until his death on February 12. His family was at his bedside. Endicott died of spinal meningitis.

A simple funeral service occurred in the home of Clarence W. Barron at 334 Beacon Street in Boston. A number of prominent men, including Harvard president A. Lawrence Lowell, served as pallbearers at his funeral, with Governors Calvin Coolidge and McCall serving as the head pallbearers. (Note: Others include AC Brown of St Louis, Dr. WA Brooks, B. Preston Clark, FW Curtis of Reading, Pennsylvania, the Rev Paul Revere Frothingham, George F. Johnson, EW Longley, Matthew Luce, George H. Lyman, W. Rodman Peabody, James J. Phelan. AC Ratshesky, James L. Richards, Joseph B. Russell, Frederick E. Snow, John F. Stevens, James J. Storrow, and Robert Winsor.) The funeral was led by James Hardy Ropes, dean of the Harvard University Extension School. He was buried in the Forest Hills Cemetery. McCall and Coolidge issued statements upon his death, with the former saying that he would "take rank with the great patriots of Massachusetts."

President Woodrow Wilson telegrammed his condolence to Louise Endicott, saying "Permit me to express our heartfelt sympathy with you in your bereavement. Mr Endicott's disinterested and public spirited services have made the country his debtor. His loss is a real one." The presidential message of sympathy was only one of scores from all parts of the United States. The Wall Street Journal ran an editorial praising him saying that it was rare to find someone so adept at both business and statesmanship.

=== Legacy ===
The two executors of his will each posted $18 million bonds, the largest ever in Norfolk County. The "shoe king's" estate was worth $11,674,976 in personal property and $92,500 in real estate, including $3.9 million in 'liberty bonds and $6.2 million in Endicott Johnson stock, large amounts of other stock and bonds, and $873,990 in cash. He left nearly the entire amount to his immediate family, with some friends and old servants receiving small bequests.

His obituary ran in newspapers across the country. After news of his death reached the stock market, the stock price of the Endicott Johnson Corporation tumbled. In 1928, his estate received a tax refund of $546,599, one of the largest in the country.

In 1921 Endicott's widow Louise gave $35,000 to the American Legion to build a clubhouse nearby the family Estate on Whiting Ave. His daughter Gertrude pre-deceased him.

== Works cited ==
- McQuillen, H. H. (December 1889). Historical Catalogue of the Dedham High School, Teachers and Students, 1851-1889. Dedham (Mass.). High School.
