= Endicott Square Deal Arch =

- U.S. National Register of Historic Places
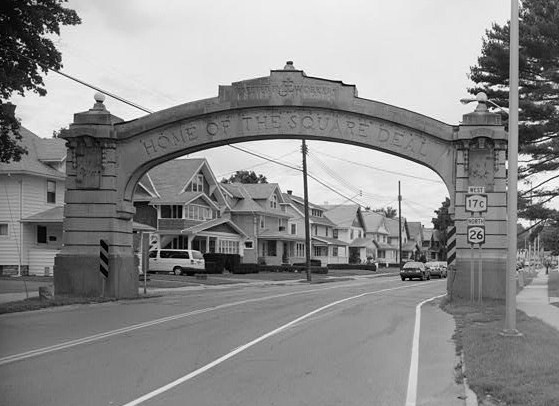
- Endicott Square Deal Arch, undated

- Location within New York Location within the United States
- Location: Main St., E of Vestal Ave., Endicott, New York
- Coordinates: 42°6′41″N 75°56′46″W
- Area: less than one acre
- Built: 1920 and demolished in 2026
- Built by: E. H. Tyler
- Architect: T. I. Lacey & Son
- Architectural style: Classical Revival
- Restored: 1995
- Restored by: NYSDOT
- NRHP reference No.: 01000171
- Added to NRHP: February 23, 2001

Endicott Square Deal Arch is an historic "welcome arch" located at Endicott in Broome County, New York. It is one of two identical arches erected in 1920 in Endicott and in nearby Johnson City, known as the Johnson City Square Deal Arch. . It was constructed by Endicott-Johnson Shoe Company employees to honor George F. Johnson (1857–1948), their highly respected employer and benefactor.

In 1995 the arch was dismantled and rebuilt with additional materials to increase clearance and span a widened Main Street.

It was listed on the National Register of Historic Places in 2001.
