= Walking Distance =

- The Twilight Zone episode
- Episode no.: Season 1 Episode 5
- Directed by: Robert Stevens
- Written by: Rod Serling
- Production code: 173-3605
- Original air date: October 30, 1959

Guest appearances
- Gig Young as Martin Sloan; Frank Overton as Robert Sloan; Irene Tedrow as Mrs. Sloan; Michael Montgomery as Young Martin Sloan; Ron Howard as Wilcox Boy; Byron Foulger as Charlie; Sheridan Comerate as Gas Station Attendant; Joseph Corey as Soda Jerk; Nan Peterson as Woman in Park; Pat O'Malley as Mr. Wilson

Episode chronology
← Previous "The Sixteen-Millimeter Shrine"	Next → "Escape Clause"
- The Twilight Zone (1959 TV series, season 1)

"Walking Distance" is episode five of the American television series The Twilight Zone. It originally aired on October 30, 1959. The episode was listed as the ninth best episode in the history of The Twilight Zone by Time magazine.

== Opening narration ==
Martin Sloan, age thirty-six. Occupation: vice-president, ad agency, in charge of media. This is not just a Sunday drive for Martin Sloan. He perhaps doesn't know it at the time, but it's an exodus. Somewhere up the road he's looking for sanity. And somewhere up the road, he'll find something else.

== Plot ==
While driving his car in the countryside on a summer afternoon circa 1955, 36-year-old New York advertising executive Martin Sloan stops to have his car serviced at a gas station within walking distance of Homewood, his hometown. After walking into town, he sees that it apparently has not changed since he was a boy. He visits the drugstore, and he is confused when he finds out that ice cream sodas are still only 10 cents.

Martin walks to the town park, where he is startled to see himself as a young boy, carving his name into the bandstand, exactly as he remembers doing. Martin approaches, resulting in preteen Martin becoming scared, believing himself to be in trouble, and he runs away. Following his younger self home, he meets his parents as they were in his childhood, but he is turned away. He sees the next door neighbor, a teen boy working on his brand new roadster; Martin soon discovers that it is the year 1934. In a rare moment in The Twilight Zone, Serling has an additional voice-over narration halfway through the episode, just after the station break:

A man can think a lot of thoughts and walk a lot of pavements between afternoon and night. And to a man like Martin Sloan, to whom memory has suddenly become reality, a resolve can come just as clearly and inexorably as stars in the summer night. Martin Sloan is now back in time. And his resolve is to put in a claim to the past.

Confused and worried, Martin wanders around town and ends up at his former home again later that evening, where he again tries to convince his parents who he is by showing his identification, but he is slapped by his mother and rejected.

Martin wanders back to the park and finds his preteen self on a carousel. His advances again frighten young Martin, who falls off the merry-go-round and injures his leg. Simultaneously, adult Martin experiences excruciating pain in his leg due to the effect of the injury propagating through time to his adult self. The carousel is stopped, and Martin tries to tell his younger self to enjoy his boyhood while it lasts.

After 11-year-old Martin is carried away, adult Martin, sitting dejectedly on the carousel, is joined by his father who tells him young Martin will be all right, but will have a limp. He also tells him that having seen money with future dates and adult Martin's driver's license (with a 1960 expiration date) from Martin's wallet, which he had dropped at the house during the confrontation earlier, he now believes Martin's story. Martin's father advises his son that everyone has his time and that instead of looking behind him, he should look ahead; as delightful and rewarding as he may remember childhood to be, adulthood holds its own delights and rewards.

When Martin walks back into the drugstore, he finds himself back in 1959, where ice cream sodas are now 35 cents. He discovers that he now has a limp from the carousel injury. Martin then makes his way back to the gas station where he picks up his car. He drives away, content for once to live his life in his own age group.

== Closing narration ==
Martin Sloan, age thirty-six, vice-president in charge of media. Successful in most things but not in the one effort that all men try at some time in their lives—trying to go home again. And also like all men, perhaps there'll be an occasion, maybe a summer night sometime, when he'll look up from what he's doing and listen to the distant music of a calliope, and hear the voices and the laughter of the people and the places of his past. And perhaps across his mind there'll flit a little errant wish, that a man might not have to become old, never outgrow the parks and the merry-go-rounds of his youth. And he'll smile then too, because he'll know it is just an errant wish, some wisp of memory not too important really, some laughing ghosts that cross a man's mind, that are a part of the Twilight Zone.

== Preview for next week's story ==
An excursion into fantasy on The Twilight Zone next week as two distinguished actors, Mr. David Wayne and Mr. Thomas Gomez, appear in "Escape Clause", the story of a strange contract between a mortal man and his most satanic majesty; a contract that ends most surprisingly. We hope you'll be around to see what that surprise is. Thank you and good night.

== Production ==
Unlike some episodes of the show that were accompanied by pre-composed stock music cues, Walking Distance was underscored with music specially written for it. As with other Twilight Zone episodes, Bernard Herrmann—also composer of the first season's main title music and some of its stock music—wrote the music for this one. The intimate score has an isolated running time of about 19 minutes, and it is played by a 19-piece-orchestra consisting of strings (violins, violas, cellos, basses) and one harp.

The park in this episode is said to be inspired by Recreation Park in Binghamton, New York, which is located about five blocks away from Rod Serling's childhood home. Like the park in "Walking Distance", Recreation Park has a carousel and a bandstand. The carousel is now adorned with The Twilight Zone-inspired artwork, and there is a plaque in the bandstand commemorating the episode. In 2024 a statue of Serling was placed nearby in the park. The plaque and the episode are referenced heavily in the 2014 film The Rewrite, which is mostly set in Binghamton.

== Themes ==
Rod Serling, who wrote the episode, once commented, "Every writer has his own special preoccupations and predilections. For me, it's a hunger to be young again. A desperate hunger to go back to where it all began." Similar themes of nostalgia, its potential risks, the relentless pressures of the business world, and the disillusionments that come with being an adult are explored in "A Stop at Willoughby", "Young Man's Fancy", "The Incredible World of Horace Ford", "Of Late I Think of Cliffordville", "Kick the Can", and to a lesser extent, "The Brain Center at Whipple's", as well as two Serling teleplays from before and after The Twilight Zone: The Kraft Television Theatre episode "Patterns" and the Night Gallery episode "They're Tearing Down Tim Riley's Bar".

== Critical response ==
"Walking Distance" has continued to be one of the more popular and critically acclaimed of all Twilight Zone episodes. Paul Mandell of American Cinematographer wrote: "[Walking Distance] was the most personal story Serling ever wrote, and easily the most sensitive dramatic fantasy in the history of television." The episode was listed as the ninth best episode in the history of the series by Time in celebration of the series' 50th anniversary.

In an audio recording of an early 1970s lecture at Ithaca College included in Twilight Zone DVD packages, Serling was critical toward the episode, feeling in retrospect that his relative inexperience as a writer at the time was apparent in the screenplay. However, his daughter Jodi Serling said in a 2019 interview with SyFy Wire that "Walking Distance" was her father's favorite episode of the show because it was "a very personal story for him" and there were "pieces of him in it". She stated it was her favorite episode as well due to her father's connection to it, saying: "My father every summer would take a ride from our place on Cayuga Lake, which is in Ithaca, New York, and he would ride an hour to Binghamton, New York, and revisit his hometown. It was like his private journey of seeing his old house. It's still there on Bennett Ave., going on the merry-go-round — which isn't the same merry-go-round — and walking the streets as he did when he played marbles with his friends. That episode is so nostalgic [for me] because it's so much about my dad. I can't help but see him."

== Soundtrack releases ==
Due to the high popularity of the episode and the music, the score has received several releases on CD in its original film version in monoaural sound and two re-recordings in stereo as well, one done by Joel McNeely with the Royal Scottish National Orchestra (the only complete version) and the other by William T. Stromberg conducting the Moscow Symphony Orchestra. Orchestrator John Morgan enlarged all sections of the orchestra for the latter, referring to Samuel Barber's Adagio for Strings as Herrmann's main influence on the score in the liner notes. Composer/pianist Tom Alexander included the piece "Excerpts from Walking Distance" on his 2016 solo piano album Overbrook Avenue.
