= Mr. Denton on Doomsday =

- The Twilight Zone episode
- Episode no.: Season 1 Episode 3
- Directed by: Allen Reisner
- Written by: Rod Serling
- Cinematography by: George T. Clemens
- Production code: 173-3609
- Original air date: October 16, 1959

Guest appearances
- Dan Duryea as Al Denton; Martin Landau as Dan Hotaling; Jeanne Cooper as Liz Smith; Malcolm Atterbury as Henry J. Fate; Doug McClure as Pete Grant; Ken Lynch as Charlie; Bill Erwin as Man at the Bar

Episode chronology
← Previous "One for the Angels"	Next → "The Sixteen-Millimeter Shrine"
- The Twilight Zone (1959 TV series, season 1)

"Mr. Denton on Doomsday" is episode three of the American television anthology series The Twilight Zone. It originally aired on October 16, 1959 on CBS. It was the first Twilight Zone episode to be rerun.

== Opening narration ==
Portrait of a town drunk named Al Denton. This is a man who's begun his dying early—a long, agonizing route through a maze of bottles. Al Denton, who would probably give an arm or a leg or a part of his soul to have another chance, to be able to rise up and shake the dirt from his body and the bad dreams that infest his consciousness. [The camera pans up to a figure standing before a stagecoach] In the parlance of the times, this is a peddler, a rather fanciful-looking little man in a black frock coat. [A revolver mysteriously appears on the ground next to Denton] And this is the third principal character of our story. Its function: perhaps to give Mr. Al Denton his second chance.

== Plot ==
Al Denton was once known as the quickest draw in town, but riddled with increasing guilt over the losers in his gun duels (one of whom was a teenage boy), he became an alcoholic wreck and the laughingstock of the community. A mysterious salesman named Henry J. Fate causes Denton to inexplicably regain his expert shooting touch and once again inspire the respect and awe of the townsfolk; Denton explains to Liz, a saloon girl, that this will only cause reputation-hungry gunslingers from miles around to seek him out and, inevitably, kill him. He cleans himself up and goes sober but only, he says, so as to die with dignity. Just as Denton predicted, soon enough a challenge is delivered which Denton dares not refuse.

The still-weary and not-so-sure-handed Denton practices in the desert for his suicidal duel, but he misses his targets miserably and concludes that he must skip town. As he packs his things and tries to flee under the cover of night, he strikes up a conversation with Fate, who seems to know things about Denton and offers him a way out. Fate offers him a potion guaranteed to make the drinker the fastest gun in the West for exactly ten seconds. Denton is skeptical but Fate goads him into drinking a free sample, after which Denton immediately realizes its benefits.

At the appointed time, Denton faces his challenger, Pete Grant, a brash young gunfighter. Denton downs his potion only to find his opponent holding an identical empty bottle. Grant and Denton both realize that Fate tricked them, but it is too late to back out of the duel. Each man shoots the other in the hand, causing injuries which are minor but forever ruin both men's ability to pull a trigger.

Denton tells his young opponent that they have both been blessed because they will never again be able to fire a gun in anger. He tells Liz that Grant is lucky because he was given this lesson early. Henry J. Fate tips his hat to Denton and rides quietly out of town.

== Closing narration ==
Mr. Henry Fate, dealer in utensils and pots and pans, liniments and potions. A fanciful little man in a black frock coat who can help a man climbing out of a pit—or another man from falling into one. Because, you see, fate can work that way, in the Twilight Zone.

== Preview for next week's story ==
This motion picture projector and this film provide a background in next week's story when a most distinguished actress takes a journey into The Twilight Zone. Ms. Ida Lupino stars in "The Sixteen-Millimeter Shrine," a haunting story of a haunted woman, that I think you'll find interesting and perhaps shocking. We hope you'll join us then. Thank you and good night.

== Episode notes ==
In his 1959 promotional film shown to potential sponsors, Rod Serling summarized an earlier version of this episode's plot under its original title, "Death, Destry, and Mr. Dingle". As told by Serling, the basic premise is similar, but the earlier version seems to have been more comedic in tone, involving a meek schoolteacher who quite unintentionally gains notoriety as a top gunslinger. The name "Mr. Dingle" (originally intended for the Dan Duryea character) would be used by Serling for a future episode, with Burgess Meredith playing the eponymous character in "Mr. Dingle, the Strong" in 1961. The harmonica in the background is playing the Russian folksong "Stenka Razin" (the melody of which was later adapted for the 1965 hit "The Carnival Is Over" by The Seekers).

Al Denton's speech to Liz Smith, in which he describes having been a top gunfighter until he turned to drink after being "called out" by a 16-year-old boy, was parodied in the Mel Brooks comedy Blazing Saddles. In that film, the Waco Kid (Gene Wilder) had also been a top gunfighter until he was challenged (and shot) by a six-year-old child, leading him to become an alcoholic.

Martin Landau, playing here the sadistic bully to the story's protagonist, Al Denton, returned to The Twilight Zone five years later in “The Jeopardy Room”.
