= George F. Johnson =

American businessman (1857–1948)

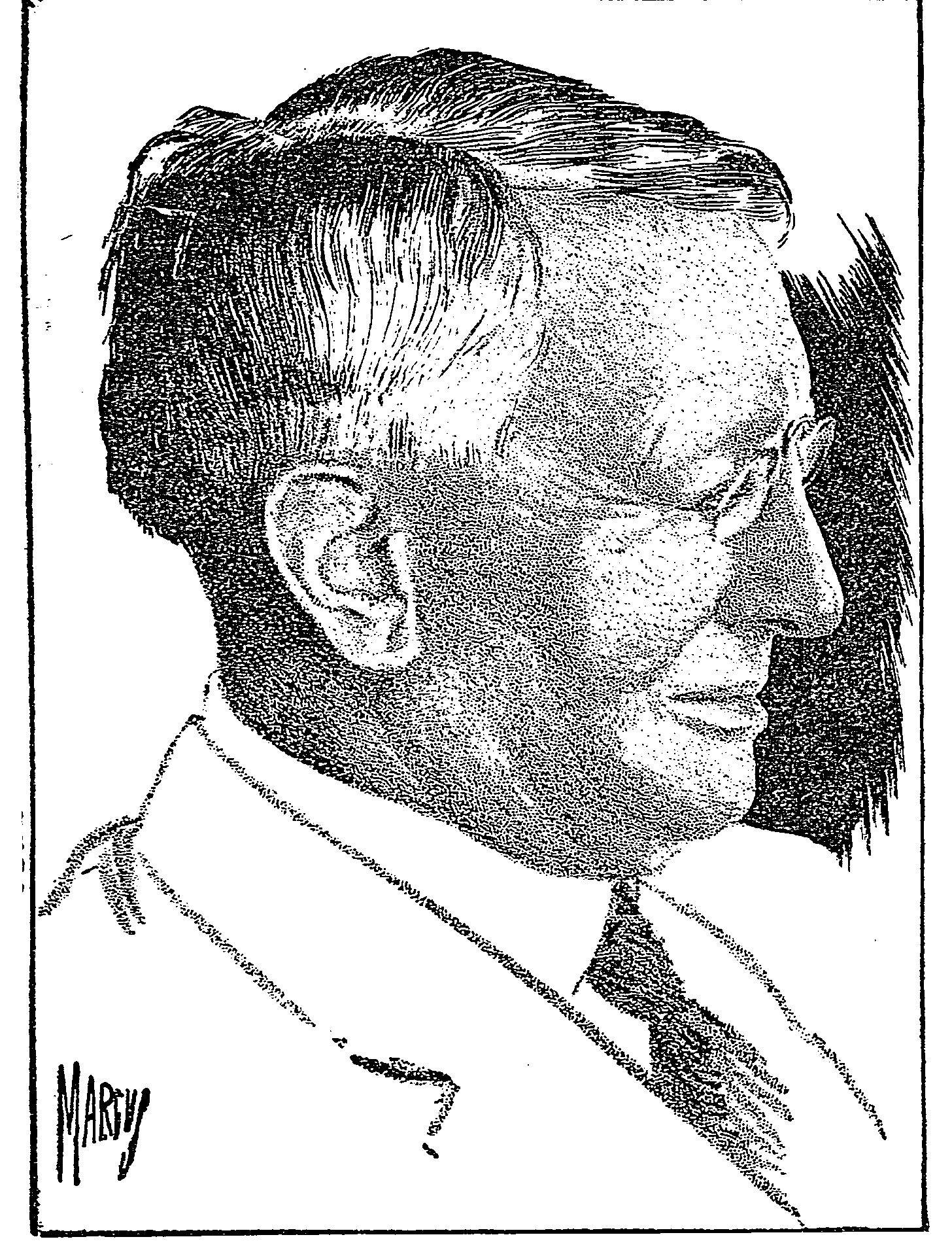
- Born: George Francis Johnson; October 14, 1857; Milford, Massachusetts, U.S.
- Died: November 28, 1948 (aged 91); Endicott, New York, U.S.
- Occupation: Businessman
- Years active: 1881–1948
- Known for: Co-owner of Endicott Johnson Corporation
- Children: 4

George Francis Johnson (October 14, 1857 – November 28, 1948) was an American businessman. He was president of shoe manufacturer Endicott Johnson Corporation and the namesake of Johnson City, New York.

== Biography ==
=== Early life ===
George Francis Johnson was born on October 14, 1857, in Milford, Massachusetts, to Sarah Jane (née Aldrich) and Francis A. Johnson. His father served in the Civil War. His siblings were Oscar E., C. Fred Johnson, Harry L., and Charlotte. Johnson attended public school in Milford. At the age of 13, he left school and worked in a treeing room in a shoe factory in Plymouth. At the age of 21, he became foreman of a treeing room at Emery's shoe factory in Plymouth. In 1882, he moved to Binghamton, New York. He then worked as a foreman of the treeing room and the packing department at Lester Brothers & Company. Nine years later he became superintendent of that company's new plant, which was located in the community of Lestershire, New York, and said to be the largest factory of its kind in the world.

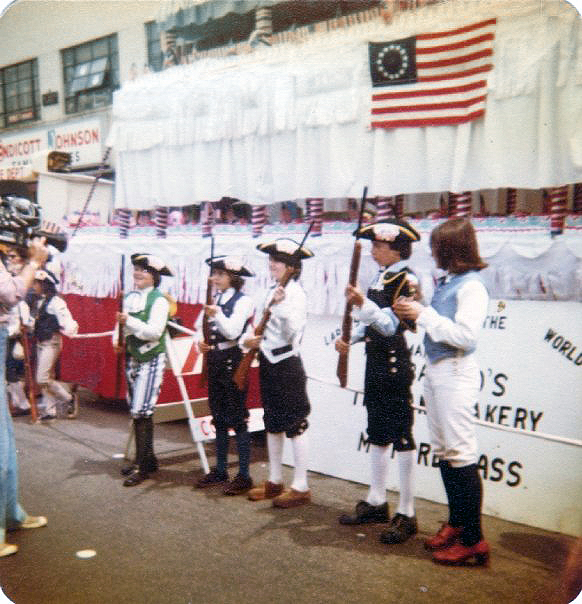
An Endicott-Johnson store in George F. Johnson's hometown of Milford, Massachusetts, can be seen during a U.S. Bicentennial Celebration on May 16, 1976

=== Endicott-Johnson Co. and The Square Deal ===
In 1899, Johnson became co-owner of the business with Henry B. Endicott, which was renamed the Endicott-Johnson Co. Under his presidency, the company grew to eight factories in Broome County, New York, employing about 10,000. Endicott-Johnson was the first company in the shoe industry to introduce the 8-hour workday, 40-hour workweek, and comprehensive medical care. This 40-hour work week was a unit-production based wage rather than an hourly based wage. Despite paying some of the highest wages in the industry, Endicott-Johnson was consistently profitable.

Although Johnson oversaw many different factories throughout the Susquehanna Valley of Broome County, he attracted many immigrant workers to the area by offering to build homes. Although the name Johnson was given to the city in NY where George F. arrived, the city of Endicott better reflects his intimate vision for a prosperous community. This is because Johnson himself developed nearly all of the residential neighborhoods in Endicott, selling houses to the workers at a cost to himself of $1000 each.

In December 1939, Johnson got pneumonia and was forced to retire from the business. Johnson saw to it that Endicott-Johnson employees received a range of benefits that were not typically offered by most employers at the time. The company also created parks (containing swimming pools and carousels that anyone could ride for free), medical facilities, restaurants, libraries, and recreational facilities—all designed to provide high quality goods and services to the employees for free or at a low cost.

The Square Deal Towns of Endicott & Johnson City have set the precedent of eager industrial labor habits for Broome County. The humming EJ factories and neighborhoods were the origins of International Business Machines. Endicott and Johnson City were where George F. Johnson revolutionized the pay system and improved relationships between capital and labor.

Here is a quote from George F.: "To know in the morning that your compensation is fixed; to know that you must do the same thing all day long, to know that whether you do a little more or a little less, whether you are more or less interested and more or less efficient, your pay is automatically fixed-creates the most deadly monotony that I can believe possible". Here he describes what was then called the piece worker system, whereas Professor Melvyn Dubovsky calls Johnson's ethic "welfare capitalism".

The community of Lestershire was renamed Johnson City, New York, in 1916 in honor of Johnson, and Endicott-Johnson workers built two arches over the area's main road in the early ’20s, one at the entrance to Johnson City and the other in Endicott, New York, stating that they were the gateways to the "Square Deal Towns". Endicott-Johnson would become the largest manufacturer of footwear in the United States, employing 24,000 workers at its peak.

=== Working Week ===
During World War I, the Endicott-Johnson shoe factories made every pair of military boots, which equipped U.S. soldiers. On October 16, 1916, George F. Johnson announced the mandate of a 40-hour work week, which became the American Standard. This rule took effect for EJ-factory workers on November 1, 1916. His view of the 40-hour week was based on a wage-system of individual-unit-contributions from his workers, and saw the hourly-wage-system as a form of mental slavery.

== Personal life ==
Johnson had two sons and two daughters, George W., Walter L., Mrs. Zada Robertson and Mrs. Lloyd E. Sweet.

Johnson died on November 28, 1948, at his home at Park Place in Endicott.

== Legacy ==
Recreation Park Binghamton, New York: eighteen acres, purchased by George F. Johnson were given to the City of Binghamton in October 1921 according to http://westsidebinghamton.org/recpark.html quote "to be expended as soon as possible for improvements." The only condition of this gift of property was "that it shall remain forever a public park, and that it shall be properly improved and maintained by the city as such. If at any time this property shall be used for any other purpose, it shall revert to the giver, his heirs or assigns."

"Between 1919 and 1934, George F. Johnson (1857–1948), shoe manufacturer and great benefactor, donated six beautiful carousels to (Broome County's) local parks. Johnson's commitment to recreation was always more than just good business. He felt carousels contributed to a happy life and would help youngsters grow into strong and useful citizens. Because of his own poor childhood, "George F." believed carousels should be enjoyed by everyone and insisted that the municipalities never charge money for a magic ride."

Sarah Jane Johnson Memorial United Methodist Church in Johnson City, New York: "… George F. Johnson offered to donate the cost of a grand, new building if it could be named for his mother, Sarah Jane. …"

George F. Johnson Elementary School, built in 2000, was named after him. It is part of the Union-Endicott Central School District. It is the second Union-Endicott elementary school to be named after him. The first was located in West Endicott.
