= Allan Herschell Company =

Defunct amusement park ride manufacturer

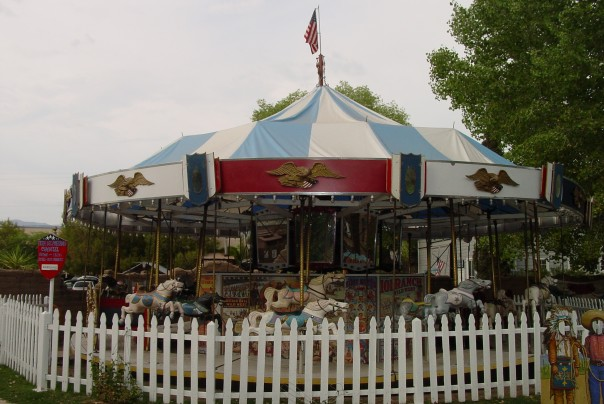
- Type: Private company
- Industry: Amusement ride manufacturing
- Founded: 1915
- Defunct: 1970
- Fate: Merged with Chance Rides
- Area served: Worldwide

The Allan Herschell Company was a company that specialized in the creation of amusement rides, particularly carousels and roller coasters. The company manufactured portable machines that could be used by traveling carnival operators. It was started in 1915 in the city of North Tonawanda, just outside Buffalo, New York, United States.

== History ==
=== Armitage–Herschell Company ===
Scottish immigrant Allan Herschell, with James Armitage, created the Armitage–Herschell Company in 1872. Originally an iron foundry, it branched out into hand-carved wooden carousels in 1883. That same year, Herschell's son William traveled to London to meet former Limonaire Frères employee Eugene de Kleist. Backed by Armitage–Herschell, in 1888, de Kleist set up band-organ production in North Tonawanda, founding the North Tonawanda Barrel Organ Factory. The company produced a range of barrel-organ based products, suited for all ranges of fairground attraction. Armitage–Herschell carved many portable carousels, made in the simple "country fair" style. Surviving steam riding galleries are located in Mississippi and Maine. In 1901, Herschell left the company due to financial complications, thus allowing de Kliest to buy the pair out, and seek new investment from his association with Rudolph Wurlitzer. Armitage–Herschell declared bankruptcy and went out-of-business in 1903.

=== Herschell–Spillman Company (later Spillman Engineering Company) ===
Herschell created the Herschell–Spillman Company in 1901 with his in-laws, the Spillmans. After Armitage–Herschell declared bankruptcy in 1903, Herschell–Spillman bought its assets. Herschell–Spillman started out creating and carving carousels in the basic "country fair" style, but later branched out to larger park machines, such as elaborate carousels with many types of animals. Surviving carousels can be found in California, Michigan, Maryland, and the Herschell–Spillman Noah's Ark Carousel in Portland, Oregon. Herschell–Spillman also constructed engines for the Curtiss Aeroplane and Motor Company and the Daniels Motor Company. The Herschell–Spillman Motor Company Complex at North Tonawanda was listed on the National Register of Historic Places in 2013. Herschell retired from the company due to declining health in 1911.

The company dropped Herschell's name in 1916 and became known as the Spillman Engineering Company. It continued to make the same style of carousels, though later it focused more on horses with a few menagerie-styled machines. Surviving carousels can be seen in North Carolina and the Strong National Museum of Play in Rochester, New York. It went out-of-business in 1945 when it was bought out by the Allan Herschell Company.

=== Allan Herschell Company ===
The Allan Herschell Company, founded in 1915 after Herschell came out of retirement, was the last company he created; it became a competitor for the Spillman Engineering Company. Herschell specialized in horses with rigid poses and portable machines, which enabled them to be packed and shipped easily between towns. Herschell produced over 3,000 carved wooden carousels, which were shipped all over the United States and Canada, as well Mexico, South Africa, and India. Its factory, bought in 1915, is located on Thompson Street in North Tonawanda. It is one of the last factory complexes in the United States to contain the production of wooden carousels. The complex was expanded to meet the growing company's needs. The building has a large carving shop, a woodworking shop, a paint shop, a storage area, an upholstery shop, a machine shop, and a roundhouse where the carousels were assembled and tested. Herschell created other amusement rides besides carousels. He thought up the concept for rides specialized for small children, called "Kiddieland". Twister, Hurricane, Flying Bobs, and the Sky Wheel were thrill rides that catered towards adults. The company moved to Buffalo, New York, in the 1950s, and in 1970, it merged with rival amusement park company Chance Manufacturing of Wichita, Kansas.

== Herschell Carrousel Factory Museum ==
The Herschell Carrousel Factory Museum, at the original factory site on Thompson Street, opened to the general public in July 1983, with a full operational carousel from 1916. The first floor of the factory has been opened up to provide exhibits and demonstrations. Different programs are offered, such as woodcarving of various skill levels, children's story time, guided tours, and a summer lecture series. Special programs, such as the Youth Volunteer Program and Neighborhood Partners Program, are offered to young people and local elementary-school children.

== Surviving Allan Herschell Company rides ==
=== Carousels ===
Year built	Carousel	Location	Notes	Ref.
1900	Bickleton Merry-Go-Round	Cleveland Park, Cleveland, Washington	Originally opened with Oaks Amusement Park, Portland, Oregon in 1905 and relocated to Bickleton in 1929	
1908	Herschell-Spillman Carousel	Gage Park, Topeka, Kansas	Touring carousel. Operated at Boyles Joyland, Topeka, from 1957 until its restoration and relocation to Gage Park in 1989	
1912	Ocean City Handcarved Carousel	Trimpers Rides, Ocean City, Maryland	Listed on National Register of Historic Places Still in full operation	
1913 (c.)	Carousel	Lagoon, Farmington, Utah	Listed on National Register of Historic Places; opened at Lagoon in 1918.	
1913	Noah's Ark Carousel	Oaks Amusement Park, Portland, Oregon	Listed on National Register of Historic Places	
1913	Two-Row Portable Menagerie Carousel	Story City, Iowa	Listed on National Register of Historic Places	
1913	Herschell-Spillman Carousel	The Henry Ford, Dearborn, MI	Original location unknown, operated in Spokane, WA from 1923 to 1961	
1913 (c.)	Chavis Park Antique Carousel	Chavis Park, Raleigh, North Carolina		
1916	#1 Special Carrousel	Herschell Carrousel Factory Museum		
1916 (c.)	3-Abreast Carousel	Dee, Oregon	Formerly at Chase Palm Park, Santa Barbara, California; relocated to Dee, Oregon, (south of Hood River) in 2017. Listed on National Register of Historic Places in 1999.	
1918	Elaine Wilson Carousel	Strong National Museum of Play, Rochester, New York		
1918	"Kiddie Park" Carousel https://www.kiddiepark.com	Brackenridge Park, San Antonio, Texas	operating on May 3, 2026. Signs say, "Herschell Spillman Co. Builders 1918 N. Tonawanda.N.Y." and "...County Fair style carousel designed to be taken apart and shipped by rail to next county fair and reassembled. Placed in San Antonio in 1935..."	
1919	"Little Beauty"	Waterford, Maine	Papoose Pond Family Campground and Cabins	
1920	Highland Park Carousel	Endwell, New York		
1920	Ross Park Carousel	Binghamton, New York		
1920s (c.)	Over-the-Jumps Carousel	Little Rock Zoo, Little Rock, Arkansas		
1920 (c.)	Spillman Engineering 3-Abreast Carousel	Eastridge Mall, San Jose, California	Listed on National Register of Historic Places in 2000.	
1923	Allan Herschell Carousel	Hydro Free Fair Park, Hydro, Oklahoma		
1923	C. Fred Johnson Park Carousel	Johnson City, New York		
1924	Herschell-Spillman Carousel	DelGrosso's Amusement Park, Tipton, PA	Still in current operation	
1925	Cheyenne Mountain Zoo Carousel	Cheyenne Mountain Zoo, Colorado Springs, Colorado		
1925	George F. Johnson Recreation Park Carousel	Binghamton, New York		
1928	Grand Rapids Public Museum	Grand Rapids, Michigan	The Carousel was but in place when the museum was built in 1994.	
1929	West Endicott Park Carousel	Endicott, New York		
1930 (c.)	Antique carousel	Private residence, Sugar Grove, Pennsylvania	Owned by Diane and Louis Enos.	
1930 (c.)	Allan Herschell Carousel	Private residence, Merritt Island, Florida	Originally installed at Coney Island from its construction until 1965. Relocated to Baltimore, Maryland before being used as a traveling carousel.	
1934	George W. Johnson Park Carousel	Endicott, New York		
1947	Allan Herschell Carousel	Harper Motors, Eureka, California	Purchased by dealership in 1991	
1947	Allan Herschell Carousel	Funland (Idaho Falls), Idaho Falls, ID		
1947	Smithsonian Carousel	National Mall, Washington, D.C.		
1947	Carousel of Light	Falmouth, Massachusetts		
1949	Allan Herschell Carousel	Botanica, The Wichita Gardens, Wichita, Kansas		
1949	Carousel	Crandon Park, Key Biscayne, Florida	Was placed into storage in 1972 and later restored.	
1950	Allan Herschell Carousel	Desert Breeze Railroad	still operating	
1950	Scottsdale Charro Carousel	McCormick-Stillman Railroad Park, Scottsdale, Arizona	Formerly owned by Benson's Wild Animal Farm in Hudson, New Hampshire.	
1950 (c.)	Stewart Park Carousel	Stewart Park, Ithaca, New York		
1951	Country Carousel	Scott Township, Pennsylvania	Formerly located at Catskill Game Farm in Catskill, New York from 1951 until 2006. In 2018, Lakeland Orchard & Cidery purchased the carousel.	
1952	Playland Carousel	Huck Finn's Playland, Albany, New York		
1953	The Skyfighters	Located at Funland in Rehoboth Beach, Delaware		
1957	Herschell 3-Row Travelling Carousel	Hyannis, Massachusetts	Located at Wackenhammer's Arcade STEAMuseum on Main Street since 1996	

=== Trains ===
S-24 "Iron Horse" 24" gauge train at Indiana Beach in Monticello, Indiana

- G-12 12 in (305 mm) gauge miniature train
- G-16 16 in (406 mm) gauge miniature train
- S-16 "1865" 16 in (406 mm) gauge miniature train
- S-24 "Iron Horse" 2 ft (610 mm) gauge miniature train

=== Other rides ===
- Caterpillar, at Canobie Lake Park, Salem, New Hampshire, US
- Caterpillar, at Heritage Park Historical Village, Calgary, Alberta, Canada
- Looper, at Knoebels Amusement Resort, Elysburg, Pennsylvania, US
- Red Baron Wild Waves Theme 7 Waterpark

== List of roller coasters ==
As of 2019, Allan Herschell Company has built 185 roller coasters around the world.

Name	Model	Park	Country	Opened	Status	Ref
Little Dipper	Kiddie Coaster / Little Dipper	Frasier's Frontier	United States	Unknown	Closed	
Unknown	Kiddie Coaster / Little Dipper	Deadwood	United States	Unknown	In Storage	
Mite Mouse	Wild Mouse / Mite Mouse	Dispensa's Kiddie Kingdom	United States	Unknown	Removed	
Mite Mouse	Wild Mouse / Mite Mouse	Ocean Beach Park	United States	Unknown	Removed	
Miller's Gold Mine	Wild Mouse / Mite Mouse	Coney Island; Jolly Roger Amusement Park	United States	Unknown; 1987 to 1989	Removed	
Monster Mouse	Wild Mouse / Monster Mouse	Forest Park	United States	Unknown	Removed	
Monster Mouse	Wild Mouse / Monster Mouse	Jack and Jill Amusement Park	United States	Unknown	Removed	
Mad Mouse	Wild Mouse / Mad Mouse	Julia Davis Fun Depot	United States	Unknown	Removed	
Mad Mouse	Wild Mouse / Mad Mouse	Funtown	United States	Unknown	Removed	
Mad Mouse	Wild Mouse / Mad Mouse	Sauzer's Kiddieland	United States	Unknown	Removed	
Mad Mouse	Wild Mouse / Mad Mouse	Fun Town	United States	Unknown	Removed	
Mad Mouse	Wild Mouse / Mad Mouse	Playland Park	United States	Unknown	Removed	
Mad Mouse	Wild Mouse / Mad Mouse	Fair Park	United States	Unknown	Removed	
Little D Formerly Bunny Rabbit; Formerly Roller Coaster	Kiddie Coaster / Little Dipper	Island in Pigeon Forge; Seabreeze Amusement Park; Enchanted Forest Water Safari	United States	Unknown; 1985 to 1996; 1965 to 1970	Removed	
Little Dipper; Formerly Safari Kiddie Coaster; Formerly Kiddie Coaster	Kiddie Coaster / Little Dipper	Bell's Kiddieland; Fun Spot; Adventureland Amusement Park	United States	Never opened 2002 to 2008; Unknown	Removed	
Little Rickies Little Twister	Kiddie Coaster / Little Dipper	Old Indiana Fun-n-Water Park; Six Flags New England	United States	Unknown; 1978 to 1999	Removed	
Kiddie Coaster	Kiddie Coaster / Little Dipper	Stricker's Grove	United States	Unknown	Removed	
Little Dipper	Kiddie Coaster / Little Dipper	Chippewa Lake Park	United States	Unknown	Closed	
L'll Dipper	Kiddie Coaster / Little Dipper	Tinkertown Family Fun Park	Canada	Unknown	Removed	
Unknown	Kiddie Coaster / Little Dipper	Como Town	United States	Unknown	Removed	
Roller Coaster	Kiddie Coaster / Little Dipper	Adventureland	United States	Unknown	Removed	
Little Dipper	Kiddie Coaster / Little Dipper	Funtown	United States	Unknown	Removed	
Roller Coaster	Kiddie Coaster / Little Dipper	Sauzer's Kiddieland	United States	Unknown	Removed	
Little Dipper	Kiddie Coaster / Little Dipper	Kiddieland Amusement Park	United States	Unknown	Removed	
Unknown	Kiddie Coaster / Little Dipper	Fun Town	United States	Unknown	Removed	
Little Dipper	Kiddie Coaster / Little Dipper	Fun Town at Micke Grove	United States	Unknown	Removed	
Kiddie Coaster	Kiddie Coaster / Little Dipper	Wild Waves Theme & Water Park	United States	Unknown	Removed	
Roller Coaster	Kiddie Coaster / Little Dipper	Peony Park	United States	Unknown	Removed	
Little Dipper	Kiddie Coaster / Little Dipper	Bell's Amusement Park	United States	Unknown	Removed	
Unknown	Kiddie Coaster / Little Dipper	Willow Park	United States	Unknown	Removed	
Children's Roller Coaster	Kiddie Coaster / Little Dipper	Holiday World	United States	Unknown	Removed	
Unknown	Kiddie Coaster / Little Dipper	Fire Mountain Amusements	United States	Unknown	Removed	
Unknown	Kiddie Coaster / Little Dipper	Wild West World	United States	Unknown	Removed	
Roller Coaster	Kiddie Coaster / Little Dipper	Playland Park	Canada	Unknown	Removed	
Unknown	Kiddie Coaster / Little Dipper	Excelsior Amusement Park	United States	Unknown	Removed	
Unknown	Kiddie Coaster / Little Dipper	Hamel's Park	United States	Unknown	Removed	
Little Dipper	Kiddie Coaster / Little Dipper	Boblo Island	Canada	Unknown	Removed	
Little Dipper	Kiddie Coaster / Little Dipper	Dealing's Rides	United States	Unknown	Removed	
Little Dipper	Kiddie Coaster / Little Dipper	Lakeview Park	United States	Unknown	Removed	
Comet Jr.	Kiddie Coaster / Little Dipper	Kiddieland Amusement Park	United States	Unknown	Removed	
Little Dipper	Kiddie Coaster / Little Dipper	Plumbers and Steamfitters Local Union 157	United States	Unknown	Removed	
Roller Coaster	Kiddie Coaster / Little Dipper	Dispensa's Kiddie Kingdom	United States	Unknown	Removed	
Roller Coaster	Kiddie Coaster / Little Dipper	Playland	Canada	Unknown	Removed	
Unknown	Unknown	Long Beach Resort	United States	Unknown	Removed	
Roller Coaster	Unknown	Country Fair Entertainment Park	United States	Unknown	Removed	
Little Dipper	Kiddie Coaster / Little Dipper	Enchanted Island	United States	1946	Removed	
Little Dipper	Kiddie Coaster / Little Dipper	Carter Lake Kiddieland	United States	1949	Removed	
Little Dipper	Kiddie Coaster / Little Dipper	Conneaut Lake Park	United States	1950	Closed	
Roller Coaster	Kiddie Coaster / Little Dipper	Kiddie Park Of San Antonio	United States	1950	Removed	
Little Dipper	Kiddie Coaster / Little Dipper	Indiana Beach	United States	1950	Removed	
Little Dipper	Kiddie Coaster / Little Dipper	DandiLion Park	United States	1950	Removed	
Little Dipper	Kiddie Coaster / Little Dipper	DelGrosso's Amusement Park	United States	1950	Removed	
Little Dipper	Kiddie Coaster / Little Dipper	Kiddieland Park	United States	1950	Removed	
Little Dipper	Kiddie Coaster / Little Dipper	Fairgrounds Park	United States	1950	Removed	
Kiddie Koaster	Kiddie Coaster / Little Dipper	Joyland Park	United States	1950	Removed	
Little Dipper	Kiddie Coaster / Little Dipper	Airway Drive-in	United States	1950	Removed	
Little Dipper	Kiddie Coaster / Little Dipper	Uncle Ben's Kiddyland	United States	1950	Removed	
Little Dipper	Kiddie Coaster / Little Dipper	Bel-Air Kiddyland	United States	1951	Removed	
Unknown	Kiddie Coaster / Little Dipper	Katy Road Kiddieland	United States	1951	Removed	
Unknown	Kiddie Coaster / Little Dipper	Pacific Ocean Park	United States	1951	Removed	
Unknown	Kiddie Coaster / Little Dipper	New Liberty Park	United States	1951	Removed	
Little Dipper	Kiddie Coaster / Little Dipper	Playland Park	United States	1951	Removed	
Little Dipper	Kiddie Coaster / Little Dipper	Memphis Kiddie Park	United States	1952	Operating	
Little Dipper	Kiddie Coaster / Little Dipper	Quassy Amusement Park	United States	1952	Operating	
Little Dipper	Kiddie Coaster / Little Dipper	Kiddie Land	United States	1952	Removed	
Little Dipper	Kiddie Coaster / Little Dipper	Joyland Amusement Park	United States	1952	Removed	
Little Dipper	Kiddie Coaster / Little Dipper	Streamland Park	United States	1952	Removed	
Little Fire Ball	Kiddie Coaster / Little Dipper	Kiddie Park	United States	1953	Operating	
Unknown	Kiddie Coaster / Little Dipper	Kiddie Playland	United States	1954	Removed	
Little Dipper	Kiddie Coaster / Little Dipper	Huron Kiddieland	United States	1954	Removed	
Unknown	Kiddie Coaster / Little Dipper	Holiday Hill	United States	1955	Removed	
Roller Coaster	Kiddie Coaster / Little Dipper	Ahern's Playland	United States	1955	Removed	
Little Dipper	Kiddie Coaster / Little Dipper	Midway Park	United States	1956	Operating	
Roller Coaster	Kiddie Coaster / Little Dipper	Seven Peaks Water Park Duneland	United States	1956	Removed	
Little Roller Coaster	Kiddie Coaster / Little Dipper	Lagoon	United States	1956	Removed	
Unknown	Kiddie Coaster / Little Dipper	Suburban Park	United States	1957	Removed	
Unknown	Kiddie Coaster / Little Dipper	Airport Kiddieland	United States	1957	Removed	
Little Dipper	Kiddie Coaster / Little Dipper	Swatara Park	United States	1957	Removed	
Unknown	Kiddie Coaster / Little Dipper	Reynolds Park	United States	1957	Removed	
Bobsled	Kiddie Coaster / Little Dipper	Village	United States	1957	Removed	
Unknown	Kiddie Coaster / Little Dipper	Twin Fiar Kiddieland	United States	1957	Removed	
Unknown	Kiddie Coaster / Little Dipper	Playland Park	United States	1957	Removed	
Little Dipper	Kiddie Coaster / Little Dipper	Playtown Park	United States	1957	Removed	
Wild Mouse	Wild Mouse / Mad Mouse	Riverside Park	United States	1958	Removed	
Unknown	Kiddie Coaster / Little Dipper	Spaceland	United States	1958	Removed	
Little Dipper	Kiddie Coaster / Little Dipper	Doodle-Bug Park	United States	1958	Removed	
Roller Coaster	Kiddie Coaster / Little Dipper	Wedgewood Village Amusement Park	United States	1958	Removed	
Mad Mouse	Wild Mouse / Mad Mouse	Frontier City	United States	1959	Removed	
Mad Mouse	Wild Mouse / Mad Mouse	Queens Park	United States	1959	Removed	
Mad Mouse	Wild Mouse / Mad Mouse	Chain of Rocks Amusement Park	United States	1959	Removed	
Mad Mouse	Wild Mouse / Mad Mouse	Alabama State Fairgrounds	United States	1959	Removed	
Mad Mouse	Wild Mouse / Mad Mouse	Oaks Amusement Park	United States	1959	Removed	
Unknown	Kiddie Coaster / Little Dipper	South Gate Kiddieland	United States	1959	Removed	
Little Dipper	Kiddie Coaster / Little Dipper	Lake Winnepesaukah	United States	1959	Removed	
Mite Mouse	Wild Mouse / Mite Mouse	Smiley's Happyland	United States	1960	Removed	
Mad Mouse	Wild Mouse / Mad Mouse	Como Town	United States	1960	Removed	
Mad Mouse	Wild Mouse / Mad Mouse	Marshall Hall Park	United States	1960	Removed	
Mad Mouse	Wild Mouse / Mad Mouse	Lake Winnepesaukah	United States	1960	Removed	
Roller Coaster	Kiddie Coaster / Little Dipper	Kiddieland Park	United States	1960	Removed	
Unknown	Kiddie Coaster / Little Dipper	Jolly Cholly's Funland	United States	1960	Removed	
Unknown	Kiddie Coaster / Little Dipper	Seaway Kiddieland	United States	1960	Removed	
Unknown	Kiddie Coaster / Little Dipper	Lake George Action Park	United States	1960	Removed	
Unknown	Kiddie Coaster / Little Dipper	Dizzyland	United States	1960	Removed	
Unknown	Kiddie Coaster / Little Dipper	Doling Park	United States	1960	Removed	
Little Dipper	Kiddie Coaster / Little Dipper	Kiddieland	United States	1960	Removed	
Little Dipper	Kiddie Coaster / Little Dipper	Peppermint Park	United States	1960	Removed	
Little Dipper	Kiddie Coaster / Little Dipper	Wonderland Amusement Park	United States	1960	Removed	
Little Dipper	Kiddie Coaster / Little Dipper	Kiddieland	United States	1960	Removed	
Cucaracha; Formerly Sidewinder	Wild Mouse / Mad Mouse	Six Flags Over Texas	United States	1961	Removed	
Swose	Wild Mouse / Mad Mouse	Funtown Pier	United States	1961	Removed	
Unknown	Kiddie Coaster / Little Dipper	Funland Park	United States	1961	Removed	
Unknown	Kiddie Coaster / Little Dipper	Indian Nations Park	United States	1961	Removed	
Unknown	Kiddie Coaster / Little Dipper	Chico Kiddieland	Puerto Rico	1961	Removed	
Astro-ride	Wild Mouse / Mad Mouse	Freedomland U.S.A.	United States	1962	Removed	
Bobsled	Kiddie Coaster / Little Dipper	SkyPark at Santa's Village	United States	1962	Removed	
Flower Power; Formerly Gila Monster	Kiddie Coaster / Little Dipper	Legend City	United States	1963	Removed	
Ratón Loco	Wild Mouse / Monster Mouse	La Feria Chapultepec Mágico	Mexico	1964	Removed	
Mad Mouse	Wild Mouse / Mad Mouse	Cliff's Amusement Park; Magic Mesa Fun Park	United States	1964; Unknown	Removed	
Kiddie Coaster; Formerly Super Coaster	Kiddie Coaster / Little Dipper	Vollmar's Park; Cedar Point	United States	1964; 1952 to 1964	Removed	
Unknown	Kiddie Coaster / Little Dipper	Fantasy Forest at the Flushing Meadows Carousel	United States	1964	Removed	
Monster Mouse	Wild Mouse / Monster Mouse	Playland Park	United States	1965	Removed	
Unknown	Kiddie Coaster / Little Dipper	Kiddieland	United States	1966	Removed	
Little Dipper	Kiddie Coaster / Little Dipper	Saratoga Resort	United States	1966	Removed	
Monster Mouse; Formerly Gila Monster	Wild Mouse / Monster Mouse	Legend City; Pacific Ocean Park	United States	1968; 1964 to 1967	Removed	
Frustratin' Flyer	Wild Mouse / Monster Mouse	Dogpatch USA	United States	1968	Removed	
Little Dipper	Kiddie Coaster / Little Dipper	Lakeview Park	United States	1969	Removed	
Monster Mouse	Wild/Mouse / Monster Mouse	Six Gun Territory	United States	1970	Removed	
Little Dipper	Kiddie Coaster / Little Dipper	Sandy Lake Amusement Park	United States	1971	Removed	
Silly Serpent; Formerly Funicular	Kiddie Coaster / Little Dipper	Worlds of Fun	United States	1973	Removed	
Rockin' Roller; Formerly Acme Gravity Powered Roller Ride; Formerly Rock Candy Express	Kiddie Coaster / Little Dipper	Six Flags St. Louis	United States	1975	Removed	
Mild Thing; Formerly Kiddie Coaster	Kiddie Coaster / Little Dipper	Valleyfair	United States	1976	Removed	
Gulf Coaster	Kiddie Coaster / Little Dipper	Six Flags Great America	United States	1976	Removed	
Gulf Coaster	Kiddie Coaster / Little Dipper	California's Great America	United States	1976	Removed	
Das Kätzchen	Kiddie Coaster / Little Dipper	Busch Gardens Williamsburg	United States	1976	Removed	
Monster Mouse	Wild Mouse / Monster Mouse	Oaks Amusement Park; Playland	United States	1977; Unknown	Removed	
Mini Rock 'N' Roller Coaster	Kiddie Coaster / Little Dipper	Opryland USA	United States	1977	Removed	
Little Dipper	Kiddie Coaster / Little Dipper	Crystal Beach Park	Canada	1977	Removed	
Little Dipper	Kiddie Coaster / Little Dipper	Leonardtown Volunteer Fire Department	United States	1979	Removed	
Monster Mouse	Wild Mouse / Monster Mouse	Rocky Glen Park	United States	1982	Removed	
Mad Mouse; Formerly Monster; Formerly Monster Mouse	Wild Mouse / Monster Mouse	Quassy Amusement Park; Playland Park	United States	1982; 1967 to 1981	Removed	
Wild Mouse	Wild Mouse / Mad Mouse	Bertrand Island Amusement Park	United States	1983	Removed	
Monster Mouse	Wild Mouse / Monster Mouse	Fantasy Farm Amusement Park	United States	1984	Removed	
Roller Coaster; Formerly Jr. Roller Coaster	Kiddie Coaster / Little Dipper	Magic Forest Park; Canobie Lake Park	United States	1985; 1970 to 1984	Removed	
Magic Dragon	Kiddie Coaster / Little Dipper	Lowry Park Zoo	United States	1987	Removed	
Unknown	Kiddie Coaster / Little Dipper	Parque Eme	Mexico	1989	Operating	
Little Dipper	Kiddie Coaster / Little Dipper	Tuscora Park	United States	1990	Operating	
Steel First; Formerly Little Laser; Formerly Snowball Express	Kiddie Coaster / Little Dipper	Dorney Park & Wildwater Kingdom; Santa's Village AZoosment Park	United States	1990; Unknown	Removed	
Unknown	Kiddie Coaster / Little Dipper	Willow Mill Park	United States	1990	Removed	
Wild Kitty	Kiddie Coaster / Little Dipper	Frontier City	United States	1991	Removed	
Unknown	Kiddie Coaster / Little Dipper	Greeley County Fairgrounds	United States	1991	Operating	
Safari	Kiddie Coaster / Little Dipper	Sheridan County Fairgrounds	United States	1991	Operating	
Roller Coaster	Kiddie Coaster / Little Dipper	Wallace County Fairgrounds	United States	1991	Operating	
Mad Mouse	Wild Mouse / Mad Mouse	J's Amusement Park	United States	1991	Removed	
Unknown	Kiddie Coaster / Little Dipper	Funland Park	United States	1991	Removed	
Little Dipper	Kiddie Coaster / Little Dipper	Little Amerricka	United States	1993	Operating	
Mad Mouse	Wild Mouse / Mad Mouse	Little Amerricka; Seven Peaks Water Park Duneland	United States	1993; Unknown	Operating	
Little Leaper	Kiddie Coaster / Little Dipper	Lakemont Park	United States	1993	Removed	
Mad Mouse	Wild Mouse / Mad Mouse	Lakemont Park; White Swan Park	United States	1993; 1965 to 1989	Removed	
Roller Coaster	Kiddie Coaster / Little Dipper	Funland Amusement Park	United States	1993	Removed	
Cornstalk Load Goldmine - Runaway Mine Cars	Kiddie Coaster / Little Dipper	Stage Coach Stop USA	United States	1993	Removed	
Mini Ha Ha	Kiddie Coaster / Little Dipper	Columbian Park	United States	1996	Removed	
Little Dipper	Kiddie Coaster / Little Dipper	Cool World	United States	1997	Removed	
Unknown	Kiddie Coaster / Little Dipper	Deer Forest Fun Park	United States	1998	Removed	
Mad Mouse	Wild Mouse / Mad Mouse	Downunderland	Australia	1999	Removed	
Kiddie Coaster	Kiddie Coaster / Little Dipper	Sherman's Amusement Park	United States	2001	Removed	
Little Dipper	Kiddie Coaster / Little Dipper	Carousel Village at Indian Walk; Dandy's Frontier	United States	2001; Unknown	Removed	
Monster Mouse; Formerly Big Cheese; Formerly Monster Mouse; Formerly Big Mouse; Formerly Mad Mouse	Wild Mouse / Monster Mouse	Tinkertown Family Fun Park; Western Playland	Canada	2003; 1960 to 1998	Removed	
Mine Train	Kiddie Coaster / Little Dipper	Arcadas	Dominican Republic	2003	Removed	
Motor World Express	Kiddie Coaster / Little Dipper	Motor World	United States	2005	Removed	
Swing's Safari Express; Formerly Roller Coaster	Kiddie Coaster / Little Dipper	Shining Waters Family Fun Park; Burlington Amusement Park	Canada	2007; 1960 to 2005	Removed	
Kiddie Coaster; Formerly Junior Roller Coaster	Kiddie Coaster / Little Dipper	Deer Forest Fun Park; Jubilee Park	United States	2007; 1977 to 2004	Removed	
Little Dipper	Kiddie Coaster / Little Dipper	Amusement Park Drive In; Family Funland	United States	2009; 2001 to 2005	Closed	
Monster Mouse	Wild Mouse / Monster Mouse	Amusement Park Drive In; Family Funland	United States	2009; 2001 to 2005	Closed	
Runaway Mine Train; Formerly Run Away Mine Cars; Formerly Chicken Express	Kiddie Coaster / Little Dipper	Holly Springs Farm; Donley's Wild West Town; High Hopes Orchard; Bayville Adventure Park	United States	2024; 2010 to 2019; 2002 to 2005; 2000 to 2001	Operating	
Monster Mouse	Wild Mouse / Monster Mouse	Parque Acuatico Rey Park; Washington State Fair	Ecuador	2011; 1990 to 2010	Closed	
Roller Coaster	Kiddie Coaster / Little Dipper	Blue Mountain Go Karts	Canada	2012	Removed	
Wild Kitty; Formerly Cactus Coaster; Formerly Tombstone Tumbler; Formerly Great Chase; Formerly Wild Kitten	Kiddie Coaster / Little Dipper	Frontier City; Elitch Gardens	United States	2013; 1995 to 2012	Removed	
Range	Kiddie Coaster / Little Dipper	YesterLand Farm	United States	2013	Operating	
Western Train	Kiddie Coaster / Little Dipper	L'ile Aux Enfants	France	2013	Removed	
Roller Coaster	Kiddie Coaster / Little Dipper	Huck Finn's Playland; Hoffman's Playland	United States	2015; 1960 to 2014	Operating	
Lil Dipper Roller Coaster; Formerly Little Dipper	Kiddie Coaster / Little Dipper	Sluggers & Putters; LeSourdsville Lake Amusement Park	United States	2015; Unknown	Operating	
Roller Coaster; Formerly Kiddie Roller Coaster	Kiddie Coaster / Little Dipper	Howard's Apples Farm Market; Dover Lake Waterpark	United States	2016; 1994 to 2005	Operating	
Little Dipper	Kiddie Coaster / Little Dipper	Cedar Valley's Wild Frontier Fun Park; Holland Speedway; Long Point Park, Geneseo, New York on west side of Conesus Lake	United States	2017; 1991 to 2016; 1950 to 1990	Operating	
Wild Mouse; Formerly Mad Mouse	Wild Mouse / Mad Mouse	Arnolds Park; Joyland Amusement Park; Bell's Amusement Park	United States	2019; 1976 to 2018; 1959 to Unknown	Removed	
Barnyard Coaster; Formerly Renegade; Formerly L'il Renegade	Kiddie Coaster / Little Dipper	4D Farm; Southern Adventures; Sertoma Playland	United States	2019; 1999; Unknown	Operating	
Roller Coaster	Kiddie Coaster / Little Dipper	Norton County Fair	United States	2021	Operating	

== Bibliography ==
- Hinds, Anne Dion (1990). Grab the Brass Ring: the American Carousel (1st ed.). Crown Publishers, Inc. ISBN 0-517-57486-1.
