= Herschell Carrousel Factory Museum =

- Allan Herschell Carousel Factory
- U.S. National Register of Historic Places
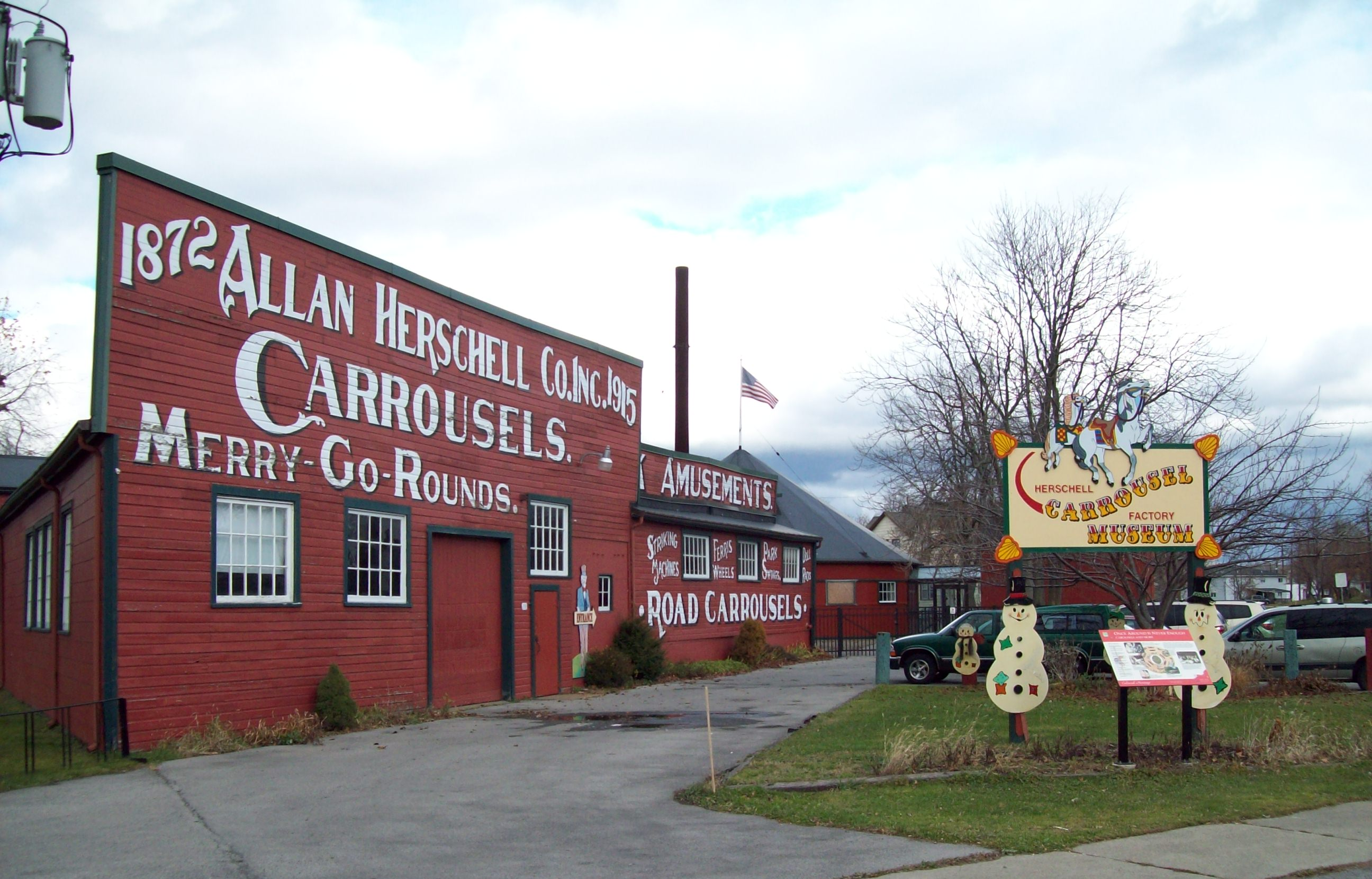
- Herschell Carrousel Factory Museum, November 2008

- Location within New York Location within the United States
- Location: 180 Thompson St., North Tonawanda, New York
- Coordinates: 43°1′46″N 78°52′24″W
- Built: 1910
- NRHP reference No.: 85000856
- Added to NRHP: April 18, 1985

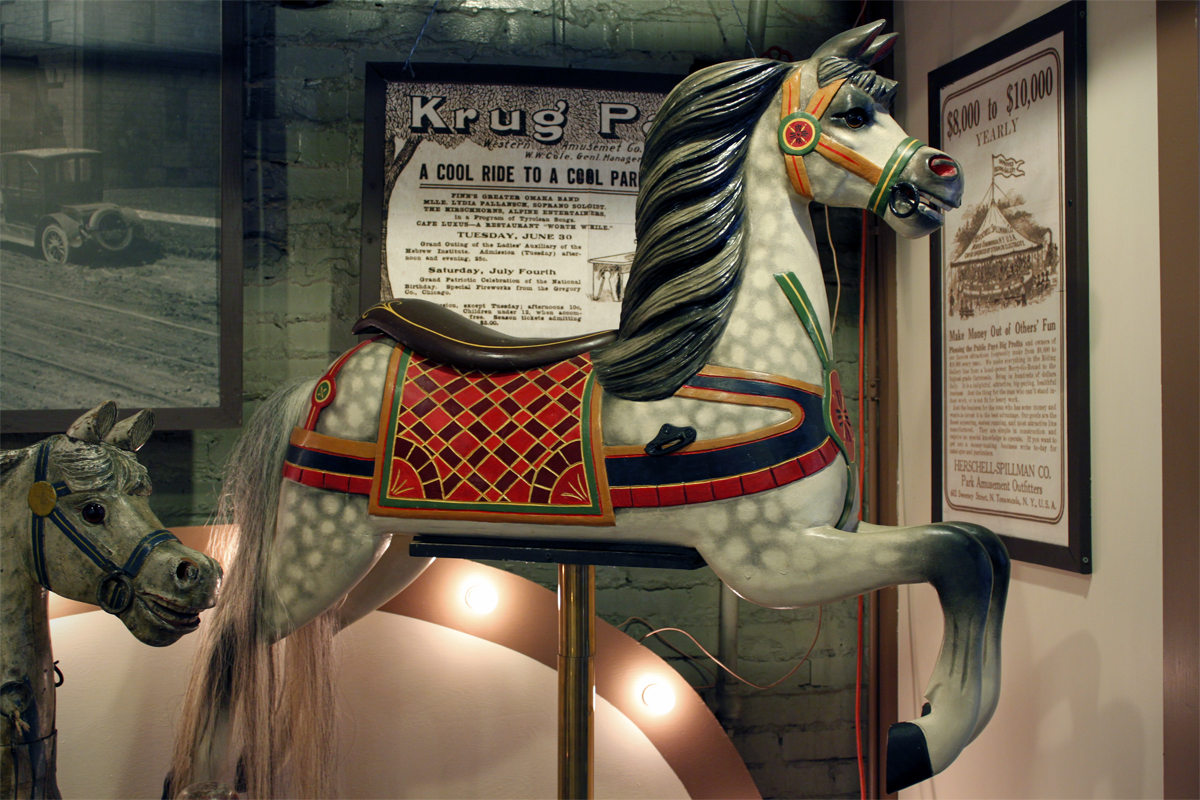
Dark horse-type mount

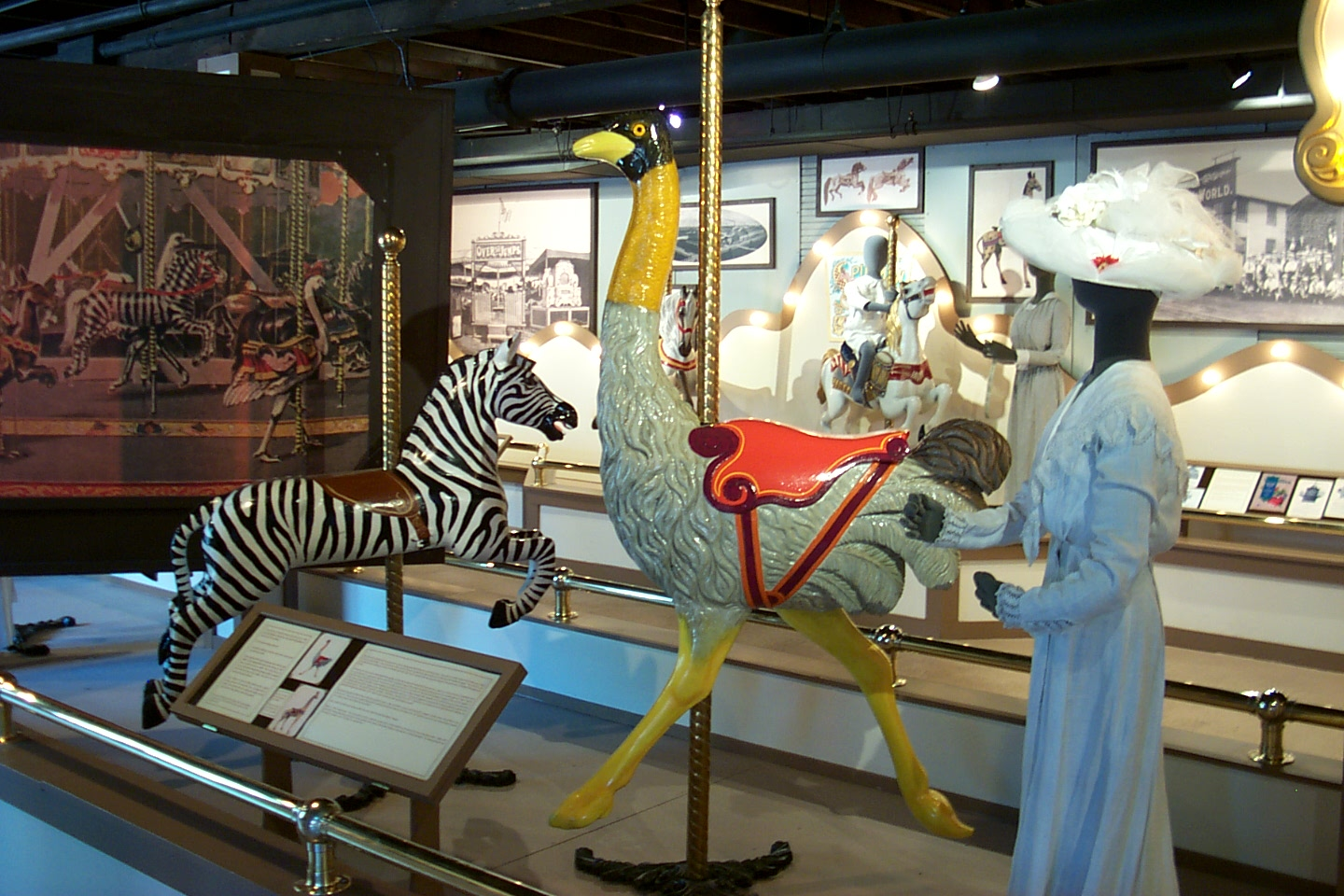
Various Mounts

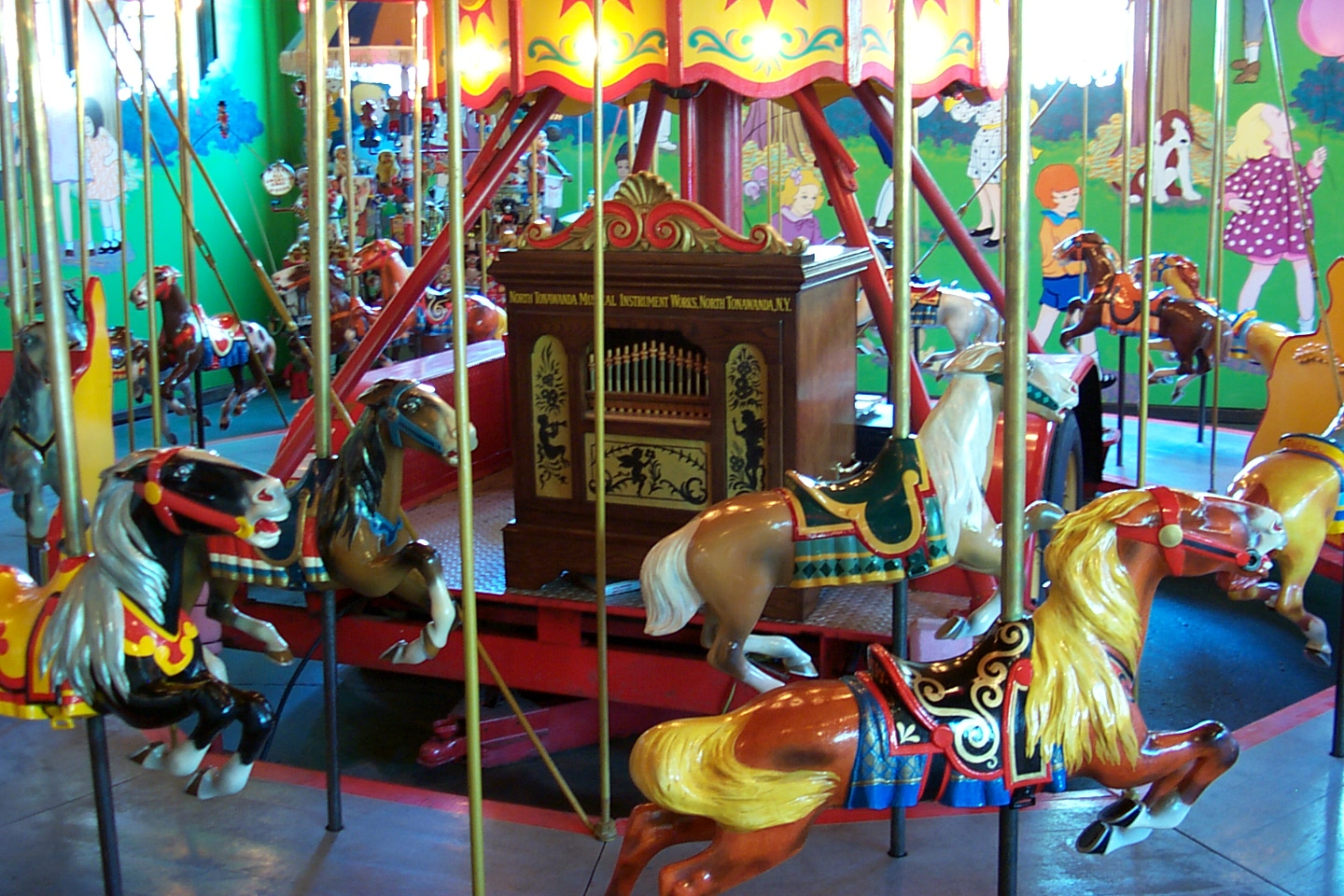
Carousel Organ

Herschell Carousel Factory Museum is a historic carousel factory building located at North Tonawanda in Niagara County, New York. The factory complex was constructed between about 1910 and 1915 and consists of six primary structures and five contributory additions. The primary structures are: the Mill Building (ca. 1910), Carving and Pattern shop (ca. 1910), Paint Shop and Storage Building (ca. 1915), Roundhouse (ca. 1915), Machine Shop (1915), and Assembly and Testing Building (1915). Also on the property is the Special Number One Three Abreast portable carousel, built in 1916.

At one time four carousel builders operated in North Tonawanda. The Allan Herschell Company, and its predecessor the Herschell-Spillman Company, was the most notable of them and operated from 1876 to 1959. The company produced wooden carousels into the 1930s. The Allan Herschell Company also built other amusement devices. Kiddielands were specialized parks for children, which included rides such as Kiddie boats and helicopters. Starting in the 1930', the company began building adult rides, such as the "Twister," the "Hurricane" and the "Sky Wheel," a double Ferris wheel nearly 90 feet tall.

It was listed on the National Register of Historic Places in 1985 as the Allan Herschell Carousel Factory. Nearby is located the Herschell–Spillman Motor Company Complex, listed on the National Register of Historic Places in 2013.

The museum occupies the original Herschell factory site on Thompson Street. It was first open to the general public in 1984, with a full operational carousel from 1916. Renovations included reconstruction of the original roundhouse and roof repairs. Other projects included restoring the original office building into an Education Center, and developing the Kiddieland Testing Park.

The first floor of the factory has been opened up to provide exhibits and demonstrations. These areas are split into: The Carving Floor; The Wurlitzer Music Department; The Paint Shop; The Jeanette E. Jones Children's Gallery; The Roundhouse; and The Loading Dock. Two operating carousels give visitors first hand experience of the magical ride and authentic band organ music. The Jeanette E. Jones Children's Gallery presents interactive learning activities, and is available for rentals. Different programs are offered, such as woodcarving of various skill levels, guided tours, and a summer lecture series.

The Wurlitzer Music Department is home to over 10 historic band organs and features the only functioning Wurlitzer Perforator still in existence. The museum still operates this equipment and produces band organ rolls from Wurlitzer's rolls list.

The museum also has an award winning education department, including winning the 2016 Hodgson Russ Excellence in Collaboration Award. The museum currently offers virtual and in-person educational programs for schools, after school programs, and youth organizations. The offerings vary in subject, from lessons on the history of the Erie Canal to physics on the Carousel.

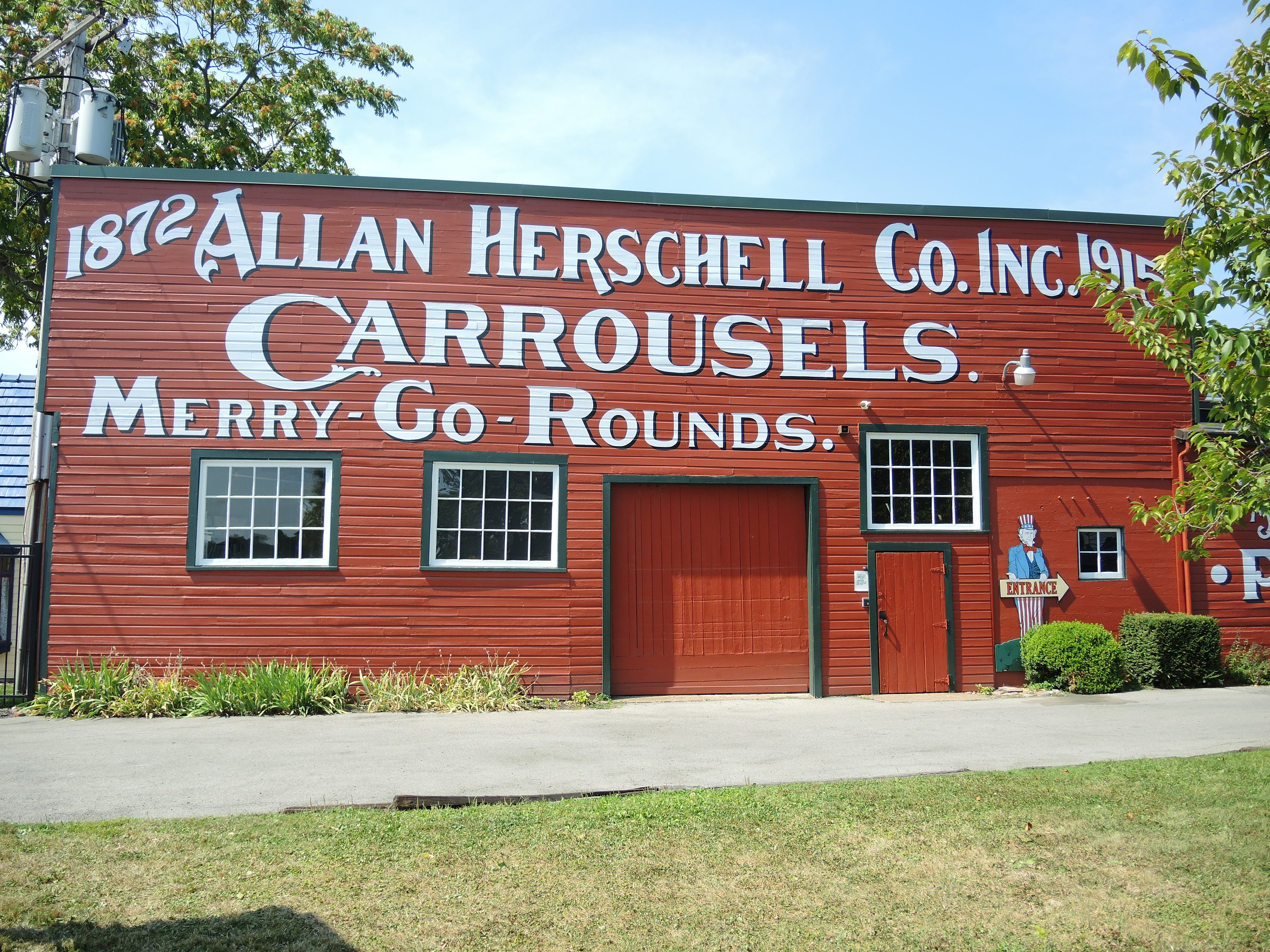
Paint shop and storage

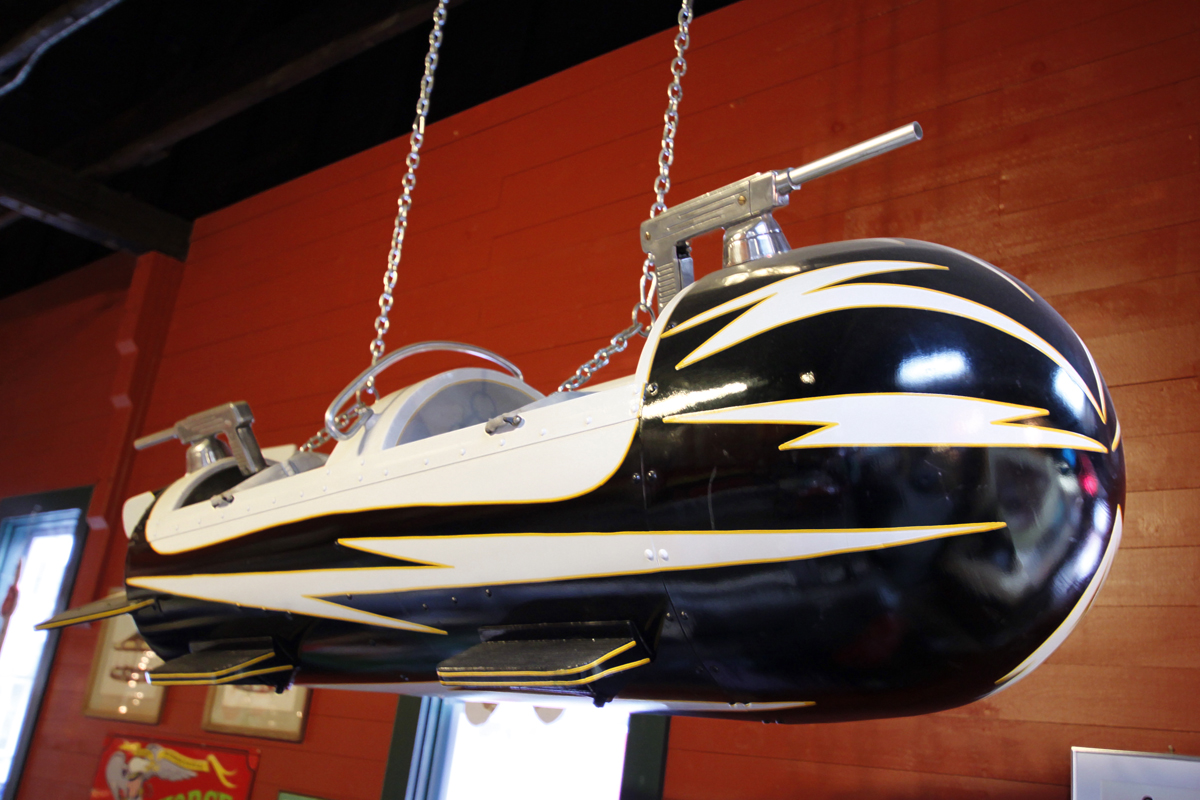
Retro Skyfighter kiddie ride

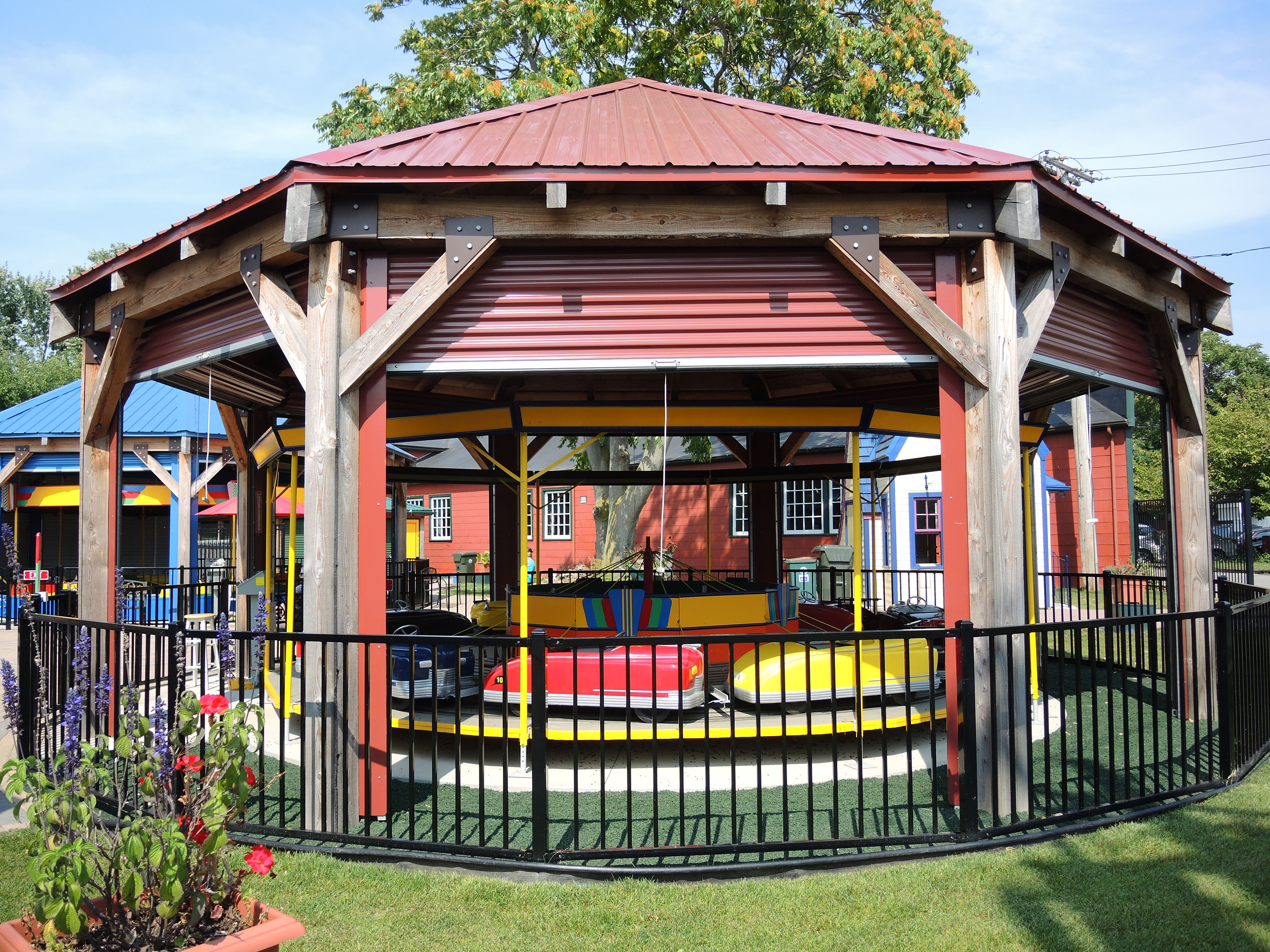
Retro automobile kiddie ride

== See also ==
- C.W. Parker Carousel Museum, Leavenworth, Kansas
- Herschell–Spillman Noah's Ark Carousel, Portland, Oregon
- Over-the-Jumps Carousel, Little Rock, Arkansas
