= Little Amerricka =

Amusement park in Marshall, Wisconsin

- Previously known as Little A-Merrick-A (1991–2006)

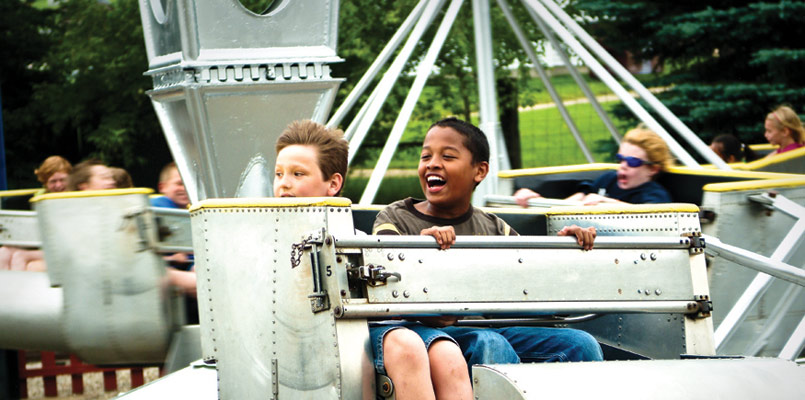
- Scrambler ride in 2011
- Interactive map of Little Amerricka
- Location: Marshall, Wisconsin, United States
- Coordinates: 43°9′53″N 89°3′30″W
- Status: Operating
- Opened: 1991
- Owner: Lee Merrick (1991–2011)
- General manager: Darrell Klompmaker
- Slogan: "Fun for all!"
- Operating season: May through September
- Area: 10 acres (4.0 ha)

Attractions
- Total: 24
- Roller coasters: 4
- Website: Official website

Little Amerricka is an amusement park located in Marshall, Wisconsin. It opened in 1991 and features several attractions, including a twice-relocated wooden roller coaster called Meteor, a 16 in (406 mm) gauge miniature train called Whiskey River Railway, and an 18-hole miniature golf course.

== History ==
In 1987, a minimum-gauge railway was constructed by now-park owner Lee Merrick as a hobby. Guests utilized it as transportation to Merrick's Christmas tree farm. It was popular enough that Merrick purchased the land the park now sits on and built a concession stand. By this point, he had begun to collect and refurbish vintage children's rides. In 1989, he was planning on creating an amusement park when he met his now-business partner Darrell Klompmaker. The two opened the park in 1991 as Little A-Merrick-A, featuring miniature golf, the miniature train, bumper cars, a Ferris wheel, a Tilt-A-Whirl, and a fire truck ride. In 1993, the park added three roller coasters: Little Dipper, Mad Mouse, and Toboggan. It was the only amusement park in Wisconsin with permanent roller coasters until 1995, when Mt. Olympus Water & Theme Park opened Cyclops. In 2003, the park purchased a wooden roller coaster, Meteor. Meteor became the first wooden coaster to be relocated more than once, having first operated at Kiddytown in Norridge, Illinois from 1953 to 1966, and at Hillcrest Park in Lemont, Illinois from 1967 to 2003. 75% of the wood had to be replaced during the ride's move from Hillcrest Park to Little A-Merrick-A. The ride did not open to the public until 2007. The park's name was shortened to Little Amerricka in 2007 as well. Park founder and owner Lee Merrick died in 2011.

== Attractions ==
=== Roller coasters ===
Ride	Year opened	Manufacturer	Description	Source
Little Dipper	1993	Allan Herschell Company	A steel children's roller coaster that was purchased from a private party in Missouri. It arrived to Little Amerricka in poor condition and the park refurbished it.	
Mad Mouse	1993	Allan Herschell Company	A steel wild mouse roller coaster. The ride was manufactured in 1960. Mad Mouse was relocated from Seven Peaks Water Park Duneland (known then as Enchanted Forest) in Chesterton, Indiana.	
Swiss Toboggan	1993	Chance Rides	A steel Toboggan roller coaster. Swiss Toboggan was the first of two Toboggan coasters Chance Rides built without a trailer, having been manufactured in 1969. It originally operated at Dogpatch USA in Marble Falls, Arkansas from 1969 to 1988, where it was known as Earthquake McGoon's Brain Rattler. It was then moved to Seven Peaks Water Park Duneland, where it operated as Toboggan from an unknown date to 1990.	
Meteor	August 8, 2007	Philadelphia Toboggan Coasters	A Herbert Schmeck-designed wooden roller coaster that originally opened in 1953 at Kiddytown in Illinois, where it was known as Little Dipper. It was moved in 1966 to Hillcrest Park, also in Illinois, where it operated until 2003. It was purchased in 2003 and reconstructed at Little Amerricka. Darrell Klompmaker supervised the move.	

=== Rides ===
Name	Year opened	Manufacturer	Type
Ferris Wheel	1991	Eli Bridge Company	Ferris wheel
Hampton Combo Cars	1991	Hampton Amusement Company	Small spinning children's car ride
Haunted House	1991	Built in-house	Walkthrough haunted house
Helicopter Adventure	1991	Allan Herschell Company	Small spinning children's helicopter ride
Kiddie Boats	1991	Allan Herschell Company	Small spinning children's boat ride
Kiddie Wheel	1991	Allan Herschell Company	Children's Ferris wheel
Merry-Go-Round	1991	Chance Rides	Carousel
Moon Walk	1991	Unknown	Bounce house
Red Baron	1991	Allan Herschell Company	Small spinning children's plane ride
Scrambler	1991	Eli Bridge Company	Scrambler
Test Pilot	1991	Eyerly Aircraft Company	Roll-O-Plane
Tilt-A-Whirl	1991	Sellner Manufacturing	Tilt-A-Whirl
Whiskey River Railway	1991	Crown Metal Products	Miniature train
Monorail	1994	Zamperla	Monorail
Fire Truck Rescue	1995	Zamperla	Small spinning children's fire truck ride
Bumper Boats	1998	Arrow Dynamics	Bumper boats
Bumper Cars	1998	Bertazzon	Bumper cars
Parachute Tower	1999	Zamperla	Parachute tower
Go Karts	2003	J&J Amusements	Go-karts
Tiger Slide	Unknown	Unknown	Inflated slide

=== Other attractions ===
Name	Year opened	Manufacturer	Type
18-Hole Miniature Golf	1991	Built in-house	Miniature golf
Playground	1991	Unknown	Playground
