= Kiddie ride =

Type of amusement ride

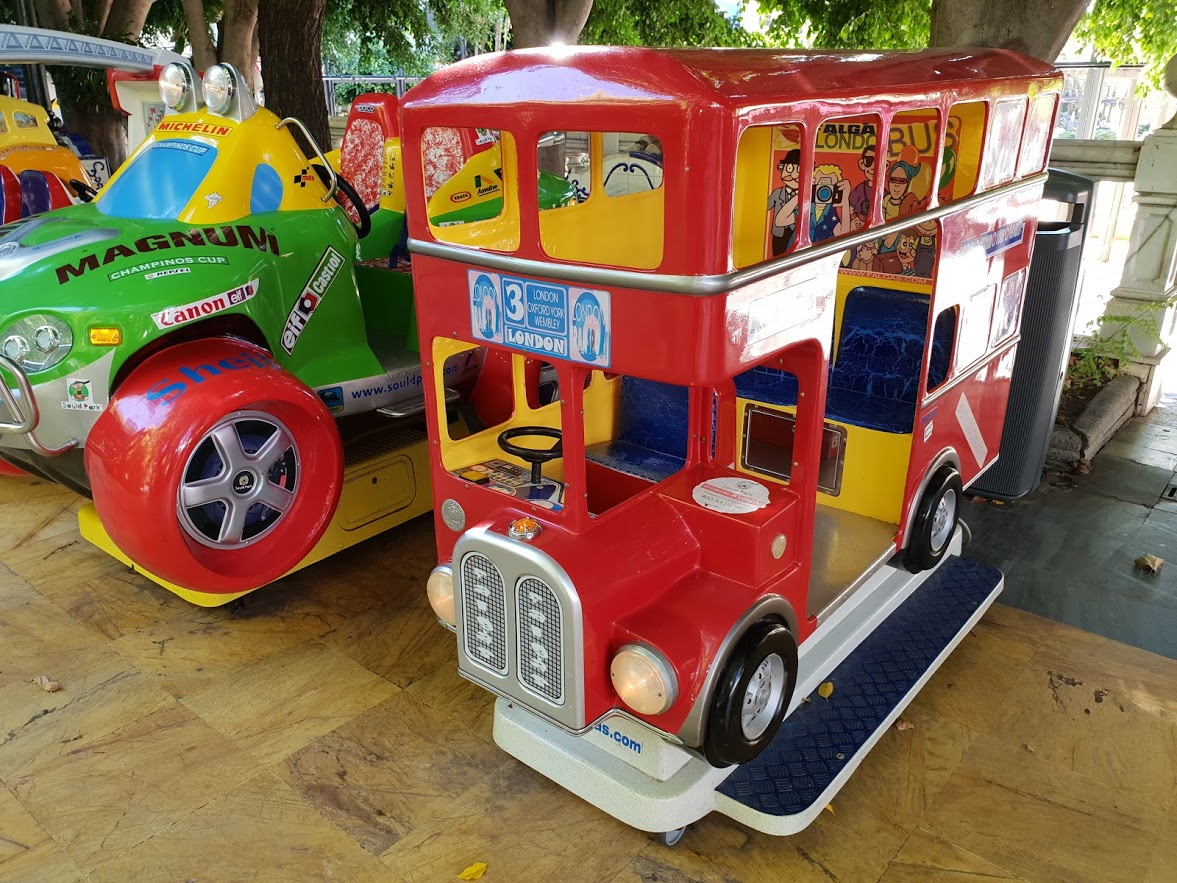
A bus kiddie ride in Marbella

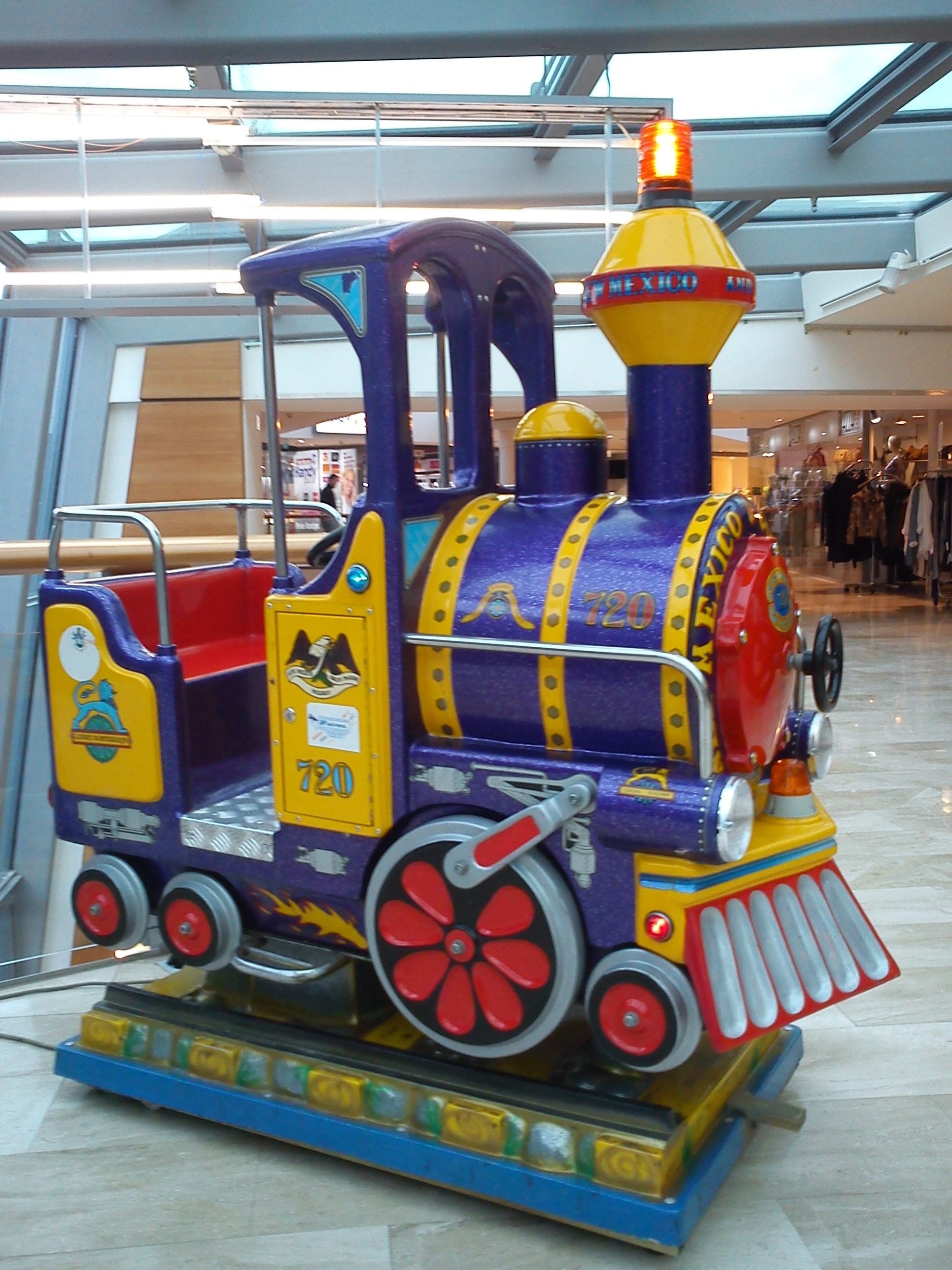
A train kiddie ride

A kiddie ride is a child-sized, themed, mildly interactive coin-operated ride that can be ridden by young children for amusement. Kiddie rides are commonly available in amusement parks, arcades, malls, hotel game rooms, outside supermarkets, and large department stores. Less commonly, they may also appear in other venues such as restaurants, food courts, grocery shops, and auto dealerships. When activated by a coin, a kiddie ride entertains the rider for a short time with a mild motion that replicates the theme of the ride. Most rides also include sounds and music. Some even feature flashing lights, pedals, and/or buttons. Commercial kiddie rides are often colorful with an animal, vehicle, or popular cartoon character theme, which appeals to young children. They are usually driven by a heavy-duty electric motor, which is usually disguised inside or underneath the metal, fiberglass, or vacuum formed plastic body of the ride.

== History ==
The kiddie ride was first invented in 1930 by James Otto Hahs (1891–1969) of Sikeston, Missouri. Originally called the Hahs Gaited Mechanical Horse, the ride was originally conceived as a Christmas present for his children. However, Hahs soon set about commercializing it. Initially, he used wooden horses, and commissioned carousel makers to make the horses. However, he found these horses to be too heavy and decided that aluminum would be a more suitable material. When told it couldn't be done, however, Hahs went ahead and invented a process to form horses out of metal. The rides would be manufactured at Hahs Machine Works in Sikeston, and they were recognized as the most original invention of the year in 1932. In 1933, Hahs struck a deal with Exhibit Supply Company to distribute his horses, with a 5% cut going to Hahs. When the patent on the ride eventually ran out, he retired from the wealth he had amassed from sales. In 1953, Billboard magazine called it "1953's fastest growing business". Years later, aluminum horses would be replaced by fiberglass.

Developed around the same time, the Link Trainer was initially intended for use as a coin-operated entertainment device as well as a tool for training pilots.

== Types of rides ==
=== Track rides ===
Track rides are usually rides in the form of a train on a track; in most coin-operated train-type track rides, the coin mechanism is on the locomotive unit of the ride and it can seat two to three toddlers. In general, the ride is powered by a low-voltage current passing through the tracks, but sometimes the ride is powered by batteries. Most versions of these rides are specifically designed to carry young children due to the low-voltage used and the size of the ride, although it is possible to find bigger models designed for older children.

Track rides are not necessarily restricted to train-form; animal track rides on the theme of horses or frogs have also been documented. In a similar fashion, another type of ride that would be classified as a track ride would be one with an elongated base where the figure paces the length of the base, then turns and moves in the opposite direction on reaching its limit.

=== Carousel rides ===
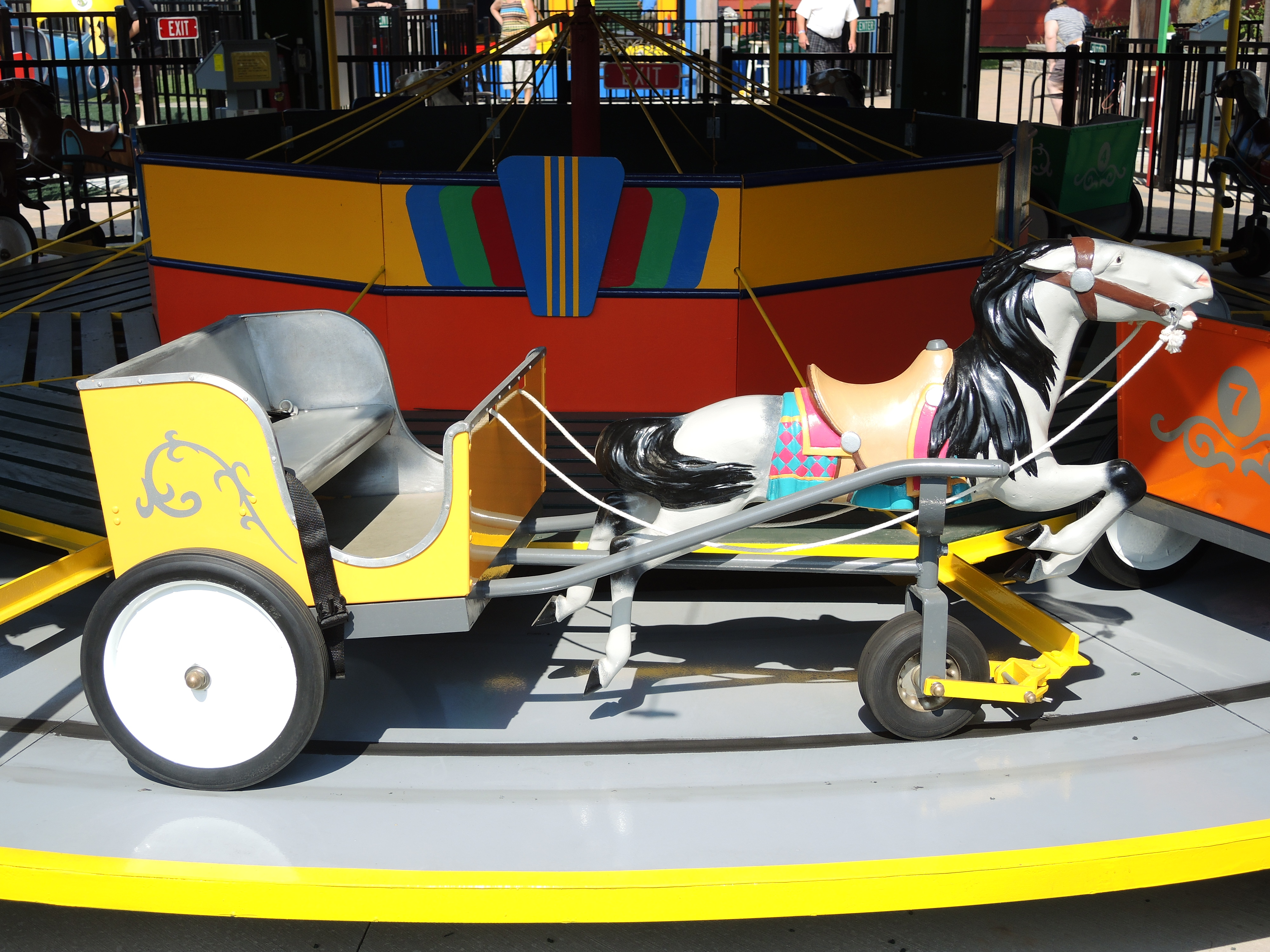
Harness racing kiddie ride at the Herschell Carrousel Factory Museum

Another common type of kiddie ride is the miniature carousel. These rides are usually in the form of a small-sized carousel. The newer models have the coin box on the main pillar, whereas older units have the coin box on a pole sticking out of the side of the ride.

Carousel rides featuring licensed characters do exist. A Thomas the Tank Engine carousel ride is known to exist, as is one from a British television show for children called Play School. Carousel rides featuring the characters from The Wiggles, Bob the Builder, Sesame Street and Hi-5 have also been documented.

=== Hydraulic rides ===
More commonly built by European kiddie ride manufacturers like Automatic Toys Modena (ATM) from Italy, hydraulic rides are kiddie rides situated on a hydraulic arm that raises and lowers the ride during their activation. Usually, the rider is given limited interaction with the ride in the form of up/down buttons or levers so that the rider can instruct the ride to fly higher or lower, giving the user the impression of some control over their experience.

=== Base rides ===
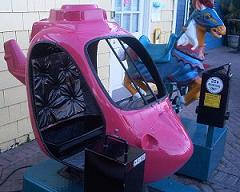
A helicopter ride

This kind of ride is perhaps the most common type: an animal or vehicle situated on a vacuum-formed base that moves up-and-down, side-to-side, or both, when activated; some move in a slithering-like motion. Usually, rides of this configuration have the motor hidden in the base, although some larger rides have the motor hidden in the ride-on figure instead.

One of the most popular rides is a horse ride. Recent developments have included the "Pony Express" ride, first manufactured by Italian company Cogan. These feature a complicated mechanism that alternates between galloping and trotting motions during the ride, mimicking the movements of a real-life horse. This type has been adapted by both the Spanish manufacturer Falgas for their own version of the "Pony Express" and Memo Park, another Italian-based company, for their own type of Western-style horse; Falgas adds horse sounds to the soundtrack whilst on the Memo Park version is the use of rider interactivity, in where if the rider pulls back on the reins, the horse stops for a few seconds before continuing to either gallop or trot, depending on what pace it is travelling at when the reins are pulled.

Another one of the most popular rides is the Kiddie Coaster. The first edition was manufactured by Amutec and released in 2000. Another edition was manufactured by Innovative Concepts in Entertainment and released in 2002. This ride simulates one of two different roller coasters. The Innovative Concepts in Entertainment edition simulates Blue Streak and Gemini while the Amutec edition simulates two different Six Flags coasters.

=== Free movement (bumper car-like) rides ===
These kinds of rides are usually in the form of animals or vehicles. These are most common in Asian countries, particularly China. Unlike a real bumper car ride commonly found at funfairs, the coin-operated variant uses batteries instead of drawing electricity off of an overhead mesh, and one can ride it anytime instead of having to wait for the operator to start the ride for them.

=== Teeter-totter rides ===
These rides are generally teeter-totters for one person. An inanimate figure typically sits at the opposite end of the ride. The ride moves in a gentle up-and-down motion, mimicking that of a standard teeter-totter. Jolly Roger Amusement Rides has made three of these: one featuring Mr. Bump from The Mr. Men Show, one featuring the Pink Panther and one featuring Mr. Blobby.

=== Video game hybrids ===
These rides are a hybrid of kiddie rides and arcade video games. The rides usually incorporate a video display, and while the motion is synchronized to the events happening on the screen, the ride will start and end following the events on the screen. The ride is usually interactive and there are push-buttons to allow the rider to interact with the on-screen actions.

These rides should not be mistaken for simulators, which reproduce the action of a video game without offering further interactivity. Furthermore, the video-game hybrid is time-based and ends at a predetermined time, regardless of the actions of the user. An example of a hybrid ride would be the Waku Waku Sonic Patrol Car ride and other waku-waku and wanpaku series of rides manufactured by Sega.

== Character rides ==
In many cases, kiddie rides in the likes of well-known copyrighted characters or objects from films or television shows can also be found, usually at bigger shopping malls that can afford them due to the higher purchasing costs. A classic example would be the Batmobile rides.

=== Jolly Roger Amusement Rides ===
In 1994, R.G. Mitchell released a Thomas the Tank Engine kiddie ride with 4 push buttons which trigger "You're a really useful engine!" (Thomas: blue), "I need you to help the other engines" (Sir Topham Hatt: yellow), a whistle sound (James: red) and a steam sound (Percy: green). There is also a mini version of the aforementioned ride for places that don't have enough space. In 2006, Jolly Roger Amusement Rides of the United Kingdom released their version of the Thomas the Tank Engine kiddie ride in two options, standard and video. Jolly Roger Amusement Rides is also known for making other licensed kiddie rides, including a fire truck and an airplane featuring Woody Woodpecker and Chilly Willy, a seesaw, train and police van featuring the Pink Panther and Inspector Clouseau, and a sailboat featuring Popeye. Another example of a character kiddie ride would be a Clifford the Big Red Dog kiddie ride, manufactured by Jolly Roger Amusement Rides of the United Kingdom. This ride costs around $5000 in the United States when purchased new. It plays the theme song from the PBS Kids TV series when in motion. The push button on the ride triggers Clifford barking sounds. Another example would be a Bob the Builder ride, which features Bob climbing onto Scoop with 4 sounds and Pilchard in his shovel. This ride was also manufactured by Jolly Roger Amusement Rides and released around January 2000.

Another example would be a Superman kiddie ride featuring the Man of Steel "stopping" the train you're in (meant to look like it's emerging from a tunnel into a rockfall). When in motion, it plays the Superman: The Animated Series theme (in a lower pitch, the PAL version) and has four buttons: "Look! Up in the sky! It's a bird... it's a plane... it's Superman!!" "Superman! Faster than a speeding bullet!" "Superman! More powerful than a locomotive!" and "Superman! Able to leap tall buildings in a single bound!" (these are all taken from the Superman radio show, but voiced by Don Kennedy). Like some of the above examples, it was manufactured by Jolly Roger Amusement Rides. This ride was released in January 2000, although it was copyrighted in 1999.

=== Others ===
Kiddie's Manufacturing made three kiddie rides based on The Flintstones: the Flintmobile, Dino and Loggin Continental. All three play "Meet The Flintstones" when the ride is in motion, and were released in 1994.

In 2015, Northern Leisure released a SpongeBob SquarePants kiddie ride based on the Krabby Patty Wagon from The SpongeBob SquarePants Movie. This ride has SpongeBob seated next to the "rider's seat", and his pet snail Gary rides on the back of the ride. This SpongeBob-themed ride also includes a screen displaying the lyrics to the SpongeBob SquarePants theme song. The lyrics to the theme song have to be sung out by whoever rides it (known as sing-along). The attract mode is also the SpongeBob theme song, and each of the 3 buttons on the ride plays a sound effect: a horn, bubble noises (commonly used in transitions from a scene to another in SpongeBob), and a dolphin noise.

Knockoff rides that feature figures that look like those of famous cartoon characters exist. They are cheaper than real licensed rides and are found at smaller establishments. They are not licensed, and in certain areas with high intellectual property rights recognition, purchasers of knockoff rides can get themselves entangled in legal complications. The ride figure might not be designed to look as close to a licensed character compared to genuinely licensed rides, possibly resulting in diminished recognition. Occasionally, there are some countries where knockoff characters are found on fairground rides. These feature paint jobs of popular characters that are featured on the rides without a license from their respective owners.

== Personal uses ==
While kiddie rides are primarily used to garner extra income for commercial areas like shopping malls, supermarkets and amusement centers, they are also common in homes in many developed countries. This is being led by Denver-based Kiddie Rides USA and has received coverage in many magazines, including Time, Fortune, United Airlines' Hemispheres, and CNBC. Many of the rides are ex-location units which have been written off by the original owner, usually to make way for newer games or rides, and bought for a fraction of what they would cost brand new, either directly from the previous owner or on online auction sites like eBay.

== In popular culture ==
- In the Netflix original series Stranger Things, a horseback riding kiddie ride at the fictional Starcourt Mall proves vital to the discovery of an underground Soviet base beneath the shopping mall.
- In the SpongeBob SquarePants "My Pretty Seahorse" episode, Scooter mistakes the seahorse Mystery outside the Krusty Krab for a kiddie ride and tries to put a coin in her, at which point he is bucked across the parking lot. In the episode "Sleepy Time" from the first season, SpongeBob visits the dreams of his friends. Patrick's dream is completely empty, except for a kiddy ride that he is riding on.
- In Lilo & Stitch, Stitch mistakes a rocket ship themed kiddie ride for an actual rocket ship and is disappointed it does not let him leave Earth.
- In Pee-wee's Playhouse, there are two kiddie rides introduced in season 2. The first one is Bally's Ride The Champion Kiddie ride from 1952 (as seen in the season 2–5 intros where Pee-wee Herman is seen wearing boots and riding it and in the season 5 episode "Something To Do" where Miss Yvonne rides it), and the second one is also made by Bally in 1952 called "Ride The Space Ship" which is modified with orange fibreglass material and a green 71 number on it. (As seen in the episode "School" where Rapunzel is riding it while Pee-wee and the Playhouse Gang are screaming and Pee-wee screams "Ahhhh!!! Meteor storm!")
