= Dispensa's Kiddie Kingdom and Castle of Toys =

Amusement park in Illinois, United States

Dispensa’s Kiddie Kingdom and Castle of Toys was a 5-acre amusement park and toy store located on a 12.5-acre site in Oakbrook Terrace, Illinois near the Oakbrook Center shopping center, in DuPage County, Illinois. The store was in business from 1967 to 1985. The amusement park operated from 1975 to 1984.

The Castle of Toys store was the largest independent, free-standing toy store in the world. The store received a fair amount of attention due to its unique shape as a turreted castle which featured oversized toy soldiers lining the edifice.

It advertised rides for a quarter per ride or six rides for a dollar, a price that later became five for a dollar according to their TV jingle.

== Rides ==
Kiddie Kingdom featured 22 rides which included the following:

- Scrambler
- Tilt-A-Whirl
- Sky Fighter
- Mite Mouse
- Antique Autos
- Youngster's Yachts
- C.P. Huntington 1863
- Merry-Go-Round

== History ==
The Dispensa family business began in 1919 when Nicholas "Nick" S. Dispensa, an Italian immigrant to the U.S., purchased a Ferris wheel for $1500. The business evolved into Dispensa & Sons Complete Carnivals. In 1924, Nick's son John left school at the age of 12 to work with his father on the carnival. In 1951, Dispensa purchased the original 25-acre site for $1000 per acre. Half the land was taken by the state to construct the interchange of Illinois Route 83 and Roosevelt Road.

== Advertising ==
Both the store and the park were heavily advertised through television commercials. It was a staple of Chicago television advertising, particularly during the Christmas season.

Its jingle featured a woman singing this song, with a child's voice interposing spoken comments:

Dispensa's Castle of Toys

(It's a castle!)

Dispensa's Castle of Toys

(It's a toy store!)

Dispensa's Castle of Toys

(It's toy-mendous!)

Come to Dispensa's Castle of Toys
Oakbrook Terrace, Illinois

Despite the visual attempt to rhyme, the last line was pronounced the proper way, "Ill-i-noy", rather than the colloquial "Ill-i-noise".

Kiddie Kingdom also had a memorable jingle:

(Kids are King!) At Dispensa's Kiddie Kingdom
(Fun's the thing!) At Dispensa's Kiddie Kingdom
Exciting rides (to make you yell and holler)
Any ride a quarter (six for a dollar; this eventually became "five for a dollar")
Dispensa's Kiddie Kingdom... Let's Go!!!

== Closing ==
Despite tremendous growth culminating in its most profitable year in 1984, the business closed in 1985 for economic reasons. Property values had increased in the surrounding area to the point where the underlying land was more valuable than the business itself which prompted the Dispensas to sell the remaining land to a developer. In October 1985, the business was auctioned off by Norton Auctioneers. The site of the toy store and "Kiddie Kingdom" is now occupied by the 31-story Oakbrook Terrace Tower office building.
