= Southern Adventures =

Former amusement park in Alabama

- Interactive map of Southern Adventures
- Location: Huntsville, Alabama, United States
- Coordinates: 34°41′49″N 86°35′40″W
- Opened: 1998; 28 years ago
- Closed: 2018; 8 years ago
- Operating season: May (Memorial Day) to September (Labor Day)
- Area: 200 acres (0.81 km^{2})

Attractions
- Roller coasters: 1

Southern Adventures was an amusement park in Huntsville, Alabama. The amusement park had many rides, such as roller coaster named L'il Renegade, bumper cars, kiddie rides, and an arcade. It also had a water park called Adventure Island Water Park which includes flume slides and kiddie slides.

The park's roller coaster, L'il Renegade, was built by the Allan Herschell Company, and installed in 1999 after being relocated from Sertoma Playland, also in Huntsville. The roller coaster however, closed down with the park in 2018.
