= Carousel of Light =

The Carousel of Light was created by Lance Shinkle, an artist from Falmouth, Massachusetts. It features hand carved horses carved from reclaimed Eastern White Pine. Shinkle began the process of carving the horses in 1988. It took some five years to complete enough horses to set up the carousel. Along with the horses, he carved two wheel-chair accessible chariots and a mermaid sculpture which blows bubbles- thus she has the name, Bubbles. In 1993, Lance purchased a 1947 Allan Herschell carousel to hold the horses. The panels on the mechanism were painted to reflect scenes of Falmouth and Cape Cod. The carousel debuted in July 1993 at the Barnstable County Fair. The next season, Shinkle set up the carousel in Mashpee Commons and operated it there for two years. Later, it stood on the Main Street of Hyannis, Massachusetts. for a summer. The carousel also operated in Grand Central Station for Christmas season.

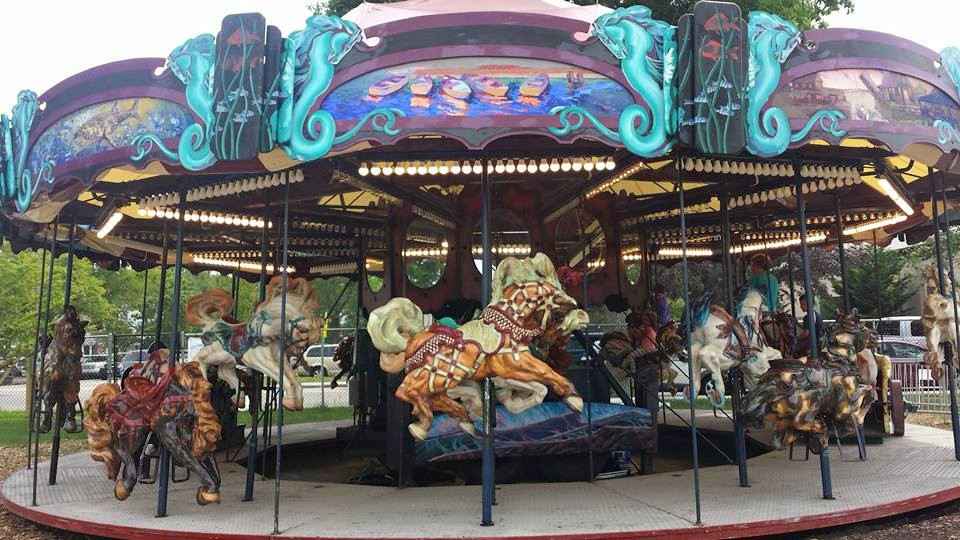
Picture of Carousel of Light taken on location at Mullen Hall School

Shinkle moved to California in 1999 and brought the carousel with him because his father was ill and needed his care. It fell into disrepair. In 2013, Lance brought together a group of civil minded people who had previously formed a committee to help him with the carousel back in his early days. Thus, The Carousel of Light, Inc. was established as a non-profit 501(c)(3) organization. Founding board members of the Carousel of Light, Inc. include Troy B.G.Clarkson, President; Donald Terry, Vice-President; Richard Sherman, clerk-treasurer; James C Bowen, Past President. The mission of the board is to "bring joy to children of all ages by protecting, supporting, and preserving the Carousel of Light for generations to come." The carousel was returned to Falmouth by the non-profit in February 2014.

After an extensive renovation, In the summer of 2014, the Carousel of Light had its inaugural season located on the grounds of the Mullen-Hall School. Over 15,000 riders enjoyed the carousel that year. The Carousel of Light has continued at that location during the summer seasons since.
