= Gulf Coaster =

Defunct roller coaster

California's Great America
- Park section: Orleans Place
- Coordinates: 37.396°N 121.972°W
- Status: Removed
- Opening date: 1976
- Closing date: 1980

Six Flags Great America
- Park section: Orleans Place
- Coordinates: 42.370°N 87.936°W
- Status: Removed
- Opening date: 1976
- Closing date: 1976
- Replaced by: Southern Cross

General statistics
- Type: Steel
- Manufacturer: Allan Herschell Company
- Model: Little Dipper
- Inversions: 0
- Trains: Single train with 3 cars. Riders are arranged 2 across in 2 rows for a total of 12 riders per train.

The Gulf Coaster was a small children's roller coaster that was built for both the Great America parks. Gulf Coaster was built by the Allan Herschell Company with its trains made by Bradley and Kaye. It was a standard "Little Dipper" model. Today, neither of the Gulf Coasters operate.

== Gurnee ==
The Gurnee version was plagued with problems in its only year (1976). The ride closed midway throughout the 1976 season due to several fires and was removed before 1977 and replaced by the Southern Cross skyride. The ride was most likely scrapped.

== Santa Clara ==
The Santa Clara version managed to survive a few years later (mainly due to Santa Clara not getting a Southern Cross skyride). The ride was not as much of a fire hazard as its Gurnee cousin. The little Gulf Coaster made its last run at the end of the 1980 season. It too was most likely scrapped.
