= C.W. Parker Carousel Museum =

Museum in Kansas, United States

Coordinates: 39.3172°N 94.9096°W

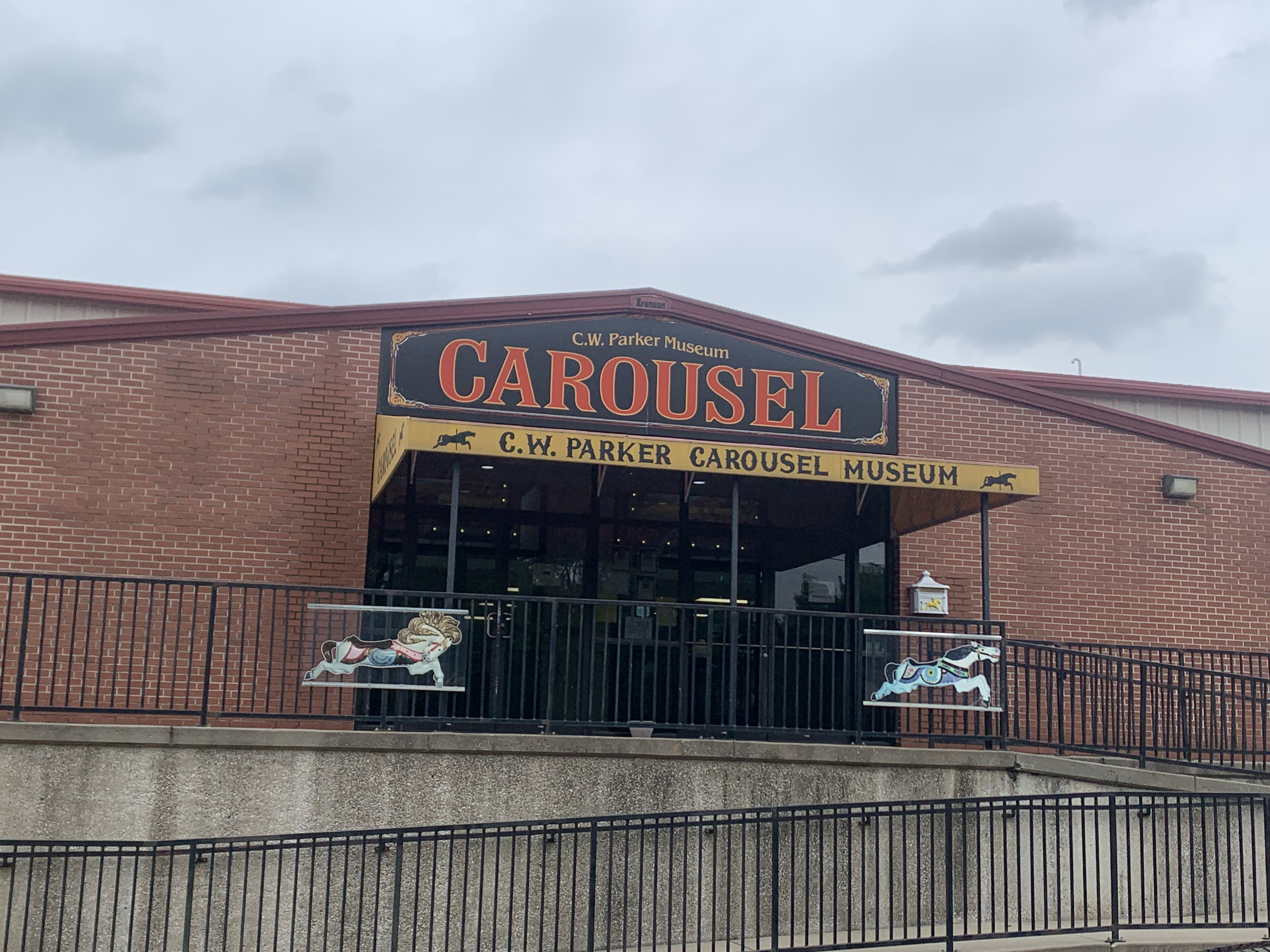
C. W. Parker Carousel Museum in Leavenworth, Kansas

The C.W. Parker Carousel Museum, also known as the Leavenworth Carousel Museum, is located in Leavenworth, Kansas, and is one of several museums sponsored by the Leavenworth Historical Museum Association. Opened in 2005, the building houses carousels that are historically registered, as well as a C.W. Parker cylinder piano, an Artizan A-X-1 band organ, and a Wurlitzer 153 Band Organ. It also has several reproduced or repaired carousel horses.

Charles Wallace Parker (C. W. Parker) manufactured the first Carry-Us-All amusement ride in 1898. This invention was such a success that his quickly growing company in Abilene, Kansas, was moved to Leavenworth.

The Carousel Museum is a non-profit organization that operates through community donations and volunteer efforts.

== Features ==
The carousels housed within the walls of this building are the 1913 Carousel, The Liberty Carousel, and the primitive carousel.

- 1913 Carousel - The main attraction of the C.W Parker Museum is this 1913 Carry-Us-All. The building is named after the original builder of the carousel, C.W Parker. This particular carousel is the 118th production of this amusement ride. This carousel is fully operational and contains 31 unique, hand-carved wooden features, including two bunnies, four ponies, one sleigh ride and one lovers nest tea cup. When obtained by the museum, the carousel and its features spent thousands of hours in restoration before they could meet safety requirements. The ride is available to visitors of all ages. The 1913 carry-us-all moves much faster than modern day carousels.
- The Liberty Carousel - The Liberty carousel was built in the 1950s by Paul Parker, son of C.W Parker. This carousel holds 20 aluminum horses and two benches, with a maximum capacity of 24. Although this carousel is smaller in size than the 1913 carry-us-all, it is unique because it is made of aluminum and has wheels, making it portable. This carousel sits in a separate room of the museum.
- The Primitive Carousel - The exact production date of this carousel is unknown, but has been dated to around 1850 to 1860. The builder is also unknown. When in operation, this carousel would have been manually turned by two men. The horses on this carousel are made from several pieces of wood, but are much less ornate than the 1913 carousel. If asked, the museum volunteers will demonstrate the operation of this carousel, however it is too old to be used. This carousel has 12 paired horses and two benches, which are all suspended from the top frame.
- C.W. Parker Cylinder Piano - Built in around 1900, this piano is hand cranked and plays ten different tunes. Upon first glance this piano appears to be a small upright piano.
- Artizan Style X-A-1 Band Organ - This type of organ was typically used alongside carousel rides at amusement parks. Today, this particular organ provides music during operation of the 1913 carousel.

== Background ==
The C.W Parker Carousel Museum is sponsored by the Leavenworth Historical Museum Association, and is listed as "One of the Eight Wonders of Kansas" (First City Museums). The building is located on the eastern side of downtown Leavenworth, Kansas. Just to the east sits the Missouri River. The historical pieces housed within this building have all been donated, are on loan, or have been paid for through memorial funds or donated funds. Each piece required a significant amount of restoration.

== Restoration ==
Each wooden carousel horse that is attached to the operational carousel required hours of restoration labor. Many of these artifacts dated close to 100 years old with an original life expectancy of only around five years. Upon arrival at the museum, many of the horses had to be completely re-carved because of wood rot. The process of doing so by hand utilized the same primitive tools that would have been used in the original making. In keeping with historical design styles, each horse contains wooden dowels instead of nails. It is estimated that thousands of hours of labor have been volunteered to complete the projects (Reinhardt, 2014).

== See also ==
- Herschell Carrousel Factory Museum
