= Tinkertown Family Fun Park =

Amusement park in Winnipeg, Manitoba

- Interactive map of Tinkertown Family Fun Park
- Location: Springfield, Manitoba, Canada
- Coordinates: 49°50′10″N 96°58′47″W
- Status: Operating
- Owner: Randy Saluk

Attractions
- Total: 24
- Website: tinkertownfunpark.com

Tinkertown Family Fun Park is an outdoor amusement park located in Springfield, Manitoba, just outside of Winnipeg. It is a seasonal amusement park, only being open in the summer.

== History ==
Originally, Tinkertown was an attraction residing within a KOA Campground and Amusement Park. Tinkertown began to draw in more people and became a popular attraction in the 1980s.

Due to Tinkertown's expansion, the campground closed in 1994, and the amusement park was bought by Randy Saluk in 1996.

During the COVID-19 pandemic, the park had to temporarily close but re-opened on June 27, 2020, with certain regulations set in place for safety.

== Attractions ==
In total, the park boast 24 rides and many attractions. The most popular include:

- Train ride
- Carousel
- Ferris wheel
- Bumper cars
- Tilt-a-whirl
- Sea Ray- a pirate ship ride
- Scrambler
- The Wacky Mouse- a roller coaster ride
- Tin lizzie car ride
- An 18-hole mini-golf course
- Gift shop
- Arcade
