= Seven Peaks Water Park Duneland =

Water park in Porter, Indiana, United States

Coordinates: 41.634186°N 87.065812°W

- Industry: Amusement parks and attractions

Enchanted Forest was a small amusement park operated in Porter, Indiana. The park operated from 1957 to 1991. Many rides were moved to Little Amerricka amusement park in Wisconsin after the park closed on August 2, 1991. The park became Splash Down Dunes Water Park in 1994. Splash Down Dunes itself closed down in 2009 after an ownership dispute; the original owner regained ownership in 2010 but the park remained closed. Splash Down Dunes was bought by Seven Peaks Water Park and it re-opened on May 27, 2013, as Seven Peaks Water Park Duneland.

The location of the amusement park is at the intersection of U.S. Route 20 and Indiana State Road 49, north of Chesterton near the border of the Indiana Dunes National Lakeshore.

In June 2017, the park was closed by state officials due to dozens of people receiving chlorine chemical burns. Malfunctioning equipment was determined to be the root cause. At the time, Jo Penney, a spokeswoman for Seven Peaks, said, "the park will remain closed until all the deficiencies are rectified."

In 2019 the water park was sold. The new owner has had the water park demolished. An apartment development was proposed but as of 2025 no building has started.

== Seven Peaks Waterpark Duneland Attractions ==
- Fears Tower – Four speed slides
- Slingshot – A half-pipe water slide
- Vortex – A bowl water slide
- Dune Slides – Four body slides
- Sandcastle Sliders – Three small body slides for kids
- Sandbar Bay – Small pool with a water jungle-gym modeled after a pirate ship
- Duneland Bay – A large wave pool

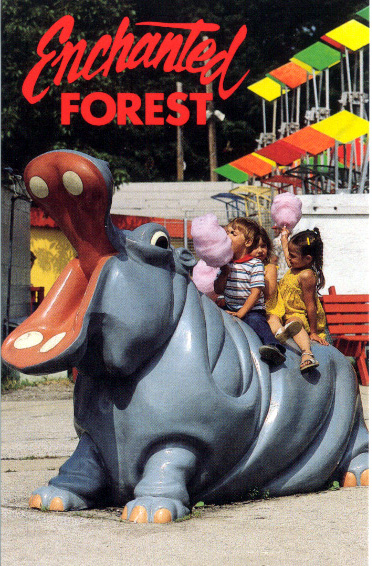
Postcard from Enchanted Forest amusement park in Porter, Porter County, Indiana. From the collection of S. Shook.
