= Herschell–Spillman Motor Company Complex =

- U.S. National Register of Historic Places
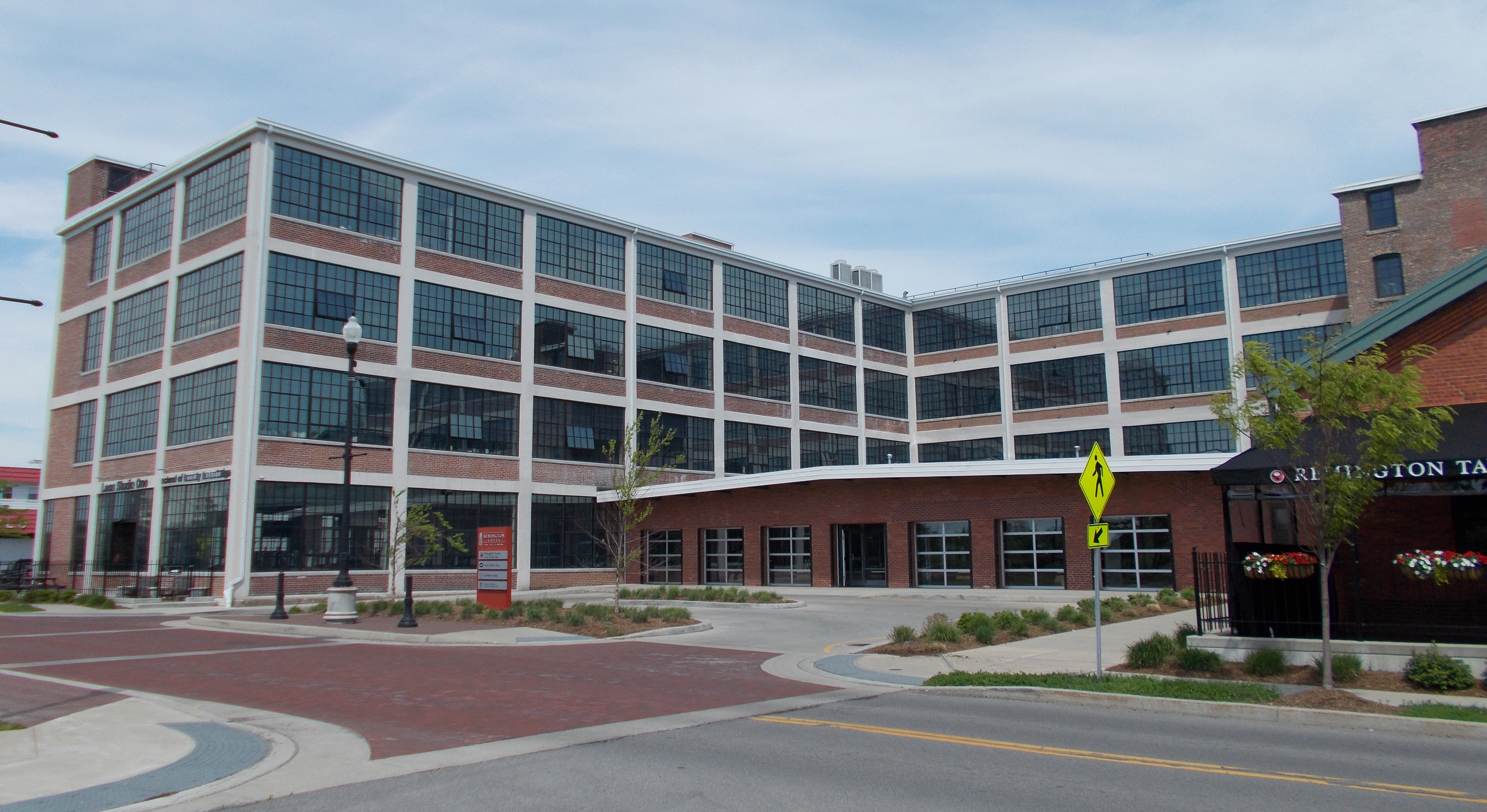
- Herschell–Spillman Motor Company Complex, May 2014

- Location within New York Location within the United States
- Location: 184 Sweeney St., North Tonawanda, New York
- Coordinates: 43°01′23″N 78°52′26″W
- Area: 1.8 acres (0.73 ha)
- Built: c. 1895, 1913, 1917, 1920, 1920-1921
- Built by: Durolithic, Co.; J.W. Cowper Co.
- NRHP reference No.: 13000358
- Added to NRHP: June 5, 2013

Herschell–Spillman Motor Company Complex, also known as the Remington Rand, Inc. Complex, is a historic daylight factory complex located at North Tonawanda, Niagara County, New York. The original section was built about 1895 as the powerhouse for the Buffalo and Niagara Falls Electric Railway. Later reinforced concrete and brick factory additions were made for the Herschell Spillman Company in about 1913, 1917, 1920, and 1920–1921. These include a four-story, section and additions made to earlier buildings to raise them to four stories and form an L-shaped complex. Also on the property is a five-story water tower. Herschell Spillman occupied the plant until it was sold to Remington Rand in 1925. Remington Rand continued operations at the factory until about 1965. The buildings have been renovated into loft apartments.

It was listed on the National Register of Historic Places in 2013.
