= Bell's Amusement Park =

Amusement park in Tulsa, Oklahoma (1951–2006)

- Interactive map of Bell's Amusement Park
- Location: Tulsa, Oklahoma, U.S.
- Coordinates: 36°08′04″N 95°55′52″W
- Status: Defunct
- Opened: 1951
- Closed: 2006
- Owner: Robert Bell
- Operating season: March through September

Attractions
- Total: 17
- Roller coasters: 1 John Allen Wooden Out-and-Back
- Water rides: 1 log flume, 2 water slides

Bell's Amusement Park was an amusement park located in Tulsa's Expo Square, part of the Tulsa State Fairgrounds in Oklahoma. It operated for 55 years before closing in 2006. It was especially known for its large wooden roller coaster, called Zingo, designed by John C. Allen and built in 1966–68.

After the park's closure, its former location was converted into a parking lot, and there are no visible remnants of the park at its former site as of 2026.

== History ==
Robert Bell built a miniature train around his Tulsa house in 1948 and, for a time, ran children's rides at the Admiral Twin drive-in. In March 1951, he started the park at the Fairgrounds with a small collection of rides and amusements. The amusements included a three-car train and a Shetland pony ride. The first adult ride added to the park was a bumper car ride in 1955. In 1957, a Tilt-A-Whirl and miniature golf course were completed. This would later grow into a family-owned amusement park with several dozen rides and attractions.

The park was forced to relinquish its position at the Square at the end of the 2006 season when the county did not renew its lease. The reason given for its removal was nonviable business plans, although it asserted that the 2006 season was the most successful one it had seen for years and expansion plans were underway. It paid $135,000 to the Expo in 2006 and a total of $12.5 million since 1951. The midway for the Tulsa State Fair was provided by Jerry Murphy, owner of Murphy Brothers Exposition. The carnival company was granted, in 2006, a 10-year, non-competitive contract to operate the Tulsa State Fair midway. The 2006 contract included the right of first refusal to expand Murphy's operation into the park's tract during the State Fair, if it was no longer a tenant. Following its closing, the 2007 Tulsa State Fair saw a 7% drop in attendance and a 29% hit on midway ticket sales. Some vendors told the fair board that the board's decision not to renew the park's lease was the reason for the drop, and there were some reports that the loss accounted for some of it. The Fairgrounds CEO said that they did not have any theories at the time to account for it. Attendance was up in the recession of 2008 from 2007, according to the Tulsa World.

The park announced plans to move elsewhere, but the rides remained in a warehouse. Other locations around Northeast Oklahoma were considered for a new home, but it was not rebuilt. In November 2008, Sally Bell ran unsuccessfully for Tulsa County Commissioner.

In 2010, Wagoner County, Oklahoma, negotiated a deal with the Bell family to potentially place the park in Coweta, Oklahoma. On May 25, 2010, Robbie Bell signed a 50-year lease (with a 25-year optional extension) with the county. This deal depended on the voters approving a quarter-cent tax increase to finance building the park; it was to go on the ballot in July 2010. But, after two of the three Wagoner County commissioners raised concerns about whether the plan was financially viable for the county, the commissioners removed the question from the ballot by a 2–1 vote.

Early in 2012, the Bell family installed a few rides at the Saturday Flea Market in West Tulsa. As of August 2013, additional attractions had been installed and Robby Bell III (Robert's grandson) said he had plans to continue restoring more of the rides.

On September 12, 2019, the official Facebook account for Bell’s Amusement Park announced that there are plans for the theme park to come back soon and that the place and location would be announced in the fall, however the question for where will it be is yet to be determined. Robby Bell said in a statement:

We're not gonna talk about much more detail about it just yet because there's too many non-disclosures and stuff like that out there. We can only roll this stuff out when it's ready to be rolled out. One thing that is certain is we're putting it back up, it's just a question of where.

On November 4, 2021, it was announced in a press conference that land for a new Bell's Amusement Park location had been found and purchased in Broken Arrow, Oklahoma.

City officials announced May 10, 2023, that Bell's was no longer coming Broken Arrow, and that property owner of the land intended for the park was planning to sell the property.

== Rides ==
=== Roller coasters ===
- Zingo
- Wildcat (Now closed)

=== Flat rides ===
- Phantasmagoria - Dark Ride
- Scrambler
- Himalaya
- Super Round-Up
- Mind Melt - Larson Drop Tower
- Pharaoh's Fury
- Ferris Wheel
- Der Wellenflug - Wave Swinger
- Spider
- Tilt-a-Whirl

=== Water rides ===
- White Lightnin' - Arrow Log Flume
- Chill Pepper Plunge - Dry Water Slides

=== Wildcat coaster malfunction ===
On April 20, 1997, mechanical failures on the Wildcat roller coaster caused a car near the top of a chain hill to disengage and roll backwards, colliding with another one. The accident killed a fourteen-year-old and injured six others. It was disassembled following the accident and was afterward relocated to Jolly Roger Amusement Park in Ocean City, Maryland, where it operated for a year under the name "Avalanche".

== See also ==
- List of defunct amusement parks
