= Sauzer's Kiddieland =

Former amusement park in Schererville, Indiana, United States

Coordinates: 41.492049°N 87.474494°W

Sauzer's Kiddieland was an amusement park that operated near the U.S. Route 30 and U.S. Route 41 intersection in Schererville, Indiana from 1949 to 1993. The 15-acre (61,000 m^{2}) park was opened and operated by Frank Sauzer and later operated by his son Frank Sauzer Jr., included about 18 rides and a paddle boat pond.

The Swingin' Gyms were saved by a family in Dyer Indiana and eventually found their way to the Coaster Universe Preservation Museum in Ohio.

== Rides ==
- Swan Ride
- Allan Herschell Boat Ride
- Allan Herschell Kiddie Wheel
- Allan Herschell Car Ride
- Allan Herschell Sky Fighter
- Mangels Roto Whip
- Allan Herschell Little Dipper Coaster
- Allan Herschell Mad Mouse Coaster
- S.D.C Galaxi Coaster
- Merry-Go-Round
- Allan Herschell Helicopter Ride
- Bumper Cars
- Mad Mouse Rollercoaster
- Tilt-a-Whirl
- Pony rides
- Miniature train
- Paddle Boats
- Eyerly Spider
- Round Up
- Watkins Paratrooper
- Ferris Wheel
- Eli Bridge Scrambler
- Hand Carts
- Swingin' Gyms

== Restaurant ==
- Sauzer's Waffle House (1941–1990)
