= J's Amusement Park =

Former American amusement park

J's Amusement Park was a theme park located in Guerneville, California. Opened in 1969, the park was founded by Jay Skaggs, and later run by his son, Michael. The park featured a roller coaster, a mad mouse, and several other attractions, including a mini race track. Due to rising costs, the park closed in 2003. The Skaggs family then opened up the back of the property across the creek and among the red woods to run The Camp Outback. This became a popular place for camping complete with large showers, a zip line, hot tub, fire pits and eventually fire spinning. It was a popular party scene and one of the main camp grounds used for large Guerneville events, such as Lazy Bear Weekend. The Skaggs property was still used for special events, including a haunted house event each Halloween called "Dr. Evil's House of Horrors."

It is expected that the 2015 camping season will be the last and Doctor Evil's House of Horrors has announced that it will not be returning.

In 2019, a process to demolish the abandoned park was started to convert the site into a glamping resort.
