= Over-the-Jumps Carousel =

- Herschell-Spillman Carousel
- U.S. National Register of Historic Places
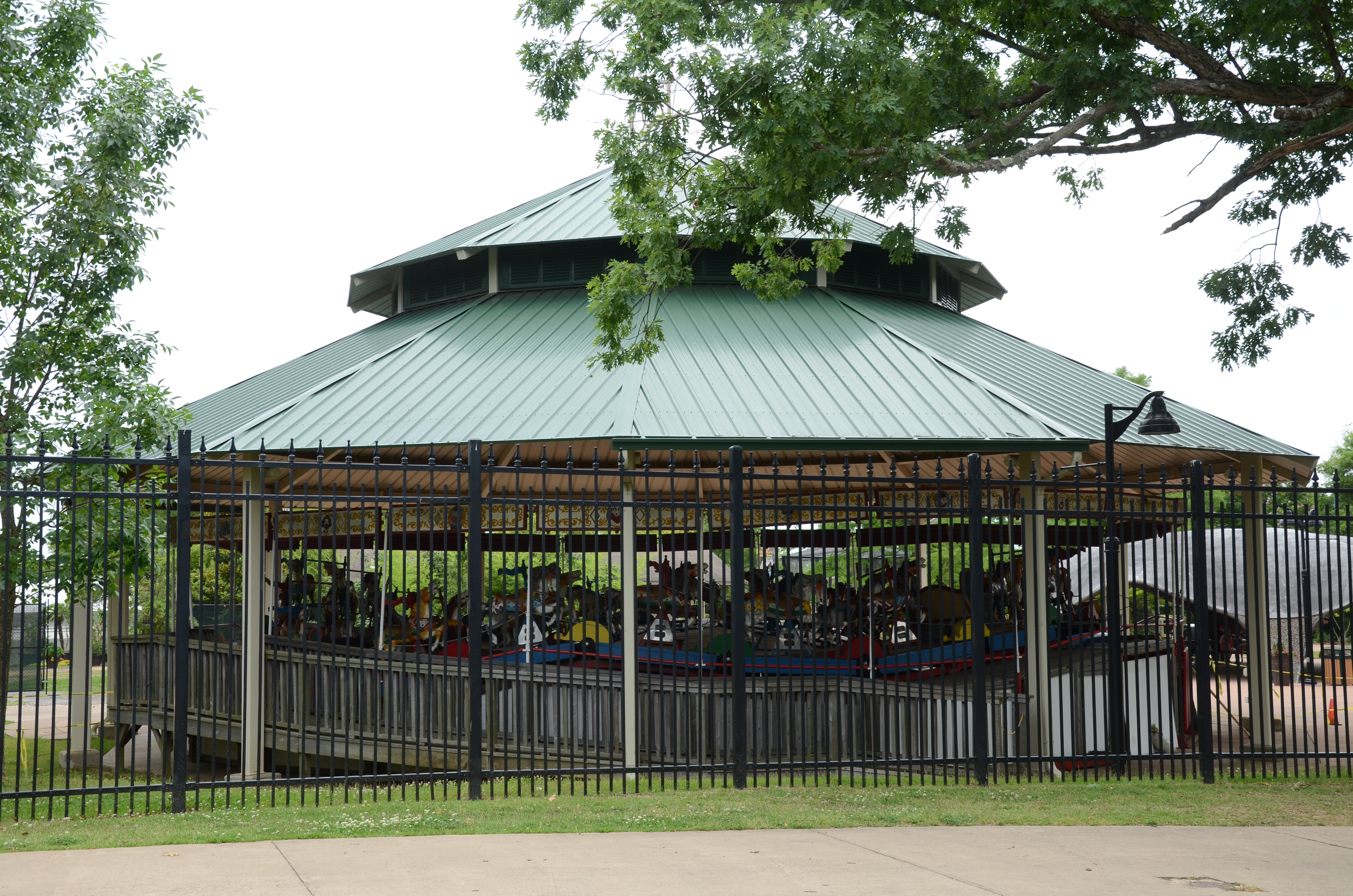

- Location within Arkansas Location within the United States
- Location: Little Rock Zoo, Little Rock, Arkansas
- Coordinates: 34°44′54″N 92°19′48″W
- Area: less than one acre
- Built by: Spillman Engineering Company
- Architectural style: Carousel
- NRHP reference No.: 89002065
- Added to NRHP: December 1, 1989

The Over-the-Jumps Carousel, also known as the Herschell-Spillman Carousel, is a historic carousel at the Little Rock Zoo in Little Rock, Arkansas. Built in the 1920s and first exhibited at the 1924 Arkansas State Fair, it is believed to be the last operating "over-the-jumps" carousel in the world, with an original undulating wooden platform mounted on a 1960s-vintage caterpillar drive. The horses were carved by the Spillman Engineering Company. After many years of private ownership, the carousel was acquired by a local nonprofit group and donated to the zoo in 2007.

The carousel was listed on the National Register of Historic Places in 1989.

== See also ==
- Amusement rides on the National Register of Historic Places
- National Register of Historic Places listings in Little Rock, Arkansas
