= Herschell–Spillman Noah's Ark Carousel =

Historic carousel in Portland, Oregon, U.S.

- U.S. National Register of Historic Places
- Portland Historic Landmark
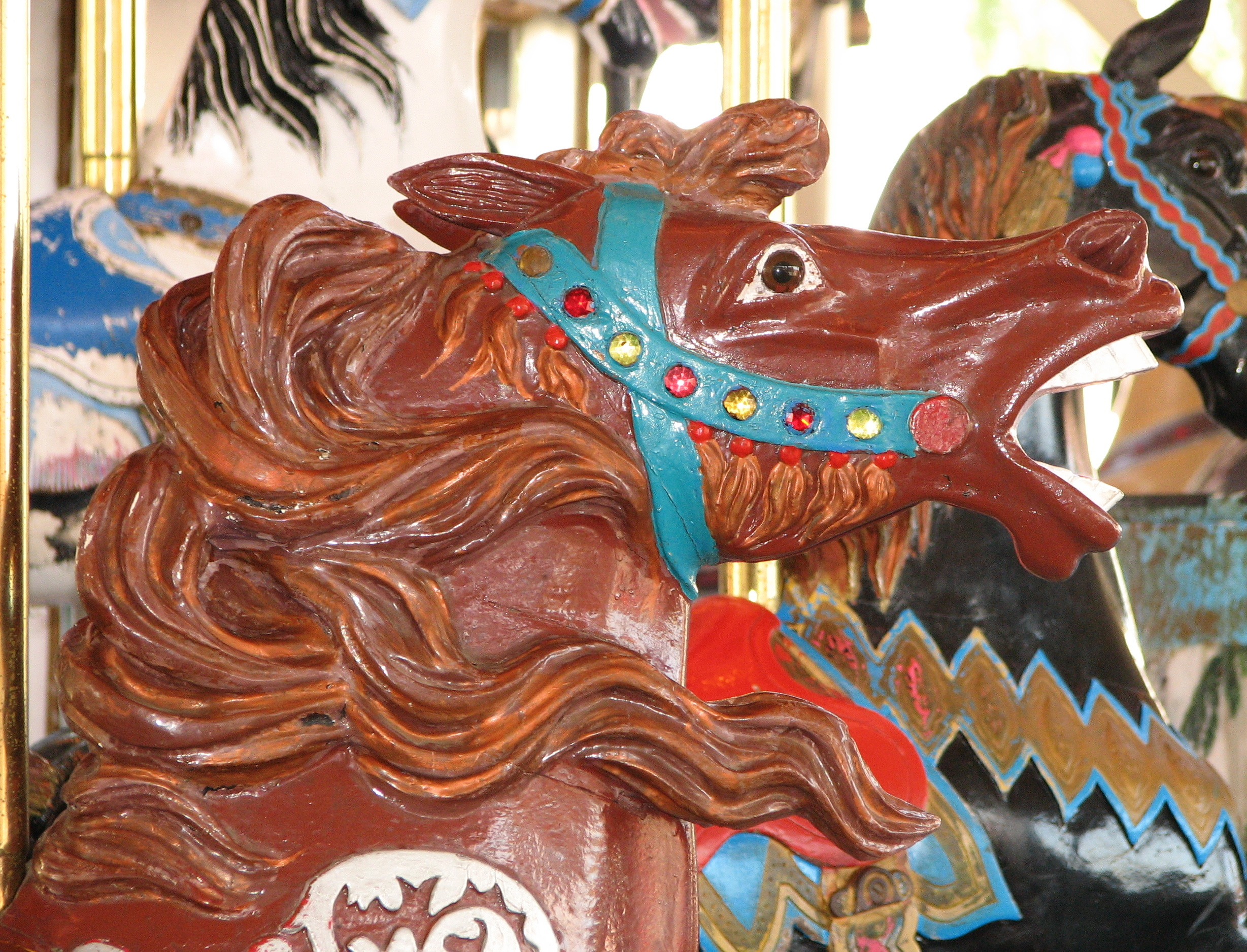
- Details of the Herschell–Spillman Noah's Ark Carousel at Oaks Amusement Park in 2009
- Location: Oaks Amusement Park, East End of Sellwood Bridge, Portland, Oregon
- Coordinates: 45°28′22″N 122°39′44″W
- Built: 1913; 113 years ago
- Architect: Herschell–Spillman Co.
- MPS: Oregon Historic Wooden Carousels TR
- NRHP reference No.: 87001380
- Added to NRHP: August 26, 1987

The Herschell–Spillman Noah's Ark Carousel, located in southeast Portland, Oregon, is listed on the National Register of Historic Places.

Constructed around 1913, it is located within the Oaks Amusement Park, a 121-year-old "trolley park".

== See also ==
- Allan Herschell Company
- Amusement rides on the National Register of Historic Places
- National Register of Historic Places listings in Southeast Portland, Oregon
