= Tilt-A-Whirl =

Amusement park ride

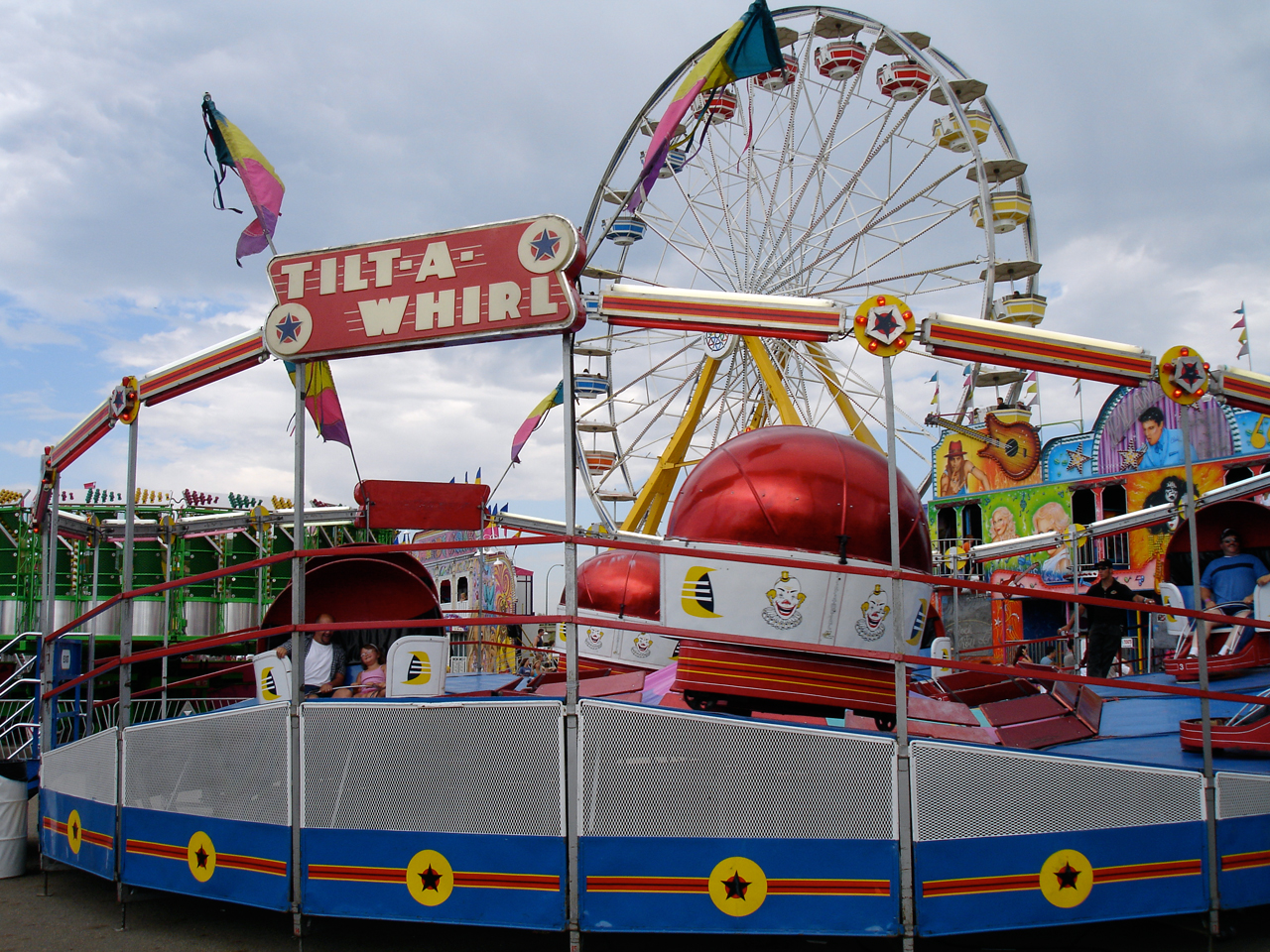
A Tilt-A-Whirl

Tilt-A-Whirl is a flat ride designed for commercial use at amusement parks, fairs, and carnivals. The ride consists of a number of cars which rotate freely while moving in a circle. As the cars revolve, the floor of the ride undulates so that the cars rise and fall as the ride spins. The offset weight of the riders causes each car to rotate. The riders experience varying levels of g-force from the spinning of the car, and the rotation of the ride itself. It is similar to a Waltzer, which is used in Europe. The rides are manufactured by Larson International of Plainview, Texas.

== Description ==
The ride consists of seven freely-spinning cars that hold three or four riders each, which are attached at fixed pivot points on a rotating platform. As the platform rotates, parts of the platform are raised and lowered, with the resulting centrifugal and gravitational forces on the revolving cars causing them to spin in different directions and at variable speeds. The weight of passengers in these cars (as well as the weight distribution) may intensify or dampen the spinning motion of the cars, adding to the unpredictable nature known as chaotic motion.

Physicists Bret M. Huggard and Richard L. Kautz came up with a mathematical equation that approximates the motion of the Tilt-A-Whirl.

This ride is similar to the Waltzer ride commonly found at British and Irish fairs.

== History ==
Herbert Sellner invented the Tilt-A-Whirl in 1926 at his Faribault, Minnesota, home. In 1927, the first 14 Tilt-A-Whirls were built in Sellner's basement and yard. Sellner Manufacturing opened its factory in Faribault and the ride debuted at the Minnesota State Fair. More than a thousand rides were eventually built. Some of the rides produced in the 1940s and 1950s are still in operation.

The earliest Tilt-A-Whirls were constructed of wood, powered by gas motors, and featured nine cars. Modern rides are constructed of steel, aluminum and fiberglass, and are powered by seven small electric motors, and have seven cars.

In 1995, Tovah Sellner took over Sellner Manufacturing after the loss of her husband Bruce Sellner; her daughter Erin Sellner joined her in 1998 and the two of them ran the business together.

After economic downturns in the early 2000s, the Tilt-A-Whirl was not selling as well as it used to, despite new colors and innovations, such as the Generation Five Tilt-A-Whirl which included fiberglass cars and an open design. In 2011, after Sellner Manufacturing missed loan payments from the Economic Development Authority of Faribault, the company was purchased by Larson International Inc, which continues to manufacture the Tilt-A-Whirl.

== Modern Tilt-A-Whirls ==
Modern Tilt-A-Whirls cost in excess of US$300,000 to purchase. A Tilt-A-Whirl package comes with a choice to employ either the famous domed tipkarts (which were introduced back during the 1930s), or Waltzer-style open squat podkarts having headrest bars (that option was introduced by Sellner Manufacturing in 2003).

The oldest operating Tilt-A-Whirl is a 1927 model, traveling with Tom Evans United Shows in the US Midwest. Between six- and seven hundred Tilt-A-Whirls are in operation.

Conneaut Lake Park in Conneaut Lake, Pennsylvania, still has its original Tilt-A-Whirl from 1949.

== Installations ==
Name	Park	Opened	Closed	Details
Tilt-a-Whirl	Adventure Park USA	Unknown	Open	Open-topped cars. Cars have desert scenes painted on them. Ride also referred to as Rattlesnake.
Tilt-A-Whirl	Adventureland (Iowa)	1974	Open	
Tilt-A-Whirl	Adventurer's Park (Brooklyn, New York)	Unknown	Open	
Tilt-A-Whirl	Alabama Splash Adventure	2018	Open	
Tilt-A-Whirl	All Star Adventures (Wichita, Kansas)	Unknown	Open	
Tilt-a-Whirl	Amusements of America (Showman)	Unknown	Open	
Tilt-a-Whirl	Arnolds Park	Unknown	Open	
Tilt-a-Whirl	Bay Beach Amusement Park	1982	Seasonal	
Tilt-a-Whirl	Beech Bend Park	Unknown	Open	
Unknown	Bell's Amusement Park	1957	Closed	
Tilt-a-Whirl	Belle City Amusements (Showman)	Unknown	Open	
Tilt-a-Whirl	Belmont Park	Unknown	Open	Includes ice cream-shaped ride vehicles.
Tilt-A-Whirl	Bertrand Island Amusement Park	Unknown	Closed	
Tilt-A-Whirl	Big Rock Amusements (Showman)	Unknown	Open	
Tilt-A-Whirl	Blue Bayou and Dixie Landin'	Unknown	Open	
Tilt-A-Whirl	Blue Sky Amusements (Showman)	Unknown	Unknown	
Tilt-a-Whirl	Boblo Island Amusement Park	Unknown	Closed	
Tilt-a-Whirl	Bowcraft Amusement Park	Unknown	Closed	
Tilt-O-World	Buckroe Beach Amusement Park	Unknown	Closed	
Unknown	Bushkill Park	Unknown	Closed	Purchased by and refurbished by Eldridge Park.
Tilt A Whirl	Butler Amusements (Showman)	Unknown	Open	
Tilt-a-Whirl	Camden Park	Unknown	Open	
Tilt-A-Whirl	Camp's Amusements (Showman)	Unknown	Open	
Twist & Shout	Canobie Lake Park	Unknown	Open	Relocated from Palisades Amusement Park.
Tilt-a-Whirl	Carousel Gardens Amusement Park	Unknown	Open	Open-topped cars.
Tilt-a-Whirl	Casino Pier	Unknown	Open	Open-topped cars.
Tilt-a-Whirl	Castle Park	Unknown	Open	
Linus' Beetle Bugs	Cedar Point	1999	Open	Previously known as Tilt-a-Whirl. Named after Peanuts character Linus.
Tennessee Twister	Dollywood	1993	2004	
Tilt-a-Whirl	Elitch Gardens (Denver, Colorado)	Unknown	Unknown	Seen in video footage dated 1980.
Tilt-O-Whirl	Enchanted Forest Water Safari	Unknown	Open	
Tilt-a-Whirl	Fun Spot America Theme Parks (Kissimmee)	Unknown	Open	
Tilt-a-Whirl	Fun Spot America Theme Parks (Orlando)	Unknown	Open	Open-topped cars.
Tilt-a-Whirl	Funtimes Fun Park	2018	Open	Originally at Geauga Lake.
Tilt-A-Whirl	Hersheypark	1983	Open	
Turkey Whirl	Holiday World & Splashin' Safari	2007	Open	Includes turkey-shaped ride vehicles.
Tilt-a-Whirl	Knoebels Amusement Resort	1991	Open	
Tilt-a-Whirl	Lagoon Amusement Park	1954	Open	
Tilt-a-Whirl	Land Of Make Believe	Unknown	Open	
Tilt-A-Whirl	Long Park Park, Geneseo, NY, West Side of Conesus Lake	1950	1990	Tilt-A-Whirl Ride was sold at the Long Point Park Auction of the rides by Norton Auctioneers in September 1990. Not sure where the ride went from there as the newspaper's report listed many errors pertaining to the rides new owners.
Shark Frenzy	Pacific Park	2017	Open	Includes shark-shaped ride vehicles.
Tilt-A-Whirl	Santa's Workshop (Colorado)	Unknown	Open	
Tilt-A-Whirl	Seabreeze Amusement Park, Rochester, NY	Unknown	Open	
Riptide	Santa Cruz Beach Boardwalk, Santa Cruz, CA	1955	Open	
HARLEY QUINN Wild Whirl	Six Flags Over Georgia	2015	Open	Previously known as Harley Quinn Spinsanity.
Turtle Twirl	Story Land	Unknown	Open	Includes turtle-shaped ride vehicles.
Tilt-A-Whirl	Tilt Studio (Katy Mills Mall, Katy TX)	Unknown	Open	
Tilt-a-Whirl	Thomas Amusements (Newfoundland and Labrador, Canada)	Unknown	Seasonal	
Tilter	Valleyfair!	1976	Seasonal	Previously known as Tilt-A-Whirl. Originally installed near the end of High Roller rollercoaster next to the Giant Tilt Ride. It was moved next to the entrance of Wild Thing rollercoaster in 1996 when that was built. It was moved again in 2014 underneath the figure 8 portion of Wild Thing with the installation of the Route 66 area.
Giant Tilt Ride	Valleyfair!	1976	Closed	This was the only Super Tilt model of Tilt-A-Whirl ever manufactured by Sellner Manufacturing Company, Inc. It featured 14 cars in two rows and was strangely placed right next to Valleyfair!'s other Tilt-A-Whirl ride.
Tilt-A-Whirl	Waldameer & Water World	1964	Open	

== Incidents and accidents ==
On September 22, 2018, a Tilt-A-Whirl operated by Thomas Amusements in St. John's, Newfoundland, malfunctioned when two of the cars crashed into each other causing the top of one of the cars to fall off and on to the platform. No serious injuries resulted but some of the passengers suffered minor injuries.

== See also ==
- List of amusement rides
- List of closed rides and attractions
- Sellner Manufacturing
