= National Register of Historic Places listings in Broome County, New York =

Location of Broome County in New York

This is a list of the properties on the National Register of Historic Places in Broome County, New York, taken from the National Register of Historic Places for Broome County.

This is intended to be a complete list of properties and districts listed on the National Register of Historic Places in Broome County, New York. The locations of National Register properties and districts for which the latitude and longitude coordinates are included below, may be seen in a map.

This National Park Service list is complete through NPS recent listings posted June 6, 2026.

Contents: Counties in New York
Albany (Albany) – Allegany – Bronx – Broome – Cattaraugus – Cayuga – Chautauqua – Chemung – Chenango – Clinton – Columbia – Cortland – Delaware – Dutchess (Poughkeepsie, Rhinebeck) – Erie (Buffalo) – Essex – Franklin – Fulton – Genesee – Greene – Hamilton – Herkimer – Jefferson – Kings – Lewis – Livingston – Madison – Monroe (Rochester) – Montgomery – Nassau – New York (Below 14th Street, 14th to 59th Streets, 59th to 110th Streets, Above 110th Street, Islands) – Niagara (Niagara Falls) – Oneida – Onondaga (Syracuse) – Ontario – Orange – Orleans – Oswego – Otsego – Putnam – Queens – Rensselaer – Richmond – Rockland – St. Lawrence – Saratoga – Schenectady – Schoharie – Schuyler – Seneca – Steuben – Suffolk – Sullivan – Tioga – Tompkins – Ulster – Warren – Washington – Wayne – Westchester (Northern, Southern, New Rochelle, Peekskill, Yonkers) – Wyoming – Yates

== Current listings ==
| | Name on the Register | Image | Date listed | Location | City or town | Description |
|---|---|---|---|---|---|---|
| 1 | Abel Bennett Tract Historic District | Abel Bennett Tract Historic District | February 19, 2008 (#08000035) | Bounded by Riverside Dr., Seminary & St. John Aves., & Beethoven St. 42°05′42″N 75°55′48″W | Binghamton | |
| 2 | Ansco Company Charles Street Factory Buildings | | August 22, 2012 (#12000531) | 15 & 17 Charles, & 219 Clinton Sts. 42°06′25″N 75°55′52″W | Binghamton | part of the Industrial Resources of Broome County, New York Multiple Property Submission (MPS) |
| 3 | Bevier-Wright House | Bevier-Wright House | May 21, 2008 (#08000446) | 776 Chenango St. 42°08′15″N 75°53′41″W | Port Dickinson | |
| 4 | Binghamton City Hall | Binghamton City Hall | March 18, 1971 (#71000530) | Collier St. between Court and Academy Sts. 42°05′53″N 75°54′45″W | Binghamton | |
| 5 | Binghamton Railway Company Complex | Binghamton Railway Company Complex | November 29, 2006 (#06001076) | 375 State St. 42°06′25″N 75°54′33″W | Binghamton | |
| 6 | Binghamton Theatre | Binghamton Theatre | January 23, 2008 (#07001451) | 236 Washington St. 42°06′14″N 75°54′44″W | Binghamton | |
| 7 | Broome County Courthouse | Broome County Courthouse | May 22, 1973 (#73001164) | Court St. 42°05′53″N 75°54′42″W | Binghamton | |
| 8 | Building at 171–177 Clinton Street | Building at 171–177 Clinton Street | December 31, 2002 (#02001641) | 171–177 Clinton St. 42°06′20″N 75°55′36″W | Binghamton | |
| 9 | Harlow E. Bundy House | Harlow E. Bundy House | May 11, 2011 (#11000269) | 129 Main St. 42°06′06″N 75°55′41″W | Binghamton | |
| 10 | Cameo Theatre | Cameo Theatre | November 21, 2022 (#100008388) | 234 Robinson St. 42°06′28″N 75°53′01″W | Binghamton | |
| 11 | Chenango Canal Prism and Lock 107 | Chenango Canal Prism and Lock 107 | June 18, 2010 (#10000359) | River Rd. 42°14′24″N 75°50′24″W | Chenango Forks | |
| 12 | Christ Church | Christ Church | December 2, 1974 (#74001221) | Corner of Washington and Henry Sts. 42°06′01″N 75°54′50″W | Binghamton | |
| 13 | Conklin Town Hall | Conklin Town Hall | December 20, 2006 (#06001146) | 1271 Conklin Rd. 42°02′58″N 75°48′22″W | Conklin | |
| 14 | Court Street Historic District | Court Street Historic District | September 7, 1984 (#84002066) | Roughly bounded by the Chenango River, Carroll, Henry, and Hawley Sts. 42°05′55″N 75°54′42″W | Binghamton | |
| 15 | Drovers Inn and Round Family Residence | Drovers Inn and Round Family Residence | April 26, 2010 (#10000222) | 2 Pumphouse Rd. and 301 Main St. 42°05′00″N 76°03′11″W | Vestal | |
| 16 | Alfred Dunk House | Alfred Dunk House | March 21, 1985 (#85000593) | 4 Pine St. 42°06′01″N 75°53′45″W | Binghamton | |
| 17 | Endicott-Johnson Medical Clinic | Endicott-Johnson Medical Clinic | September 29, 2015 (#15000672) | 305 Clinton St. 42°06′35″N 75°56′10″W | Binghamton | Built in 1928 to serve employees of eponymous corporation |
| 18 | Endicott Square Deal Arch | Endicott Square Deal Arch | February 23, 2001 (#01000171) | Main St., E of Vestal Ave. 42°06′41″N 75°56′46″W | Endicott | |
| 19 | Emmanuel Church of the Evangelical Association of Binghamton | Emmanuel Church of the Evangelical Association of Binghamton | November 20, 2009 (#09000941) | 80 Front St. 42°05′45″N 75°55′07″W | Binghamton | |
| 20 | Cyrus Gates Farmstead | Cyrus Gates Farmstead | January 11, 1999 (#98001549) | 10-17 Old Nanticoke Rd. 42°14′50″N 76°02′19″W | Maine | Farm of mapmaker and abolitionist |
| 21 | First Presbyterian Church of Deposit | First Presbyterian Church of Deposit | December 3, 2019 (#100004734) | 129 Second St. 42°03′48″N 75°25′21″W | Deposit | 1880 Lawrence Valk church with auditorium plan, shared with Delaware County |
| 22 | General Cigar Company–Ansco Camera Factory Building | General Cigar Company–Ansco Camera Factory Building | August 22, 2012 (#12000532) | 16 Emma St. 42°06′39″N 75°56′31″W | Binghamton | part of the Industrial Resources of Broome County, New York MPS |
| 23 | Goodwill Theatre | Goodwill Theatre | January 7, 2000 (#99001655) | 36 Willow St. 42°06′50″N 75°57′20″W | Johnson City | |
| 24 | Grace Episcopal Church | Grace Episcopal Church | August 28, 1998 (#98001113) | 2624 Main St. 42°19′45″N 75°58′07″W | Whitney Point | part of the Historic Churches of the Episcopal Diocese of Central New York MPS |
| 25 | Harpursville United Methodist Church | Harpursville United Methodist Church | January 18, 2006 (#05001532) | NY 79; 42°10′41″N 75°37′28″W | Harpursville | |
| 26 | Old Hawleyton Methodist Episcopal Church | Old Hawleyton Methodist Episcopal Church | September 28, 2006 (#06000893) | 923 Hawleyton Rd. 42°01′08″N 75°55′00″W | Hawleyton | |
| 27 | Highland Park Carousel | Highland Park Carousel | January 25, 1992 (#91001963) | Highland Park, Hooper Rd. 42°07′30″N 76°01′46″W | Endwell | part of the Broome County Carousels MPS |
| 28 | Jedediah Hotchkiss House | | June 3, 1982 (#82003348) | 10 Chestnut St. 42°04′15″N 75°37′58″W | Windsor | |
| 29 | Johnson City High School | | November 3, 2025 (#100012401) | 435 Main Street; 42°06′57″N 75°57′49″W | Johnson City | The old high school building. |
| 30 | Johnson City Historic District | Johnson City Historic District | August 30, 2011 (#11000593) | Generally Corless Ave., Arch St., Main St., Lester Ave. & Helen Dr. 42°06′51″N 75°57′14″W | Johnson City | |
| 31 | Johnson City Square Deal Arch | Johnson City Square Deal Arch | February 16, 2001 (#01000044) | Main St., W of Floral Ave. 42°05′41″N 76°03′27″W | Johnson City | |
| 32 | C. Fred Johnson Park Carousel | C. Fred Johnson Park Carousel | January 25, 1992 (#91001968) | C. Fred Johnson Park; 42°07′02″N 75°57′01″W | Johnson City | part of the Broome County Carousels MPS |
| 33 | George F. Johnson Recreation Park Carousel | George F. Johnson Recreation Park Carousel | January 25, 1992 (#91001967) | George F. Johnson Recreation Park; 42°05′57″N 75°56′02″W | Binghamton | part of the Broome County Carousels MPS |
| 34 | George W. Johnson Park Carousel | George W. Johnson Park Carousel | January 25, 1992 (#91001964) | George W. Johnson Park; 42°06′40″N 76°03′03″W | Endicott | part of the Broome County Carousels MPS |
| 35 | Gen. Edward F. Jones House | Gen. Edward F. Jones House | February 9, 2005 (#05000020) | 9 Asbury Court; 42°05′58″N 75°55′37″W | Binghamton | |
| 36 | Jonas M. Kilmer House | Jonas M. Kilmer House | September 29, 2006 (#06000885) | 9 Riverside Dr. 42°05′32″N 75°55′19″W | Binghamton | |
| 37 | Lithuanian National Association Hall | Lithuanian National Association Hall | September 29, 2015 (#15000673) | 315 Clinton St. 42°06′36″N 75°56′12″W | Binghamton | 1917 structure was important social center for immigrant community for the next half-century |
| 38 | Main Street Historic District | Main Street Historic District | October 29, 2021 (#100007083) | 5-131 1/2 and 8-142 Main, 80-138 and 83-155 Front, 109 Oak, 115 Murray, and 89 Walnut Sts. 42°05′57″N 75°55′14″W | Binghamton | |
| 39 | Maine Central School | Maine Central School | January 7, 1998 (#97001619) | Church St. 42°11′38″N 76°03′51″W | Maine | |
| 40 | Marlborough Building | Marlborough Building | February 19, 2008 (#08000036) | 81 Clinton St. 42°06′25″N 75°55′20″W | Binghamton | |
| 41 | New York State Inebriate Asylum | New York State Inebriate Asylum | July 24, 1996 (#96000814) | 425 Robinson St. 42°06′22″N 75°51′59″W | Binghamton | |
| 42 | Ouaquaga Lenticular Truss Bridge | Ouaquaga Lenticular Truss Bridge | February 20, 2003 (#03000048) | Dutchman Rd. over Susquehanna R 42°07′24″N 75°38′52″W | Ouaquaga | |
| 43 | Patterson-Hooper Family Cemetery | Patterson-Hooper Family Cemetery | May 21, 2008 (#08000447) | River Rd. 42°06′23″N 76°01′07″W | Endwell | |
| 44 | Phelps Mansion | Phelps Mansion | June 4, 1973 (#73001165) | 191 Court St. 42°06′03″N 75°54′20″W | Binghamton | |
| 45 | Railroad Terminal Historic District | Railroad Terminal Historic District | March 20, 1986 (#86000488) | Intersection of Chenango St. and Erie-Lackawanna RR tracks 42°06′15″N 75°54′29″W | Binghamton | |
| 46 | Riverside Cemetery | Riverside Cemetery | August 11, 2004 (#04000824) | 400 Vestal Ave. 42°05′37″N 76°03′31″W | Endicott | |
| 47 | Roberson Mansion | Roberson Mansion | March 25, 1980 (#80002591) | 30 Front St. 42°05′39″N 75°55′08″W | Binghamton | |
| 48 | Robert H. Rose House | Robert H. Rose House | August 26, 1980 (#80002592) | 3 Riverside Dr. 42°05′33″N 75°55′13″W | Binghamton | |
| 49 | Ross Park Carousel | Ross Park Carousel | January 25, 1992 (#91001966) | Ross Park; 42°04′31″N 75°54′28″W | Binghamton | part of the Broome County Carousels MPS |
| 50 | Saints Cyril and Methodius Slovak Roman Catholic School | Saints Cyril and Methodius Slovak Roman Catholic School | March 1, 2007 (#07000095) | 144-146 Clinton St. 42°06′21″N 75°55′30″W | Binghamton | |
| 51 | Sheltered Workshop for the Disabled Building | Sheltered Workshop for the Disabled Building | January 2, 2024 (#100009750) | 200-204 Court Street; 42°06′02″N 75°54′15″W | Binghamton | |
| 52 | South Washington Street Parabolic Bridge | South Washington Street Parabolic Bridge | January 30, 1978 (#78001842) | S. Washington St. 42°05′33″N 75°54′54″W | Binghamton | |
| 53 | State Street-Henry Street Historic District | State Street-Henry Street Historic District | June 25, 1986 (#86001384) | Roughly bounded by Lewis St., Prospect Ave., Henry St., and Water and Washington Sts.; also 221 Washington Street to Lewis Street; 1 Lewis Street to Prospect Avenue; 212 State Street to CP Rail Systems track; East Clinton Street; 42°06′05″N 75°54′44″W | Binghamton | Second set of addresses represent a boundary increase approved February 26, 2024. |
| 54 | Stone Spillway, National Defense Stockpile Center | | April 20, 2004 (#04000347) | N of Gilmore Ave. 42°09′18″N 75°52′34″W | Hillcrest | |
| 55 | Trinity Memorial Church | Trinity Memorial Church | November 19, 1998 (#98001389) | 44 Main St. 42°05′59″N 75°53′01″W | Binghamton | part of the Historic Churches of the Episcopal Diocese of Central New York MPS |
| 56 | US Post Office-Endicott | US Post Office-Endicott | November 17, 1988 (#88002498) | 200 Washington Ave. 42°06′02″N 76°02′55″W | Endicott | part of the US Post Offices in New York State, 1858-1943, Thematic Resource (TR) |
| 57 | US Post Office-Johnson City | US Post Office-Johnson City | May 11, 1989 (#88002336) | 307 Main St. 42°06′57″N 75°57′31″W | Johnson City | part of the US Post Offices in New York State, 1858-1943, TR |
| 58 | U.S. Post Office and Courthouse | U.S. Post Office and Courthouse | April 13, 2020 (#100005168) | 15 Henry St. 42°06′03″N 75°54′45″W | Binghamton | 1935 classically-influenced modern federal building by Conrad and Cummings |
| 59 | Vestal Central School | Vestal Central School | February 22, 2010 (#10000023) | 201 Main St. 42°05′05″N 76°03′05″W | Vestal | |
| 60 | Washingtonian Hall | Washingtonian Hall | February 23, 1996 (#96000134) | 3725 River Rd. 42°06′39″N 76°00′16″W | Endwell | |
| 61 | J. Stuart Wells House | J. Stuart Wells House | August 21, 2009 (#09000628) | 71 Main St. 42°05′59″N 75°55′21″W | Binghamton | |
| 62 | West Endicott Hose Company No. 1 | West Endicott Hose Company No. 1 | August 27, 2013 (#13000625) | 113 N. Page Ave. 42°05′56″N 76°04′25″W | West Endicott | |
| 63 | West Endicott Park Carousel | West Endicott Park Carousel | January 25, 1992 (#91001965) | West Endicott Park; 42°05′53″N 76°04′24″W | Endicott | part of the Broome County Carousels MPS |
| 64 | John T. Whitmore House | John T. Whitmore House | August 14, 1986 (#86001653) | 111 Murray St. 42°05′56″N 75°55′18″W | Binghamton | |
| 65 | Henry Whitney House | Henry Whitney House | March 13, 2017 (#100000752) | 2835 Hickory St. 42°19′32″N 75°57′23″W | Whitney Point | Intact 1855 Italianate farmhouse was built by one of village's founders |
| 66 | Windsor Village Historic District | Windsor Village Historic District | July 30, 1980 (#80002593) | College Ave., Academy, Chapel, Church, Dewey, Elm and Main Sts. 42°04′39″N 75°38′39″W | Windsor | |
| 67 | Your Home Library | Your Home Library | October 5, 2005 (#05001138) | 107 Main St. 42°06′47″N 75°56′59″W | Johnson City | |

== Former listings ==
| | Name on the Register | Image | Date listed | Date removed | Location | City or town | Description |
|---|---|---|---|---|---|---|---|
| 1 | State Theater | | July 21, 1988 (#88001020) | January 30, 1995 | 148 Front Street | Deposit | Destroyed by fire on September 24, 1994. |

== See also ==
- National Register of Historic Places listings in New York
