= Rose House =

Rose House may refer to:

== Historic houses ==
=== United Kingdom ===
- 70 Barnes High Street, Barnes, London, also known as the Rose House

=== United States ===
- Edward Rose House, Fayette, Alabama
- Sherman Rose House, Monterey, California
- Rufus M. Rose House, Atlanta, Georgia
- Ben Rose House, Highland Park, Illinois
- David Garland Rose House, Valparaiso, Indiana
- John and Ruth Rose House, Granville, Massachusetts
- Robert H. Rose House, Binghamton, New York
- John Rose House, or Esperanza, Jerusalem, New York
- William H. Rose House, Stony Point, New York
- Benoni Rose House, North Kingstown, Rhode Island
- Thomas Rose House, Charleston, South Carolina

== Other uses ==
- Rose House, a Taiwanese tea and restaurant brand founded by Huang Teng-hui
- Rose/House, a 2023 novella by Arkady Martine
