= Face the Music (music ensemble) =

Face the Music performing at the Brooklyn Lyceum, May 12, 2010

Face the Music is a youth new music ensemble comprising more than 160 students from the New York City area, ages 9–17, who focus on performing works by living composers. One of the few American youth ensembles that is dedicated to contemporary music, they have been called "polished, exuberant" and one of “New York’s favorite contemporary-classical ensembles”

The group has given world premieres of commissioned works by Joe Phillips and Frances Schwartz, as well as the U.S. premieres of works by Gérard Grisey and Anton Batagov. They have also performed works by Nico Muhly, Terry Riley, Tristan Perich and Steve Reich. In residence at Kaufman Music Center, they have performed numerous times at Merkin Concert Hall, as well as Brooklyn Lyceum, BAMCafe, Le Poisson Rouge, Queens Museum of Art, El Museo del Barrio, The Tank and Poets House. They have also participated in Make Music New York, Look and Listen Festival, Bang On A Can Marathon Ecstatic Music Festival and the Vox Novus Festival.

== Videos ==
- Performing Phil Kline’s “Exquisite Corpses” in a live broadcast from WNYC’s Greene Space on April 30, 2009
