= Raymond F. Almirall =

American architect (1869-1939)

- Born: 1869; New York City, New York, U.S.
- Died: 1939 (aged 69–70)
- Occupation: Architect
- Practice: Ingle & Almirall; R. F. Almirall; Almirall & Cusachs

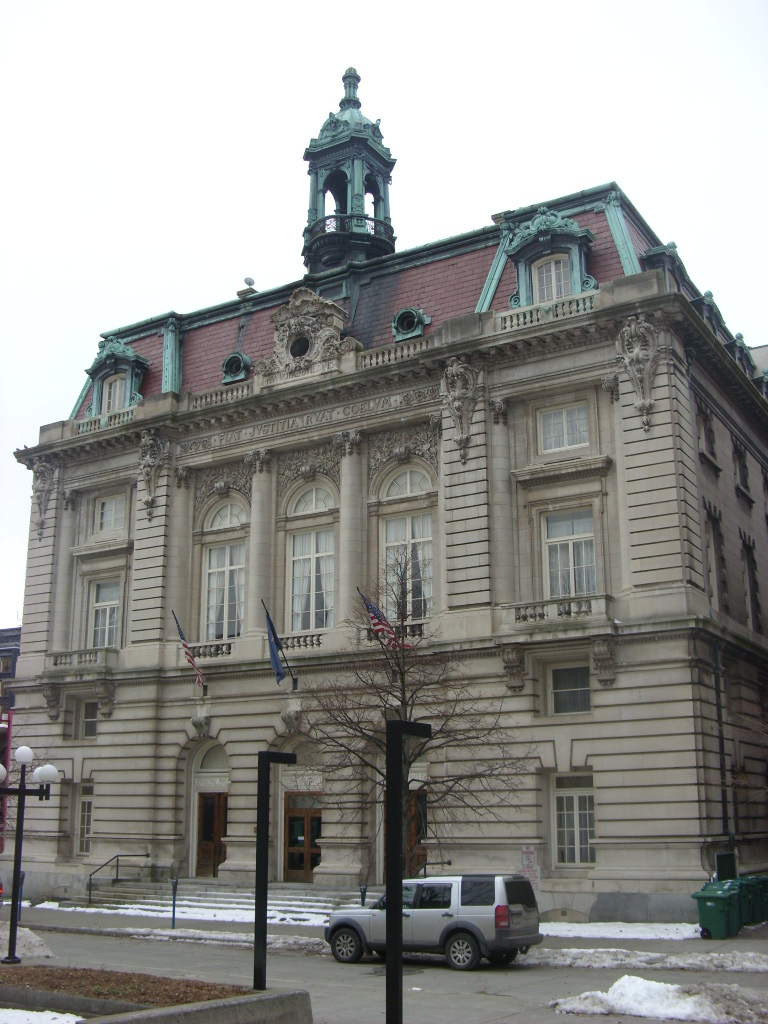
The Municipal Building in Binghamton, New York in 1897

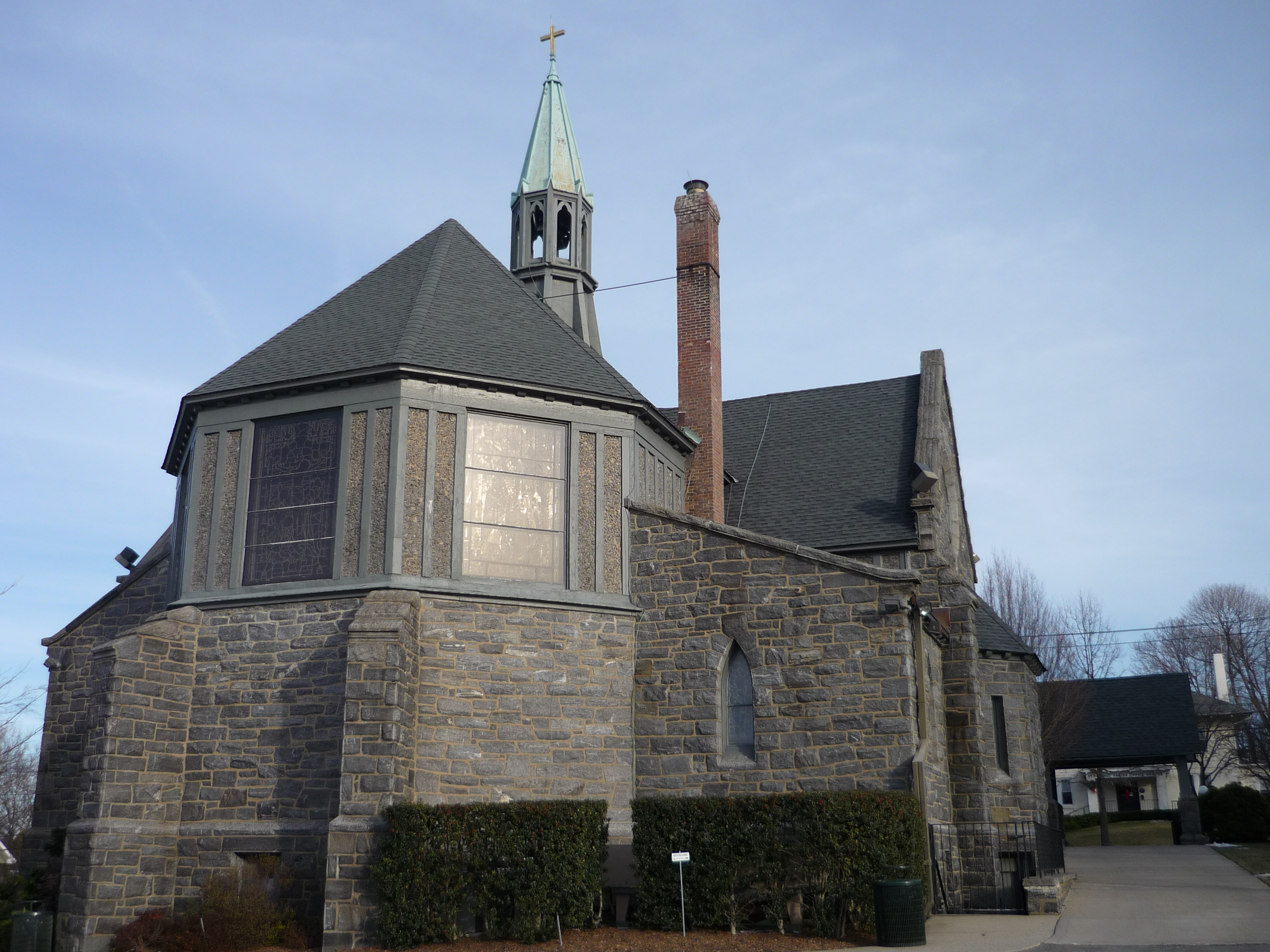
St. Dominic Church in Oyster Bay, New York in 1897

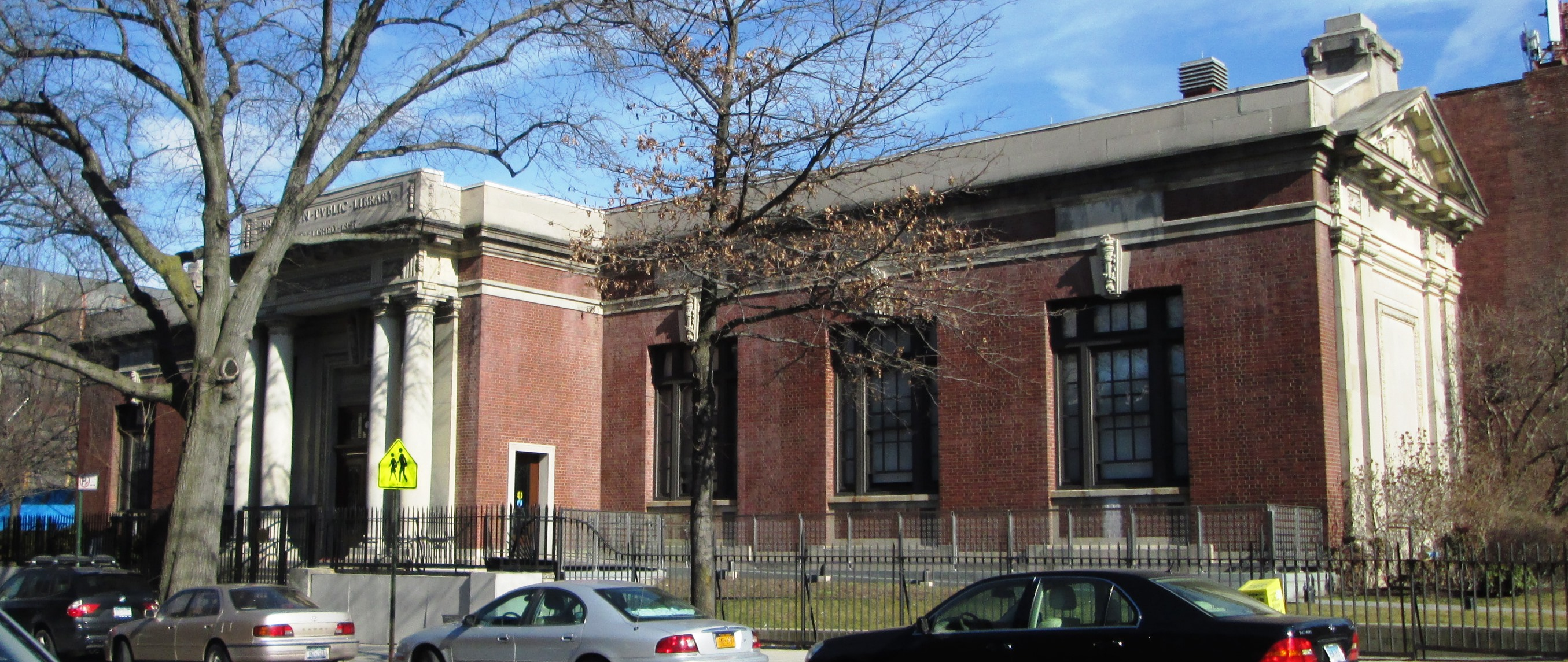
Park Slope Library in Brooklyn in 1906

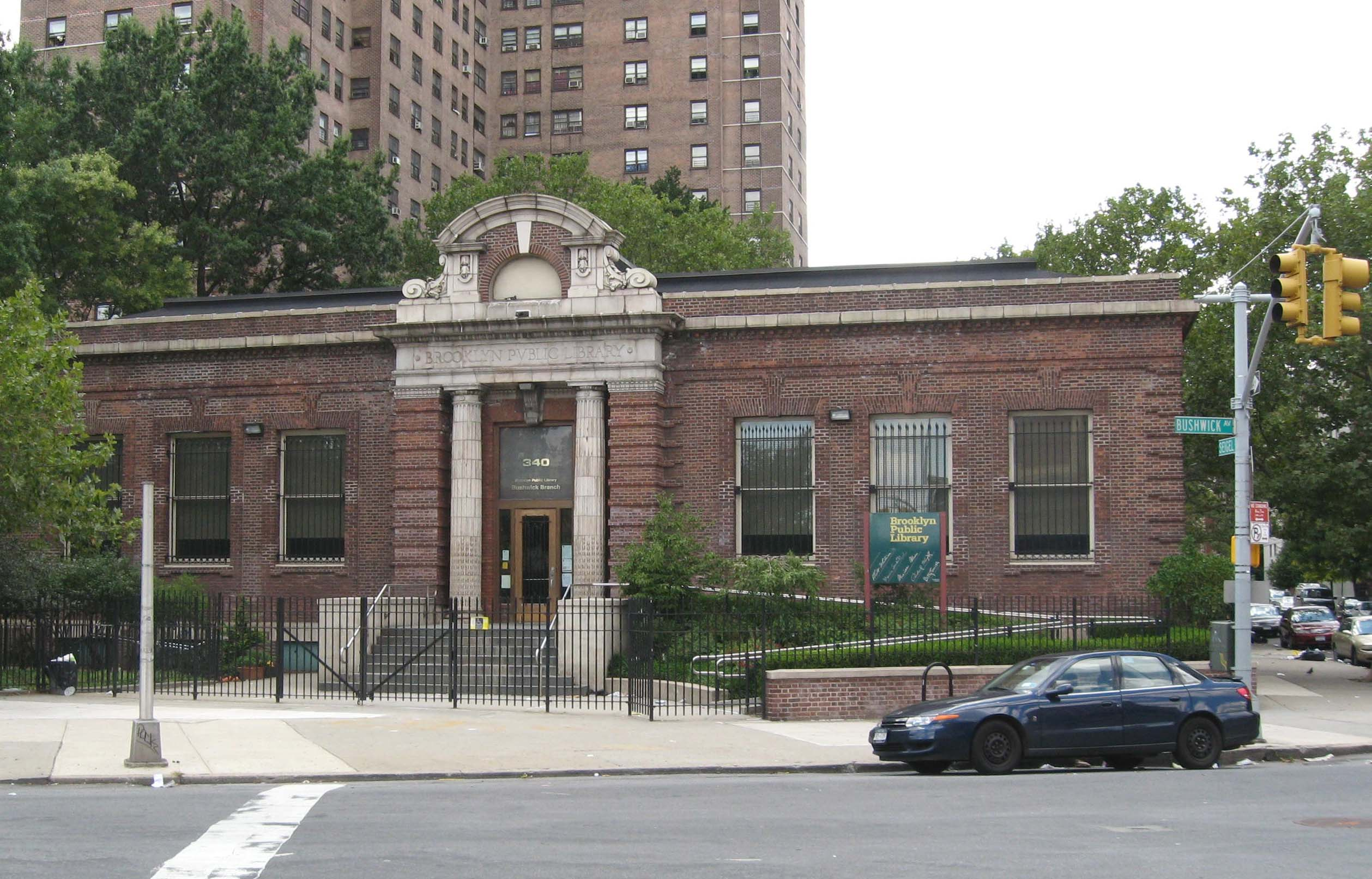
Bushwick Library in Brooklyn in 1908

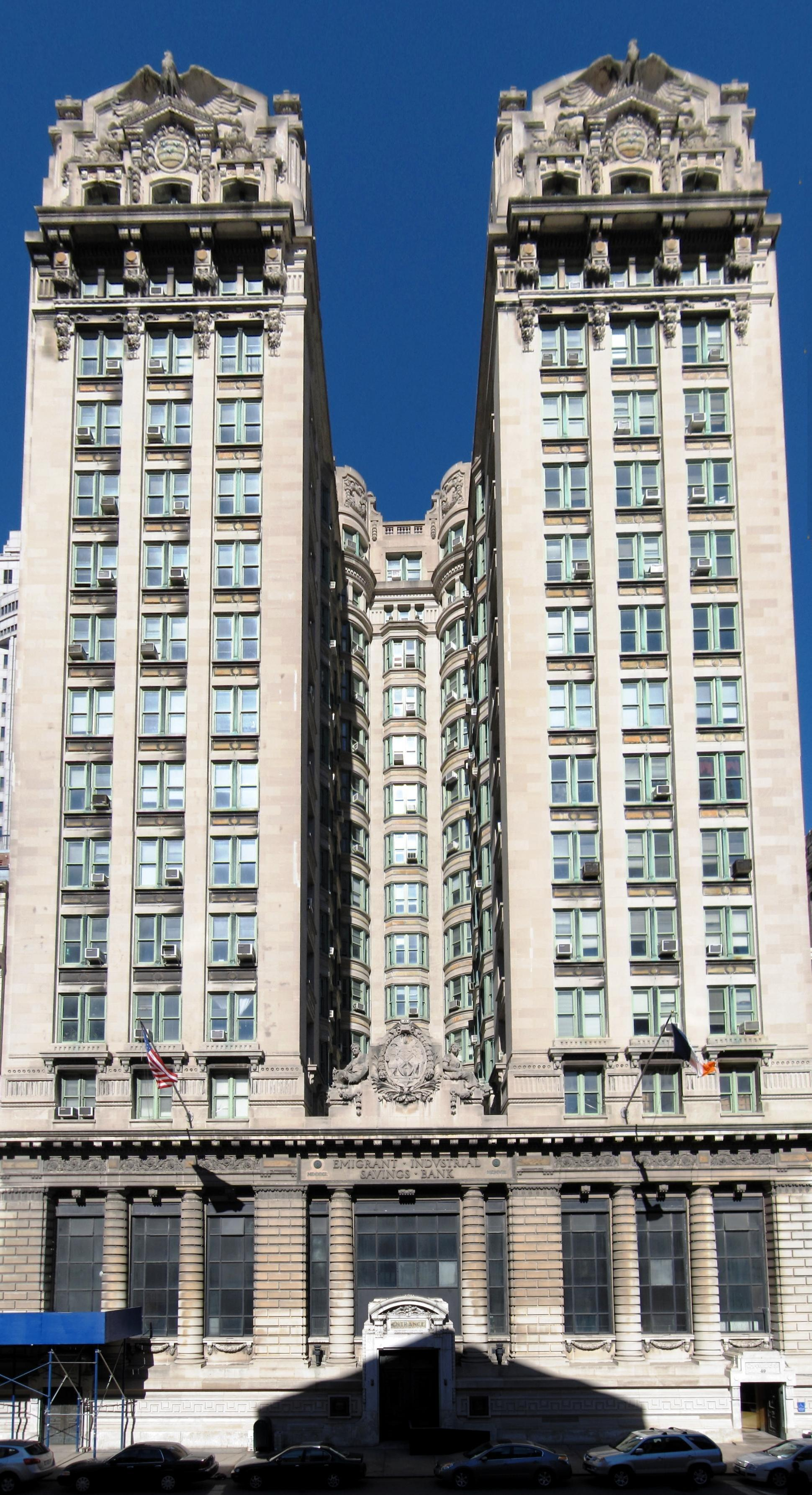
49 Chambers in Manhattan in 1908

Raymond F. Almirall (1869–1939) was an American architect of the Beaux-Arts period, practicing in New York City.

== Early life and education ==
Almirall was born in New York City, in 1869. He studied architecture at Cornell University and at the École des Beaux-Arts in Paris.

== Career ==
In 1896, he established an architectural firm in New York City with John W. Ingle, Ingle & Almirall. The firm lasted until the end of 1900, when Almirall opened an independent office. In the mid-teens, Almirall made Philip Alain Cusachs a member of his new firm, Almirall & Cusachs, which lasted into the 1920s.

Almirall's work often incorporated the latest architectural techniques including structural steel, reinforced cement and reinforced concrete.

In 1909, Almirall designed what might have been his masterpiece, the Beaux-Arts classical style Brooklyn Central Library which was expected to be a major example of the City Beautiful architectural style in that city. But money was short, and construction did not begin for several years. Soon after, money ran out and only the west wing wall was actually built. In 1937, the project was renewed and the New York firm of Githens & Keally was hired to redesign the building in the Modern Classical style. Almirall’s original scheme was abandoned in favor of the new one and the redesigned library was completed in 1941.

Almirall also designed several large churches for the Roman Catholic Diocese of Brooklyn. One of these, the Mortuary Chapel at Calvary Cemetery, Long Island City, New York, was described at the time of its construction as ‘’the Most Remarkable Mortuary Chapel in America’’.

He was one of the very few American architects of his day to design a Cathedral in a foreign country. His byzantine styled Holy Trinity Cathedral in Kingston, Jamaica, which contains a "broad, clearly articulated facade" and a large concrete dome. In his book Hagia Sophia, 1850-1950: Holy Wisdom Modern Monument, author Robert S. Nelson compares the Cathedral to the Hagia Sophia.

Almirall also designed most of the buildings for the Seaview Hospital in Staten Island, New York, which at the time of its construction was the largest tuberculosis hospital in the world where many of the successful treatments for this disease were to be created. Today this hospital is a ruin.

== Architectural works ==
=== Ingle & Almirall, 1896-1900 ===
- 1897 - Binghamton Municipal Building, 79 Collier St, Binghamton, New York
- 1897 - St. Dominic R. C. Church, 93 Anstice St, Oyster Bay, New York
- 1898 - Binghamton Savings Bank Building, 99 Collier St, Binghamton, New York
- 1898 - St. Patrick R. C. Church, 39-38 29th St, Long Island City, New York
- 1899 - R. C. Church of Our Lady of Sorrows, 104-11 37th Ave, Corona, Queens, New York
- 1899 - St. Patrick R. C. Church, 235 Glen St, Glen Cove, New York
- 1900 - R. C. Church of the Guardian Angel, 2978 Ocean Pkwy, Brooklyn, New York

=== Raymond F. Almirall, 1901-c.1915 ===
- 1903 - Pacific Library, 25 4th Ave, Brooklyn, New York
- 1904 - Chi Psi Lodge, 200 Church St, Middletown, Connecticut
  - Burned in 1912.
- 1905 - Decauville Garage, 1743-1745 Broadway, New York, New York
  - Demolished.
- 1905 - Municipal Lodging House, 432-438 E 25th St, New York, New York
  - An early version of the modern homeless shelter. Demolished.
- 1905 - Seaview Hospital, 460 Brielle Ave, Staten Island, New York
- 1905 - St. Michael's R. C. Church, 352 42nd St, Brooklyn, New York
- 1906 - Fordham Hospital, Southern Blvd, Bronx, New York
  - Demolished.
- 1906 - Park Slope Library, 431 6th Ave, Brooklyn, New York
- 1906 - Public Bath No. 7, 227 4th Ave, Brooklyn, New York
- 1908 - Bushwick Library, 340 Bushwick Ave, Brooklyn, New York
- 1908 - 49 Chambers (Emigrant Industrial Savings Bank Building), 49–51 Chambers St, New York, New York
- 1908 - R. C. Cathedral of the Holy Trinity, North St, Kingston, Jamaica
- 1910 - Chapin Home for the Aged, 16501 Chapin Pkwy, Jamaica, New York
  - Demolished.
- 1913 - Eastern Parkway Library, 1044 Eastern Pkwy, Brooklyn, New York
- 1915 - R. C. Church of the Nativity, 20 Madison St, Brooklyn, New York

=== Almirall & Cusachs, from c.1916 ===
- 1916 - Notre Dame Home for the Aged, 660 183rd Ave, Bronx, New York
- 1917 - Central Brooklyn Public Library, 10 Grand Army Plaza, Brooklyn, New York
  - Partially built and then renovated.
- 1920 - R. C. Church of the Nativity (Addition), 20 Madison St, Brooklyn, New York
- 1926 - 386 Park Ave S, New York, New York
