= Trinity Memorial Church =

Trinity Memorial Church may refer to:

- Trinity Memorial Church (Denver, Colorado)
- Trinity Memorial Church (Binghamton, New York)
