= George Bain Cummings =

American architect (1890–1974)

- Born: February 11, 1890; New Ipswich, New Hampshire
- Died: March 28, 1974 (aged 84); Binghamton, New York
- Occupation: Architect

The Federal Building and United States Courthouse in Binghamton, designed by Conrad & Cummings and completed in 1935

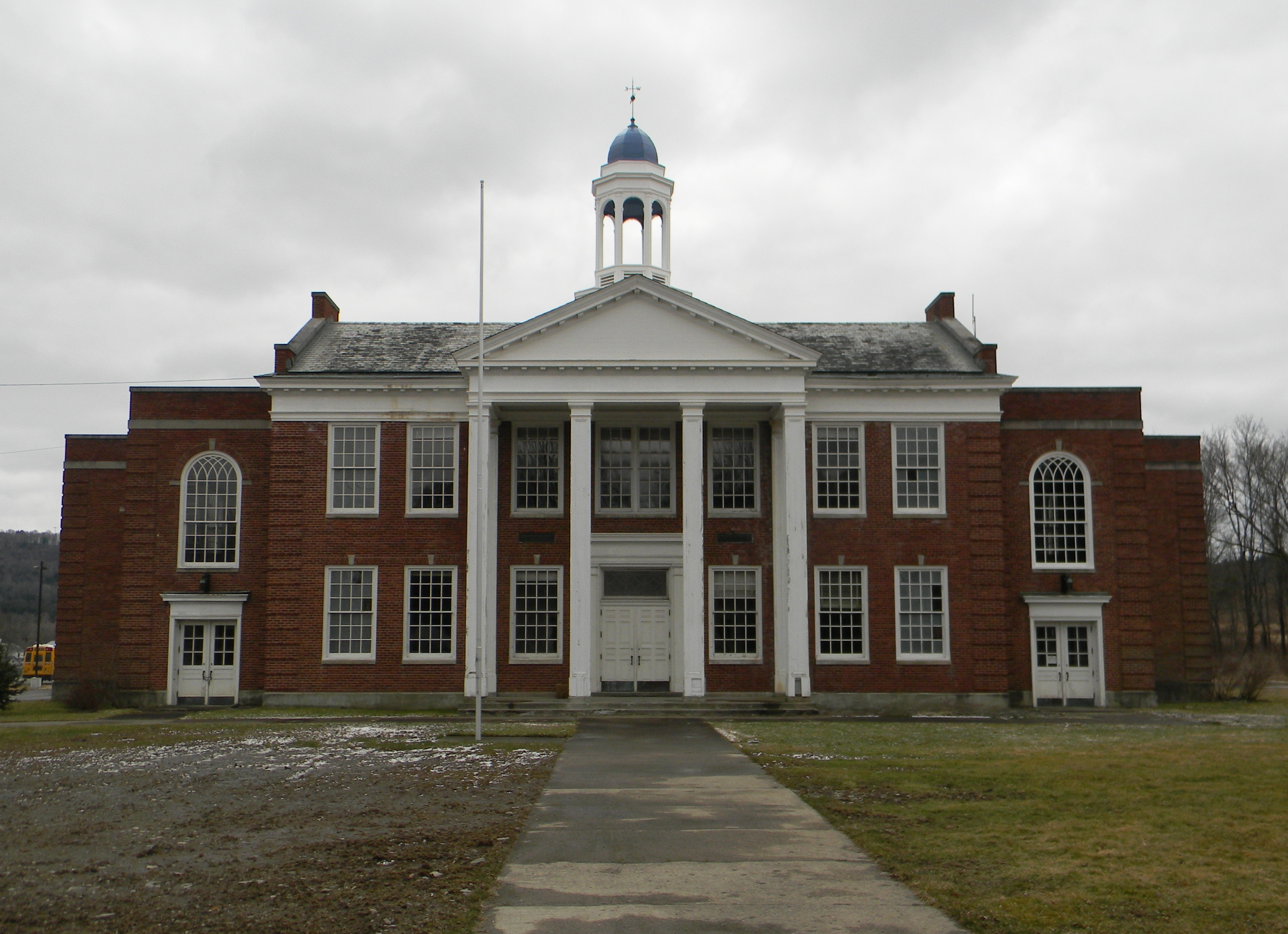
The Maine Central School, completed in 1940

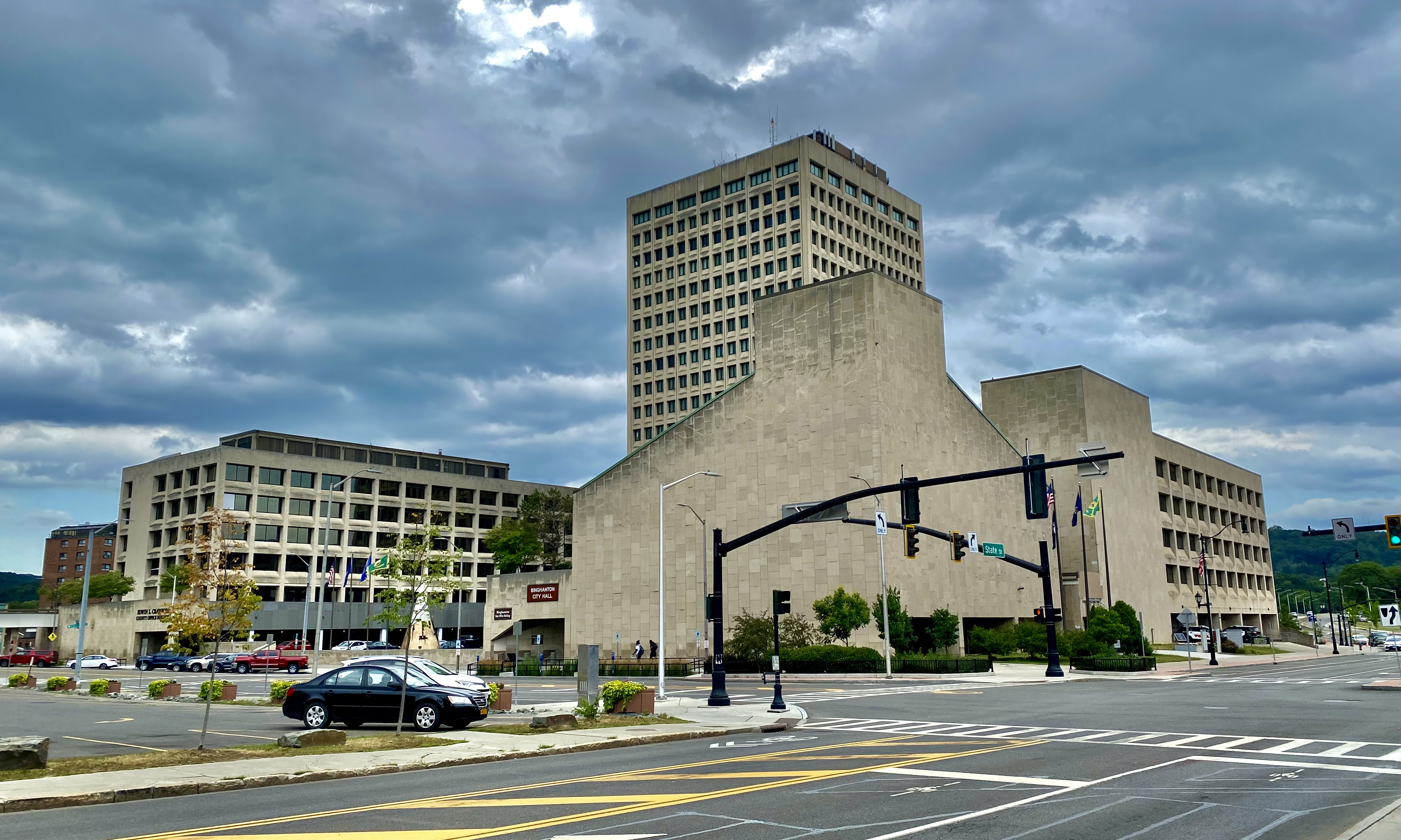
Government Plaza in Binghamton, designed by Cummings & Pash and Lacey & Lucas and completed in 1972

George Bain Cummings FAIA (1890–1974) was an American architect in practice in Binghamton, New York, from 1920 until 1961. From 1955 to 1956 he was president of the American Institute of Architects.

== Life and career ==
George Bain Cummings was born February 11, 1890, in New Ipswich, New Hampshire, to John Wyman Cummings and Harriet (Boyce) Cummings. He was raised in Brooklyn, where he attended the public schools, graduating from Boys High School in 1907. He was educated at Cornell University, graduating in 1912. He worked for Carrère & Hastings in New York City until the United States entered World War I, when he enlisted in the United States Army Air Service. He spent the war in France, and was discharged in 1919. After his return to New York City he worked for Trowbridge & Ackerman before moving to Binghamton in 1920, where he joined the firm of Lacey & Schenck, which was renamed Lacey, Schenck & Cummings. In 1921 the partnership was dissolved, and Cummings succeeded to the practice. In 1923 he formed a new partnership with Fred Leonard Starbuck, known as Cummings & Starbuck. When Starbuck moved to Florida in 1926 this was dissolved, and Cummings merged his practice with that of architect Charles H. Conrad to form the new firm of Conrad & Cummings. Conrad and Cummings worked together for 35 years. Cummings retired in 1961, followed by Conrad in 1967. Thereafter the firm was directed by Cummings' son, John Butler Cummings, an employee since 1949, with the elder Cummings as consultant. In 1970 the younger Cummings reorganized the office as Cummings & Pash in association with George Harrison Pash, an employee since 1963. After the younger Cummings' retirement in 1987, the firm became Cummings, Pash & Hadsell, and was finally dissolved in 1998.

Cummings joined the American Institute of Architects in 1921 as a member of the Central New York chapter. He served as chapter president and on several national committees. In 1948 he was elected a Fellow, the organization's highest membership honor. In 1953 he was elected to two consecutive terms as secretary, and in 1955 was elected president, succeeding Clair W. Ditchy. He served a single one-year term, and did not stand for reelection. He remained active after his term of office, and from 1958 to 1962 was a member of the jury of the College of Fellows.

== Personal life and death ==
In 1912 Cummings was married to Aura Marie Butler of Ithaca, New York. They had three children, including John Butler Cummings, who would be associated in business with his father. Cummings died March 28, 1974, in Binghamton.

== Architectural works ==
- Goodwill Theatre, 36 Willow St, Johnson City, New York (1920, NRHP 2000)
- Federal Building and United States Courthouse, 15 Henry St, Binghamton, New York (1933–35, NRHP 2020)
- First Church of Christ, Scientist (former), 17 Front St, Binghamton, New York (1938–39)
- Maine Central School, 35 Church St, Maine, New York (1940, NRHP 1998)
- Trinity Memorial Church parish house, 44 Main St, Binghamton, New York (1948–49, NRHP 1998)
- Terminal, Greater Binghamton Airport, Johnson City, New York (1952)
- Clayton Avenue Elementary School, 209 Clayton Ave, Vestal, New York (1954)
- MacArthur Elementary School, 1123 Vestal Ave, Binghamton, New York (1960–62, demolished)
- Columbian Financial Group headquarters, 4704 Vestal Pkwy E, Vestal, New York (1966)
- Government Plaza, (Note: Designed by Cummings & Pash with George Bain Cummings as consulting architect and Lacey & Lucas as architects for the county building.) State St, Binghamton, New York (1970–72)
