= St. Michael's Church (Brooklyn) =

St. Michael's Catholic Church
- The Church of St. Michael
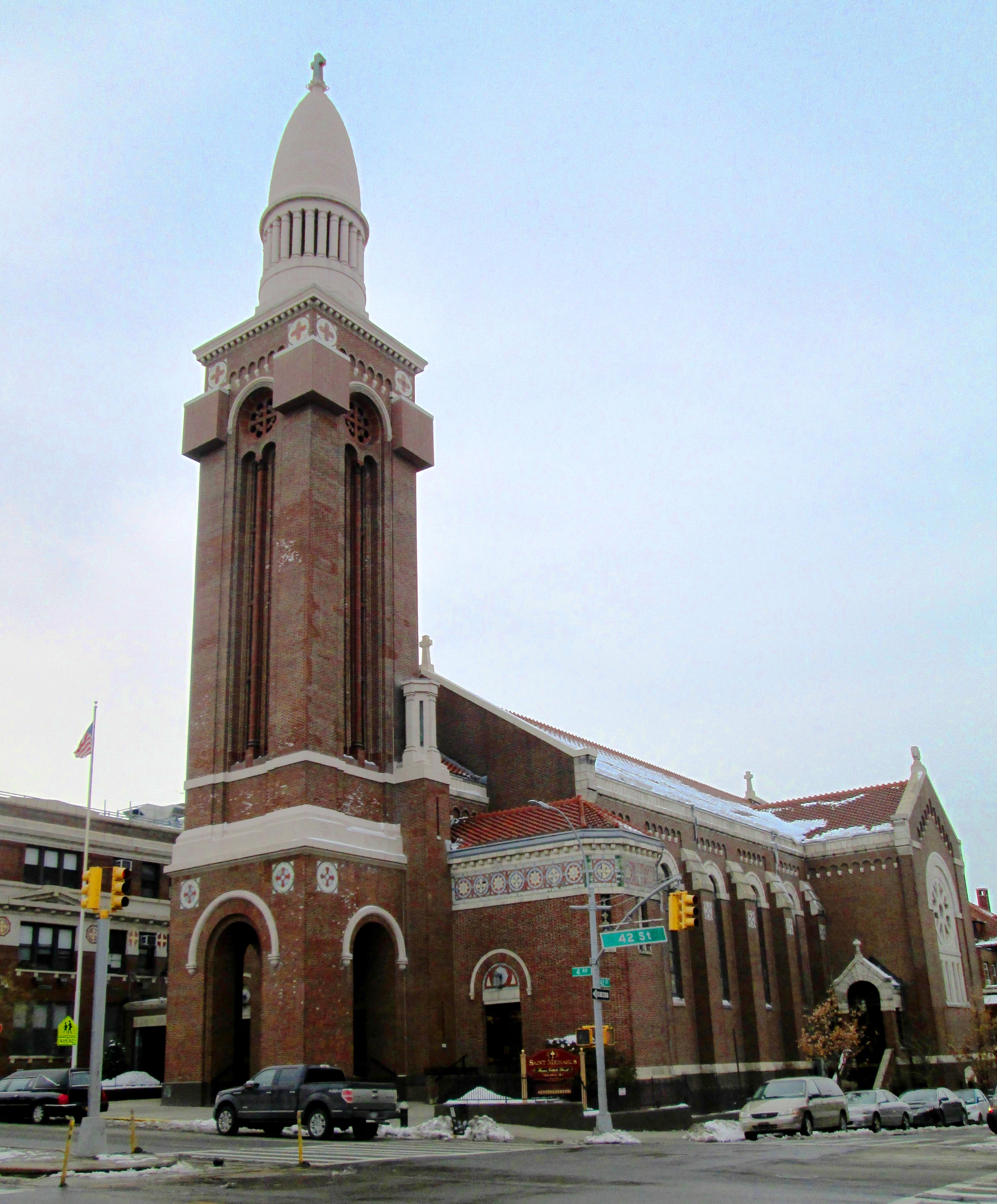
- St Michael's Church, 2015
- St. Michael's Catholic Church
- 40.65132°N 74.00890°W
- Address: 352 42nd Street at Fourth Avenue, Sunset Park, Brooklyn, New York City
- Country: United States
- Denomination: Roman Catholic
- Website: stmichaelssunsetpark.com

History
- Status: Church
- Founded: 1870
- Dedication: Saint Michael

Architecture
- Functional status: Active
- Architect: Raymond F. Almirall
- Architectural type: Church
- Style: Romanesque Revival; Byzantine Revival
- Completed: 1905

Administration
- Diocese: Brooklyn

St Michael's Catholic Church, officially the Church of St. Michael, is a Roman Catholic parish church under the authority of the Diocese of Brooklyn, located at 352 42nd Street at Fourth Avenue in the [Bay Ridge neighborhood now considered Sunset Park, Brooklyn, New York City.

Before the founding of St. Michael's parish in 1870, Catholics in the area had to travel to mass at either St. John the Evangelist at 21st St. or St. Patrick's in Fort Hamilton. The first pastor was Rev. Michael J. Hickey.

The current church was built 1905, and was designed by noted church architect Raymond F. Almirall. The exterior is in early Romanesque. Often referred to as Brooklyn's own "Sacré-Cœur", the domed tower once was the second tallest building in Brooklyn after the Williamsburg Savings Bank Tower, until a late 2000s high rise development claimed that title.

St. Michael's parochial school opened in 1886; it closed in 2005.

== In popular culture ==
The comedy film Heaven Help Us (1985) was filmed in the neighborhood, using external and internal shots of the church and the now closed St. Michael's Parish School as the fictional St. Basil's Church and St. Basil's School, run by the factual Order of St. Basil.
