= John T. Whitmore House =

Historic house in New York, United States

- U.S. National Register of Historic Places
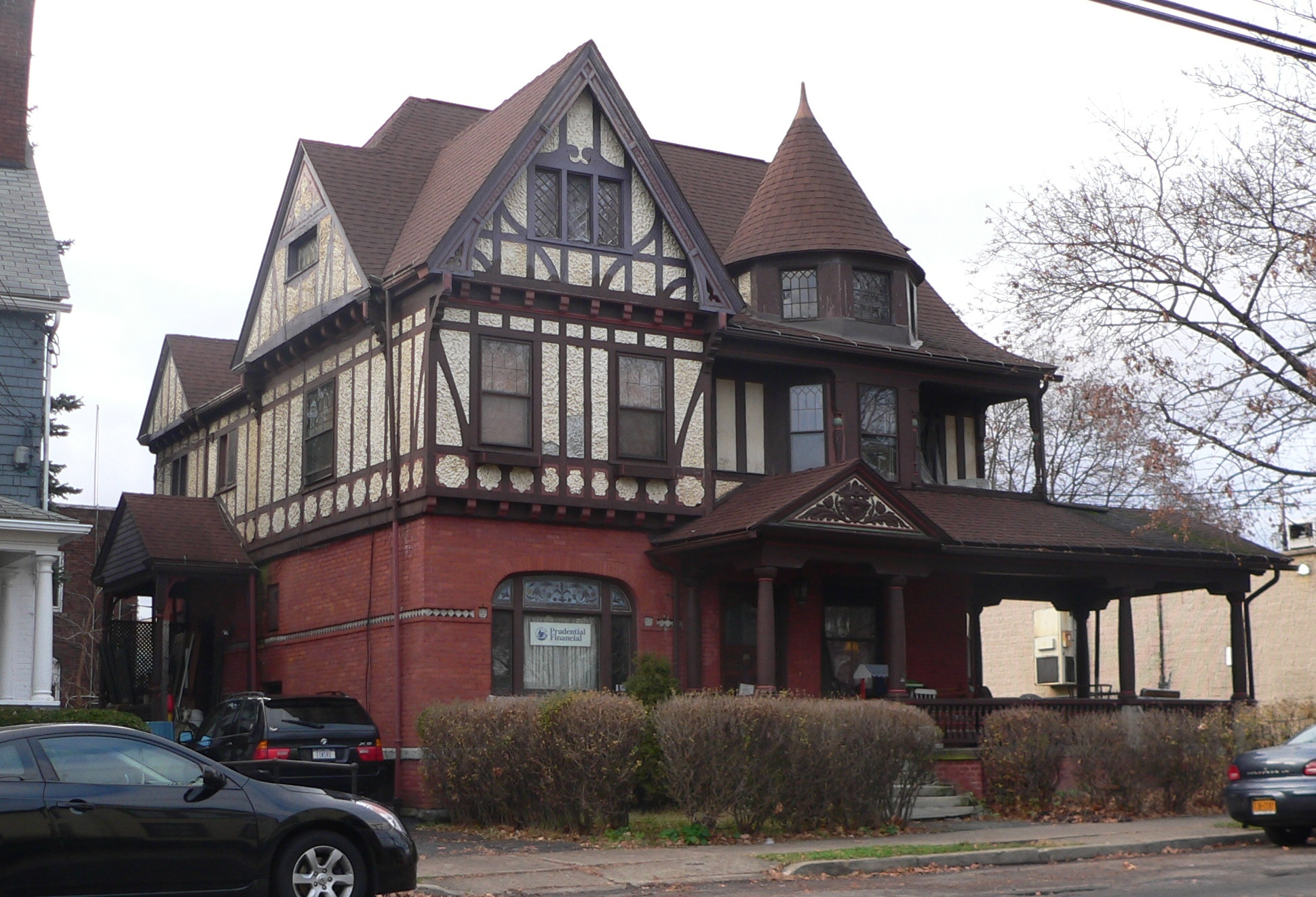
- Seen from Murray Street

- Location within New York Location within the United States
- Location: 111 Murray St., Binghamton, New York
- Coordinates: 42°5′56″N 75°55′17.5″W
- Area: less than one acre
- Built: 1888
- Architectural style: Queen Anne
- NRHP reference No.: 86001653
- Added to NRHP: August 14, 1986

John T. Whitmore House is a historic home located at Binghamton in Broome County, New York. It is a Queen Anne–style dwelling constructed in 1888. It is a 2 1/2-story frame residence with irregular massing and brick, half timber, and stucco and shingle exterior surfaces.

It was listed on the National Register of Historic Places in 1986.
