= Building at 171–177 Clinton Street =

Historic commercial building in New York, United States

- U.S. National Register of Historic Places
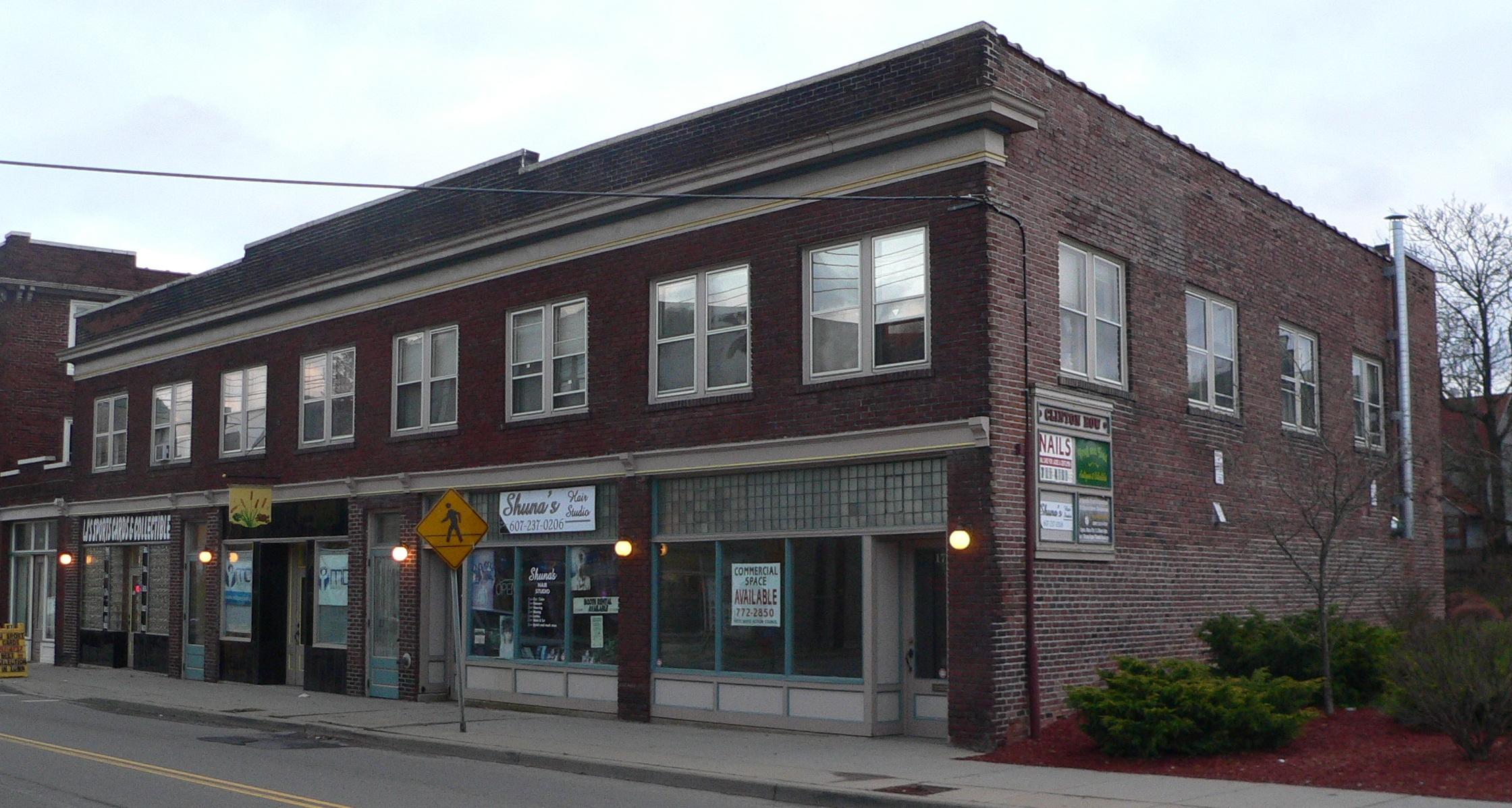

- Location within New York Location within the United States
- Location: 171–177 Clinton St., Binghamton, New York
- Coordinates: 42°6′20″N 75°55′36″W
- Area: less than one acre
- Built: 1920
- Architectural style: Late 19th And Early 20th Century American Movements
- NRHP reference No.: 02001641
- Added to NRHP: December 31, 2002

The Building at 171–177 Clinton Street, also known as Bruun and Co. and Afga Ansco, No. 99, is a historic commercial building located at Binghamton in Broome County, New York. It is a two-story, two part brick commercial block built in 1920. The first floor is divided into four storefronts and the second floor contains the remnants of offices and apartments. The building was purchased in the 1940s by General Aniline & Film and housed a number of GAF offices and facilities.

It was listed on the National Register of Historic Places in 2002.
