= Edward Rose House =

- U.S. National Register of Historic Places
- Location within Alabama Location within the United States
- Location: 325 2nd Ave., NW., Fayette, Alabama
- Coordinates: 33°41′17″N 87°50′2″W
- Area: 4.1 acres (1.7 ha)
- Built: 1898
- Built by: Rose, Edward
- Architectural style: Queen Anne
- NRHP reference No.: 95001020
- Added to NRHP: August 22, 1995

The Edward Rose House in Fayette, Alabama, United States, is a Queen Anne-style house which was built in 1898. Located at 325 2nd Avenue Northwest, it has also been known as the Rose House Inn. It was listed on the National Register of Historic Places in 1995.

It is a one-and-a-half-story house with a wraparound porch with lace-like brackets. It has a hexagonal tower with a bell-shaped roof.

In a renovation of the house, the original 14-foot ceilings were restored by removal of a dropped ceiling.
