= Maine Central School =

- U.S. National Register of Historic Places
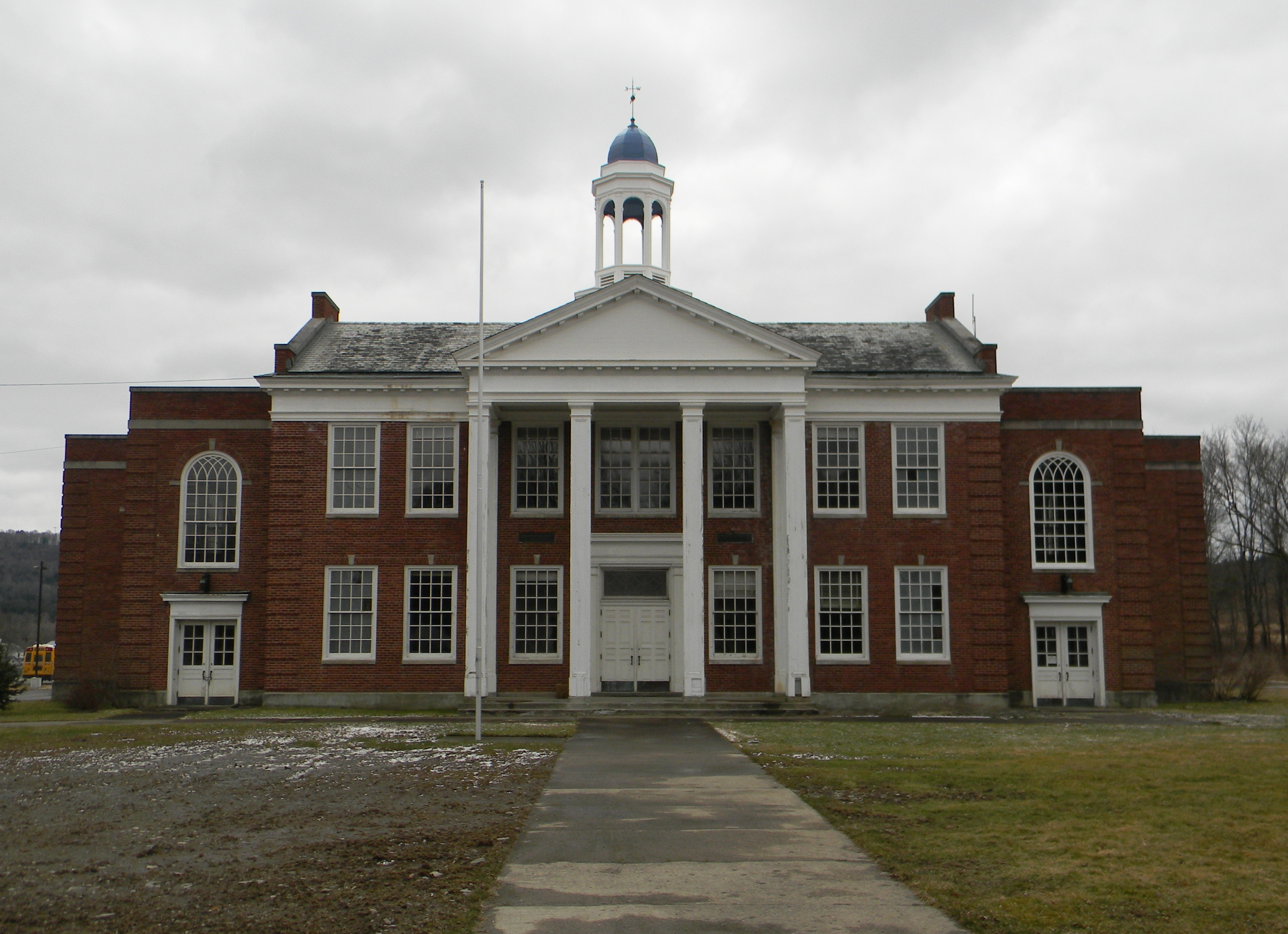
- Maine Central School, February 2012

- Location within New York Location within the United States
- Location: Church St., Maine, New York
- Coordinates: 42°11′38″N 76°03′50″W
- Area: 2.5 acres (1.0 ha)
- Built: 1940
- Architect: George Bain Cummings
- Architectural style: Colonial Revival
- NRHP reference No.: 97001619
- Added to NRHP: January 7, 1998

Maine Central School, also known as J. Ralph Ingalls School, is an historic school building located at Maine in Broome County, New York.

It was built in 1940 and is a substantial two-story, nearly square building. It has a steel frame structural system, clad in red brick over concrete block and limestone trim.

It features a low hipped roof crowned by a multi-stage cupola with a Chippendale-inspired balustrade in the Colonial Revival style. The main block is organized around a center entrance within a monumental two-story, three-bay projecting wooden portico.

The school was built in part with funds provided by the PWA—Public Works Administration.

It was listed on the National Register of Historic Places in 1998.
