= Riverside Cemetery (Endicott, New York) =

Historic cemetery in New York, United States

- U.S. National Register of Historic Places
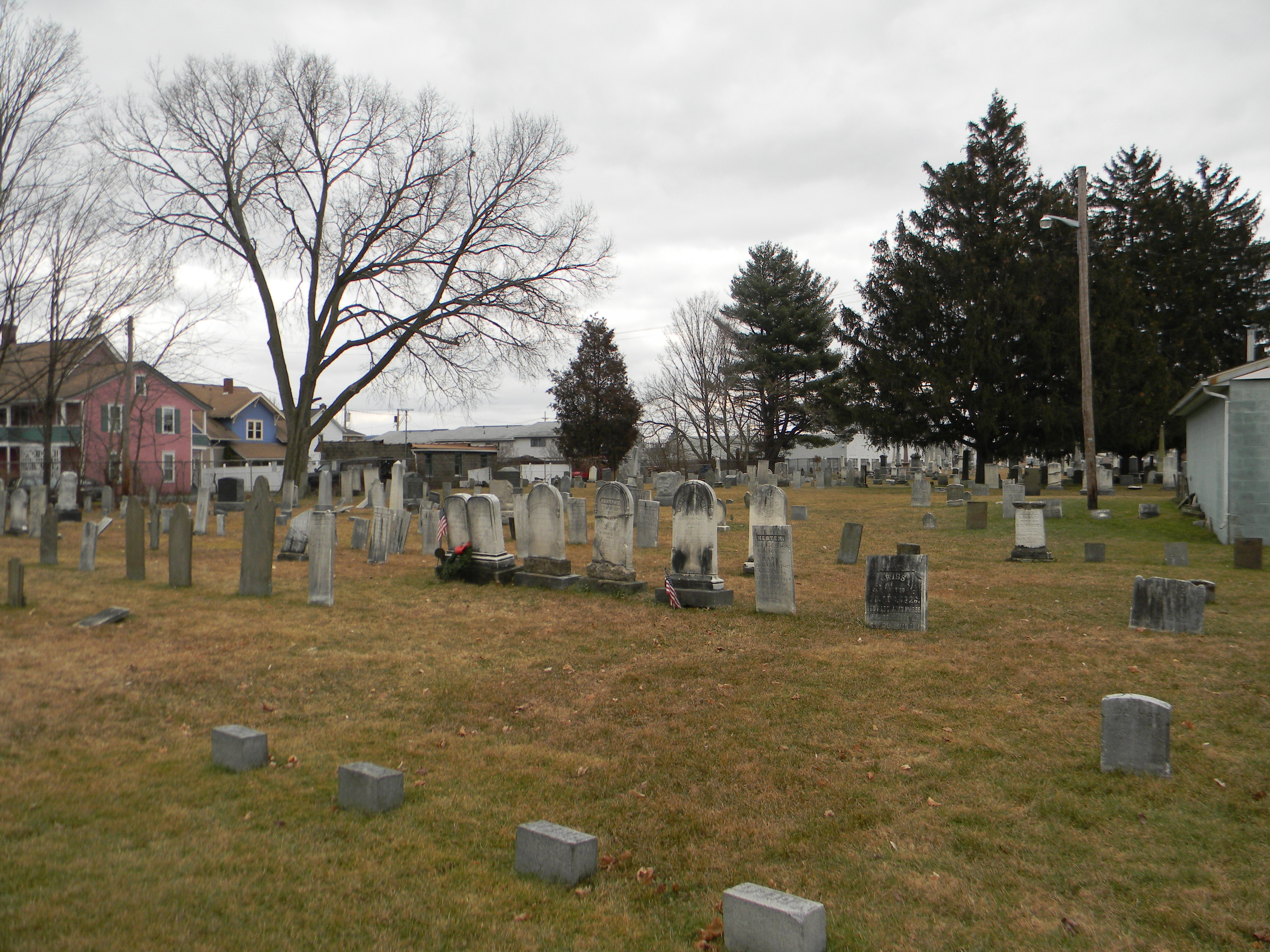
- The oldest section of Riverside Cemetery, February 2012

- Location within New York Location within the United States
- Location: 400 Vestal Ave., Endicott, New York
- Coordinates: 42°5′37″N 76°3′31″W
- Area: 6 acres (2.4 ha)
- Built: 1791
- NRHP reference No.: 04000824
- Added to NRHP: August 11, 2004

Riverside Cemetery (established 1791) is a cemetery set in the "Old Union" district of Endicott, New York, owned and operated by The Union Presbyterian Church. Located at 400 Vestal Avenue, the cemetery has historical significance as the burial place of Joshua and John Mersereau, who fought with George Washington in the Revolutionary War.

It was listed on the National Register of Historic Places in 2004.

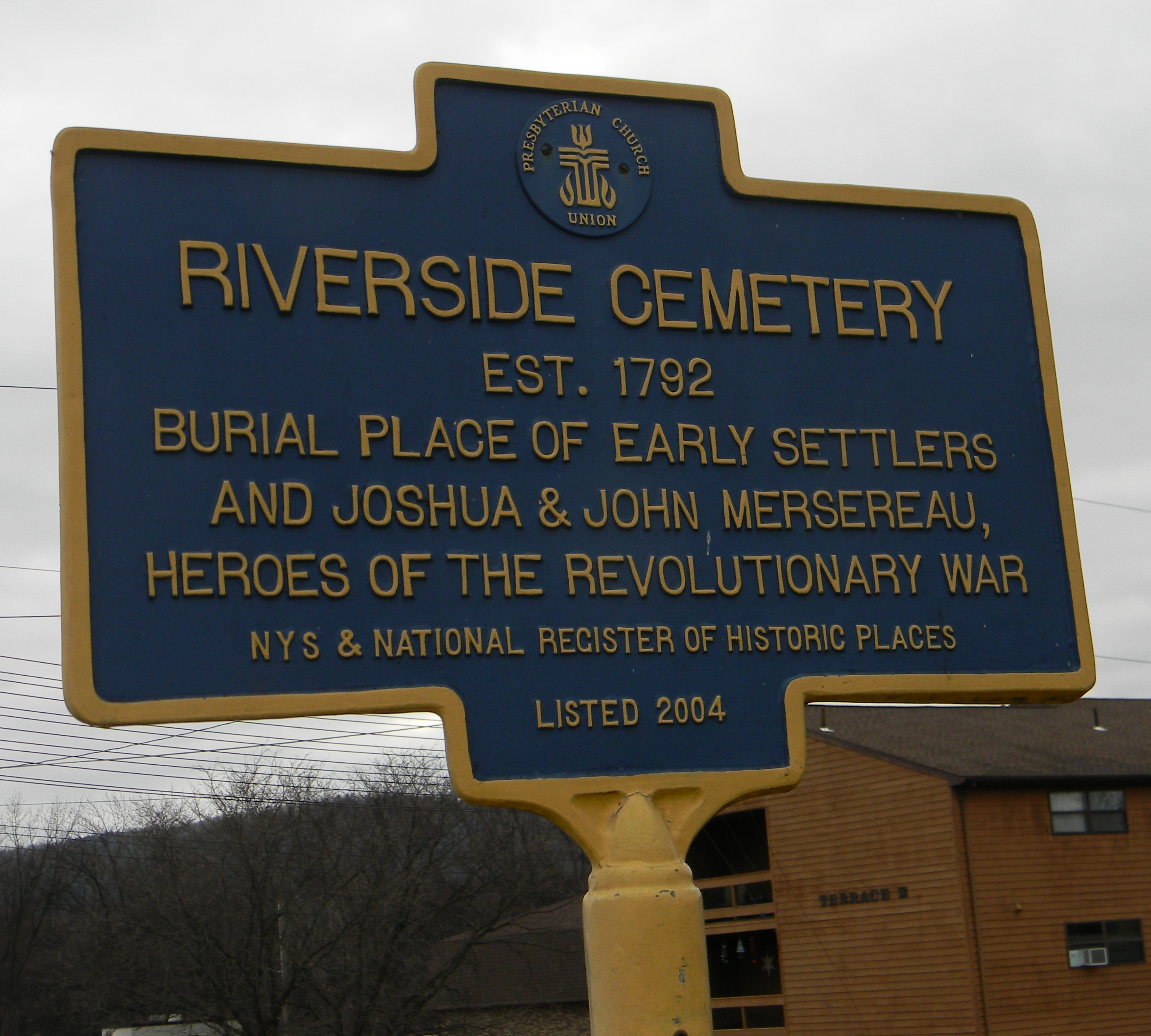
NRHP Sign located in front of Riverside Cemetery
