= Drovers Inn and Round Family Residence =

Historic house in New York, United States

- U.S. National Register of Historic Places
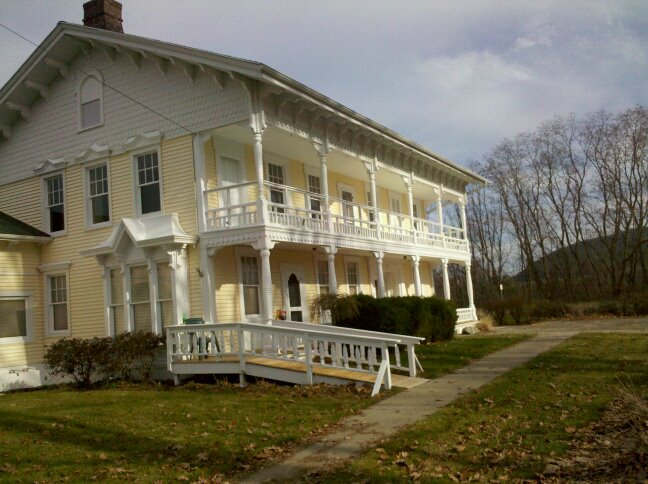
- Drover's Inn, December 2011

- Location within New York Location within the United States
- Location: 2 Pumphouse Rd. and 301 Main St., Vestal, New York
- Coordinates: 42°5′22.78″N 76°3′15.87″W
- Area: 5 acres (2.0 ha)
- Built: 1844
- Architect: Baty, Ransom, Jr.; Lacey, Truman J.
- Architectural style: Greek Revival, Victorian
- NRHP reference No.: 10000222
- Added to NRHP: April 26, 2010

Drovers Inn and Round Family Residence consists of an historic home and an historic inn located at Vestal in Broome County, New York. The Drovers Inn was built about 1844 and the Rounds Family Residence was built 1895–1912. The inn is a 2 1/2-story wood-frame Greek Revival structure with an overlay of elaborate Victorian-era decoration added about 1880. The residence was built in 1895 and features an engaged tower with a bell cast roof added in 1912.

It was listed on the National Register of Historic Places in 2010.
