= Lithuanian National Association Hall =

- U.S. National Register of Historic Places
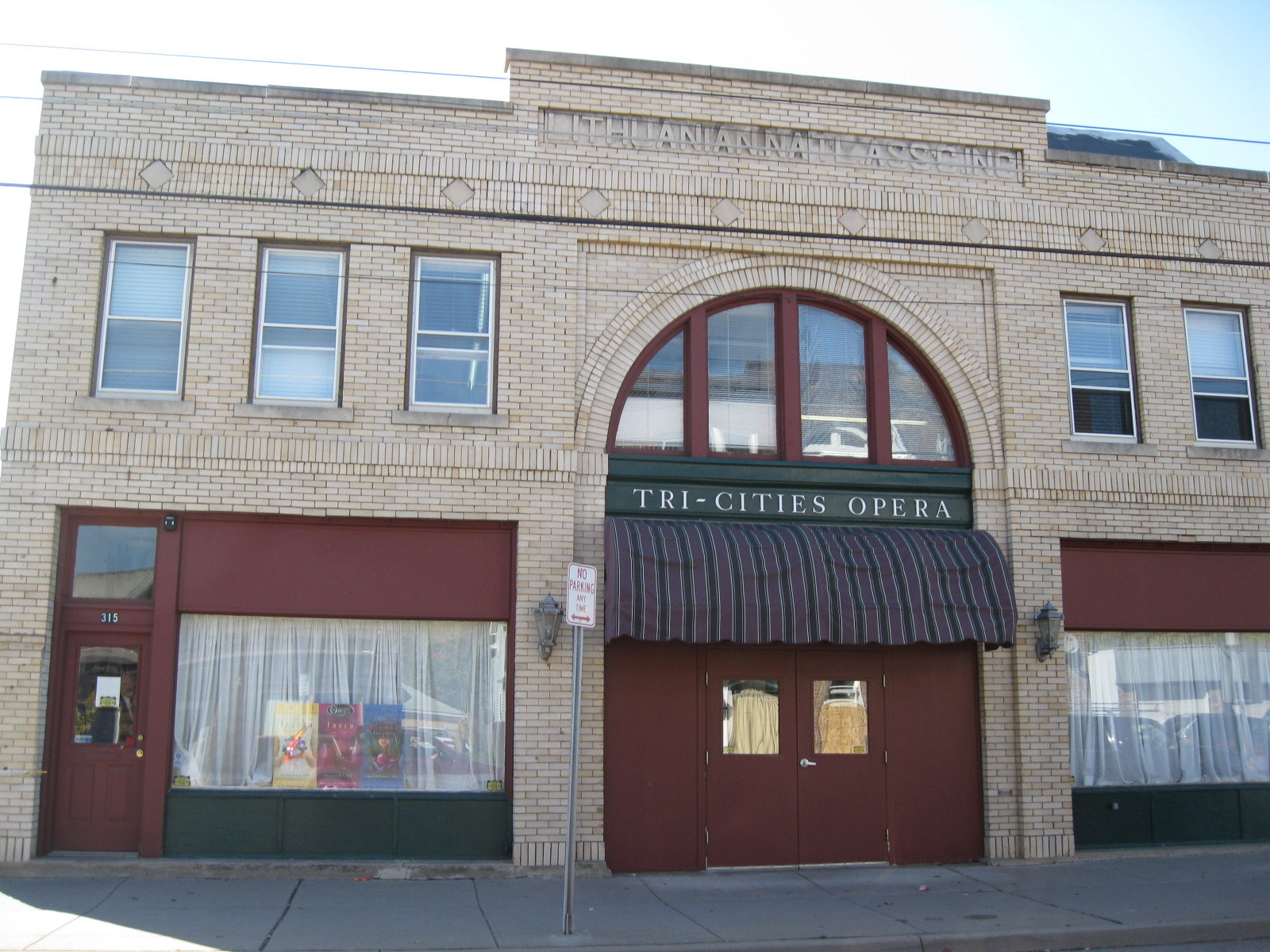
- Lithuanian National Association Hall, October 2009

- Location within New York Location within the United States
- Location: 315 Clinton St., Binghamton, New York
- Coordinates: 42°06′36″N 75°56′12″W
- Area: 0.5 acres (0.20 ha)
- Built: 1917
- NRHP reference No.: 15000673
- Added to NRHP: September 29, 2015

Lithuanian National Association Hall, also known as the Tri-Cities Opera, is a historic clubhouse located at Binghamton, Broome County, New York. It was built in 1917, is a two-story, steel and timber frame building with a flat roof, clad in yellow brick. It features a broad central Romanesque arch on the second floor. The building measures approximately 50 feet wide by approximately 115 feet deep. The building housed the Lithuanian National Association until 1964, when it was sold to the Tri-Cities Opera.

It was listed on the National Register of Historic Places in 2015.
