= St. Dominic Roman Catholic Church (Oyster Bay, New York) =

Church in New York, USA

Coordinates: 40°52′7.01″N 73°31′40.38″W

The Roman Catholic Church of St. Dominic
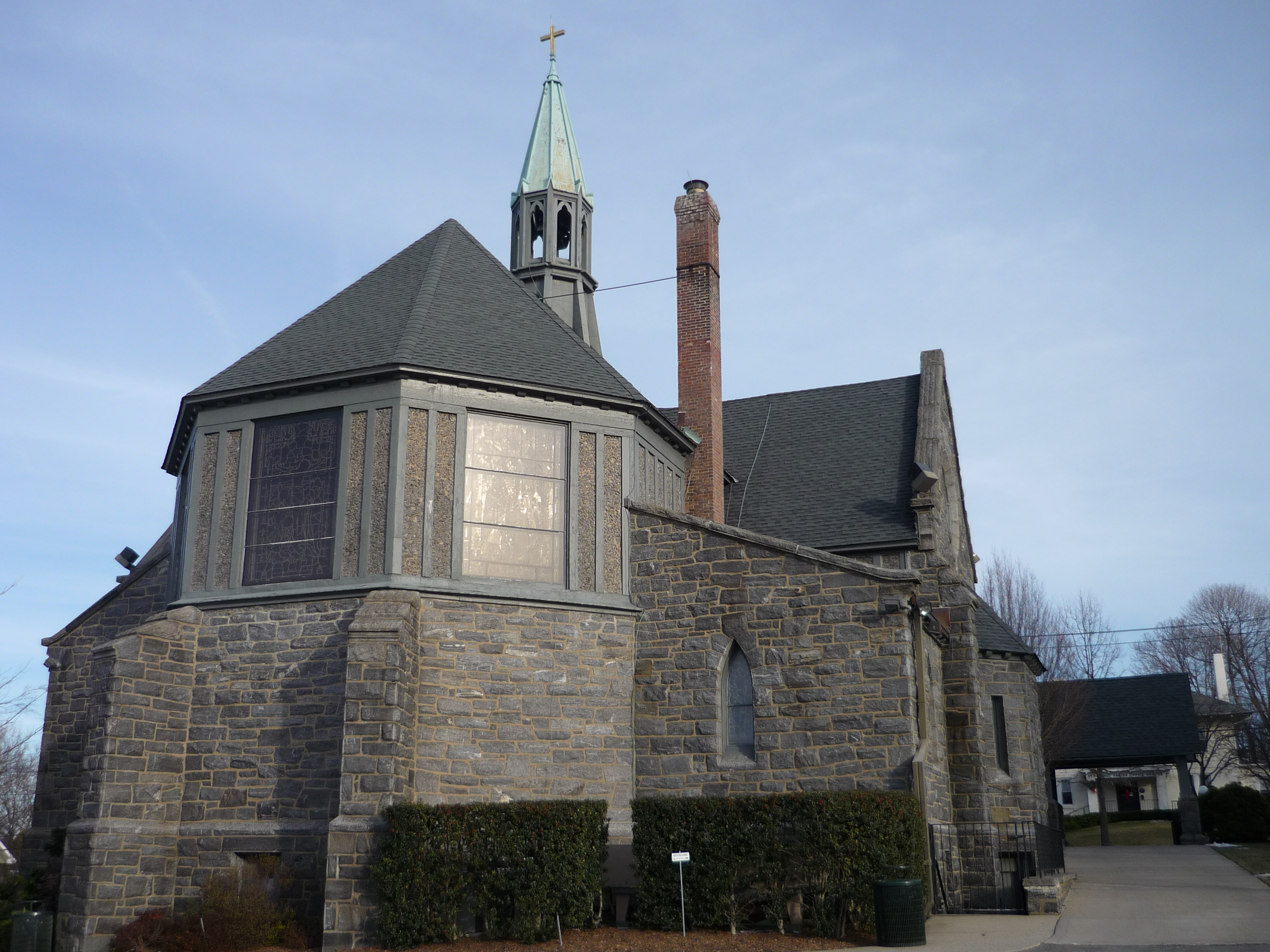
- Photo of St. Dominic's Chapel, 2009
- Interactive map of the The Roman Catholic Church of St. Dominic area

General information
- Location: Oyster Bay, New York,, United States of America
- Construction started: 1968 (for modern church)
- Completed: November 1897 (for chapel)
- Client: Originally Roman Catholic Diocese of Brooklyn (now constituent in the Roman Catholic Diocese of Rockville Centre)

Technical details
- Structural system: Masonry granite

The Church of St. Dominic is a Roman Catholic parish church in the Roman Catholic Diocese of Rockville Centre, in Oyster Bay, New York. The parish was founded in the late nineteenth century.

== History ==
This Gothic style granite building was first dedicated on Thanksgiving Day in 1897. The first resident Pastor of the Oyster Bay Catholic congregation, Rev. John Belford, had much to celebrate on Thanksgiving Day in 1897. It was on that day that he dedicated the completion of this beautiful gothic style granite church. It would seat almost twice as many parishioners as their first church building, a wood-frame structure which still exists as a private house on Summit Street. The new church had been finished in under a year, with a ground breaking in May and a November dedication. Construction had been no easy task, however; besides the many loads of giant timbers needed for the 40-foot vaulted ceiling, huge granite blocks quarried in Greenwich, Connecticut, had to be transported by barge across Long Island Sound and then hauled by horse drawn sled up the hill. This site, the highest in Oyster Bay, looked down on the village and the Sound, and when the golden cross was put atop the 33-foot spire, it was said that on a clear day you could see it shining from the shores of Connecticut.

The original porte cochere affords a covered entrance to the chapel, and inside one can still listen to the original pipe organ. It is one of only three of its kind in the United States, an American-made Hook and Hastings Opus Tracker organ, built in 1901. The gothic interior features dark wood beams which in the 1950s were elaborately hand painted and accented with gold. Intricate stained glass, depicting biblical scenes, graces the windows, while floral art nouveau panels are featured in the entryway. The original altar is inlaid with mother of pearl tiles and jewel-like glass works which although not signed, are believed by many to have been made by Louis Comfort Tiffany, whose estate, Laurelton Hall was once in Oyster Bay Cove. The large stained glass windows on the front of the chapel facing the street had to be replaced after they were blown out by the Great New England Hurricane of 1938.

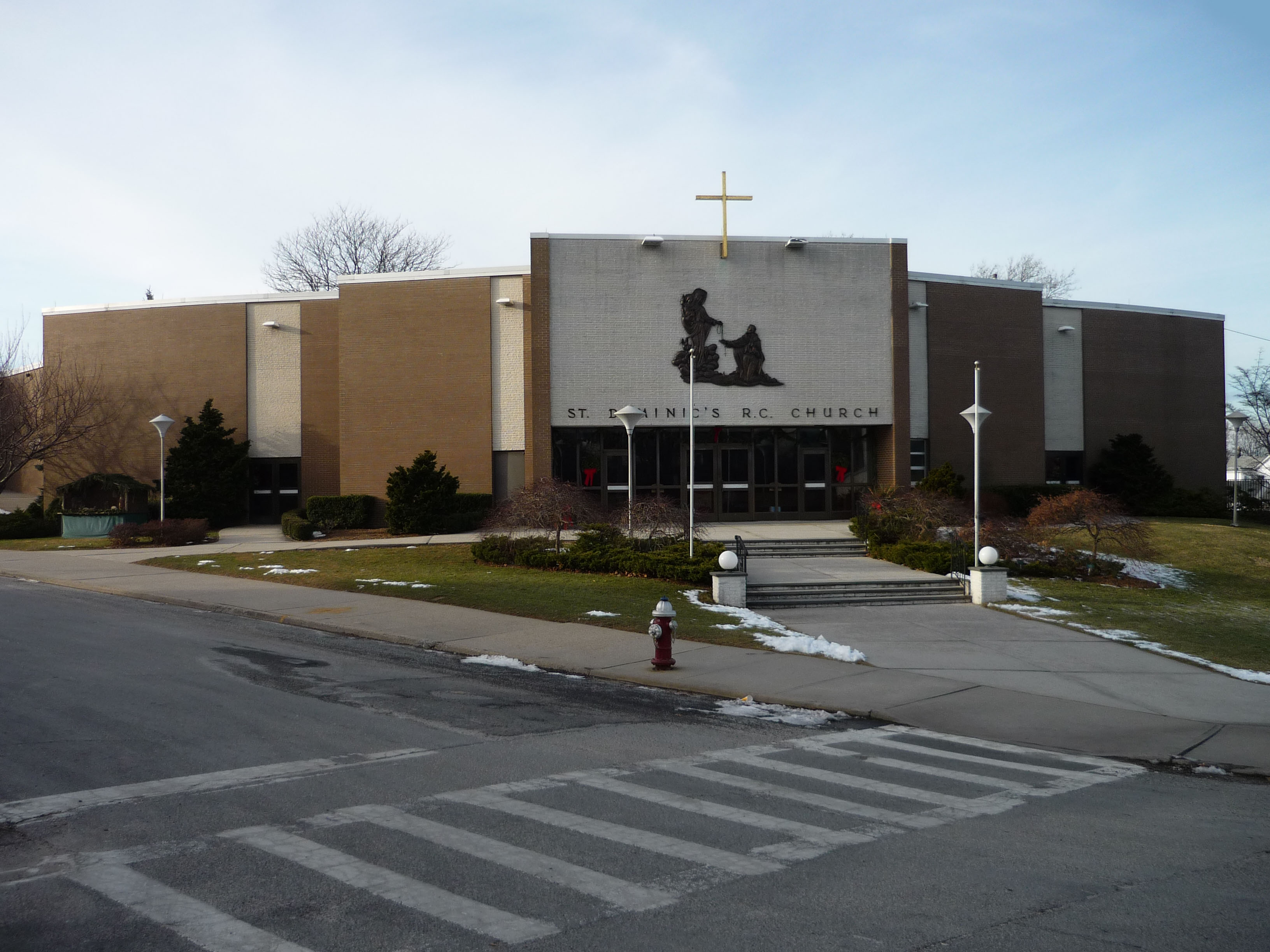
Photo of St. Dominic's Church, 2009

St. Dominic's Roman Catholic Church has expanded greatly since that Thanksgiving Day over a century ago. In 1922, they established a grammar school and in 1928, a high school. To accommodate their growing congregation, in 1968, Fr. James E. Collins (Pastor) broke ground on a large contemporary church building, located across the street from this one. The current Pastor is Rev. Msgr. Thomas More Coogan and the Associate Pastor is Rev. Joseph Lettieri

Today St. Dominic's six acre campus has eleven different buildings, including schools, offices, a sports complex, a rectory, a seminary and of course the two churches.

== See also ==
- Oyster Bay History Walk
- List of Town of Oyster Bay Landmarks
- National Register of Historic Places listings in Nassau County, New York
