= Broome County Courthouse =

- U.S. National Register of Historic Places
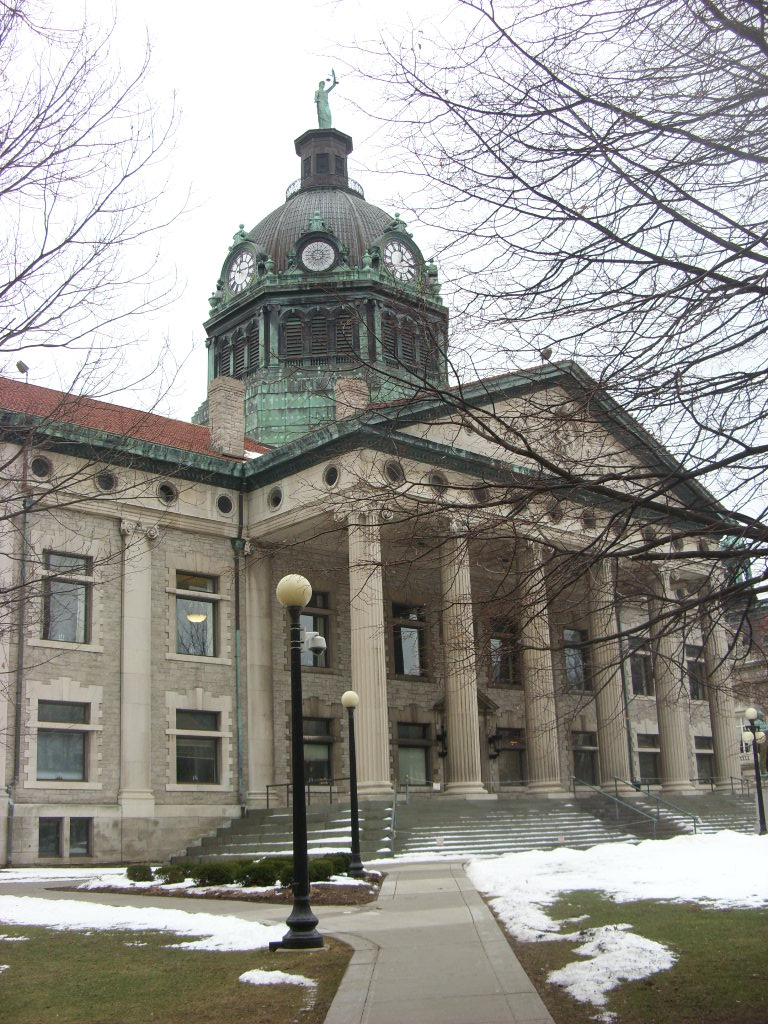
- Broome County Courthouse, December 2008

- Location within New York Location within the United States
- Interactive map showing the location of Brooke County Courthouse
- Location: Court St., Binghamton, New York
- Coordinates: 42°5′53″N 75°54′42″W
- Area: 4.5 acres (1.8 ha)
- Built: 1897
- Architect: Perry, Isaac G.; Leonard, Miles
- Architectural style: Classical Revival
- NRHP reference No.: 73001164
- Added to NRHP: May 22, 1973

Broome County Courthouse is a historic courthouse located at Binghamton in Broome County, New York. It is a massive 2 1/2-story structure, built on a raised foundation, in the form of a Latin Cross and topped with an elegant copper dome. Originally constructed in 1897–1898 in a "T" shape, the south wing was added in 1916–1917 to form the cross. It was designed by noted New York State architect Isaac G. Perry.

== History ==
Prior to the formation of Broome County, the land had been part of Tioga County since its formation in 1791, with its initial court sessions held in Newtown (present-day Elmira). As the county had settlements in both its eastern and western portions, a second county judicial district was established in 1793 in the present-day town of Dickinson, with proceedings held at the residence of prominent Binghamton land agent Joshua Whitney. In 1802, a formal courthouse was built at Chenango Point (present-day Binghamton) on the northwest corner of Court and Chenango Street. William Bingham, owner of the land that became the city, donated what is now Courthouse Square for use as a public square, and the courthouse was moved across the street.

When Broome County was split off from Tioga County in 1806, a new courthouse was erected at Courthouse Square, the first to be officially known as the Broome County Courthouse. Rapid growth in the county led to the construction of larger replacement courthouses in 1828 and 1856 (the first to be made of brick). A fire on December 28, 1896 destroyed the courthouse, leading to the construction of the fourth Broome County Courthouse starting in 1897.

The courthouse and its square were the inspiration for Johnny Cash's 1974 song "Ragged Old Flag". He wrote the song after walking around the square while in town for a concert.

It was listed on the National Register of Historic Places in 1973. In addition to its individual listing, the courthouse is located within the boundaries of the Court Street Historic District.
