= Binghamton Railway Company Complex =

- U.S. National Register of Historic Places
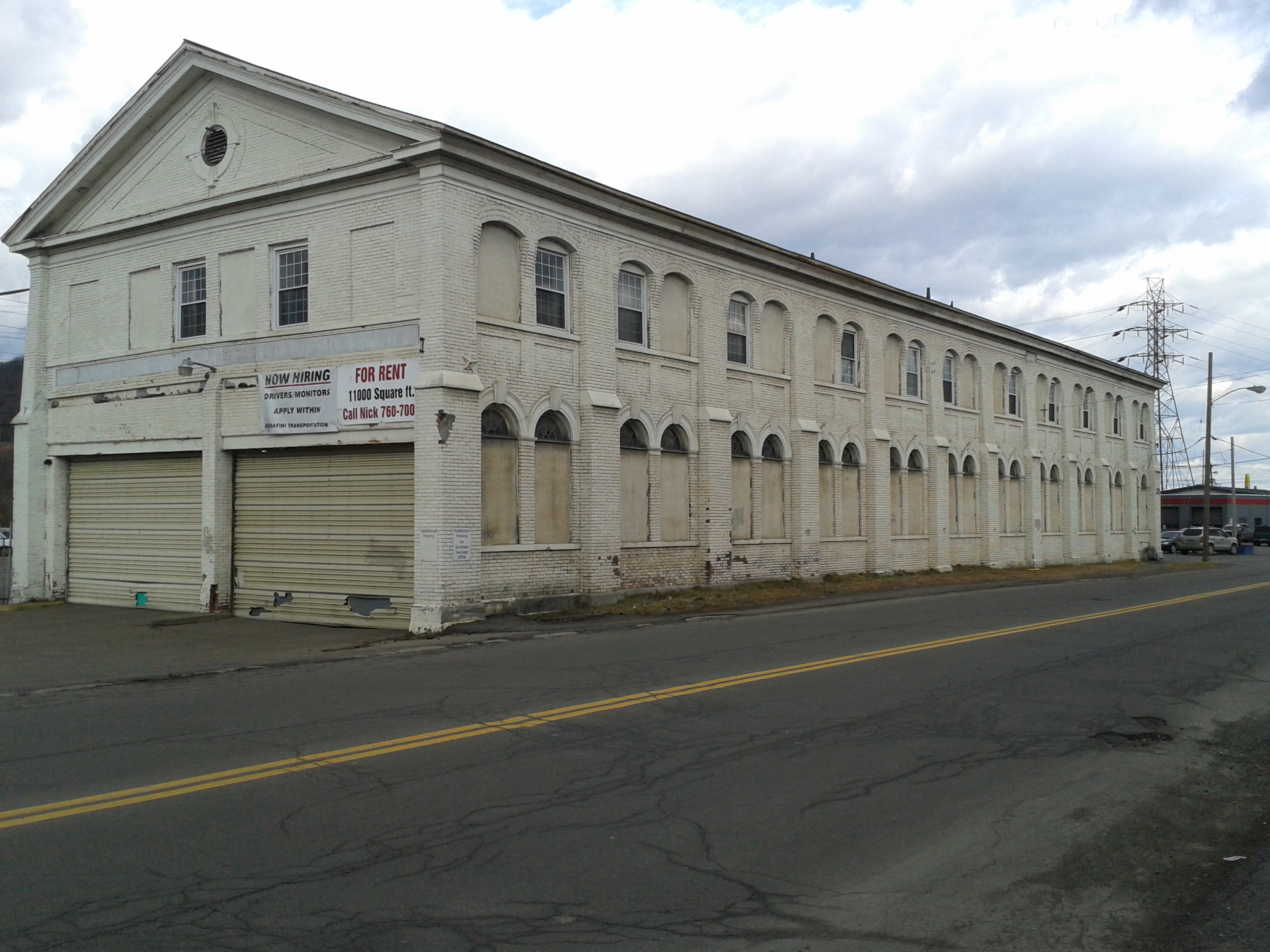
- Binghamton Railway Company Complex, February 2012

- Location within New York Location within the United States
- Location: 375 State St., Binghamton, New York
- Coordinates: 42°6′25″N 75°54′33″W
- Area: 1.4 acres (0.57 ha)
- Built: 1893
- NRHP reference No.: 06001076
- Added to NRHP: November 29, 2006

Binghamton Railway Company Complex is a historic railway complex located at Binghamton in Broome County, New York.

It was listed on the National Register of Historic Places in 2006.
