= Binghamton City Hall =

- U.S. National Register of Historic Places
- U.S. Historic district – Contributing property
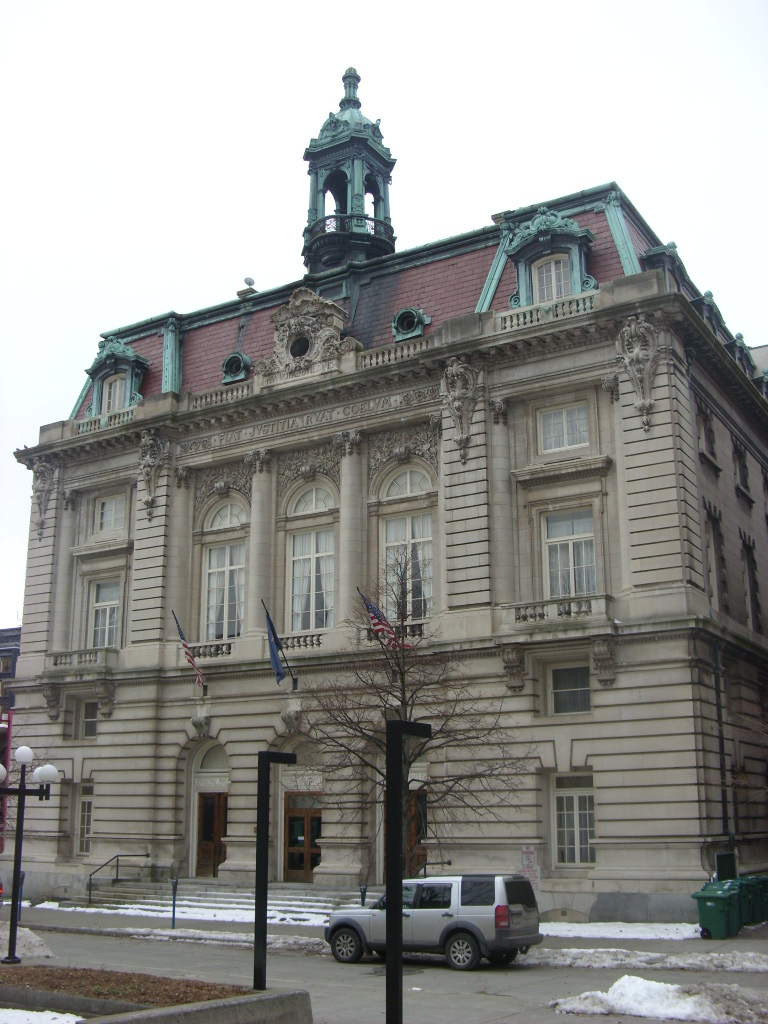
- Binghamton City Hall, December 2008

- Location within New York Location within the United States
- Interactive map showing Binghamton City Hall
- Location: 79 Collier St, Binghamton, New York
- Coordinates: 42°5′53″N 75°54′45″W
- Area: 9 acres (3.6 ha)
- Built: 1897
- Architect: Ingle & Almirall
- Architectural style: Second Empire style
- NRHP reference No.: 71000530
- Added to NRHP: March 18, 1971

Binghamton City Hall is a historic city hall located at Binghamton in Broome County, New York.

The building was designed by Ingle & Almirall in the Second Empire style. It is a five-story masonry structure with basement. The city hall was built in 1897–1898. It features a mansard roof and prominent cupola.

The city hall is located within the boundaries of the Court Street Historic District.

It was listed on the National Register of Historic Places in 1971. In 1972 the city government moved to Government Plaza. After sitting vacant for a decade, The building was converted to a hotel, and in 2020 to apartments.

== See also ==
- List of mayors of Binghamton, New York
