= Court Street Historic District (Binghamton, New York) =

Historic district in New York, United States

- U.S. National Register of Historic Places
- U.S. Historic district
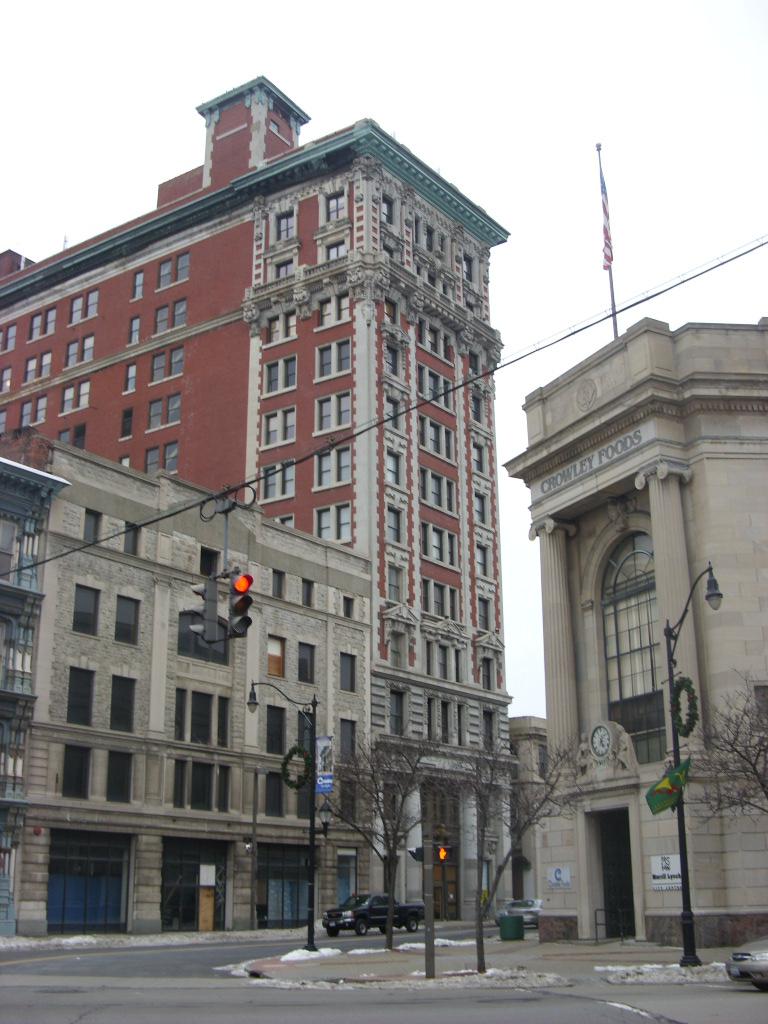
- Court Street Historic District in Binghamton, New York, December 2008

- Location within New York Location within the United States
- Interactive map of Court Street Historic District
- Location: Roughly bounded by the Chenango River, Carroll, Henry, and Hawley Sts., Binghamton, New York
- Coordinates: 42°5′55″N 75°54′42″W
- Area: 33 acres (13 ha)
- Built: 1840
- Architect: Multiple
- Architectural style: Late 19th And 20th Century Revivals, Late Victorian, Art Deco
- NRHP reference No.: 84002066
- Added to NRHP: September 7, 1984

Court Street Historic District is a national historic district located at Binghamton in Broome County, New York. The district includes 87 contributing buildings and encompasses the historic downtown core of downtown Binghamton. The majority of the contributing structures are commercial buildings built between about 1840 and 1939. Ten and twelve story office buildings built in the 20th century are prominent features of the district. Located within the boundaries of the district are the separately listed Broome County Courthouse and Binghamton City Hall.

It was listed on the National Register of Historic Places in 1984.
