= Alfred Dunk House =

Historic house in New York, United States

- U.S. National Register of Historic Places
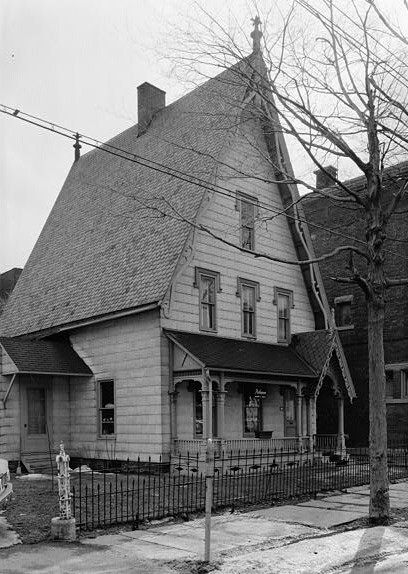
- 1963

- Location within New York Location within the United States
- Location: 4 Pine St., Binghamton, New York
- Coordinates: 42°6′1″N 75°54′28″W
- Area: 1.6 acres (0.65 ha)
- Built: c. 1853
- Architectural style: Carpenter Gothic
- NRHP reference No.: 85000593
- Added to NRHP: March 21, 1985

The Alfred Dunk House (also known as the Brinker House) is a historic house located in Binghamton, Broome County, New York.

== Description and history ==
It was built in about 1853 or 1854, and is a two-story plus attic, wood-framed house built over a stone basement. It is distinguished by the extremely steep pitch of its gable, which is decorated with scroll sawn bargeboards and surmounted by its original finial and pendant in the Carpenter Gothic style.

It was listed on the National Register of Historic Places on March 21, 1985.

Dunk went on to found Binghamton Iron Works and in 1889 would have a commercial building constructed about a block from this house at 140-144 Court Street. Like the house, that building also survives.

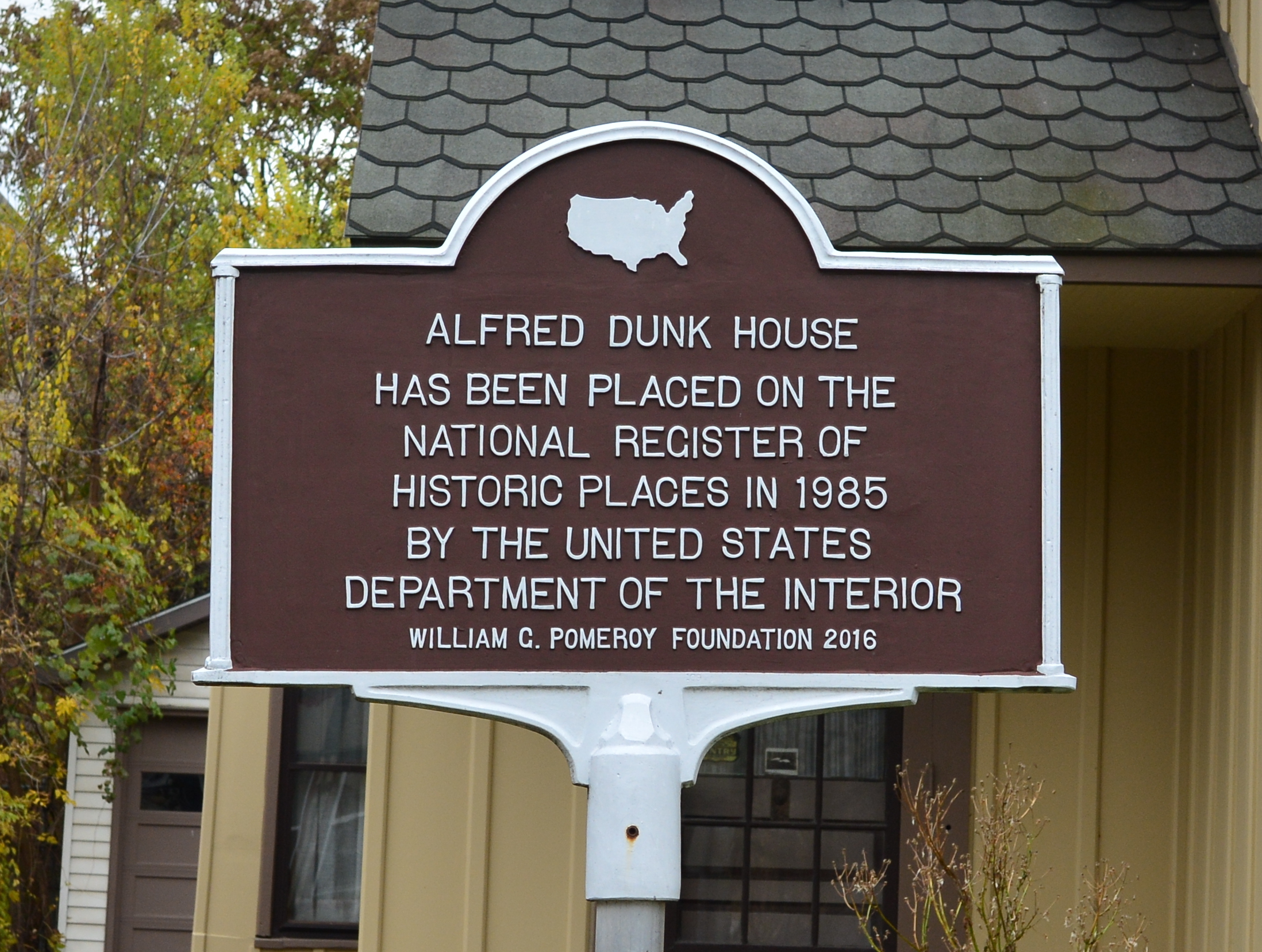
Dunk House historic plaque
