= Public Bath No. 7 =

Bathhouse in Brooklyn, New York

- U.S. National Register of Historic Places
- New York State Register of Historic Places
- New York City Landmark
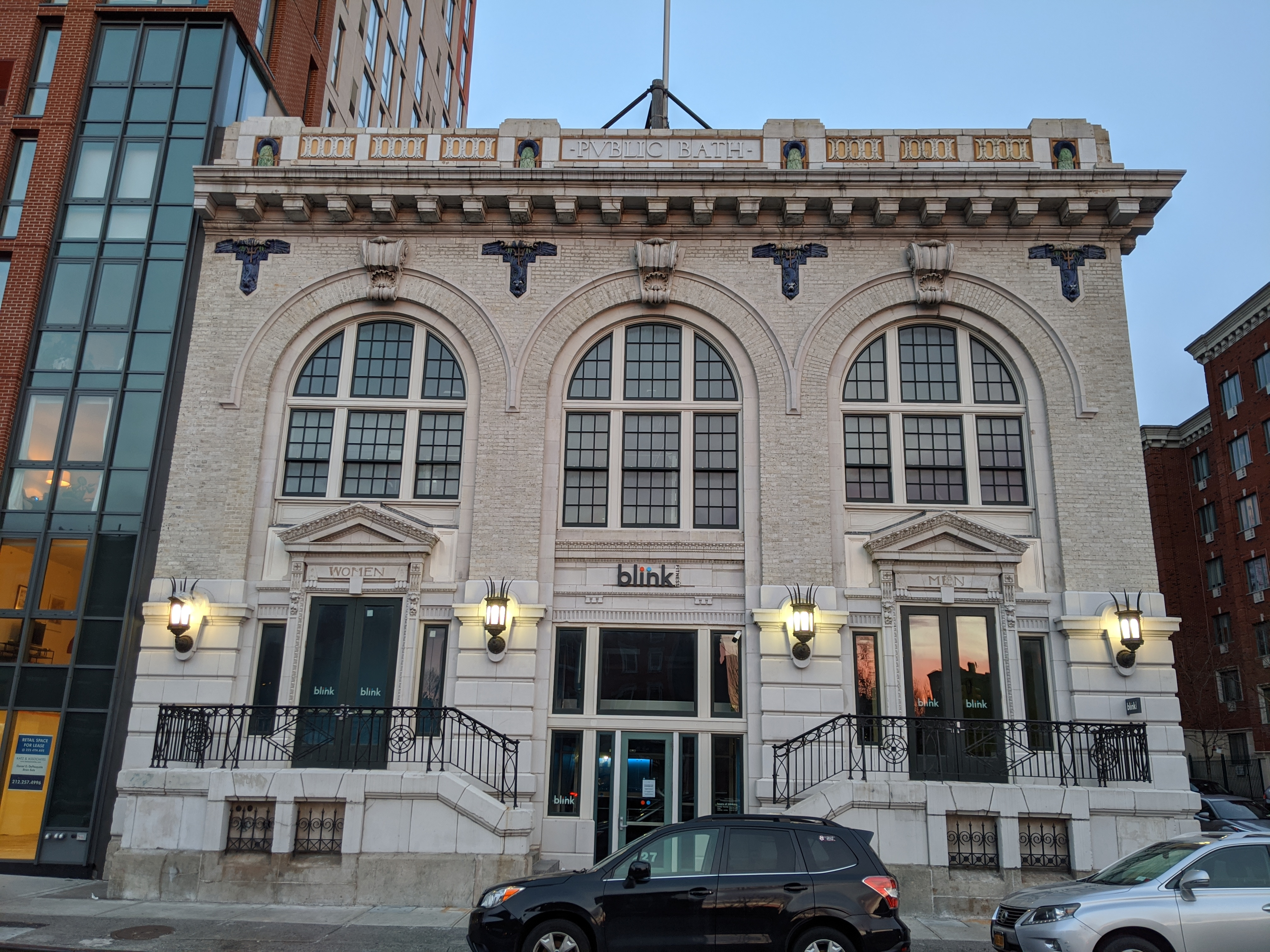
- Public Bath 7, April 2020

- Location within New York City Location within New York Location within the United States
- Location: 227-231 Fourth Ave., New York, New York
- Coordinates: 40°40′36″N 73°59′0″W
- Area: less than one acre
- Built: 1906
- Architects: Almirall, Raymond F.
- Architectural style: Romanesque
- NRHP reference No.: 85002275
- NYSRHP No.: 04701.013737
- NYCL No.: 1287

Significant dates
- Added to NRHP: September 12, 1985
- Designated NYSRHP: August 7, 1985
- Designated NYCL: September 11, 1984

Public Bath No. 7 is a historic bathhouse located in Park Slope, Brooklyn, New York City. It was designed by Brooklyn architect Raymond F. Almirall. It was built between 1906 and 1910 and is constructed of white glazed brick and limestone colored terracotta blocks. The design is based on a Renaissance palazzo. It measures three bays by five bays. The bathhouse was converted to a gymnasium in 1937.

It was listed on the National Register of Historic Places in 1985.

In the 1990s, it was converted to a private events space and renamed The Lyceum.

The building was placed for sale at a foreclosure auction in early 2013; the next year, Greystone acquired the building for $7.6 million. The previous owner, Eric Richmond, filed a lawsuit in 2015, claiming that the building had illegally been auctioned even after he had appealed a bankruptcy judge's ruling to auction the property.

In 2017, the building finished restoration. The building was sold for $10 million in 2018; at the time, it contained a Blink Fitness location.

== See also ==
- List of New York City Designated Landmarks in Brooklyn
- National Register of Historic Places listings in Kings County, New York
