= Ansco Company Charles Street Factory Buildings =

- U.S. National Register of Historic Places
- Location within New York Location within the United States
- Location: 15 & 17 Charles, & 219 Clinton Sts., Binghamton, New York
- Coordinates: 42°06′25″N 75°55′52″W
- Area: 3.07 acres (1.24 ha)
- Built: 1910-1911, 1953-1954
- Built by: Frank W. O'Connell, Inc.
- MPS: Industrial Resources of Broome County, New York
- NRHP reference No.: 12000531
- Added to NRHP: August 22, 2012

Ansco Company Charles Street Factory Buildings, also known as Agfa-Ansco, General Aniline and Film (GAF), and Anitec, is a historic factory complex located at Binghamton, Broome County, New York. They are two early factory buildings built in 1910–1911, and a warehouse built in 1953–1954. The larger building measures approximately 45 feet wide and 230 feet long. It is a three-story, rectangular brick heavy timber frame building. The powerhouse is a two-story, reinforced concrete and steel brick building measuring 60 feet square. The buildings housed manufacturing operations of Ansco for photographic paper.

It was listed on the National Register of Historic Places in 2012.
