= Goodwill Theatre =

- U.S. National Register of Historic Places
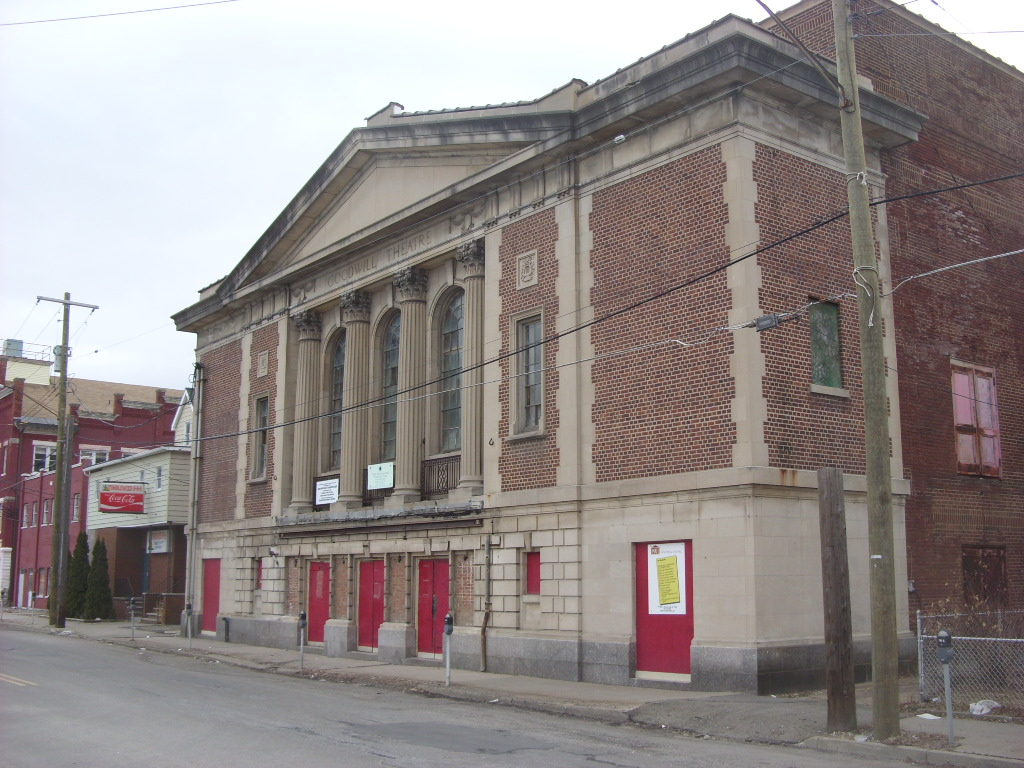
- Goodwill Theatre, February 2009

- Location within New York Location within the United States
- Location: 36 Willow St., Johnson City, New York
- Coordinates: 42°6′50″N 75°57′18″W
- Area: less than one acre
- Built: 1920
- Architect: Lacey, Schenck & Cummings
- Architectural style: Late 19th And 20th Century Revivals
- NRHP reference No.: 99001655
- Added to NRHP: January 7, 2000

Goodwill Theatre is a historic movie theater located at Johnson City in Broome County, New York. It is a three-story steel frame building on a concrete foundation built in 1920. Its exterior is faced with red brick, cut limestone and marble in the Neoclassical style. It was a gift to the people of Johnson City by George F. Johnson (1857–1948), founder of Endicott-Johnson Shoe Company.

It was listed on the National Register of Historic Places in 2000.

The theatre is currently a performing arts theatre.

== Staff ==
- Naima Kradjian - Chief Executive Officer
- Christine Springer - General Manager
- MaKenna Williams - Marketing Manager
- Matthew Nowakowski - Bookkeeper
- Sarah Wallikas - Box Office Manager
- Steven Foltyn - Technology Support
