= Trinity Memorial Church (Binghamton, New York) =

Historic church in New York, United States

- U.S. National Register of Historic Places
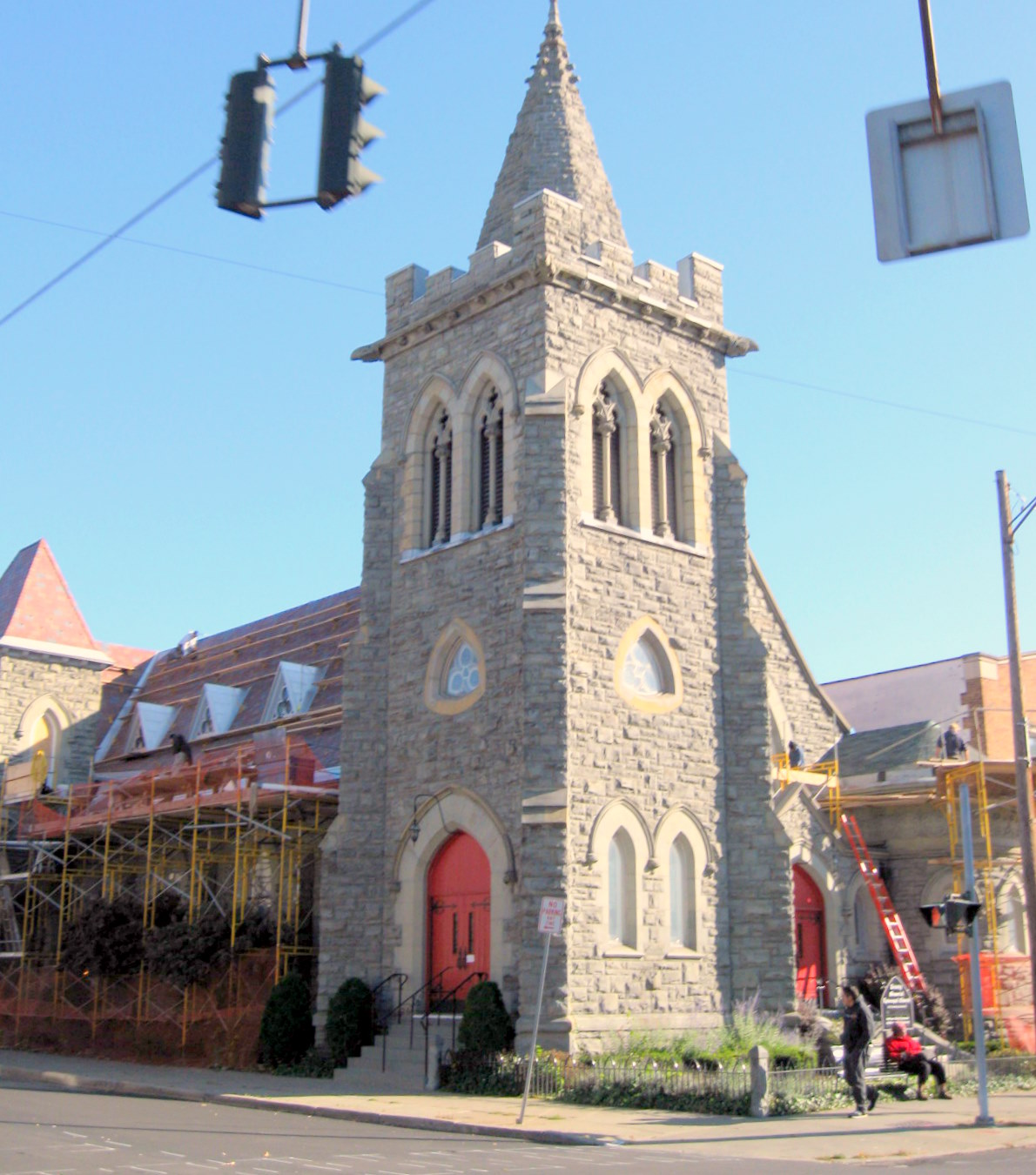
- Trinity Memorial Church, October 2009

- Location within New York Location within the United States
- Location: 44 Main St., Binghamton, New York
- Coordinates: 42°5′59″N 75°53′1″W
- Area: less than one acre
- Built: 1897; 1949
- Architect: Lacey & Bartoo (1897); George Bain Cummings (1949)
- Architectural style: Gothic
- MPS: Historic Churches of the Episcopal Diocese of Central New York MPS
- NRHP reference No.: 98001389
- Added to NRHP: November 19, 1998

Trinity Memorial Church is a historic Episcopal church located at Binghamton in Broome County, New York. It was completed in 1897 and is a High Victorian Gothic style structure constructed of bluestone with limestone watertable and trim. The front facade features a large square projecting tower with a side entrance and a smaller, secondary apse. Also on the front facade is a large Gothic arched window with geometric tracery and stained glass.

The original architects were Lacey & Bartoo. In 1949 the parish house was completed to designs by George Bain Cummings, their successor.

It was listed on the National Register of Historic Places in 1998.
