= Robert H. Rose House =

Historic house in New York, United States

- U.S. National Register of Historic Places
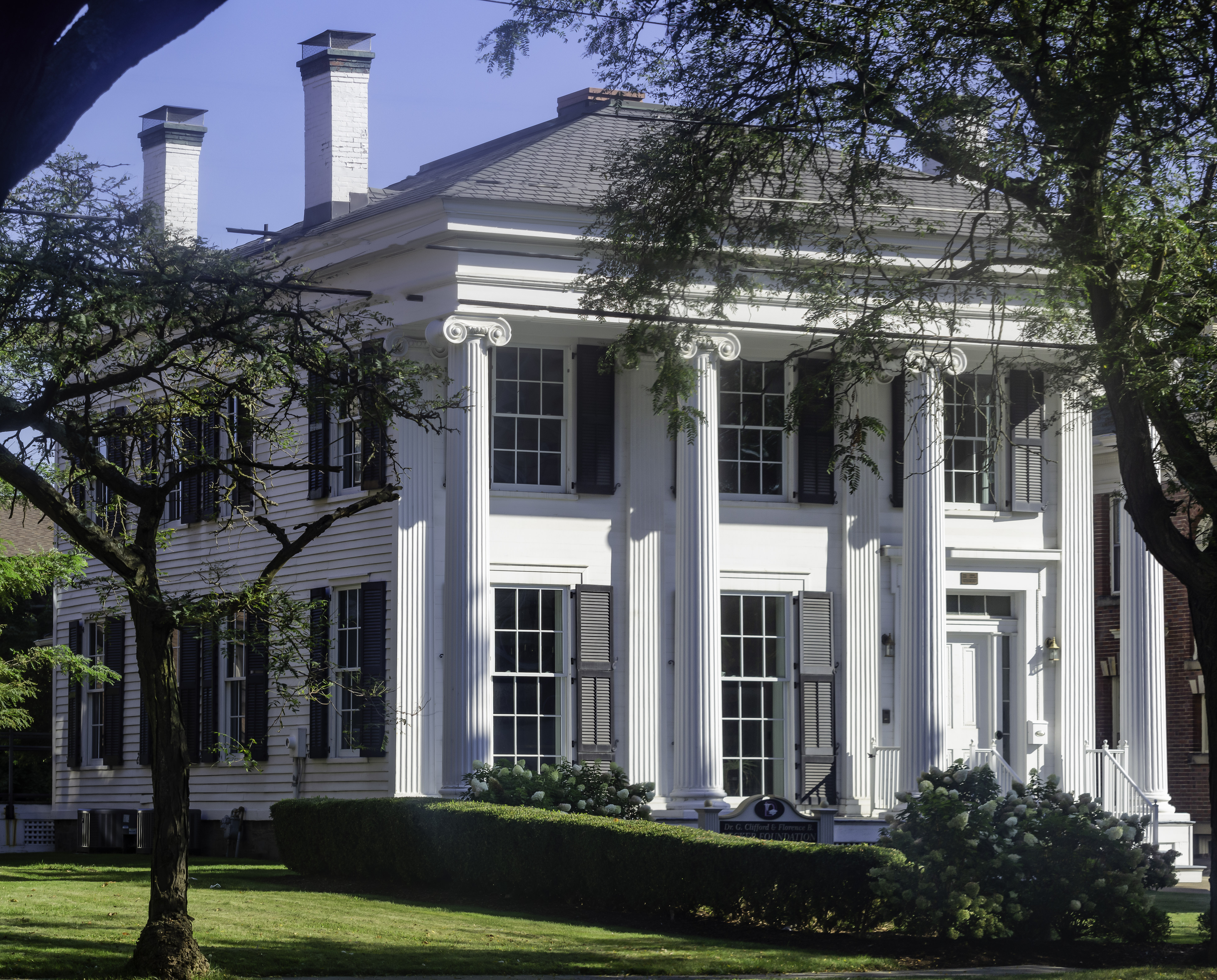

- Location within New York Location within the United States
- Location: 3 Riverside Dr., Binghamton, New York, USA
- Coordinates: 42°5′33″N 75°55′13″W
- Area: 2.9 acres (1.2 ha)
- Built: 1896
- Architect: Vosbury, C. Edward
- Architectural style: Queen Anne, Romanesque
- NRHP reference No.: 80002592
- Added to NRHP: August 26, 1980

Robert H. Rose House, also known as Rose Mansion, was a historic home located at Binghamton in Broome County, New York, United States. It was demolished on 17 September 1980.

It was listed on the National Register of Historic Places on 26 August 1980.
