= Belden Tunnel =

Railway tunnel located in New York, United States

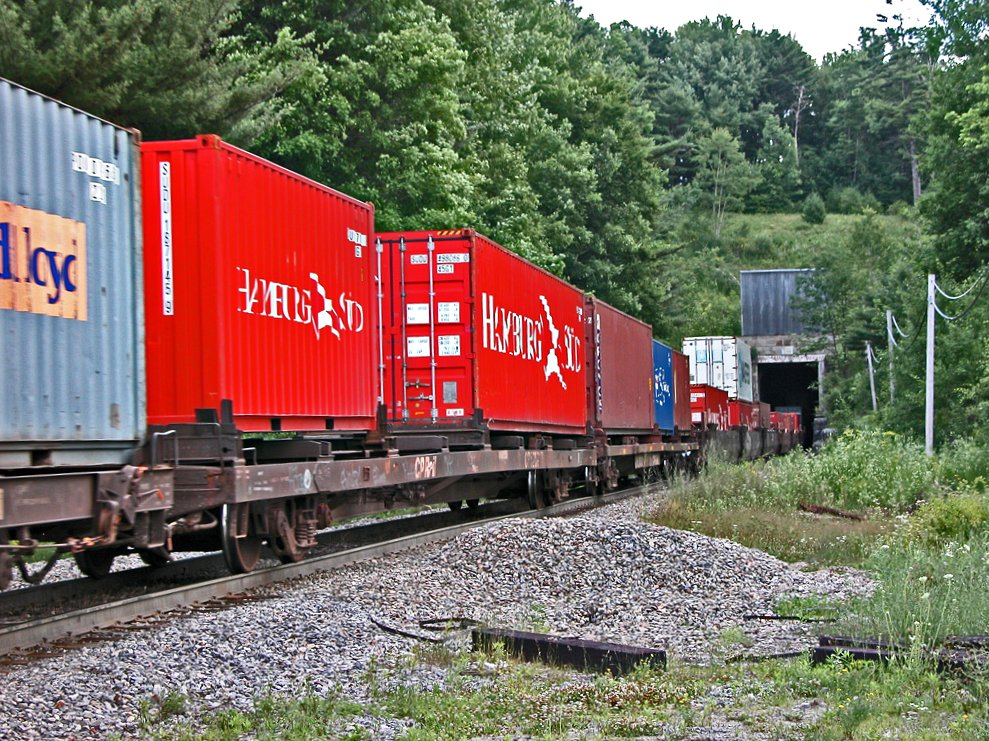
- A train at the tunnel's west portal in 2007
- Interactive map of Belden Tunnel

Overview
- Location: Colesville, New York
- Coordinates: 42°13′3″N 75°42′52″W
- Status: Operating
- Crosses: Belden Hill

Operation
- Constructed: 1864–1868
- Opened: 1869
- Rebuilt: 1985
- Owner: Norfolk Southern Railway
- Traffic: Train
- Character: Freight

Technical
- Length: 2,240 feet (683 m)
- No. of tracks: Single
- Track gauge: 1,435 mm (4 ft 8 1/2 in) standard gauge
- Tunnel clearance: 28 feet (8.5 m)
- Width: 18 feet (5.5 m)

The Belden Tunnel, also known as the Belden Hill Tunnel, is a 2,240-foot (680 m) active railroad tunnel located in the town of Colesville in Broome County, New York. The tunnel's west portal is located in the hamlet of Tunnel, a community which was settled by workers building the tunnel. Constructed between 1864 and 1868, the Belden Tunnel is one of the earliest railroad tunnels in the United States and has been designated as a state historic civil engineering landmark. In August 1869, the tunnel was the site of a railroad war between the Albany and Susquehanna Railroad and the Erie Railroad for control of the line between Albany and Binghamton. The tunnel was rebuilt in 1985 to accommodate higher and wider loads.

== History ==
=== Construction and opening ===
Construction of the Albany and Susquehanna Railroad (A&S) from Albany, New York to Binghamton, New York began in 1853. The most difficult hurdle in the terrain along the route was Belden Hill in the town of Colesville, which was decided to be crossed with a tunnel.

By January 1864, 45 miles (72 km) of the line had been opened between Albany and Cobleskill. That spring, excavation of the west portal of the Belden Tunnel began, and the surrounding area that was settled by construction workers became known as the hamlet of Tunnel. The tunnel was constructed by using drilling and blasting. For a distance of 323 feet (98 m) at its west portal and 100 feet (30 m) at its east portal, the tunnel was originally lined with stone walls and brick arches; the remainder of the tunnel was originally lined with timber and subsequently lined with brick and stone as the timber was only expected to last up to four years.

By December 1867, the tracks from Albany had been extended to Harpursville for a total distance of 120 miles (190 km). The remaining 22-mile (35 km) segment of the line between Harpursville and Binghamton—including the Belden Tunnel—was completed on December 31, 1868 and the entire line was opened to train traffic in January 1869. The 2,240-foot-long (680 m) tunnel was one of the earliest railroad tunnels in the United States.

=== Early history ===
Soon after the new railroad line between Albany and Binghamton was completed, Jay Gould and James Fisk—the owners of the Erie Railroad—sought to take financial control of the line and began buying up shares of the A&S, which was headed by Joseph H. Ramsey. The new line provided access from Northeastern Pennsylvania's Coal Region to New York's Capital District and the A&S had secured a contract to transport coal along the line. A railroad war ensued and culminated in a three-day battle at the Belden Tunnel in August 1869 where an A&S train from Albany met an Erie train from Binghamton, both of which were carrying hundreds of armed men trying to take control of the railroad tracks. The battle was brought to an end when the 44th Regiment of the New York State Militia was called to the site. Possession of the line was given to the A&S by a court order the following year. The battle between the competing railroads was portrayed in the 1941 novel Saratoga Trunk and the 1945 film Saratoga Trunk.

The line was leased by the A&S to the Delaware & Hudson Canal Co. (the predecessor of the Delaware & Hudson Railway) beginning in 1870 and was later bought out by the Delaware & Hudson (D&H) in 1945.

With both portals of the tunnel located at lower elevations compared to the midpoint, the accumulation of smoke and gas from locomotives and pusher engines inside the tunnel became an issue and led to the addition of a ventilation shaft near the middle of the tunnel in 1908. The accumulation of ice inside the tunnel during the winter was also problematic and deteriorated the tunnel's lining, requiring repairs including replacing the stone walls with metal liners, repointing the brick arch, and the installation of rock bolts in the crown of the tunnel. In April 1960, a D&H employee was killed in the Belden Hill Tunnel when a 600-to-700-pound (270 to 320 kg) fragment of ice fell on him; the man had been part of a crew of workers that had used rifles to clear accumulations of ice from the tunnel's ventilation shaft and were removing the fragments of ice that had fallen down the shaft into the tunnel. The bottom of the vent shaft was later closed to prevent ice from damaging or derailing passing trains. Doors at the tunnel's portals were also used to control the accumulation of ice within the tunnel. The tunnel originally had wooden doors, which were removed in 1926, replaced in 1944, and later removed due to maintenance issues.

=== Renovation ===
The dimensions of the original tunnel were not large enough to accommodate newer types of rolling stock such as tri-level autoracks and high-and-wide loads, which had to be detoured around the Belden Tunnel via the Ninevah Branch. By the early 1980s, the structural condition of the tunnel was also rapidly deteriorating. In 1982, the D&H and New York State Department of Transportation began performing investigations and studies to enlarge and rehabilitate the tunnel. The D&H was subsequently purchased by Guilford Transportation Industries in 1984.

Reconstruction of the Belden Tunnel began on July 8, 1985. Rail traffic that had been using the tunnel was detoured along D&H's line between Nineveh, New York and Lanesboro, Pennsylvania during the project, which was expected to take about five months to complete. The $8 million project expanded the dimensions of the tunnel to a width of 18 feet (5.5 m) and a height of 28 feet (8.5 m). The work was funded as part of a transportation bond issue that was approved by state voters in 1983. On October 24, 1985, a worker was killed inside the tunnel when a 1,000-pound (450 kg) concrete slab fell on him; the person was part of a five-person construction crew that was measuring the tunnel's dimensions. Rehabilitation of the tunnel was substantially completed by the end of the year and the tunnel was placed back into revenue service on December 28, 1985. The work remaining on the tunnel, which included installation of drains, shotcrete, and a portal door, was deferred until the spring of 1986 and was completed while the tunnel was used by rail traffic. A vertical lift door was installed at the west portal to protect the tunnel from the prevailing westerly winds. The door was opened and closed remotely and used a counterweight system.

The Belden Tunnel was designated as a state historic civil engineering landmark by the American Society of Civil Engineers and a plaque marking the designation was unveiled on September 17, 1987. Four days later, the tunnel was the scene of an accident in which a 13-year-old boy was killed by a freight train; he had been with two other kids riding their all-terrain vehicle on the tracks but was unable to get out of the path of an oncoming train.

Norfolk Southern Railway acquired the rail line in 2015. The vertical lift door at the tunnel's west portal was replaced with a roll-up door in 2021, which like the previous door is also counterbalanced with weights.
