= Davis College (New York) =

Baptist bible college in New York, U.S.

Coordinates: 43.730415°N 73.813829°W

- Motto: Pursue God
- Type: Private
- Established: 1900
- President: D. Alan Blanc
- Faculty: 5 FT/ 19 PT (2023)
- Undergraduates: 161 (2023)
- Location: Pottersville, New York, U.S.
- Campus: Suburban area, 22 acres (8.9 ha)
- Mascot: Falcons
- Website: www.davisny.edu

Davis College (formerly Practical Bible College) is a private Baptist bible college. It is affiliated with the Baptist Convention of New York and endorsed by the Baptist Convention of Pennsylvania/South Jersey. The school currently offers its BRE degree at the campus of the Word of Life Bible Institute, located at 4230 Glendale Road in Pottersville, New York, with which the school has a close relationship.

It was formerly located in Johnson City, New York from 1900 to 2019, a location that was also previously known, starting in October 1911, as the post office of Bible School Park, New York.

== History ==
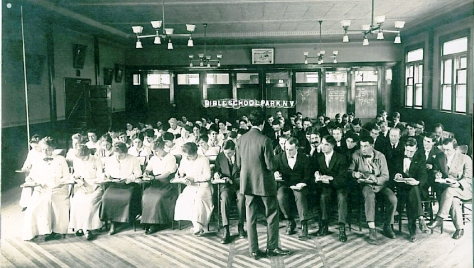
The first classes at Practical Bible Training School were held above a store in Lestershire, New York.

Davis College was founded in April 1900 by evangelist Reverend John Adelbert Davis. Rev. Davis wanted to start a school similar to his alma mater, Chicago's Moody Bible Institute. He taught the first classes at what was then known as Practical Bible School with an enrollment of around 80 to 90 students. The school's first classes were held in an upper level of a store in the Lestershire neighborhood of Johnson City. In 1911, the college relocated to the former location of the White City Amusement Park, also known as Wagner Park, which had failed the previous year. It would remain at this location until 2019.

After Davis' death in 1934, his oldest son, Gordon Carr Davis, became the president and Practical Bible Training School changed its legal name to the John A. Davis Memorial Bible School, in memory of his father. In 1993, it was renamed Practical Bible College. In August 2004, the college became Davis College in honor of its founder John A. Davis.

=== Sale of Johnson City campus ===
In 2019 the Johnson City campus was sold for $3.7 million. By September 2023, the former campus had been re-sold in pieces, with the dorms being purchased for $1.3 million and the academic buildings to Birchwood Management Group for $4.5 million.

=== Presidents ===
- John R. Clements, 1900 – July 31, 1914
- John Adelbert Davis, August 7, 1914 – March 17, 1934
- Gordon Carr Davis, April 30, 1934 – December 7, 1961
- Marion C. Patterson, December 11, 1961 – December 31, 1970
- Kenneth C. Robb, January 1, 1971 – June 30, 1980
- Woodrow M. Kroll, January 1, 1981 – May 31, 1990
- Dale E. Linebaugh, July 1, 1991 – June 30, 1998
- George D. Miller III, July 1, 1998 – June 30, 2008
- Dino J. Pedrone, July 1, 2008 – January 15, 2018
- George Snyder Jr., January 16, 2018 – January 17, 2019 (interim)
- D. Alan Blanc Sr., January 18, 2019 – present (interim through September 24, 2021)

== Academics ==
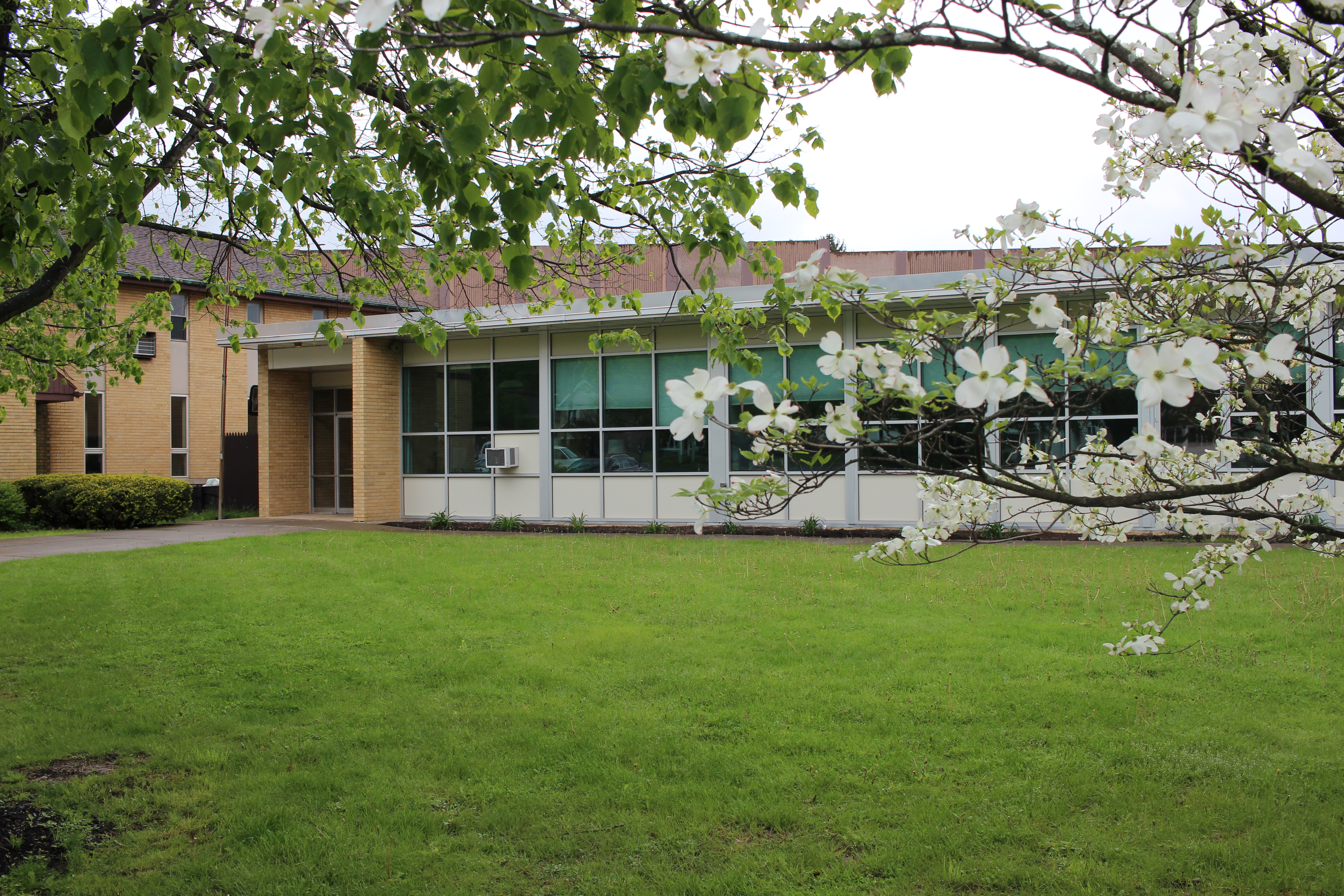
Davis College

The college was accredited nationally by The Association for Biblical Higher Education in 1985. In 1993, the school was accredited by the State of New York and became Practical Bible College. Davis College was first regionally accredited in June 2005 by the Middle States Association of Colleges and Schools.

Specialized ministry programs include Pastoral Studies, Youth Ministries, Teaching English as a Second Language, Christian Ministries, Intercultural Studies, Music and Worship, and Organizational Leadership.

The college also offers a "4 Plus 1" Elementary Education articulation agreement allowing graduates from the Christian Ministries program to pursue a MsEd in Childhood Education at a Christian university. This provides certification that is reciprocal in 48 states, including New York and Florida, allowing graduates to teach in both public and private schools. One year certificates are also offered in Bible and Teaching English as a Second Language.

In 2012, Davis College purchased Blessed Sacrament Church, which was heavily damaged by flooding in 2011. This acquisition provided the school with its first distinct chapel.
