= George D. Miller III =

American academic administrator

George Daniel Miller III (March 27, 1951) was the eighth president of Davis College in Johnson City, New York. He is currently Pastor Emeritus of The Gathering Place (North Syracuse Baptist Church) and on the Board of Gracism Global and Mission Landing Cuba. He is married to Elaine and they have 3 children.

Dr. George D. Miller III in his office

== Early life ==
Miller was born in Trenton, New Jersey, the son of Pastor George Daniel Miller II and Eleanor. He has one younger brother, Robert.

== Practical Bible Training School ==
In the Fall of 1962 he and his family moved to Johnson City, New York where his father attended Practical Bible Training School. His father graduated in the spring of 1965. In the Fall of 1969 Miller also attended PBTS and graduated in 1972.

== Higher education ==
After graduating from PBTS with the three-year diploma he attended Bryan College in Dayton, Tennessee, to receive his bachelor's degree. He went on to get his master's degree and doctorate from Syracuse University. He has been an educator and trained Christian counselor with a substantial educational and experiential background.

== Return to PBTS ==
In 1981 Dr. Woodrow M. Kroll asked Miller to return with him as Dr. Kroll took up the presidency. During this time he was vice president for institutional advancement, and previous to that served as vice president for student affairs. He continued to work at the college after Dr. Kroll left to become a Bible teacher at Back to Bible and Dr. Dale E. Linebaugh became the 7th president of Practical.

== President ==
On graduation day 1998 Dr. Dale E. Linebaugh introduced Miller as the 8th president to school. During his administration the school has celebrated its centennial birthday, in 2000; the name of the college was changed to Davis College in honor of its founder Dr. John Adelbert Davis, in 2004; the college received Middle States Accreditation, in 2005; and two old buildings were taken down to pave the way for the Ministry Center to be built in the future, in 2006. In May 2007 he resigned to the board of trustees. He served as president of Davis College until April 2008.

== North Syracuse Baptist Church ==
In the summer of 2008 he was called to be the senior pastor of the North Syracuse Baptist Church in Syracuse, New York. He retired in 2021 and was named Pastor Emeritus.

== Publications ==
Miller has written numerous articles for periodicals on a wide variety of subjects pertaining to counseling. He is co-editor of Hope Grows in Winter, published by Kregel Press, and authored the chapter, "The Tribulation", in Looking Ahead, a book on biblical prophecy published by Faithful Life Publishers. He authored the chapter "Dare To Care" in "L.O.V.E. Is The Answer" by A.J. Ali.
