= DaQuan Jones =

American football player (born 1991)

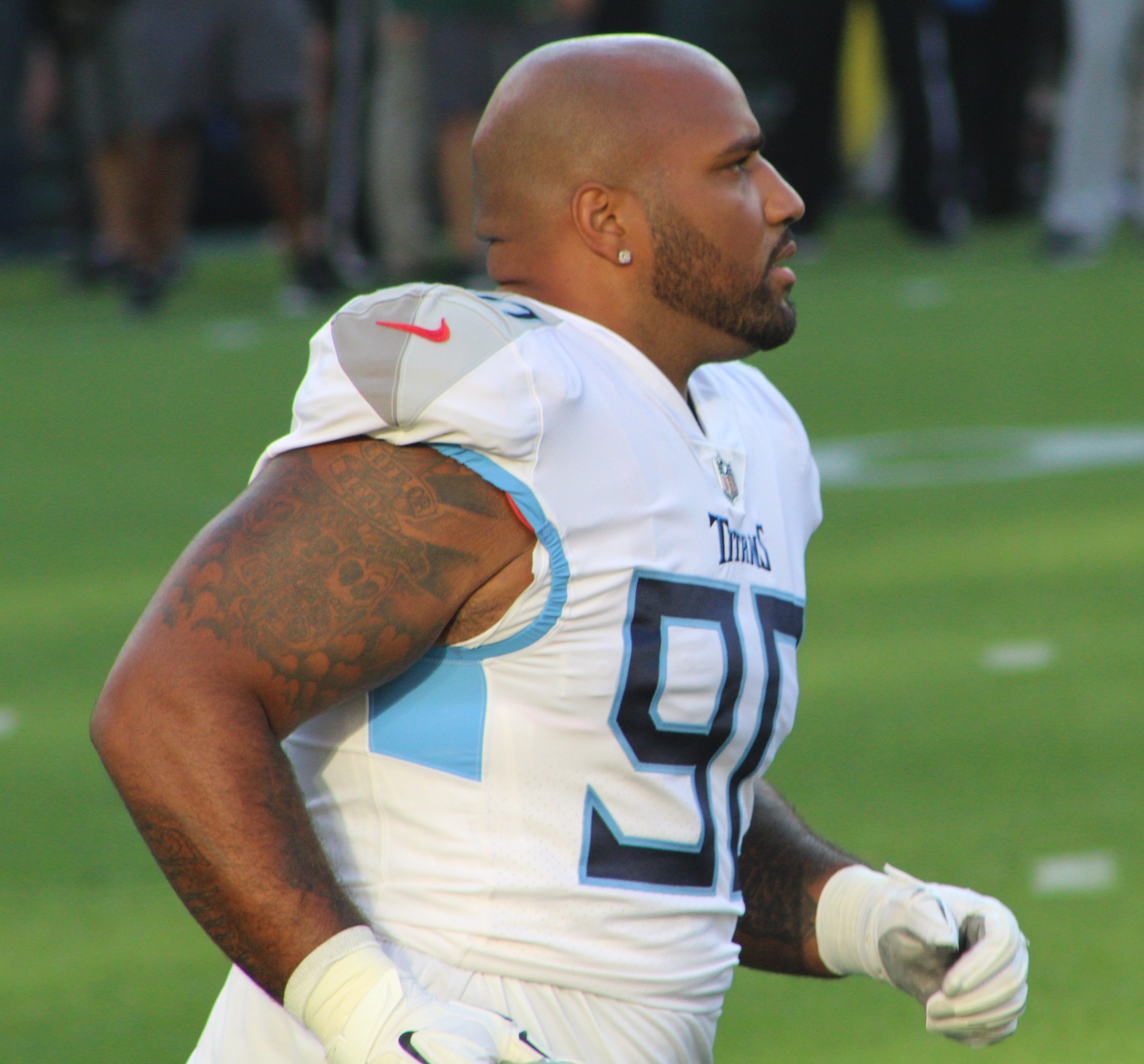
- Jones with the Tennessee Titans in 2018

No. 99 – New England Patriots
- Position: Defensive tackle
- Roster status: Active

Personal information
- Born: December 27, 1991 (age 34); Johnson City, New York, U.S.
- Listed height: 6 ft 4 in (1.93 m)
- Listed weight: 320 lb (145 kg)

Career information
- High school: Johnson City
- College: Penn State (2010–2013)
- NFL draft: 2014: 4th round, 112th overall pick

Career history
- Tennessee Titans (2014–2020); Carolina Panthers (2021); Buffalo Bills (2022–2025); New England Patriots (2026–present)

Awards and highlights
- First-team All-Big Ten (2013)

Career NFL statistics as of 2025
- Tackles: 372
- Sacks: 20
- Forced fumbles: 4
- Fumble recoveries: 3
- Pass deflections: 7
- Interceptions: 1
- Defensive touchdowns: 1
- Stats at Pro Football Reference

DaQuan Steven Jones (/ˈdeɪkwɑːn/ DAY-kwahn born December 27, 1991) is an American professional football defensive tackle for the New England Patriots of the National Football League (NFL). He played college football for the Penn State Nittany Lions and was selected by the Tennessee Titans in the fourth round of the 2014 NFL draft. Jones has also played for the Carolina Panthers and Buffalo Bills.

== Early life ==
Jones was born on December 27, 1991, in Johnson City, New York. He attended Johnson City Senior High School, where he played football and basketball as well as throwing the shot put.

=== Recruiting ===
College recruiting
Name	Hometown	School	Height	Weight	Commit date
DaQuan Jones; OG	Johnson City, New York	Johnson City, NY High School	6 ft 4 in (1.93 m)	302 lb (137 kg)	Jun 28, 2009
DaQuan Jones; OG	Recruit ratings: Scout: Rivals:				
Overall recruit ranking:
Note: In many cases, Scout, Rivals, 247Sports, On3, and ESPN may conflict in their listings of height and weight.; In these cases, the average was taken. ESPN grades are on a 100-point scale.; Sources: "2010 Team Ranking". Rivals.com.

Initially projected as an offensive guard, Jones committed to Penn State on June 28, 2009, after being recruited by Mike McQueary.

== College career ==
After limited action in his freshman and sophomore seasons, Jones was Penn State's starting defensive tackle opposite Jordan Hill in 2012, his junior season and recorded 22 tackles, two tackles for a loss, and 0.5 sacks.

During the subsequent offseason, Jones committed to losing weight to become quicker, and lost 25 pounds (11 kg) , coming into the 2013 season at 315 pounds (143 kg). In the first game of the season, his work paid off as he recorded nine tackles, three for a loss, and a sack. After the second game, Jones had already amassed 18 tackles, five tackles for a loss, and two sacks. After three games, his five tackles-for-loss led the Big Ten Conference. Halfway through the season, ESPN.com called Jones Penn State's defensive most valuable player.

== Professional career ==
Pre-draft measurables
Height	Weight	Arm length	Hand span	Wingspan	40-yard dash	10-yard split	20-yard split	20-yard shuttle	Three-cone drill	Vertical jump	Broad jump	Bench press
6 ft 3 3/4 in (1.92 m)	322 lb (146 kg)	33 1/2 in (0.85 m)	9 5/8 in (0.24 m)	6 ft 6 5/8 in (2.00 m)	5.35 s	1.85 s	3.07 s	4.65 s	7.73 s	27.5 in (0.70 m)	8 ft 5 in (2.57 m)	25 reps
All values from NFL Combine/Pro Day

=== Tennessee Titans ===
Jones was rated the number one overall defensive tackle by some analysts coming into the 2013 season. He was selected by the Tennessee Titans in the fourth round (112th overall) of the 2014 NFL draft. In Week 17 of the 2014 season, Jones recorded his first career sack against the Indianapolis Colts, tacking on four tackles including a forced fumble.

Jones started in all 16 games in 2015 and 2016. He scored his first touchdown on January 1, 2017, after recovering a fumble in the end zone.

In 2017, Jones started the first 12 games before suffering torn biceps and was placed on injured reserve on December 4, 2017. He finished the season with 31 tackles and a career-high 3.5 sacks.

On March 14, 2018, Jones signed a three-year, $21 million contract extension with the Titans.

On September 29, 2020, Jones was placed on the reserve/COVID-19 list by the team. He was activated on October 11. Jones finished his final season in Tennessee with a career-high 49 tackles.

=== Carolina Panthers ===
Jones signed a one-year contract with the Carolina Panthers on April 20, 2021. He started all 17 games in 2021, recording 38 tackles, one sack and a forced fumble.

=== Buffalo Bills ===
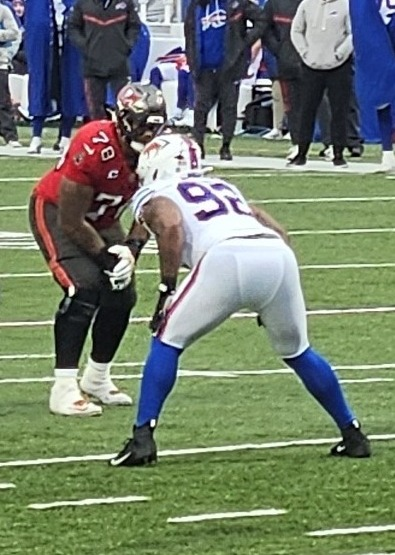
Jones playing with the Bills against the Tampa Bay Buccaneers in 2025

Jones signed a two-year contract with the Buffalo Bills on March 16, 2022.

In Week 5 of the 2023 season against the Jacksonville Jaguars, Jones suffered a pectoral injury in the 25–20 loss, and was placed on injured reserve on October 11. He was activated on December 30, 2023.

On March 12, 2024, Jones signed a two-year contract extension with the Bills.

=== New England Patriots ===
On September 11, 2026, Jones signed a one-year contract with the New England Patriots.

== NFL career statistics ==
Legend
	Led the league
**Bold**	Career high

=== Regular season ===
Year	Team	Games		Tackles							Interceptions						Fumbles				
Year	Team	GP	GS	Cmb	Solo	Ast	TFL	QBH	Sck	Sfty	PD	Int	Yds	Y/I	Lng	TD	FF	FR	Yds	Y/R	TD
2014	TEN	7	1	8	5	3	1	2	1.0	0	0	0	0	—	0	0	**1**	0	0	—	0
2015	TEN	16	16	45	25	20	3	3	0.0	0	0	0	0	—	0	0	0	**1**	0	**0.0**	0
2016	TEN	16	16	26	17	9	2	3	1.5	0	0	0	0	—	0	0	0	**1**	0	**0.0**	**1**
2017	TEN	12	12	31	19	12	**4**	5	**3.5**	0	0	0	0	—	0	0	0	0	0	—	0
2018	TEN	16	16	34	20	14	**4**	5	0.0	0	1	0	0	—	0	0	0	0	0	—	0
2019	TEN	16	16	42	21	**21**	0	2	1.0	0	**3**	0	0	—	0	0	0	0	0	—	0
2020	TEN	16	16	**49**	**29**	20	**4**	6	2.0	0	0	0	0	—	0	0	**1**	0	0	—	0
2021	CAR	17	17	38	19	19	1	6	1.0	0	0	0	0	—	0	0	**1**	0	0	—	0
2022	BUF	16	16	38	22	16	3	**11**	2.0	0	0	0	0	—	0	0	0	**1**	0	**0.0**	0
2023	BUF	7	7	16	8	8	4	5	2.5	0	0	0	0	—	0	0	0	0	0	—	0
2024	BUF	16	16	23	11	12	5	7	2.5	0	1	0	0	—	0	0	0	0	0	—	0
2025	BUF	12	12	22	11	11	3	8	3.0	0	2	**1**	**1**	**1.0**	**1**	0	**1**	0	0	—	0
Career		167	161	372	207	165	34	63	20.0	0	7	1	1	1.0	1	0	4	3	0	0.0	1

=== Postseason ===
Year	Team	Games		Tackles							Interceptions						Fumbles				
Year	Team	GP	GS	Cmb	Solo	Ast	TFL	QBH	Sck	Sfty	PD	Int	Yds	Y/I	Lng	TD	FF	FR	Yds	Y/R	TD
2019	TEN	3	3	**6**	2	**4**	0	**3**	0.5	0	0	0	0	—	0	0	0	0	0	—	0
2020	TEN	1	1	3	2	1	**1**	1	**1.0**	0	0	0	0	—	0	0	0	0	0	—	0
2022	BUF	1	1	1	0	1	0	1	0.0	0	0	0	0	—	0	0	0	0	0	—	0
2023	BUF	2	2	3	0	3	0	0	0.0	0	0	0	0	—	0	0	0	0	0	—	0
2024	BUF	3	3	**6**	**3**	3	0	0	0.0	0	0	0	0	—	0	0	0	0	0	—	0
2025	BUF	2	2	3	1	2	0	0	0.0	0	0	0	0	—	0	0	0	0	0	—	0
Career		12	12	22	8	14	1	5	1.5	0	0	0	0	—	0	0	0	0	0	—	0
