= Arthur J. Ruland =

American politician (1886–1973)

Member of the New York State Assembly from the Broome County district
- In office 1912–1912
- Preceded by: Charles S. Butler
- Succeeded by: Mortimer B. Edwards

Personal details
- Born: October 27, 1886 Nineveh, New York, U.S.
- Died: May 9, 1973 (aged 86) Montrose, Pennsylvania, U.S.
- Resting place: Floral Park Cemetery
- Party: Democratic
- Education: Syracuse University College of Law (LLB)
- Occupation: Politician; lawyer

Arthur J. Ruland (October 27, 1886 – May 9, 1973) was an American lawyer and politician from New York. He was a member of the New York State Assembly.

== Early life ==
Ruland was born on October 27, 1886, in Nineveh, New York, the son of George M. and Delphine A. Ruland. His father was a farmer. He graduated from Binghamton High School in 1904.

Ruland attended the Syracuse University College of Liberal Arts from 1904 to 1905 and the Syracuse University College of Law from 1905 to 1908. He graduated from the latter college with an LL.B. in 1908.

== Career ==
Ruland was admitted to the bar in 1908 and began practicing law in Binghamton. In the 1909–1910 school year he taught advanced English and oratory in the Binghamton High School. He was connected with the Empire Lyceum Bureau of Syracuse as a lecturer for two years, and would speak in various states until he began focusing more of his time on his growing legal practice. During World War I, he was an active four minute man. He was also special counsel for the State Department of Excise and local attorney for the American Railway Express Company and the Binghamton Real Estate Board.

Ruland was the Broome County attorney for the State Agricultural Department. In 1911, he was elected to the New York State Assembly as a Democrat, representing Broome County. He served in the Assembly in 1912. He lost the 1912 re-election to Republican Mortimer B. Edwards, and in 1913 he lost the election to the Assembly to Republican Simon P. Quick. In the 1942 United States House of Representatives election, he was the Democratic candidate in New York's 34th congressional district. He lost the election to Edwin Arthur Hall.

== Personal life ==
Ruland was a prominent member of the Improved Order of Red Men in New York, having been elected great junior sagamore for New York State in 1918, great senior sagamore in 1919, great sachem in 1920, great prophet in 1921, and great representative to the Great Council of the United States. He was a 32nd degree Freemason, president of the University Club from 1918 to 1919, and a member of Delta Sigma Rho and Phi Delta Phi. He was a member of the Methodist Episcopal Church.

Ruland died in the Asa Park Manor nursing home in Montrose, Pennsylvania on May 9, 1973. He was buried in Floral Park Cemetery.

New York State Assembly
Preceded by Charles S. Butler	New York State Assembly; Broome County; 1912	Succeeded by Mortimer B. Edwards
