= Harry C. Perkins =

American politician (1867–1926)

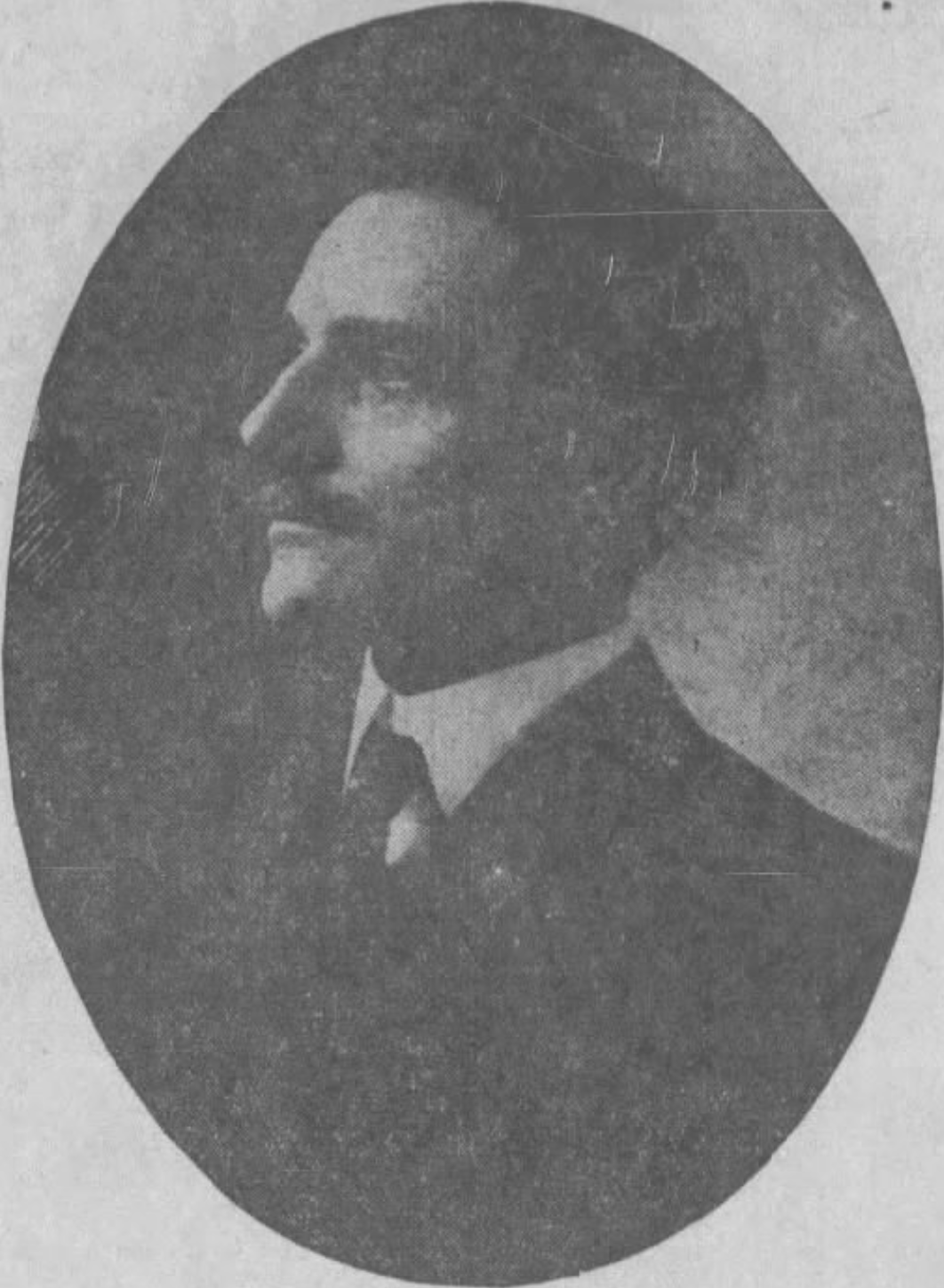
- Perkins in 1926 newspaper

Member of the New York State Assembly from the Broome County district
- In office 1908–1910
- Preceded by: James T. Rogers
- Succeeded by: Charles S. Butler

Personal details
- Born: May 28, 1867 Binghamton, New York, U.S.
- Died: March 7, 1926 (aged 58) Binghamton, New York, U.S.
- Resting place: Floral Park Cemetery; Johnson City, New York, U.S.
- Party: Republican
- Spouse: Anna Belle Fisher (m. 1897)
- Occupation: Politician; lawyer

Harry C. Perkins (May 28, 1867 – March 7, 1926) was an American lawyer and politician from New York.

== Life ==
Perkins was born on May 28, 1867, in Binghamton, New York, the son of Henry C. Perkins, a contractor and builder, and Mary E. Lloyd.

Perkins attended Binghamton Central High School, graduating from there in 1885. After spending a year as an editor for the Binghamton Republican, he began studying law with Millard & Stewart, prominent Binghamton lawyers. He was admitted to the bar in 1889 and opened his own law office in Binghamton. He later formed a partnership with Robert Swan Parsons, later a county judge and surrogate. The partnership lasted several years, and after it was dissolved Perkins practiced law alone outside of a brief partnership with Charles G. Blakeslee. He was an authority on corporation law and village law, serving as village attorney of Johnson City, Endicott, Vestal, Port Dickinson, and other municipalities at different points and sometimes simultaneously.

In 1895, Perkins was elected District Attorney of Broome County as a Republican. He was re-elected to the office in 1898 and served from 1896 to 1901. In 1907, he was elected to the New York State Assembly as a Republican, representing Broome County. He served in the Assembly in 1908, 1909, and 1910.

Perkins was a lay member of the Tabernacle Methodist Episcopal Church. He usually represented his church at the Wyoming Conference, served as president of the Wyoming Conference Layman's Association, and was a director of the Practical Bible Training School. He was a member of the Freemasons, the Binghamton Chamber of Commerce, and the Broome County Bar Association. In 1897, he married Anna Belle Fisher of Stamford.

Perkins died at home in Binghamton from a stroke on March 7, 1926. He was buried in Floral Park Cemetery in Johnson City.

New York State Assembly
Preceded by James T. Rogers	New York State Assembly; Broome County; 1908–1910	Succeeded by Charles S. Butler
