= John R. Clements =

Irish-American educator and hymnwriter

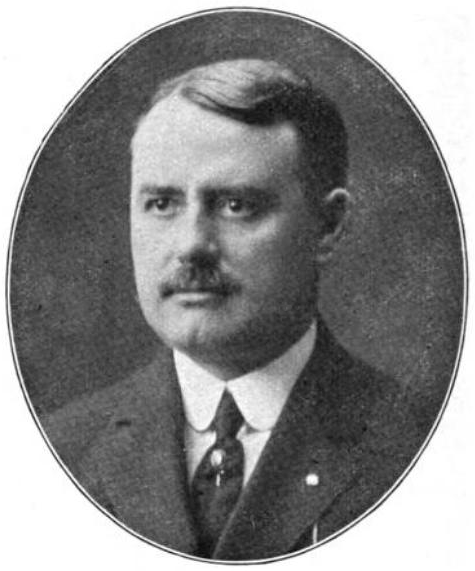
- Born: 28 November 1868; Newry, Ireland
- Died: 9 January 1946 (aged 77); Johnson City, New York
- Occupation(s): Educator, hymnwriter

John Ralston Clements (28 November 1868 – 9 January 1946) was an Irish-American educator and hymnwriter.

== Biography ==
John R. Clements was born in Newry, Ireland, on 28 November 1868. He immigrated young to America and grew up in the village of Liberty, NY, but, moved to Broome County, NY, in the mid-1880s. He was baptised by Evangelist Dwight L. Moody while Clements was in Binghamton, New York, in 1886.

Clements became the first president of Davis College, which was then called "Practical Bible College", a training school for Baptist evangelists. He led the school from the time of its conception, in a simple classroom on 47 Harrison Street, until 1914, when the Bible-training school and evangelistic academy had found permanent residence in Johnson City, NY.

Clements has written supposedly over 5,000 hymns, most of which were founded on soul redemption inside the love of God. As an example of this, the refrain from one of his hymns: "Weary soul, cease thy repining. Burdened one, God's ways are right. Every cloud has silver lining. God can give you songs by night."

He died in Johnson City on 9 January 1946.
