= Albert Mamary =

American educator and writer (1932–2011)

- Born: May 14, 1932
- Died: February 23, 2011 (aged 78)
- Education: Mansfield State Teacher's College; University of Minnesota; Columbia University
- Employer(s): Johnson City Central School District, Johnson City, New York
- Spouse: Mary

Albert Mamary (May 14, 1932 – February 23, 2011) was an American superintendent of schools, educational consultant, and writer.

== Education ==
Albert Mamary received his Bachelor of Arts degree from Mansfield State Teacher's College, before earning his Master's degree in mathematics from the University of Minnesota. After a period of study at Stanford University, he went on to earn his Doctor of Education degree from Columbia University.

== Career overview ==
Mamary's roles included math teacher, department chair, assistant superintendent, superintendent, educational consultant, and author. His activities included training educators in all 50 states as well as in other countries, including Italy, Spain, China, and Australia and co-authoring over two dozen successful textbooks in addition to writing books and articles on education.

== The Mamary Model ==
In his role as superintendent of the Johnson City School system, Mamary developed a school improvement model. In 1972, the year his model began to be implemented, Johnson City ranked “14th out of 14 schools in its county” and only 45-50 percent of its students in grades 1 through 8 scored at or above their grade level in math and reading. After five years, that number rose to about 70 percent. By 1984, the number of students scoring at or above grade level in math and reading reached 80–90 percent. Further evidence for the effectiveness of Mamary's model was that in 1986 the number of Johnson City School students receiving Regent's Diplomas was 77 percent, as compared to the state average of 43 percent and the national average of 59 percent.

== Creating the Ideal School ==
In 2007, Rowman & Littlefield Education published Mamary's book, Creating the Ideal School.
