= Charles S. Butler =

American physician and politician

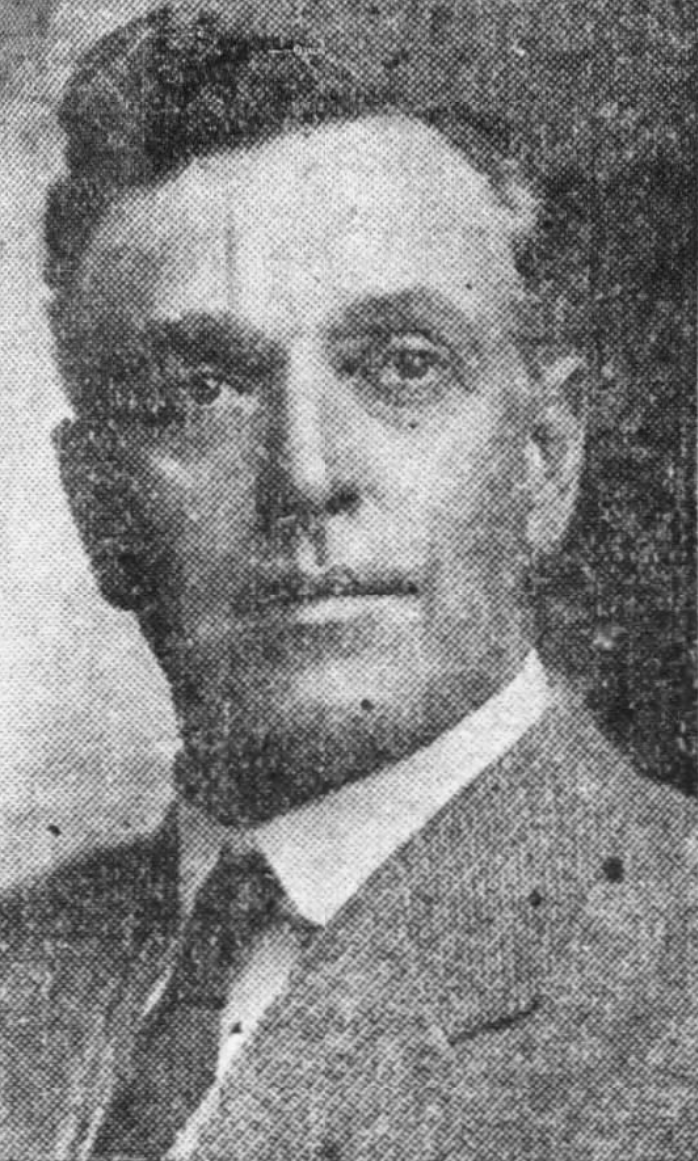
- Butler in 1910 newspaper

Member of the New York State Assembly from the Broome County district
- In office 1911–1911
- Preceded by: Harry C. Perkins
- Succeeded by: Arthur J. Ruland

Personal details
- Born: Charles Sylvester Butler; March 29, 1870 Colesville, New York, U.S.
- Died: May 26, 1946 (aged 76)
- Resting place: Spring Forest Cemetery
- Party: Republican
- Spouse(s): Jessie Bushnell (m. 1899) E. Irene
- Children: 3
- Education: Albany Medical College
- Occupation: Politician; physician

Charles Sylvester Butler (March 29, 1870 – May 26, 1946) was an American physician and politician from New York.

== Life ==
Butler was born on March 29, 1870, in Colesville, New York, the son of Dr. Andrew J. Butler and Mary J. Booth.

Butler attended Windsor High School and studied medicine with his father. He graduated from Albany Medical College in 1895. After graduating, he assisted his father's practice. He then moved to Nineveh. In 1898, after taking a course in the Polyclinic, he returned to Nineveh and was appointed surgeon of the Delaware & Hudson Railroad. In 1903, he moved to Harpursville.

In 1906, Butler was elected a coroner for Broome County. He held that office for three years and declined a nomination for a second term. In 1910, he was elected to the New York State Assembly as a Republican, representing Broome County. He served in the Assembly in 1911. He lost the 1911 re-election to the Assembly to Democratic candidate Arthur J. Ruland. He later moved to Binghamton. He practiced medicine there until his retirement in 1936. He resumed his medical practice during World War II.

Butler was a member of the Freemasons, the Royal Arch Masonry, the Improved Order of Red Men, and Phi Sigma Kappa. In 1899, he married Jessie Bushnell. By the time he died, he was married to E. Irene. His children were Andrew Payson, Charles Sylvester, and Thomas Wright.

Butler died in the City Hospital from bladder cancer on May 26, 1946. He was buried in Spring Forest Cemetery.

New York State Assembly
Preceded by Harry C. Perkins	New York State Assembly; Broome County; 1911	Succeeded by Arthur J. Ruland
