= Albany and Susquehanna Railroad =

Railroad in New York (1851–1870)

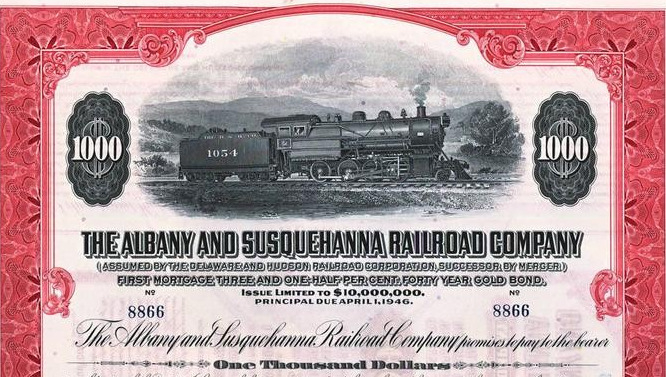

Overview
- Locale: New York
- Dates of operation: 1851; 174 years ago – 1870; 155 years ago
- Successor: Delaware and Hudson Railroad

Technical
- Track gauge: 6 ft (1,829 mm)
- Length: 143 mi (230 km)

The Albany and Susquehanna Railroad (A&S) was a 6 ft (1,829 mm) broad gauge railroad from Albany to Binghamton, New York, operating 1851 to 1870. It was subsequently leased by the Delaware and Hudson Canal Company and later merged into the Delaware and Hudson Railroad.

== History ==
Construction began on April 19, 1851, from Albany to Schoharie Junction, New York, a 35-mile (56 km) stretch that required 12 years to complete. In 1869, the line was extended to Binghamton, lengthening the railroad to 142 miles (229 km).

== A&S vs. Erie railroad war ==
A relatively small road, the A&S connected with four larger ones heading south to the Pennsylvania coal mines. One of these was the Erie, owned by financier Jay Gould, who realized that the A&S might be used to bring coal to New England markets. He decided to add the A&S line to the Erie.

In the summer of 1869, Jay Gould and Jim Fisk began to buy up shares in A&S, aiming to accumulate a controlling interest and install their own people to the board and take over. A&S president Joseph H. Ramsey reacted by issuing to his supporters thousands of shares that had been sitting on the company's books. Ramsey then had the books spirited from his office and buried in the Albany Cemetery. Incensed, Gould and Fisk had him suspended as president of the A&S by a judge they controlled on the New York State Supreme Court, George G. Barnard. Gould and Fisk also conspired to falsely arrest Ramsey, Henry Smith, William L. M. Phelps, and Robert H. Pruyn, the latter three of whom were also executives associated with the Albany and Susquehanna Railroad. Ramsey applied to Albany judge Rufus W. Peckham, both sides trying to force the A&S into the control of a partisan recipient. Peckham succeeded, getting his order in first by a matter of minutes.

Fisk stormed the office of the A&S in Albany with hired thugs; he was taken to a police station by an A&S employee masquerading as a policeman. As soon as he was free from jail, Fisk returned to the A&S headquarters with a restraining order signed by Judge Barnard and a new set of thugs. They took over the A&S station at Binghamton, stole a train, and set off down the line to Albany, seizing stations as they went. A&S men flipped a switch to derail the cars. Fisk and his recruits met their adversaries, the men of the A&S, in a tunnel near Harpursville, where they attacked each other with all manner of weapons until the governor ordered state militia to take charge of the road.

John Pierpont Morgan, who had arranged a $500,000 mortgage for the road and been appointed a trustee, arrived in New York on September 1, 1869 and was recruited by Ramsey's supporters. In the name of Dabney, Morgan bought six hundred shares of A&S and made contact with all the shareholders loyal to Ramsey, ensuring that they or their proxies would be present at the annual meeting held in Albany on September 7, 1869. Personally supervising the voting, Morgan was elected a vice-president and director of the road. Gould and Fisk counteracted by voting in their own men in separate elections. The case reached the New York State Supreme Court which ruled in favour of the Ramsey group's elections.

On February 24, 1870, Morgan leased the A&S to the Delaware and Hudson Canal Company for 99 years, taking the company out of play.

On July 2, 1945, the company was merged into the Delaware and Hudson Railroad.

In 2003, Canadian Pacific proposed to abandon the 9.8-mile (15.8 km) branch section from Voorheesville, New York, to Albany. Albany County filed a railbanking application, and purchased the right-of-way in 2009.

== See also ==
- Erie War
- Railroad Wars
