= Danijal Brković =

Bosnian-American footballer (born 1991)

Personal information
- Full name: Danijal Brković
- Date of birth: 3 June 1991 (age 35)
- Place of birth: Dubrovnik, SR Croatia, SFR Yugoslavia
- Height: 1.81 m (5 ft 11 in)
- Position: Forward

Team information
- Current team: SG Westend Frankfurt

Youth career
- 2010–2011: Velež Mostar

Senior career*
| Years | Team | Apps | (Gls) |
| 2011–2012 | Velež Mostar | 24 | (11) |
| 2012–2014 | Željezničar Sarajevo | 13 | (6) |
| 2014–2016 | Olimpik | 51 | (23) |
| 2016–2017 | Čelik Zenica | 27 | (15) |
| 2018 | BV Essen | 15 | (9) |
| 2018–2019 | Radnik Bijeljina | 9 | (4) |
| 2019 | IFK Åmål | | |
| 2019- | SG Westend Frankfurt | 28 | (25) |
- * Club domestic league appearances and goals as of 17:08, 31 May 2019 (UTC)

Danijal Brkovic (born 3 June 1991) is a Bosnian-American footballer who plays as a forward for SG Westend Frankfurt in Germany.

== Early years ==
Danijal Brković was born on June 3, 1991, in Dubrovnik, Croatia. He is the youngest of his two brothers Anes and Haris. They moved to Binghamton, New York when he was 9-years old, and eventually he became an American citizen. Playing for the Johnson City High School, Brković found success as a centre-forward and as a winger. After high school, he decided not to go to the college and instead went to Europe in hopes of becoming a professional player.

== Club career ==
Brkovic first played with FK Velez's youth team, on his mother native city, Mostar, and in late 2010, he signed a professional contract with the team.

Brković professional debut was on April 9, 2011, in a league match against NK Zvijezda Gradačac when he came in the game's 67th minute replacing Damir Rovčanin.

In February 2019, Brković moved to Sweden and joined IFK Åmål.
