= Tunnel, New York =

- Hamlet
- Location within New York Location within the United States
- Coordinates: 42°12′58″N 75°43′36″W
- Country: United States
- State: New York
- County: Broome
- Town: Colesville
- Elevation: 1,388 ft (423 m)
- Time zone: UTC-5 (Eastern (EST))
  - Summer (DST): UTC-4 (EDT)
- ZIP code: 13848
- Area code: 607
- GNIS feature ID: 967942

Tunnel is a hamlet within the town of Colesville in Broome County, New York, United States. The community is 15 miles (24 km) by road northeast of Binghamton. Tunnel has a post office with ZIP code 13848.

The community is located near the west portal of the Belden Tunnel and formerly contained hotels and a railroad depot. Workers constructing the railroad tunnel during the 1860s chose to settle at this location.
