= Dino Pedrone =

American pastor and university administrator

Dr. Dino J. Pedrone
- Davis College Inauguration (2008)
- Organization: Dino Pedrone Ministries
- Children: Dr. JoAnna Oster, (daughter) Dr. Jonathan Pedrone, (son)
- Website: www.dinopedroneministries.org

Dino J. Pedrone is the former President of Davis College. He served as Senior Pastor of New Testament Baptist Church in the South Florida from 1995 to 2009. He oversaw New Testament Baptist Church's two locations and its two schools Dade Christian School and the Master's Academy. He was also President of the Florida Association of Christian Colleges and Schools (FACCS) and its parent organization, the International Association of Christian Colleges and Schools. Pedrone became the ninth president of Davis College in July 2008 and served in that capacity for a decade until 2018. He is the author of 16 books and booklets including Directions, the Family Life Devotional booklet, Hope Grows In Winter, and Looking Ahead. He founded and edited the Life at School Christian Journal produced by FACCS. His radio ministry included “The Bible Speaks”, which reportedly reached a quarter of the English-speaking world, “Timely Truths”, which could be heard throughout South Florida, and “The Caring Place", which could be heard in South Florida as well. His television ministry included “The Open Door Hour” and “The Bible Speaks”. He and his wife Bobbi have four grown children and two grandchildren.

== Early life ==
Pedrone received his Bachelor of Theology from Evangelical Bible College, his Doctor of Theology from Clarksville School of Theology, and his Doctor of Ministry from Luther Rice Seminary. He began to serve in ministry in 1967 and served as Senior Pastor of The Open Door Church in Chambersburg, PA until 1995.

== Davis College Presidency ==
On November 22, 2009, Dino Pedrone preached his final message and resigned from being Senior Pastor of New Testament Baptist Church where he had pastored since 1995 to assume the role of full-time role of president of Davis College. In 2009, he moved to Binghamton, New York, and served as president of Davis College until 2018.

== Bibliography ==
- True I.D. (2008)
- What In The World Is God Doing (2009)
- He Must Be The One (2011)
- Mentoring the Next Generation (2012)
- The Influence of Peter (2012)
- God Is Doing Something Even When You Don't Know It (2014)
