= Howard G. Garrison =

US Army major general

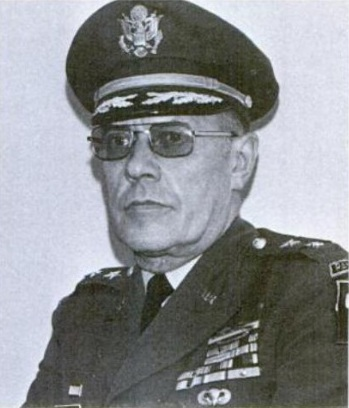
- Garrison in 1977
- Born: May 2, 1921; Vestal Center, New York, US
- Died: September 14, 2007 (aged 86); Glencoe, Alabama, US
- Education: Syracuse University (attended); United States Army Command and General Staff College; United States Army War College
- Spouse: Helen Cannon (m. 1942–2002)
- Children: 1
- Military career
- Service: United States Army; New York Army National Guard
- Service years: 1939–1978
- Rank: Major General
- Units: U.S. Army Infantry Branch; U.S. Army Armor Branch
- Commands: Company F, Chinese Combat Command; 2nd Battalion, 108th Infantry Regiment; 2nd Brigade, 27th Armored Division; 27th Brigade, 50th Armored Division; Emergency Management Section, New York National Guard; 42nd Infantry Division
- Conflicts: World War II; Occupation of Japan
- Awards: Bronze Star Medal with "V" device Meritorious Service Medal
- Other work: Department Manager, IBM

Howard G. Garrison (2 May 1921 – 14 September 2007) was a career officer in the United States Army. A veteran of World War II, he was a longtime member of the New York Army National Guard and attained the rank of major general. Garrison served from 1939 to 1978, and his career culminated with command of the 42nd Infantry Division. His awards and decorations included the Bronze Star Medal with "V" device for valor, Meritorious Service Medal, Combat Infantryman Badge, and Parachutist Badge.

A native of Vestal Center, New York, Garrison was raised and educated in Johnson City and graduated from Johnson City High School in 1939. He joined the National Guard in 1939, and was federalized for active duty during World War II, and he completed officer training in 1942. Garrison served in the China Burma India theater during the war and took part in the post-war Occupation of Japan. After the war, he began a civilian career with IBM and attended Syracuse University.

Garrison rejoined the National Guard after the war and advanced through the ranks to colonel as commander of a battalion, and two brigades. He was assigned as assistant division commander of the 42nd Infantry Division in February 1970, and in March 1971 he was promoted to brigadier general. He was assigned to command the Emergency Command Section at the New York National Guard's state headquarters in December 1971, and in July 1973 he was promoted to major general. Garrison was appointed commander of the 42nd Infantry Division in March 1977, and he remained in this post until his July 1978 retirement.

In retirement, Garrison resided in Johnson City until moving to Anniston, Alabama in 1989. In 2005, he relocated to Glencoe, Alabama. Garrison died in Glencoe on 14 September 2007.

== Early life ==
Howard G. Garrison was born in Vestal Center, New York on 2 May 1921, the son of and Elias H. Garrison and Genevieve "Jennie" (Gurney) Garrison. He was raised and educated in Vestal Center and Johnson City; he was a 1936 graduate of C. Fred Johnson Junior High School and a 1939 graduate of Johnson City High School.

In March 1939, Garrison joined the New York Army National Guard when he enlisted as a private in Company E, 10th Infantry Regiment, which was based in Binghamton. In 1940, his regiment was called to federal active duty in anticipation of U.S. entry into World War II. Garrison continued to serve in the redesignated 106th Infantry Regiment, and he advanced to sergeant before being accepted for officer training. He attended Officer Candidate School at Fort Benning, Georgia, from which he graduated in November 1942. At graduation, he was commissioned as a second lieutenant of Infantry.

=== Family ===
In 1942, Garrison married Helen Cannon of Anniston, Alabama. They were married until her death in 2002 and were the parents of a son, Steven.

== Start of career ==
After receiving his commission, Garrison was assigned to the 101st Airborne Division at Fort Bragg, North Carolina. He was subsequently assigned to the 5307th Composite Unit (Merrill's Marauders). He served in the China Burma India theater, received promotion to first lieutenant in 1944, and commanded Company F, Chinese Combat Command, which fought the Japanese alongside China's People's Liberation Army. He was promoted to captain in 1945 and served with the 475th Infantry Regiment (Long Range Penetration), which fought alongside units of China's National Revolutionary Army. He subsequently served as a liaison officer to the National Revolutionary Army, after which he performed detached service with the Office of Strategic Services during the Occupation of Japan. He was discharged from active duty in March 1946 and was assigned to the Organized Reserve Corps.

=== Military education ===
Garrison's professional military education included:

- Infantry Officer Advanced Course (1952)
- Air Ground Operations School (1953, 1975)
- Armor Officer Refresher Course (1955, 1964, 1968, 1969)
- United States Army Command and General Staff College Associate Course (1959)
- Senior Officer Preventive Maintenance Course (1960)
- Senior Officer Advanced Operations Course (1961)
- Field Artillery Field Grade Officer Refresher Course (1968)
- Senior Officer Civil Disturbance Orientation Course (1968)
- Division Refresher Course (1970)
- University of Southern California Aviation Safety Orientation Course (1970)
- Infantry Field Grade Officer Refresher Course (1970)
- United States Army War College (1974)

== Continued career ==
After his wartime service, Garrison began a civilian career as a department manager with IBM, and he attended Syracuse University in 1946. In November 1947, Garrison rejoined the New York National Guard, where he took part in the reorganization of 2nd Battalion, 108th Infantry Regiment. He was later appointed the battalion's plans, operations, and training officer (S-3), and he was promoted to major in September 1952. After his promotion, he was appointed to command the battalion. He remained in command until February 1964, and he was promoted to lieutenant colonel in June 1956. In February 1964, he was assigned to command 2nd Brigade, 27th Armored Division, and he was promoted to colonel in November. In February 1968, a reorganization of the National Guard led to his assignment as commander of 27th Brigade, 50th Armored Division.

In February 1970, Garrison was assigned as assistant division commander of the 42nd Infantry Division and he was promoted to brigadier general in March 1971. In December 1971, Garrison was assigned to command the Emergency Command Section at the New York National Guard's state headquarters, and he was promoted to major general in July 1973. In March 1977, Garrison was assigned to command the 42nd Division, which he led until being succeeded by Joseph A. Healey and retiring from the military in July 1978.

After retiring in 1978, Garrison lived in Johnson City until moving to Anniston, Alabama in 1989. In 2005, he moved to Glencoe, Alabama. Garrison's civic and professional memberships included the Veterans of Foreign Wars, American Legion, Kiwanis Club, U.S. Armor Association, Association of the United States Army, and Militia Association of New York. He died in Glencoe on 14 September 2007.

=== Awards ===
Garrison's awards included the: Bronze Star Medal with "V" device for valor; Meritorious Service Medal; Good Conduct Medal; American Defense Service Medal; American Campaign Medal; Asiatic–Pacific Campaign Medal with 6 battle stars; World War II Victory Medal; Army of Occupation Medal; Armed Forces Reserve Medal; Parachutist Badge; and Combat Infantryman Badge.

== Dates of rank ==
- Major General (retired), 31 July 1978
- Major General, 20 July 1973
- Brigadier General, 12 March 1971
- Colonel, 21 September 1964
- Lieutenant Colonel, 25 June 1956
- Major, 2 September 1952
- Captain, 23 June 1945
- First Lieutenant, 26 October 1944
- Second Lieutenant, 25 November 1942
- Enlisted service, 9 March 1939 to 24 November 1942
