= Glencoe, Alabama =

City in the United States

Glencoe
- City
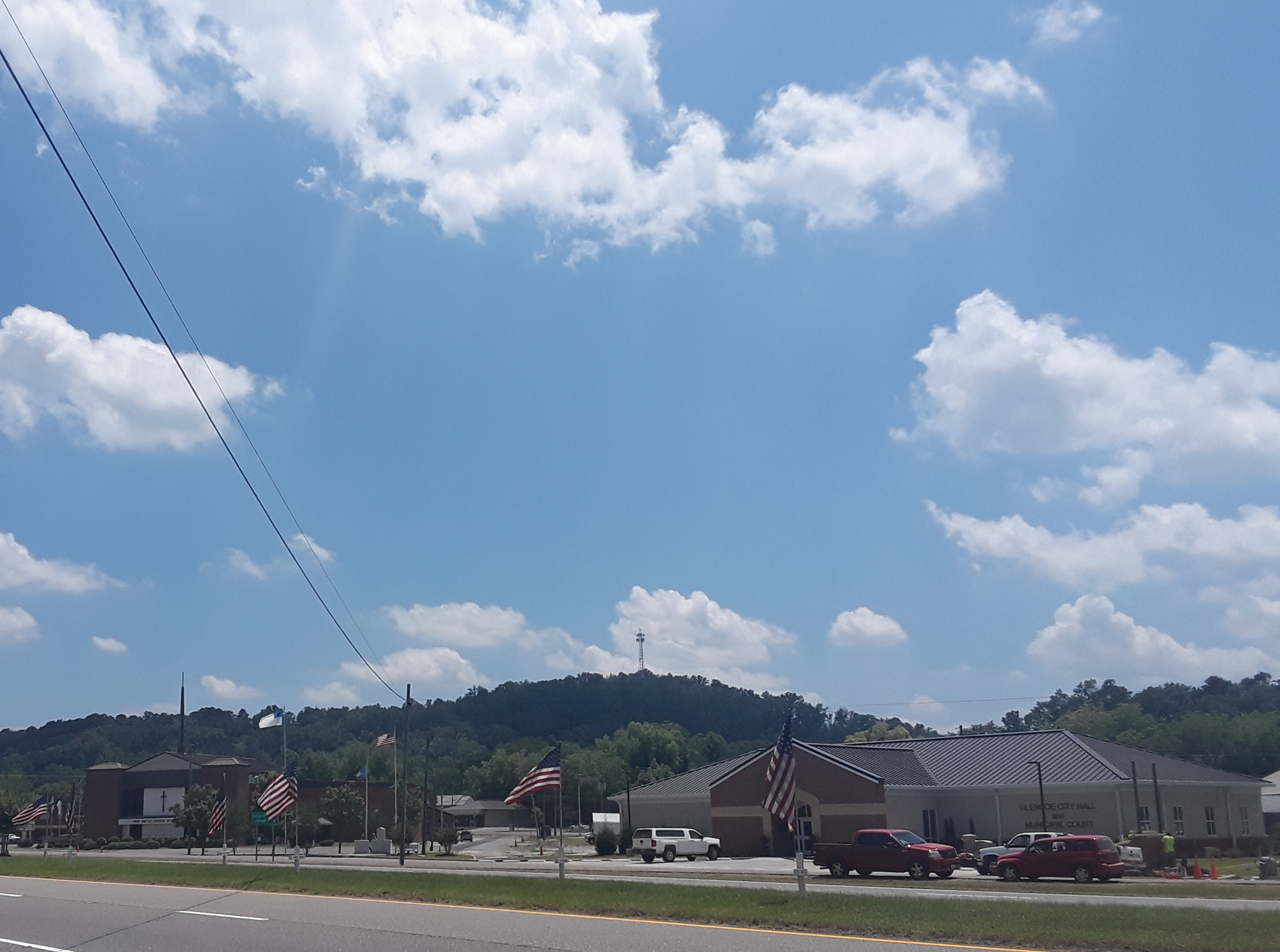
- Glencoe city hall and surroundings

- Seal

- Location of Glencoe in Calhoun County and Etowah County, Alabama.
- Coordinates: 33°58′12″N 85°56′12″W
- Country: United States
- State: Alabama
- Counties: Etowah, Calhoun

Area
  - Total: 17.08 sq mi (44.24 km^{2})
  - Land: 17.00 sq mi (44.03 km^{2})
  - Water: 0.081 sq mi (0.21 km^{2})
- Elevation: 561 ft (171 m)

Population (2020)
  - Total: 5,372
  - Density: 316.0/sq mi (122.01/km^{2})
- Time zone: UTC-6 (Central (CST))
  - Summer (DST): UTC-5 (CDT)
- ZIP code: 35905
- Area code: 256
- FIPS code: 01-29992
- GNIS feature ID: 2403701
- Website: www.cityofglencoe.org

Glencoe (local pronunciation "Glin-ko") is a city in Calhoun and Etowah counties in the U.S. state of Alabama. It is part of the Gadsden Metropolitan Statistical Area. The city incorporated in 1939. As of the 2020 census, Glencoe had a population of 5,372.

== Geography ==
According to the U.S. Census Bureau, the city has a total area of 17.0 square miles (44.1 km^{2}), of which 16.9 square miles (43.9 km^{2}) is land and 0.077 square miles (0.2 km^{2}), or 0.49%, is water.

== Demographics ==
Historical population
Census	Pop.	Note	%±
1940	669		—
1950	1,466		119.1%
1960	2,592		76.8%
1970	2,901		11.9%
1980	4,647		60.2%
1990	4,670		0.5%
2000	5,152		10.3%
2010	5,160		0.2%
2020	5,372		4.1%
U.S. Decennial Census; 2013 Estimate

=== Racial and ethnic composition ===
Glencoe city, Alabama – Racial and ethnic composition Note: the US Census treats Hispanic/Latino as an ethnic category. This table excludes Latinos from the racial categories and assigns them to a separate category. Hispanics/Latinos may be of any race.
Race / Ethnicity (NH = Non-Hispanic)	Pop 1980	Pop 1990	Pop 2000	Pop 2010	Pop 2020	% 1980	% 1990	% 2000	% 2010	% 2020
White alone (NH)	4,496	4,557	4,981	4,949	4,867	96.75%	97.58%	96.68%	95.91%	90.60%
Black or African American alone (NH)	69	94	89	69	154	1.48%	2.01%	1.73%	1.34%	2.87%
Native American or Alaska Native alone (NH)	6	7	15	14	21	0.13%	0.15%	0.29%	0.27%	0.39%
Asian alone (NH)	6	0	9	25	55	0.13%	0.00%	0.17%	0.48%	1.02%
Native Hawaiian or Pacific Islander alone (NH)	x	x	1	0	1	x	x	0.02%	0.00%	0.02%
Other race alone (NH)	0	6	0	4	15	0.00%	0.13%	0.00%	0.08%	0.28%
Mixed race or Multiracial (NH)	x	x	39	57	173	x	x	0.76%	1.10%	3.22%
Hispanic or Latino (any race)	70	6	18	42	86	1.51%	0.13%	0.35%	0.81%	1.60%
Total	4,647	4,670	5,152	5,160	5,372	100.00%	100.00%	100.00%	100.00%	100.00%

=== 2020 census ===
As of the 2020 census, Glencoe had a population of 5,372. There were 2,099 households and 1,384 families. The median age was 47.0 years. 20.0% of residents were under the age of 18 and 23.8% of residents were 65 years of age or older. For every 100 females there were 92.5 males, and for every 100 females age 18 and over there were 88.0 males age 18 and over.

57.3% of residents lived in urban areas, while 42.7% lived in rural areas.

There were 2,099 households in Glencoe, of which 28.0% had children under the age of 18 living in them. Of all households, 53.8% were married-couple households, 15.2% were households with a male householder and no spouse or partner present, and 27.0% were households with a female householder and no spouse or partner present. About 26.1% of all households were made up of individuals and 15.0% had someone living alone who was 65 years of age or older.

There were 2,294 housing units, of which 8.5% were vacant. The homeowner vacancy rate was 1.6% and the rental vacancy rate was 9.0%.

=== 2010 census ===
As of the census of 2010, there were 5,160 people, 2,129 households, and 1,488 families living in the city. The population density was 305 inhabitants per square mile (118/km^{2}). There were 2,270 housing units at an average density of 133.5 per square mile (51/km^{2}). The racial makeup of the city was 96.5% White, 1.3% Black or African American, 0.3% Native American, 0.5% Asian, 0.0% Pacific Islander, 0.2% from other races, and 1.1% from two or more races. 0.8% of the population were Hispanic or Latino of any race.

There were 2,129 households, out of which 25.3% had children under the age of 18 living with them, 55.5% were married couples living together, 10.1% had a female householder with no husband present, and 30.1% were non-families. 26.6% of all households were made up of individuals, and 12.8% had someone living alone who was 65 years of age or older. The average household size was 2.42 and the average family size was 2.92.

In the city, the age distribution of the population shows 21.2% under the age of 18, 8.4% from 18 to 24, 23.2% from 25 to 44, 30.1% from 45 to 64, and 17.2% who were 65 years of age or older. The median age was 42.7 years. For every 100 females, there were 96.0 males. For every 100 females age 18 and over, there were 101.0 males.

The median income for a household in the city was $53,279, and the median income for a family was $61,810. Males had a median income of $53,295 versus $31,481 for females. The per capita income for the city was $24,531. About 3.5% of families and 5.2% of the population were below the poverty line, including 6.7% of those under age 18 and 5.8% of those age 65 or over.

=== 2000 census ===
As of the census of 2000, there were 5,152 people, 2,000 households, and 1,526 families living in the city. The population density was 320.6 inhabitants per square mile (123.8/km^{2}). There were 2,132 housing units at an average density of 132.7 per square mile (51.2/km^{2}). The racial makeup of the city was 96.93% White, 1.73% Black or African American, 0.29% Native American, 0.17% Asian, 0.02% Pacific Islander, 0.10% from other races, and 0.76% from two or more races. 0.35% of the population were Hispanic or Latino of any race.

There were 2,000 households, out of which 32.2% had children under the age of 18 living with them, 63.7% were married couples living together, 9.1% had a female householder with no husband present, and 23.8% were non-families. 21.9% of all households were made up of individuals, and 10.1% had someone living alone who was 65 years of age or older. The average household size was 2.48 and the average family size was 2.89.

In the city, the age distribution of the population shows 22.2% under the age of 18, 7.3% from 18 to 24, 27.7% from 25 to 44, 25.3% from 45 to 64, and 17.5% who were 65 years of age or older. The median age was 41 years. For every 100 females, there were 92.2 males. For every 100 females age 18 and over, there were 89.3 males.

The median income for a household in the city was $38,385, and the median income for a family was $46,283. Males had a median income of $31,893 versus $26,652 for females. The per capita income for the city was $18,577. About 4.9% of families and 6.7% of the population were below the poverty line, including 8.0% of those under age 18 and 7.2% of those age 65 or over.

== Notable people ==
- Shannon Camper, Miss Alabama 2004
- Howard G. Garrison, US Army major general
- Mickey Gibbs, racing driver
- Jana Sanderson, Miss Alabama 2000
