= Johnson City Central School District =

School district in Johnson City, New York, United States

Address
- 666 Reynolds Road Johnson City, New York, 13790; United States
- Coordinates: 42.1347°N 75.9690°W

District information
- Type: State school
- Grades: Pre-K-12
- Superintendent: Eric Race
- Asst. superintendent(s): Elisa Eaton; Joseph Guccia
- School board: Nicholas J. Matyas, president; Jeannette Farr, vice president; Stephen Barrows; Shannon Edmondson; Richard (Rocky) G. Martinez; Amber Stallman; Milton Harding; David Gougen
- Schools: 3
- NCES District ID: 3615900
- District ID: NY-031502060000

Students and staff
- Students: 2178 (2024)
- Athletic conference: Southern Tier Athletic Conference
- District mascot: Rory the Wildcat
- Colors: Maroon & White

Other information
- Website: www.jcschools.com

Johnson City Central School District is a school district in Johnson City, New York, United States.

As of June 30th, 2024, the Johnson City Central School District had a total student enrollment of 2,178 students, with 169 ELL students.

== Schools ==
=== High school ===
- Johnson City High School, 666 Reynolds Road, Johnson City, NY 13790

=== Middle school ===
- Johnson City Middle School, 601 Columbia Drive, Johnson City, NY 13790

=== Elementary school ===
- Johnson City Elementary School, 601 Columbia Drive, Johnson City, NY 13790

== Creating the Ideal School ==
Albert Mamary was superintendent of schools in Johnson City from 1982 to 1992 and a proponent of outcome-based education. In 2007, Rowman & Littlefield Education published Mamary's book on his approach to improving school outcomes in a school district with many an economically deprived families, Creating the Ideal School.
