= Nathaniel Cole Park Pond =

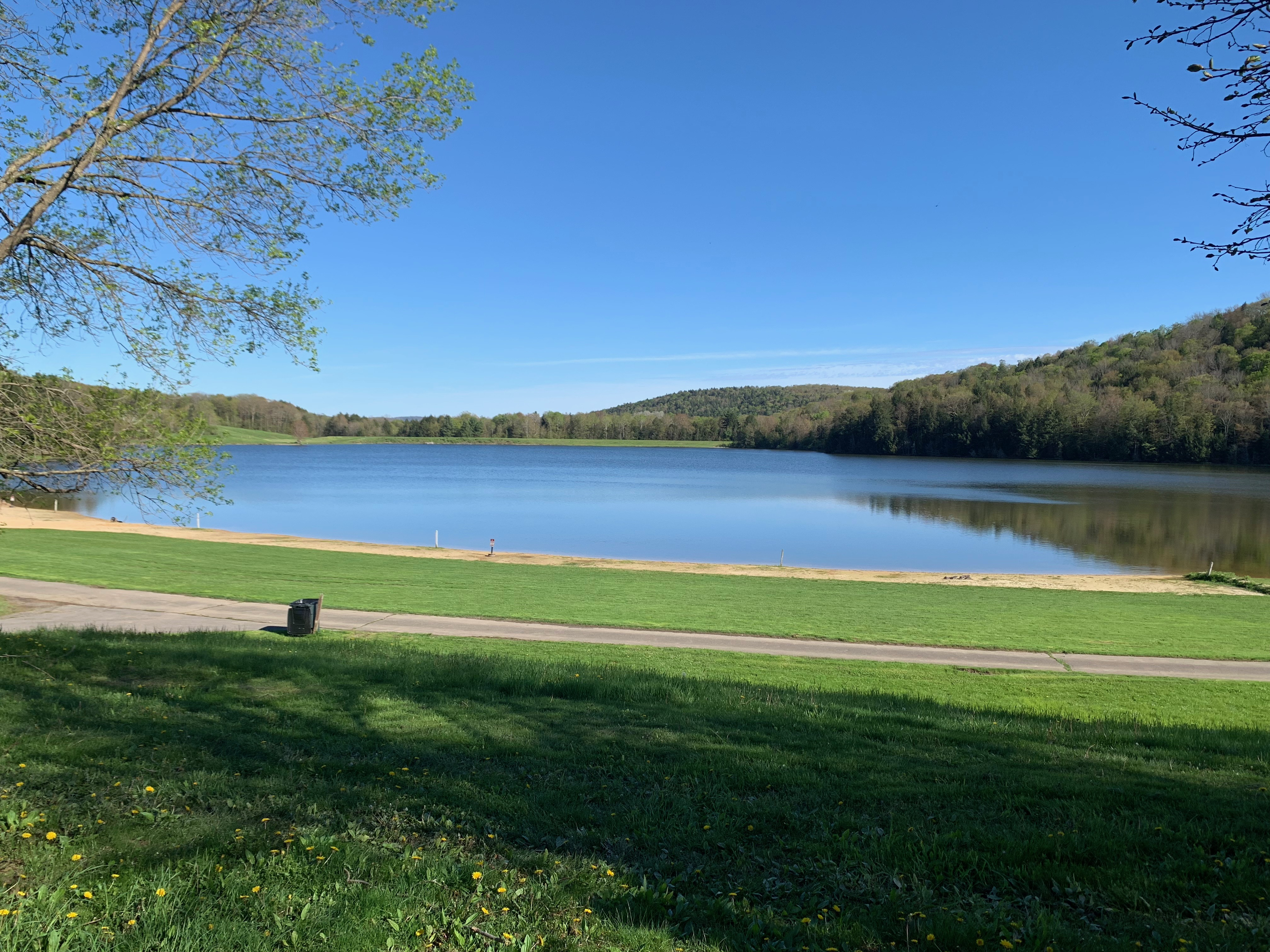
- Nathaniel Cole Park Pond in May

- Location within New York Location within the United States
- Location: Broome County, New York, United States
- Coordinates: 42°08′30.4″N 75°42′21.1″W
- Type: Lake
- Basin countries: United States
- Surface area: 55 acres (0.22 km^{2})
- Average depth: 10 ft (3.0 m)
- Max. depth: 26 ft (7.9 m)
- Surface elevation: 1,280 ft (390 m)
- Settlements: West Colesville, New York

Nathaniel Cole Park Pond is a man-made lake located by West Colesville, New York. Fish species present in the lake include pumpkinseed sunfish, and largemouth bass.
