= Harpursville United Methodist Church =

Historic church in New York, United States

- U.S. National Register of Historic Places
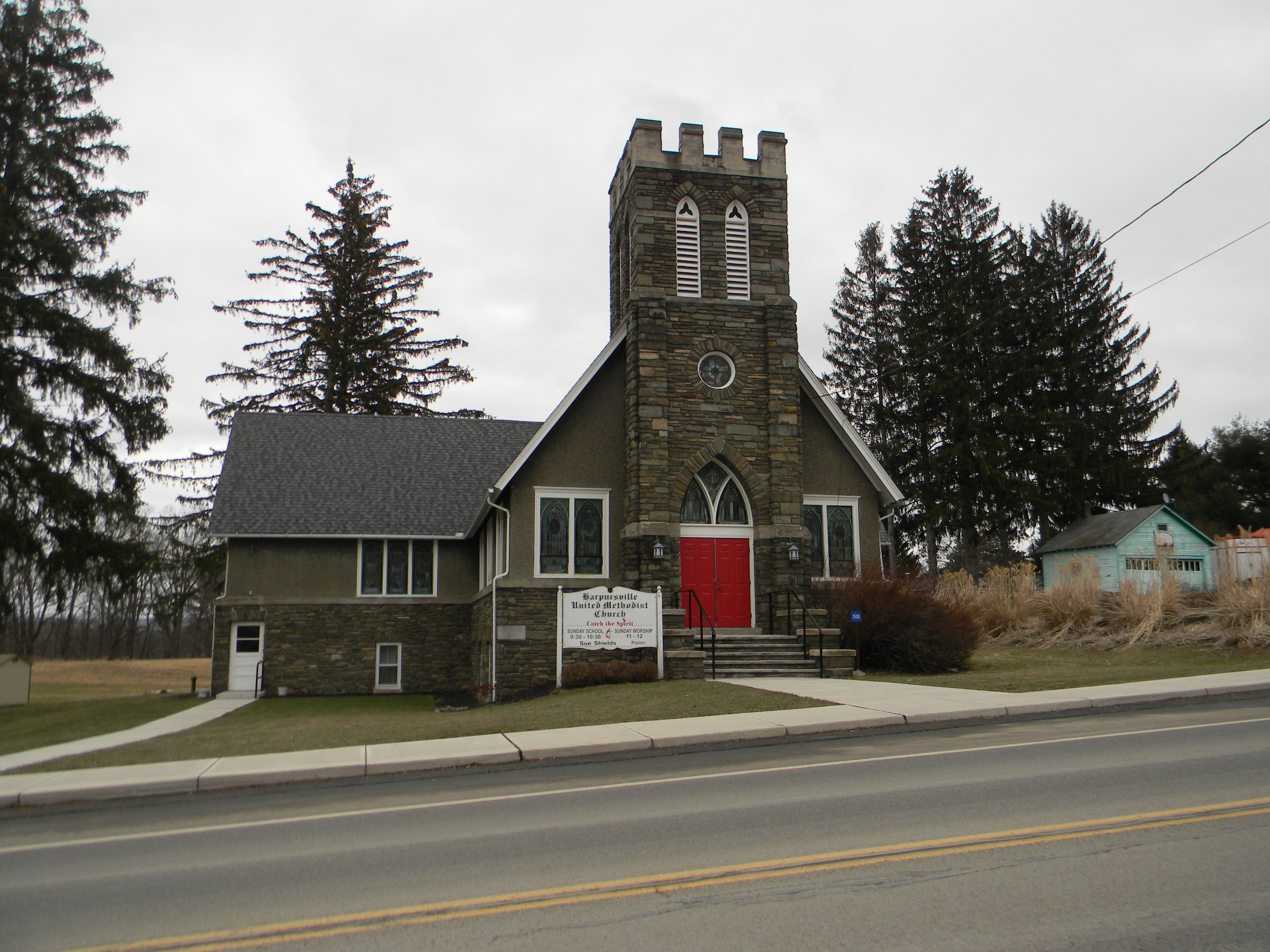
- Harpursville United Methodist Church, February 2012

- Location within New York Location within the United States
- Location: NY 79, Harpursville, New York
- Coordinates: 42°10′41″N 75°37′28″W
- Area: less than one acre
- Built: 1920
- Architectural style: Late 19th And 20th Century Revivals
- NRHP reference No.: 05001532
- Added to NRHP: January 18, 2006

Harpursville United Methodist Church is a historic United Methodist church located at Harpursville in Broome County, New York. It is a small, T-shaped one-story building built in 1920. The foundation, walls, and entrance tower are built of stone, while the upper portion of the walls are of wood-frame construction clad in stucco. The building embodies features typical of the Gothic Revival style.

It was listed on the National Register of Historic Places in 2006.
