= Baptist Convention of Pennsylvania/South Jersey =

The Baptist Convention of Pennsylvania/South Jersey, also known as the Baptist Resource Network, is a group of churches affiliated with the Southern Baptist Convention located in the U.S. states of Pennsylvania and New Jersey.

The convention is based in Harrisburg, Pennsylvania. It is made up of around 315 churches as of 2025.

The convention was set up in 1963 and officially constituted in 1970.

Since 2008, the convention has used the name Baptist Resource Network.

Since 2017, Dr. Barry Whitworth has served as executive director of the Baptist Resource Network.
