= Baptist Convention of New York =

Baptist church group

The Baptist Convention of New York is a group of churches affiliated with the Southern Baptist Convention located in the U.S. state of New York, Northern New Jersey, and Connecticut.

The convention is headquartered in East Syracuse, New York. It is made up of 10 Baptist associations as of 2020.

== Affiliated organization ==
- BCNY Foundation - assist with the financial needs of the convention
