= John Adelbert Davis =

John Davis
- Born: John Adelbert Davis; August 7, 1871; Afton, New York, United States
- Died: March 17, 1934 (aged 62)
- Occupation: Educator
- Known for: Founder of the Practical Bible Training School in Johnson City, New York in 1900
- Spouse: Etta Carr (m. 1894–1934)
- Children: 2

John Adelbert Davis (August 7, 1871 – March 17, 1934) was the founder of the Practical Bible Training School (PBTS) in Johnson City, New York, in 1900. In 2004, Practical Bible was renamed Davis College in his honor.

== Early life ==
On Melandy Hill in Afton, New York, Davis was born to Union Civil War veteran Charles Davis and his wife, Hulda Davis. Davis was the older of two sons. After a few years in Afton and North Sanford, New York, Davis moved to Binghamton, New York.

=== Religious revelation ===
During his time in Binghamton, New York, Davis became a very devout Christian. In 1893, he went to the Chicago Bible Institute (now the Moody Bible Institute) where he served Mr. Moody's table. Heading back to New York after his time in Chicago, Davis stopped in Kalamazoo, Michigan, where a small set of evangelical meetings turned into a large revival meetings throughout the city.

== Career ==
=== Revival meetings ===
Davis conducted meetings in the following years of his life all over the east coast of the United States including: Binghamton, Baltimore, Maryland, Brooklyn, and New York. He also went to England.

=== Bible school ===
In the spring of 1900, Davis wanted to start a Bible school to train young men and women to become pastors, missionaries, pastor's wives, and many other parts of the Christian ministry. In the summer of 1900, the classes of the Practical Bible Training School began in Lestershire (now Johnson City), New York. Davis became one of the teachers and the Superintendent of the school. Davis chose a long-time friend John R. Clements to be the first president of the college. The school moved to Harrison Street soon after the first classes and in 1911 the school moved to its present location on Riverside Drive in the village of Johnson City, New York.

In 1914, the Practical Bible Training School was prospering and Davis became the President of the School. In 1924, Davis made plans and raised funds for a "Bible School Lake" winter retreat project in Florida.

== Personal life ==
Davis married Etta Carr in 1894. They had two sons, Gordon and Charles. Their son Charles died in 1931. The next year in 1932, several faculty and staff left to form Baptist Bible Seminary (now in Clarks Summit, Pennsylvania). On Saturday, March 17, 1934, after a stroke and several other health problems, Davis died in his bed. Over 4,000 people attended his funeral on the knoll behind the school. His son Gordon Davis became president of the PBTS, and his wife, a graduate of the school, was Dean of Women.
