= Colesville, New York =

- Town
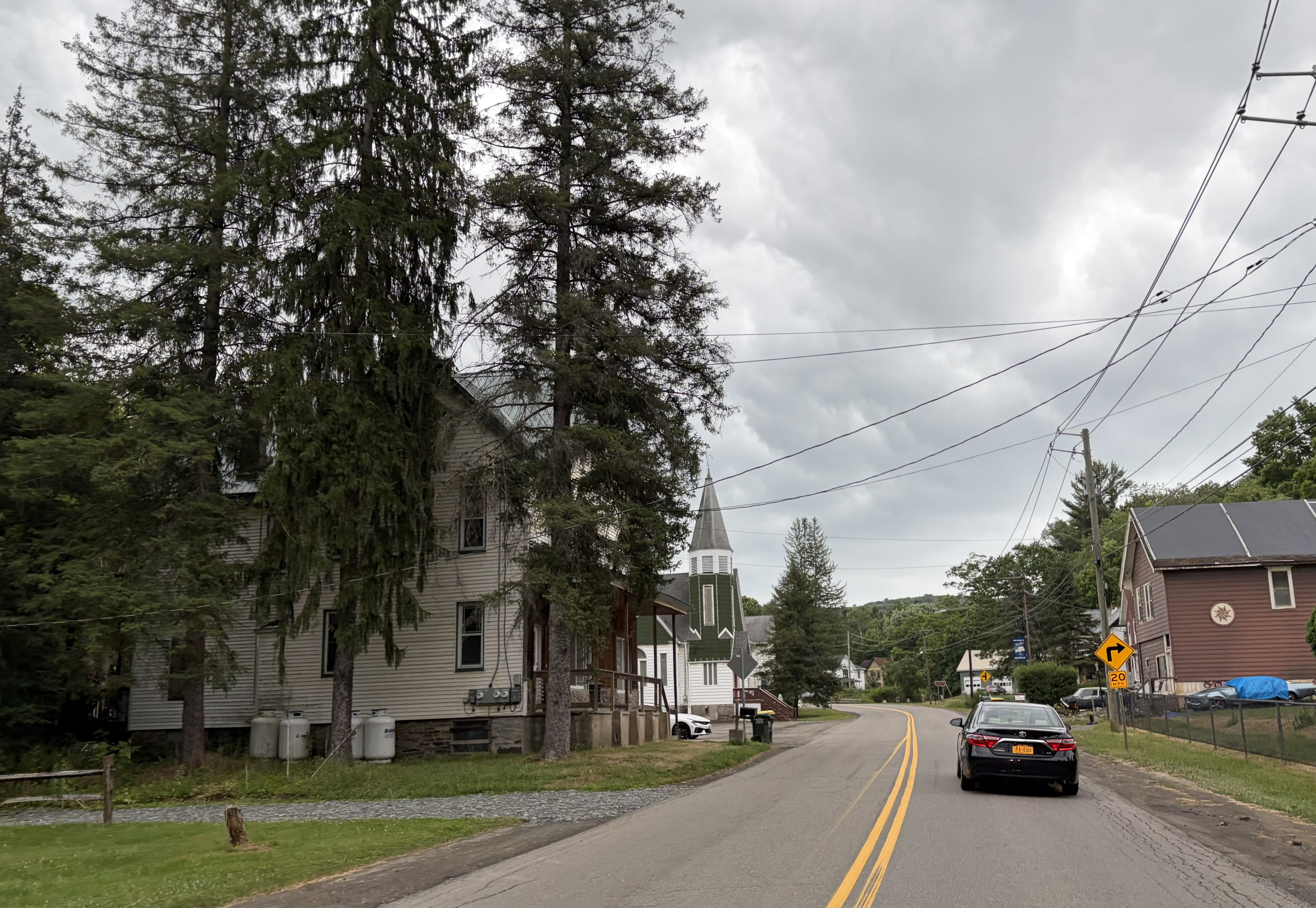
- The hamlet of Sanitaria Springs in the western end of Colesville

- Seal

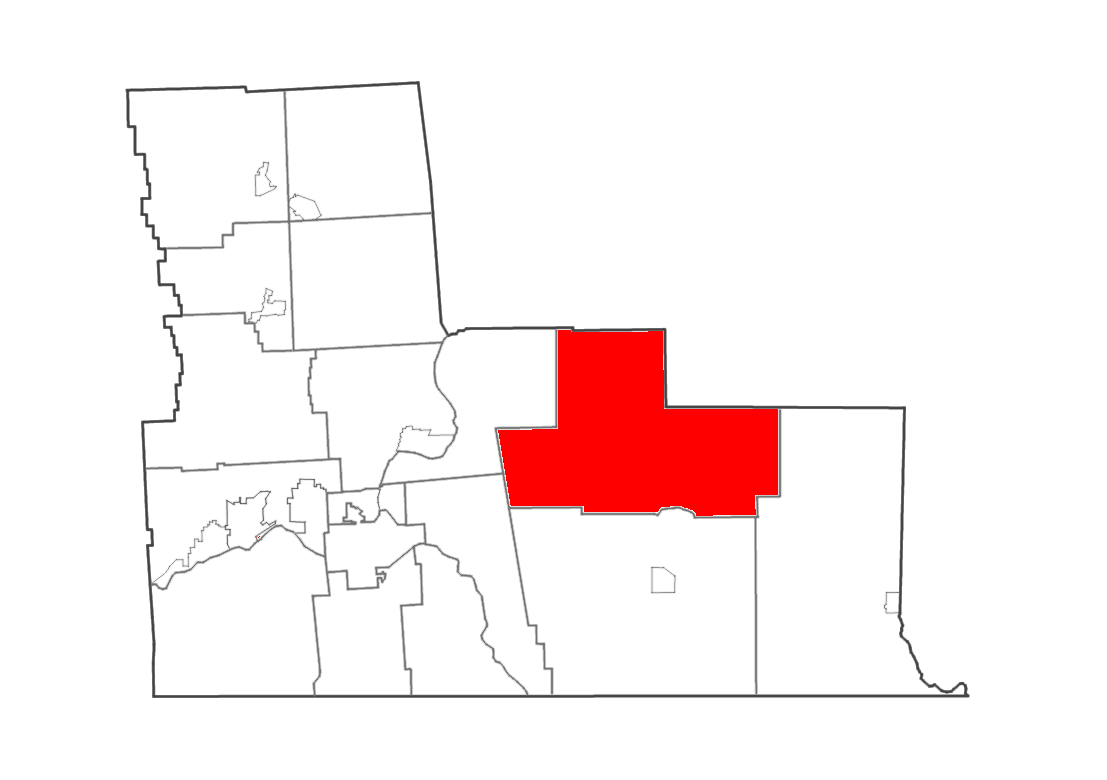
- Location within Broome County

- Location within New York Location within the United States
- Coordinates: 42°10′14″N 75°39′57″W
- Country: United States
- State: New York
- County: Broome
- Organized: 1821

Government
  - Type: Town Council
  - Town Supervisor: Glenn S. Winsor
  - Town Council: Members' List: • Margaret Wicks; • Doug Rhodes; • Jim Hawkins; • Michael Olin

Area
  - Total: 79.17 sq mi (205.05 km^{2})
  - Land: 78.36 sq mi (202.94 km^{2})
  - Water: 0.81 sq mi (2.11 km^{2})
- Elevation: 1,348 ft (411 m)

Population (2020)
  - Total: 4,877 ▼
  - Estimate (2021): 4,832
  - Density: 65.0/sq mi (25.09/km^{2})
- Time zone: UTC-5 (Eastern (EST))
  - Summer (DST): UTC-4 (EDT)
- ZIP Codes: 13787 (Harpursville); 13813 (Nineveh); 13833 (Port Crane); 13848 (Tunnel); 13865 (Windsor); 13904 (Binghamton)
- Area code: 607
- FIPS code: 36-17046
- GNIS feature ID: 978851
- Website: townofcolesville.org

Colesville is a town in Broome County, New York, United States. The population was 4,877 at the 2020 census.

The town is in the northeastern part of the county and is northeast of Binghamton.

== History ==
The area was first settled circa 1785. Nathaniel Cole, father of Anthony Cole, settled at Cole’s Hill in 1795, and the town of Colesville was named after him. The town was established in 1821 from part of the town of Windsor.

Robert Harpur, an early developer, has lent his name to the community of Harpursville. Harpur is believed to be responsible for the many classical names assigned to communities in central New York.

== Geography ==
According to the United States Census Bureau, the town of Colesville has a total area of 79.2 square miles (205.1 km^{2}), of which 78.3 square miles (202.9 km^{2}) is land and 0.81 square miles (2.1 km^{2}), or 1.04%, is water.

The northern town line is the border of Chenango County. The Susquehanna River flows southward through the town.

Interstate 88 passes across the town. New York State Route 7 and New York State Route 79 are important highways in Colesville. New York State Route 235 connects with state route 7 north of Harpursville to State Route 206 in the town of Coventry, Chenango County.

== Demographics ==
Historical population
Census	Pop.	Note	%±
1830	2,389		—
1840	2,528		5.8%
1850	3,061		21.1%
1860	3,250		6.2%
1870	2,460		−24.3%
1880	3,208		30.4%
1890	3,126		−2.6%
1900	2,773		−11.3%
1910	2,415		−12.9%
1920	2,311		−4.3%
1930	2,394		3.6%
1940	2,652		10.8%
1950	3,084		16.3%
1960	3,773		22.3%
1970	4,420		17.1%
1980	4,965		12.3%
1990	5,590		12.6%
2000	5,441		−2.7%
2010	5,232		−3.8%
2020	4,877		−6.8%
2021 (est.)	4,832		−0.9%
U.S. Decennial Census

As of the census of 2000, there were 5,441 people, 1,944 households, and 1,458 families residing in the town. The population density was 69.3 inhabitants per square mile (26.8/km^{2}). There were 2,189 housing units at an average density of 27.9 per square mile (10.8/km^{2}). The racial makeup of the town was 97.85% White, 0.29% African American, 0.31% Native American, 0.35% Asian, 0.06% Pacific Islander, 0.02% from other races, and 1.12% from two or more races. Hispanic or Latino of any race were 0.74% of the population.

There were 1,944 households, out of which 36.3% had children under the age of 18 living with them, 58.4% were married couples living together, 10.8% had a female householder with no husband present, and 25.0% were non-families. 19.2% of all households were made up of individuals, and 6.8% had someone living alone who was 65 years of age or older. The average household size was 2.79 and the average family size was 3.11.

In the town, the population was spread out, with 29.4% under the age of 18, 6.5% from 18 to 24, 28.7% from 25 to 44, 23.9% from 45 to 64, and 11.4% who were 65 years of age or older. The median age was 37 years. For every 100 females, there were 100.0 males. For every 100 females age 18 and over, there were 98.6 males.

The median income for a household in the town was $38,444, and the median income for a family was $40,333. Males had a median income of $31,462 versus $22,917 for females. The per capita income for the town was $15,816. About 6.7% of families and 10.3% of the population were below the poverty line, including 11.8% of those under age 18 and 9.5% of those age 65 or over.

== Government ==
The current town supervisor is Republican Glenn S. Winsor. Winsor, facing no significant opposition, received 99.37% of the vote in the 2024 election. The current Town Clerk is republican Tomi Stewart. There are only 2 town council members, Gary J. Cower and Natalie Collins who are both Republicans. Gary J. Cower was the only member of the Colesville government to face any opposition, winning with just 50.46% of the vote with only 45 more votes than his opponent.

== Communities and locations in Colesville ==
- Belden – A hamlet northwest of Harpursville on NY Route 7.

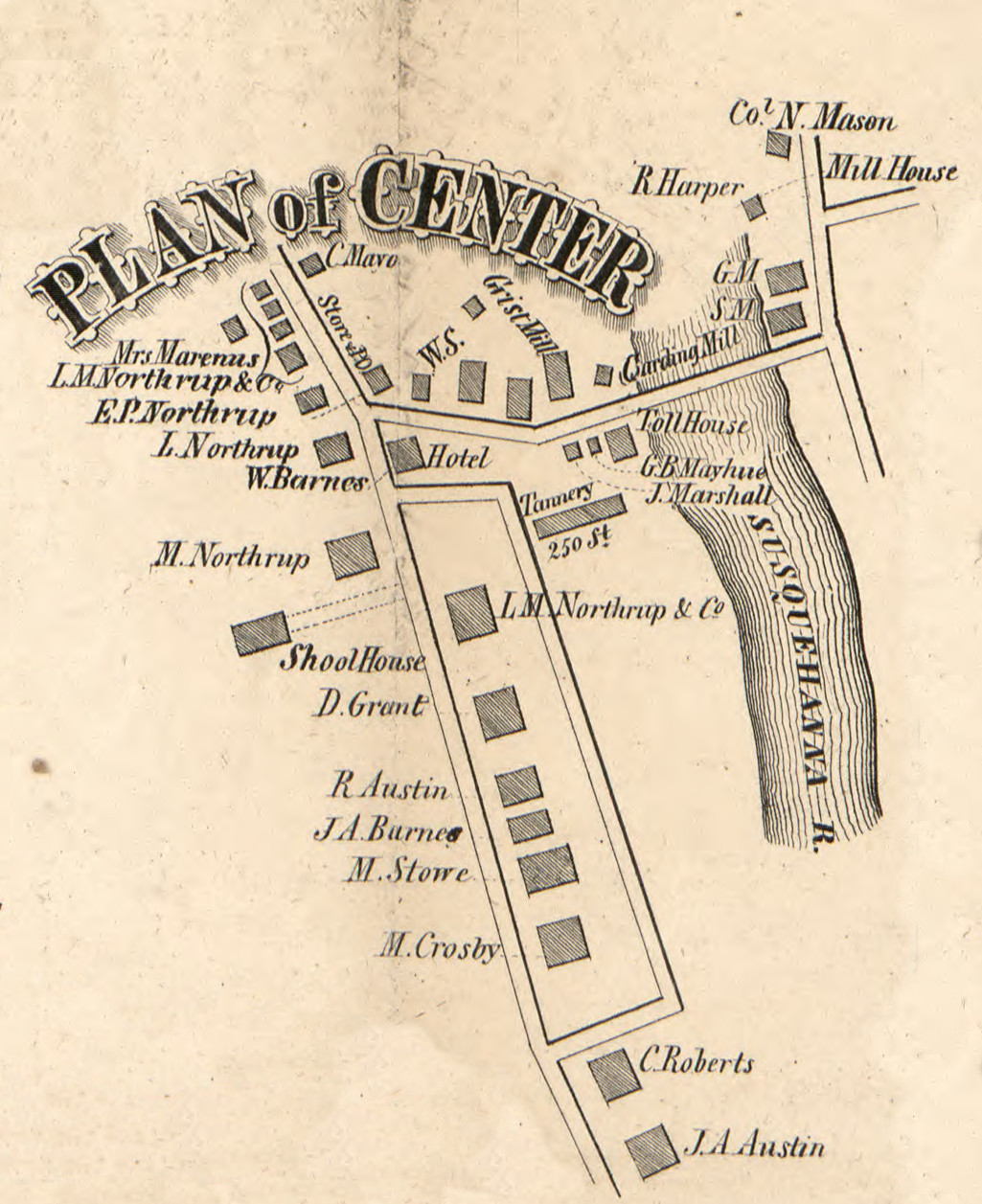
Center Village (1855)

- Center Village - A hamlet south of Harpursville on NY Route 79.
- Doraville – A hamlet in the eastern part of the town.

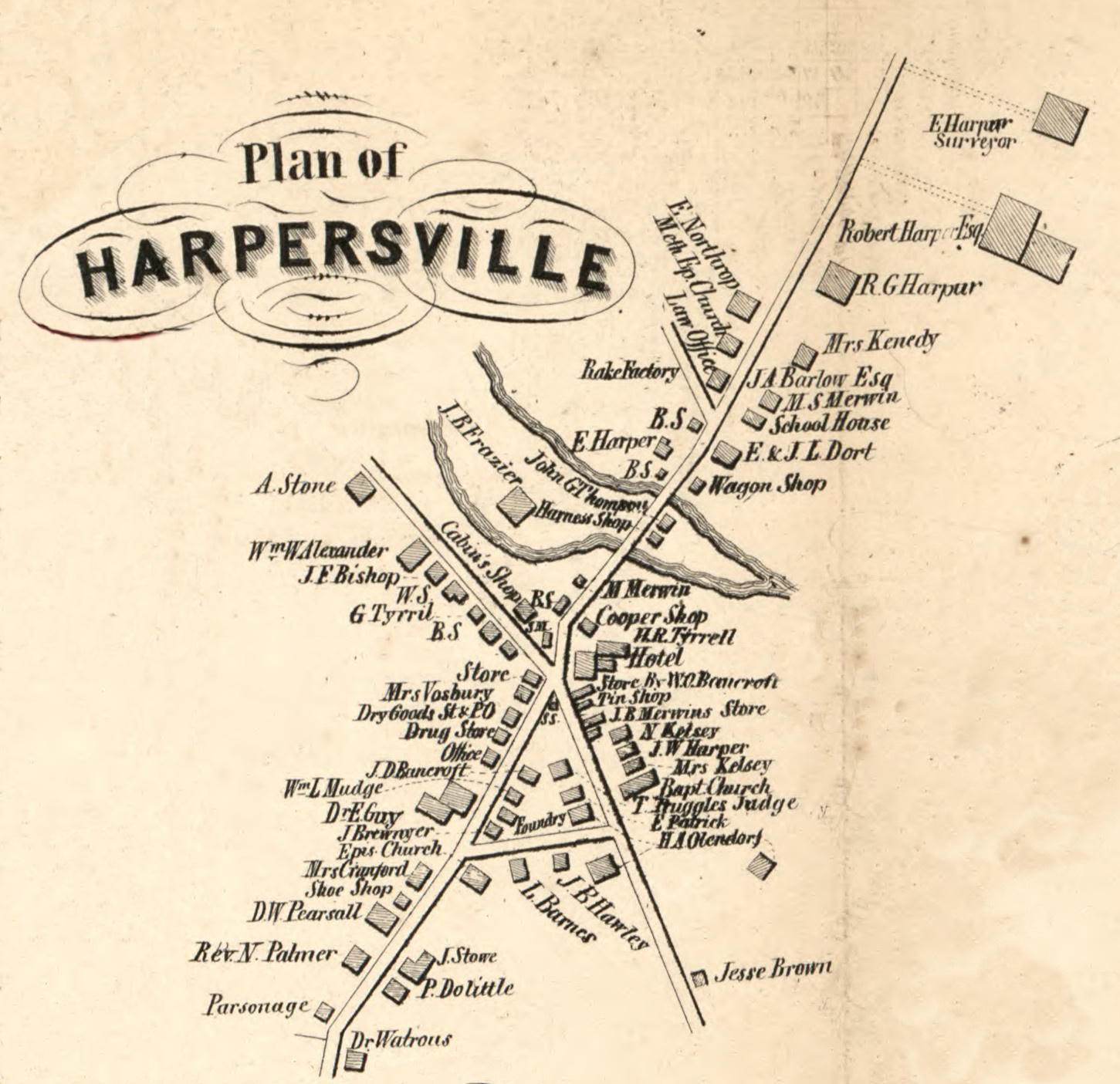
Harpersville (1855)

- Harpursville – The principal community in the town, located on NY-79, with access from Interstate 88 exit 6. The Harpursville United Methodist Church was listed on the National Register of Historic Places in 2006.
- Nathaniel Cole Park Pond – A lake located by West Colesville.
- New Ohio – A hamlet in the northwestern part of the town.
- Nineveh – A hamlet northeast of Harpursville and on the northern town line.
- North Colesville – A hamlet in the northwestern part of the town on NY-79.
- Ouaquaga – A hamlet in the southern part of the town.
- Sanitaria Springs – A hamlet at the western town line, northwest of West Colesville on County Route 217; served by exit 4 of Interstate 88. It was formerly called "Osborne Hollow."
- Tunnel – A location south of New Ohio.
- West Colesville – A hamlet on the southern town line.
