= Johnson City High School (New York) =

Location
- 666 Reynolds Rd; Johnson City, Broome County, New York 13790-1398; United States; 42.1349°N 75.9690°W

Information
- Type: public
- School district: Johnson City Central School District
- NCES School ID: 361590001375
- Principal: Fred Deinhardt
- Staff: 55.87 (FTE)
- Grades: 9 - 12
- Enrollment: 711 (2023-2024)
- Student to teacher ratio: 12.73
- Campus: suburban
- Colors: Maroon and White
- Mascot: Wildcat
- State School ID: NY-031502060000-031502060006
- Website: hs.jcschools.com

- Johnson City High School
- Location: 435 Main Street, Johnson City, New York
- NRHP reference No.: SG100012401
- Added to NRHP: November 13, 2025

Johnson City High School is a public high school located in Johnson City, New York, a village in Broome County adjacent to Binghamton. It is operated by Johnson City Central School District. The school, originally situated on Main Street in downtown Johnson City, was relocated to where it currently stands on Reynolds Road.

The Main Street building was listed on the National Register of Historic Places in 2025.

== Academics ==
The Johnson City Guidance Office asserts that the "Johnson City Senior High School provides a comprehensive program in curricular, co-curricular and extracurricular activities designed to permit the development of programs that enable pupils to identify their talents, skills, strengths, and special interests." As of 2025, 13 AP courses are offered as well as a number of dual-credit and honors courses.

== Athletics ==
After facing flooding in 2006 and again in 2011, the Johnson City High School football field located at Greensfield (a.k.a. Northside Park) was left in a dilapidated state, as the eight feet of standing water heavily ruined the bleachers, scoreboard, concession stand, restrooms, and team rooms. The varsity football team played their home games at Binghamton High School's Alumni Stadium from 2011 to 2013. The school district was allocated disaster relief funds courtesy of FEMA, and after a district wide budget election a new stadium on campus was approved and constructed. The grand opening of the new 'Wildcat Stadium' was held in 2014 which was ultimately fitted with bleachers, restrooms, a concession stand, and team rooms.

== Notable alumni ==
- Howard G. Garrison, US Army major general
- Matthew S. Klimow, former US Ambassador to Turkmenistan
