= Nineveh, New York =

Hamlet in New York, United States

Coordinates: 42°11′39″N 75°36′09″W

Location of Nineveh, New York

Nineveh is a hamlet with approximately fifty homes on the banks of the Susquehanna River in Broome County, New York, United States. It is part of the Town of Colesville, within the Binghamton metropolitan area in eastern Broome County. Nineveh is located on the USGS Afton quadrangle at an elevation of about 960 feet. Nineveh takes its name from ancient Nineveh, the most important city on the Tigris River in the ancient kingdom of Assyria (now Iraq).

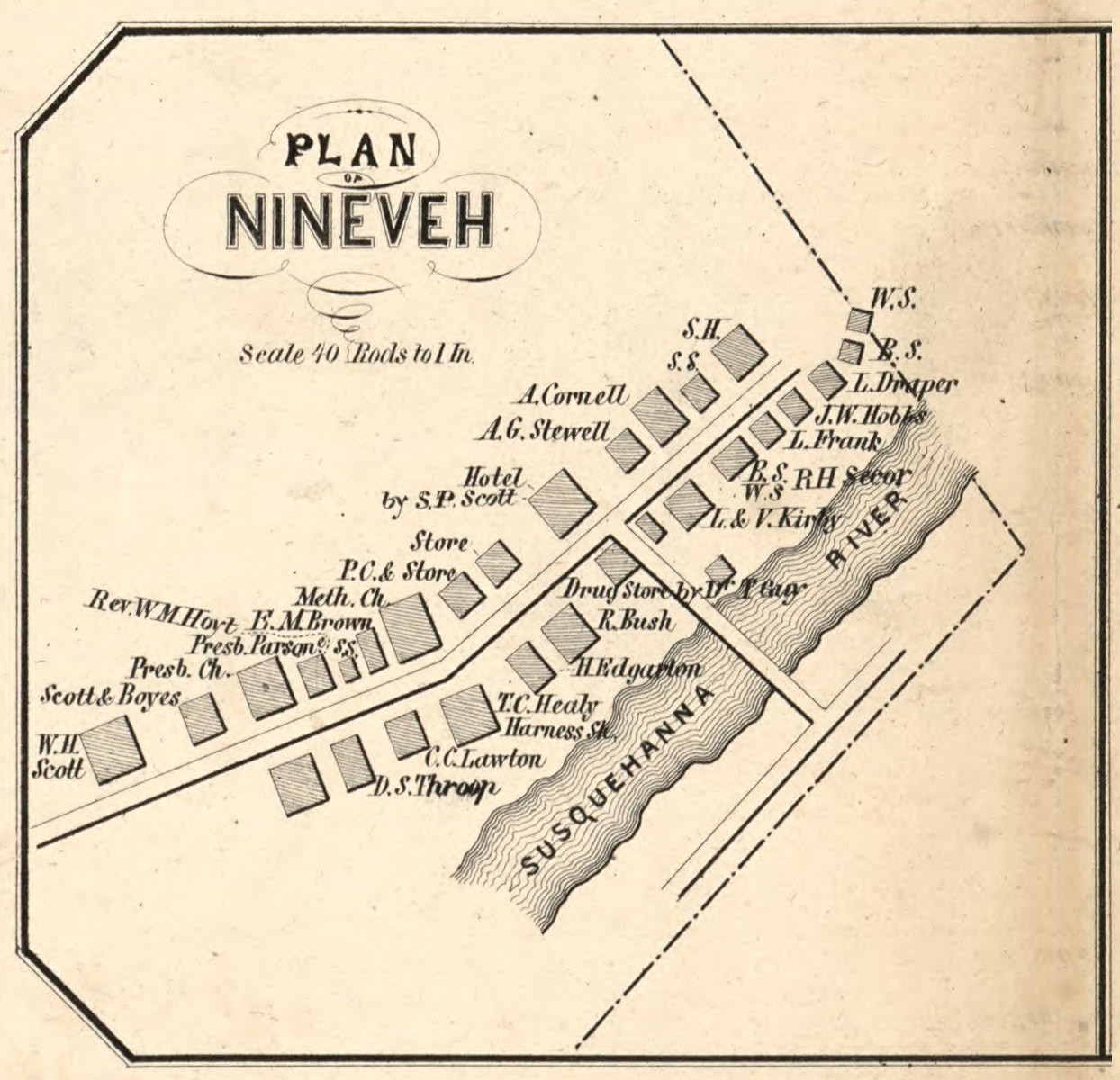
Plan for Nineveh (1855)

Nineveh is located along the tracks of the Delaware and Hudson Railway and has a distinct trestle located there.

New York State Route 7 is the main road through the hamlet, with several small businesses serving the residents' basic needs located along it.

In June 2006, widespread flooding along the river basin inundated many homes along the banks of the river.

== Notable people ==
- Charles S. Butler (1870–1946), physician and member of the New York State Assembly
- Emma Augusta Fox (1847–1945), author and teacher of parliamentary practice for women's organizations
- Johnny Hart (1931–2007), illustrator and writer (B.C. comics and The Wizard of Id)
