= Johnson City, New York =

- Village
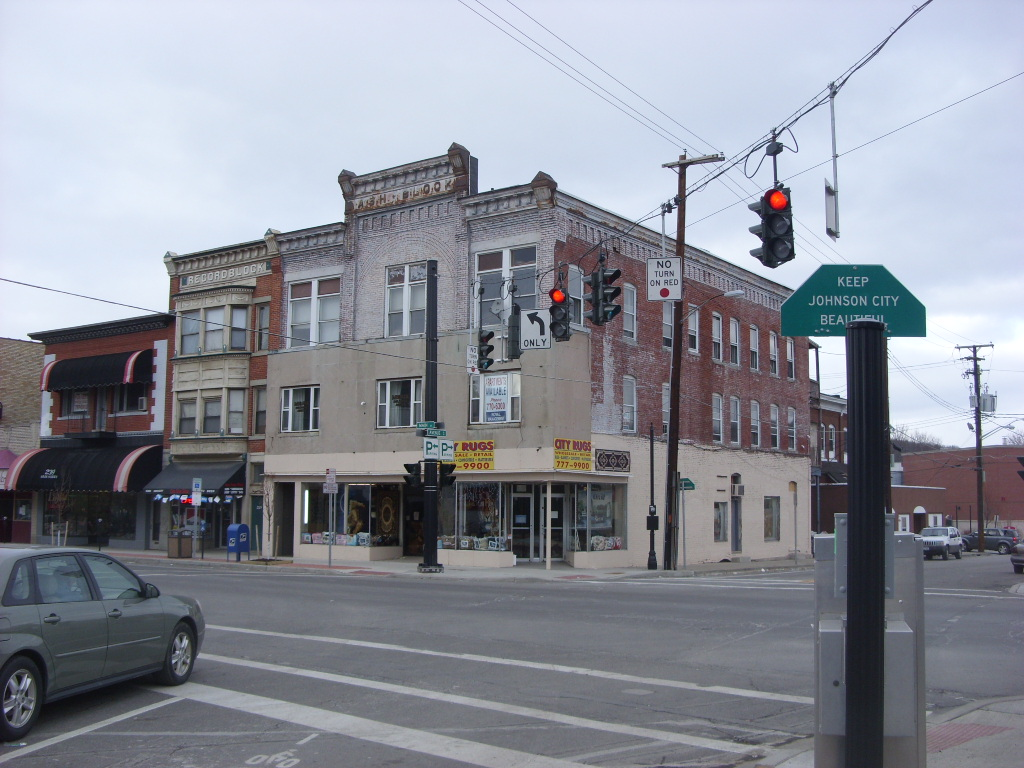
- Johnson City

- Flag
- Motto: "Home of the Square Deal"
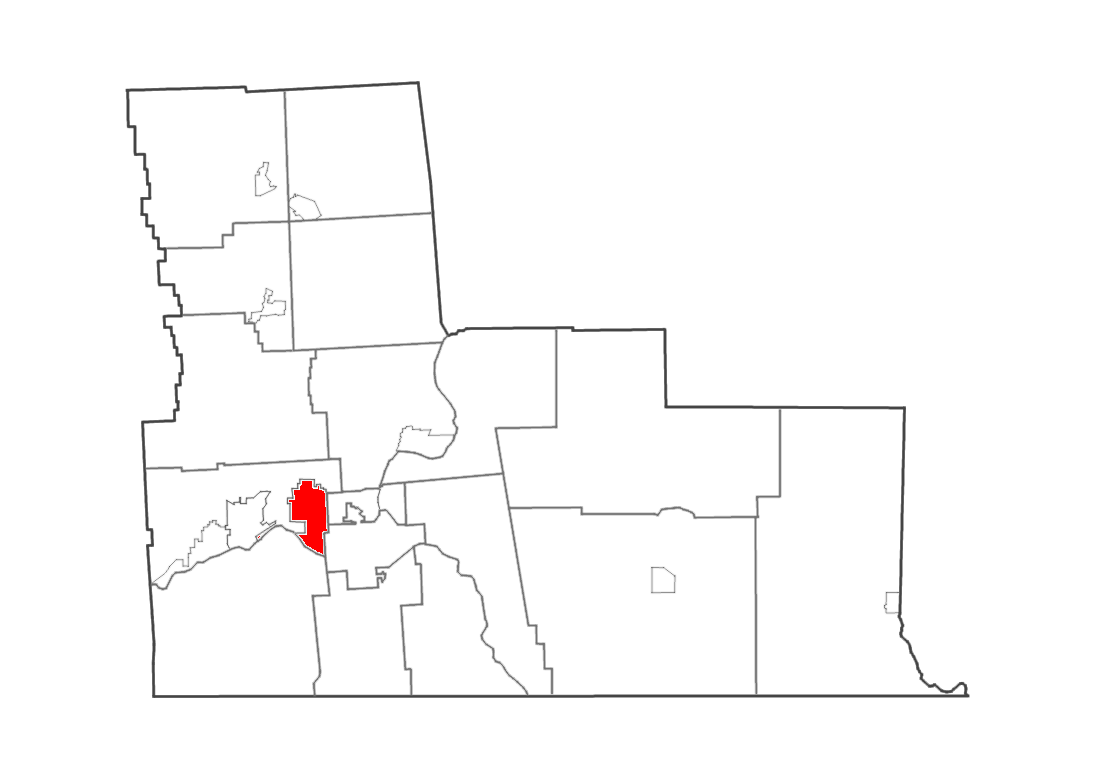
- Map highlighting Johnson City's location within Broome County.

- Location within the state of New York
- Coordinates: 42°7′0″N 75°57′34″W
- Country: United States
- State: New York
- County: Broome
- Town: Union
- Incorporated: 1892; 134 years ago (village of Lestershire)
- Renamed: 1916; 110 years ago

Government
  - Mayor: Christina Charuk

Area
  - Total: 4.67 sq mi (12.09 km^{2})
  - Land: 4.55 sq mi (11.79 km^{2})
  - Water: 0.12 sq mi (0.30 km^{2})
- Elevation: 873 ft (266 m)

Population (2020)
  - Total: 15,343
  - Density: 3,370.6/sq mi (1,301.41/km^{2})
- Time zone: UTC-5 (Eastern (EST))
  - Summer (DST): UTC-4 (EDT)
- ZIP code: 13790
- Area code: 607
- FIPS code: 36-38748
- GNIS feature ID: 954109
- Website: www.villageofjc.com

Johnson City is a village in Broome County, New York, United States. The population was 15,343 at the 2020 census. It is part of the Binghamton Metropolitan Statistical Area.

The village of Johnson City is in the town of Union and is a part of the "Triple Cities" along with Endicott and Binghamton. Johnson City lies to the west of Binghamton on the eastern side of the town of Union.

== History ==
Known as the "Home of the Square Deal", from the Square Deal given to all employees of Endicott Johnson Corporation, Johnson City was originally incorporated in 1892 as the village of Lestershire. In 1916, the village was renamed Johnson City in honor of George F. Johnson, who led the company that was by then known as Endicott Johnson. Much of Johnson City's history is rooted in the prosperity of the Endicott Johnson Corporation, and later in the prosperity brought by IBM in neighboring Endicott. However, the deindustrialization that occurred across the United States impacted Johnson City heavily. The loss of nearly all industry in the span of a couple decades left the economy of Upstate New York, and thus Johnson City, devastated and in recession, explaining in part the village's population decline over time. Over the past decade, new revitalization efforts led by the expansion of United Health Services and Binghamton University have rejuvenated the area tremendously.

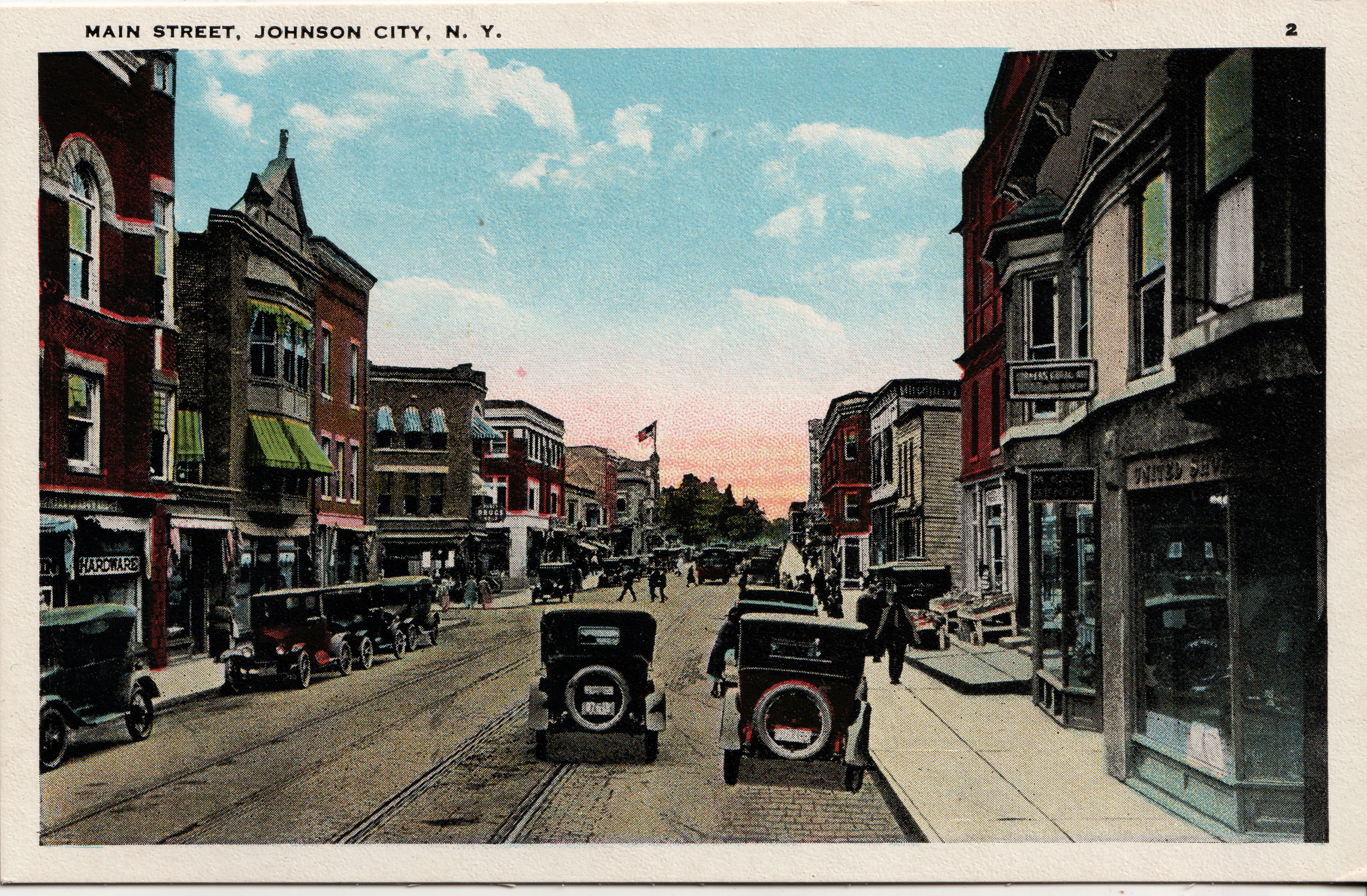
Main Street in Johnson City during the early 20th century

In January 2007, a group of residents organized a petition supporting dissolution of the village for tax reasons. The issue was unsuccessfully floated at a November 3, 2009 election; the returns released on November 12, 2009 decided rejection by 42 votes.

== Geography ==
According to the United States Census Bureau, the village has a total area of 4.6 square miles (12.0 km^{2}), of which 4.5 square miles (11.7 km^{2}) is land and 0.12 square miles (0.3 km^{2}), or 2.13%, is water.

Johnson City is on the north side of the Susquehanna River.

The junction of New York State Route 17 and New York State Route 201, which connects the community to the south side of the Susquehanna River, is in Johnson City. New York State Route 17C parallels NY-17.

Nearby Johnson City are multiple interstates, including: Interstate 81, Interstate 86 (Pennsylvania–New York), and Interstate 88 (New York).

== Demographics ==
Historical population
Census	Pop.	Note	%±
1900	3,111		—
1910	3,775		21.3%
1920	8,587		127.5%
1930	13,567		58.0%
1940	18,039		33.0%
1950	19,249		6.7%
1960	19,118		−0.7%
1970	18,025		−5.7%
1980	17,126		−5.0%
1990	16,890		−1.4%
2000	15,535		−8.0%
2010	15,174		−2.3%
2020	15,343		1.1%
U.S. Decennial Census

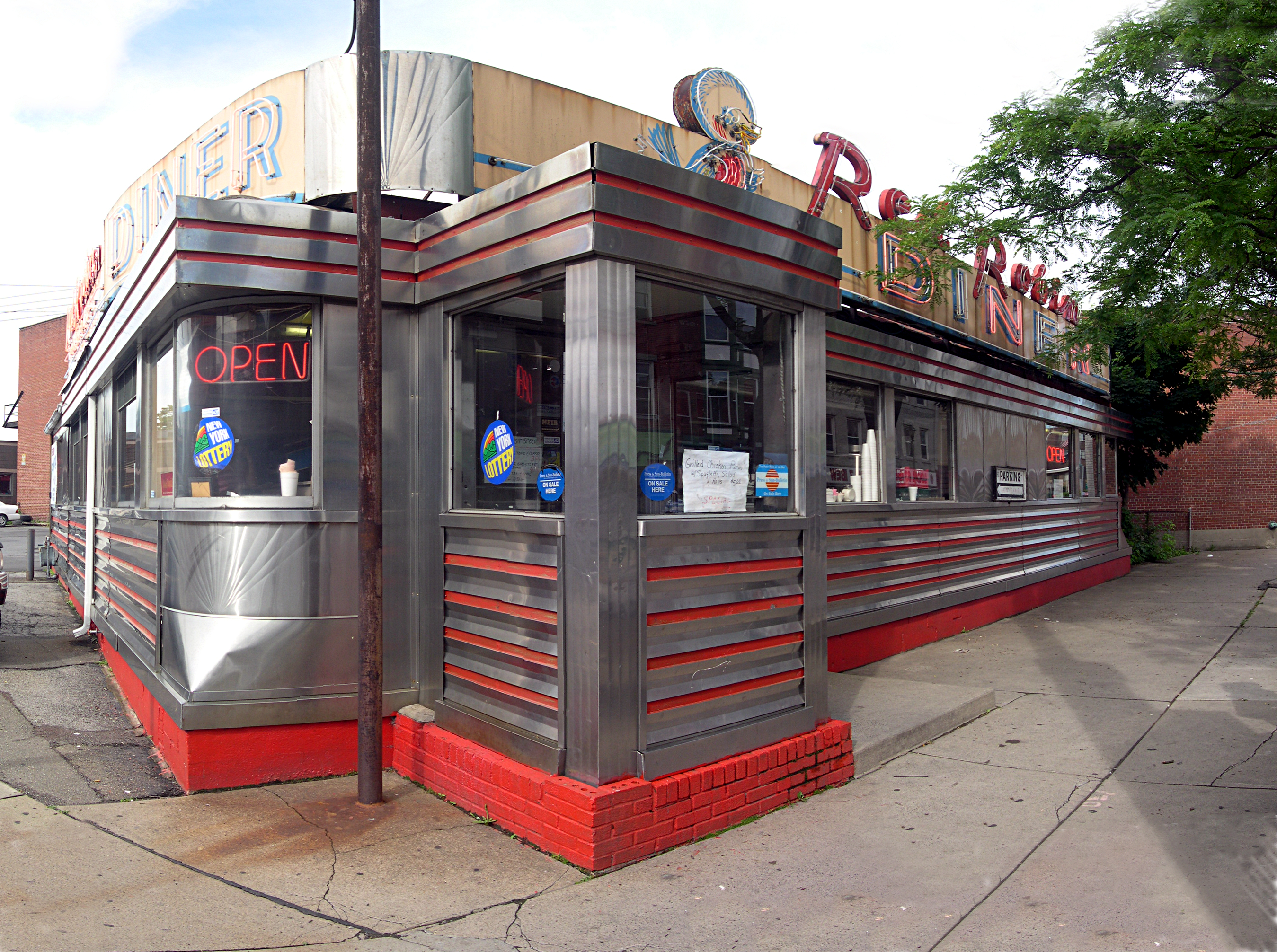
The former Red Robin Diner in downtown Johnson City

=== 2020 census ===
As of the 2020 census, Johnson City had a population of 15,343, with 6,699 households and 3,651 families.

The median age was 41.5 years. 18.8% of residents were under the age of 18 and 23.0% were 65 years of age or older. For every 100 females there were 88.1 males, and for every 100 females age 18 and over there were 85.3 males age 18 and over.

100.0% of residents lived in urban areas, while 0.0% lived in rural areas.

There were 7,726 housing units, of which 13.3% were vacant. The homeowner vacancy rate was 2.6% and the rental vacancy rate was 7.2%.

Of the 6,699 households, 23.0% had children under the age of 18 living in them. Of all households, 30.7% were married-couple households, 23.9% were households with a male householder and no spouse or partner present, and 36.3% were households with a female householder and no spouse or partner present. About 39.6% of all households were made up of individuals, and 16.0% had someone living alone who was 65 years of age or older.

Racial composition as of the 2020 census
Race	Number	Percent
White	11,388	74.2%
Black or African American	1,280	8.3%
American Indian and Alaska Native	36	0.2%
Asian	1,131	7.4%
Native Hawaiian and Other Pacific Islander	13	0.1%
Some other race	335	2.2%
Two or more races	1,160	7.6%
Hispanic or Latino (of any race)	930	6.1%

=== Demographic estimates ===
The population density was 3,370.6 inhabitants per square mile (1,301.4/km^{2}). There were 7,650 housing units at an average density of 1,722.1 units per square mile (664.9 units/km^{2}).

The average household size was 2.12 and the average family size was 2.88.

=== Income and poverty ===
The annual per capita income for a household in the village was $27,643, and the median income for a family was $39,241. Males had a median income of $31,980 versus $24,656 for females. Roughly 19.6% of the total population fell below the poverty line.

As of the 2020 census, there were a total of 923 veterans residing in Johnson City.

== Notable sites ==
=== Library ===
Your Home Library, founded in 1917, serves the village of Johnson City and the surrounding area. The library building was originally the old Brigham homestead, erected in 1850, and listed on the National Register of Historic Places in 2005.

== Education ==
The K-8 Elementary, Intermediate, and Middle School is located just above the high school on 601 Columbia Drive; and the Johnson City High School is located on 666 Reynolds Road. The schools are operated by Johnson City Central School District.

=== Colleges ===
Davis College was a private Baptist bible college in Johnson City. It was founded in 1900 under the leadership of John Adelbert Davis. The first location was on Harrison Street where Wilson Hospital now stands. The present site was bought in 1910 and the college moved to Riverside Drive in 1911. As of October 1911, that location also became known as the post office of Bible School Park, New York. The college had about 329 students. In September 2023, the property was sold to Birchwood Management Group.

Baptist Bible College & Seminary was based at First Baptist Church in Johnson City from 1932 until it relocated to Clarks Summit, Pennsylvania in 1968.

The Binghamton University Decker health sciences campus is located on Corliss Ave, in the blocks bounded by Arch St, Broad St, and Willow St.

Johnson City is also located across the Susquehanna River from Binghamton University's main campus, which is in Vestal, New York.

== Notable people ==
- Danijal Brković, soccer player
- Fred Coury, drummer for 80s hair-metal band Cinderella
- Jerry D'Amigo, professional ice hockey player, graduated from Johnson City High School in 2009.
- Howard G. Garrison, US Army major general
- George F. Johnson, founded the Endicott Johnson Corporation here.
- Jim Johnson, professional baseball player, was born here.
- DaQuan Jones, professional NFL player for the Buffalo Bills, graduated from Johnson City High School in 2010.
- David Sedaris, American humorist, comedian, author, and radio contributor.
- Jiverly Antares Wong, mass murderer.
