= National Register of Historic Places listings in Tioga County, New York =

Location of Tioga County in New York

List of the National Register of Historic Places listings in Tioga County, New York

This is intended to be a complete list of properties and districts listed on the National Register of Historic Places in Tioga County, New York. The locations of National Register properties and districts (at least for all showing latitude and longitude coordinates below) may be seen in a map by clicking on "Map of all coordinates".

This National Park Service list is complete through NPS recent listings posted May 1, 2026.

Contents: Counties in New York
Albany (Albany) – Allegany – Bronx – Broome – Cattaraugus – Cayuga – Chautauqua – Chemung – Chenango – Clinton – Columbia – Cortland – Delaware – Dutchess (Poughkeepsie, Rhinebeck) – Erie (Buffalo) – Essex – Franklin – Fulton – Genesee – Greene – Hamilton – Herkimer – Jefferson – Kings – Lewis – Livingston – Madison – Monroe (Rochester) – Montgomery – Nassau – New York (Below 14th Street, 14th to 59th Streets, 59th to 110th Streets, Above 110th Street, Islands) – Niagara (Niagara Falls) – Oneida – Onondaga (Syracuse) – Ontario – Orange – Orleans – Oswego – Otsego – Putnam – Queens – Rensselaer – Richmond – Rockland – St. Lawrence – Saratoga – Schenectady – Schoharie – Schuyler – Seneca – Steuben – Suffolk – Sullivan – Tioga – Tompkins – Ulster – Warren – Washington – Wayne – Westchester (Northern, Southern, New Rochelle, Peekskill, Yonkers) – Wyoming – Yates

== Listings county-wide ==
	Name on the Register	Image	Date listed	Location	City or town	Description
1	Lyman P. Akins House	Lyman P. Akins House	July 2, 1984 (#84003067)	W. Creek Rd. 42°18′53″N 76°14′56″W	Berkshire	
2	Robert Akins House		July 2, 1984 (#84003069)	Main St. 42°18′07″N 76°11′17″W	Berkshire	
3	J. Ball House	J. Ball House	July 2, 1984 (#84003072)	NY 38; 42°17′53″N 76°11′10″W	Berkshire	
4	Levi Ball House	Levi Ball House	July 2, 1984 (#84003075)	NY 38; 42°19′31″N 76°10′56″W	Berkshire	
5	Stephen Ball House	Stephen Ball House	July 2, 1984 (#84003077)	Main St. 42°18′04″N 76°11′15″W	Berkshire	
6	James C. Beecher House	James C. Beecher House	July 27, 2012 (#12000482)	560 5th Ave. 42°06′16″N 76°14′46″W	Owego	
7	Belcher Family Homestead and Farm	Belcher Family Homestead and Farm	July 2, 1984 (#84003082)	NY 38; 42°17′02″N 76°11′18″W	Berkshire	
8	Belcher-Holden Farm	Belcher-Holden Farm	December 15, 1997 (#97001486)	5825 NY 38; 42°11′28″N 76°12′17″W	Newark Valley	
9	Bement-Billings House	Bement-Billings House	February 19, 1990 (#90000002)	NY 38, N of Newark Valley; 42°14′10″N 76°10′45″W	Newark Valley	
10	Berkshire Village Historic District	Berkshire Village Historic District	July 2, 1984 (#84003086)	Main St. and Leonard Ave. 42°18′22″N 76°11′14″W	Berkshire	
11	Blewer Farm	Blewer Farm	March 16, 1998 (#98000166)	184 and 226 Blewer-Mead Rd. 42°11′50″N 76°13′50″W	Newark Valley	
12	Calvin A. Buffington House	Calvin A. Buffington House	July 2, 1984 (#84003089)	Depot St. and Railroad Ave. 42°18′15″N 76°11′05″W	Berkshire	
13	Daniel Chamberlain House	Daniel Chamberlain House	December 15, 1997 (#97001489)	627 Brown Rd. 42°16′22″N 76°10′28″W	Newark Valley	
14	Morris Clinton House	Morris Clinton House	March 16, 1998 (#98000162)	225 Zimmer Rd. 42°12′41″N 76°10′49″W	Newark Valley	
15	Nathaniel Bishop Collins House	Nathaniel Bishop Collins House	July 2, 1984 (#84003096)	NY 38; 42°18′40″N 76°11′04″W	Berkshire	
16	East Berkshire United Methodist Church	East Berkshire United Methodist Church	July 2, 1984 (#84003098)	E. Berkshire Rd. 42°18′24″N 76°08′42″W	Berkshire	
17	Evergreen Cemetery	Evergreen Cemetery	April 1, 2002 (#02000305)	East Ave., bet. Erie St. and Prospect St. 42°06′26″N 76°15′55″W	Owego	
18	Farrand-Pierson House	Farrand-Pierson House	December 15, 1997 (#97001490)	441 Brown Rd. 42°16′10″N 76°10′27″W	Newark Valley	
19	First Congregational Church	First Congregational Church	July 2, 1984 (#84003101)	Main St. 42°18′06″N 76°11′18″W	Berkshire	
20	First Methodist Episcopal Church of Tioga Center	First Methodist Episcopal Church of Tioga Center	April 1, 2002 (#02000304)	NY 17C; 42°05′02″N 76°20′53″W	Tioga Center	
21	First Presbyterian Church	First Presbyterian Church	December 7, 2005 (#05001392)	75-77 N. Main St. 42°12′50″N 76°29′33″W	Spencer	
22	Lebbeus Ford House	Lebbeus Ford House	July 2, 1984 (#84003104)	Jewett Hill Rd. 42°18′40″N 76°11′37″W	Berkshire	
23	Glenwood Cemetery and Mausoleum		March 8, 2016 (#16000064)	113 Moore St. 42°00′29″N 76°33′03″W	Waverly	Large 1895 hillside cemetery with 1923 marble mausoleum
24	Grace Episcopal Church		August 2, 2000 (#00000878)	445 Park Ave. 42°00′13″N 76°32′22″W	Waverly	
25	Halsey Valley Grand Army of the Republic Meeting Hall	Halsey Valley Grand Army of the Republic Meeting Hall	January 23, 2003 (#02001646)	Hamilton Valley Rd. 42°08′27″N 76°26′28″W	Spencer	
26	Hiawatha Farm	Hiawatha Farm	May 20, 1998 (#98000551)	2293 NY 17C; 42°05′30″N 76°12′46″W	Owego	
27	Hope Cemetery and Mausoleum	Hope Cemetery and Mausoleum	March 16, 1998 (#98000164)	Main St., at the town limits 42°12′39″N 76°11′25″W	Newark Valley	
28	Knapp House	Knapp House	March 16, 1998 (#98000159)	10 Rock St. 42°13′24″N 76°11′00″W	Newark Valley	
29	Lipe Farm	Lipe Farm	March 16, 1998 (#98000160)	3462 Sherry Lipe Rd. 42°11′56″N 76°09′56″W	Newark Valley	
30	Maple Lawn Farm	Maple Lawn Farm	December 15, 1997 (#97001487)	10981 NY 38; 42°15′39″N 76°11′00″W	Newark Valley	
31	John W. McCarty House	John W. McCarty House	March 12, 2001 (#01000249)	118 Main St. 42°13′52″N 76°20′27″W	Candor	
32	Newark Valley Municipal Building and Tappan-Spaulding Memorial Library	Newark Valley Municipal Building and Tappan-Spaulding Memorial Library	November 1, 2006 (#06000971)	9 Park St. and 8 Rock St. 42°13′25″N 76°11′02″W	Newark Valley	
33	Nichols High School	Nichols High School	May 16, 1996 (#96000553)	84 Cady Ave. 42°01′14″N 76°21′54″W	Nichols	
34	Nowland House	Nowland House	December 15, 1997 (#97001488)	88 S. Main St. 42°13′10″N 76°11′14″W	Newark Valley	
35	Owego Central Historic District	Owego Central Historic District	December 3, 1980 (#80002780)	North Ave., Park, Main, Lake, Court, and Fronts Sts. 42°06′06″N 76°15′40″W	Owego	
36	Platt-Cady Mansion	Platt-Cady Mansion	August 13, 1976 (#76001286)	18 River St. 42°01′19″N 76°22′00″W	Nichols	
37	Gilbert E. Purple House	Gilbert E. Purple House	September 15, 2004 (#04000992)	34 Maple Ave. 42°13′36″N 76°11′20″W	Newark Valley	
38	Riverside Cemetery	Riverside Cemetery	January 15, 2014 (#13001093)	Marshland Rd. 42°05′08″N 76°09′34″W	Apalachin vicinity	Final resting place of many early settlers of region
39	Deodatus Royce House	Deodatus Royce House	July 2, 1984 (#84003109)	NY 38; 42°19′26″N 76°11′02″W	Berkshire	
40	J. B. Royce House and Farm Complex		July 2, 1984 (#84003111)	NY 38; 42°19′42″N 76°10′46″W	Berkshire	
41	St. Paul's Church	St. Paul's Church	October 16, 1997 (#97001204)	117 Main St. 42°06′09″N 76°15′55″W	Owego	
42	John Settle Farm	John Settle Farm	March 16, 1998 (#98000161)	1054 Settle Rd. 42°12′31″N 76°07′44″W	Newark Valley	
43	Silk Street Bridge	Silk Street Bridge	April 30, 1998 (#98000430)	Silk St., over E Branch of Owego Cr. 42°13′03″N 76°11′38″W	Newark Valley	
44	Sutton-Chapman-Howland House	Sutton-Chapman-Howland House	December 15, 1997 (#97001492)	55 Main St. 42°16′22″N 76°10′28″W	Newark Valley	
45	Tioga Centre General Store	Tioga Centre General Store	January 15, 2003 (#02001709)	3019 NY 17C; 42°03′25″N 76°20′53″W	Tioga Center	
46	Tioga County Courthouse	Tioga County Courthouse	December 26, 1972 (#72000915)	Village Park; 42°06′09″N 76°15′45″W	Owego	
47	US Post Office-Owego	US Post Office-Owego	May 11, 1989 (#88002391)	6 Lake St. 42°06′10″N 76°15′41″W	Owego	
48	US Post Office-Waverly	US Post Office-Waverly	May 11, 1989 (#88002444)	434-348 Waverly St. 42°00′07″N 76°32′26″W	Waverly	
49	Vesper Cliff	Vesper Cliff	July 29, 2005 (#05000746)	Outside Village of Owego, W bank of Owego Creek, off NY 17; 42°05′54″N 76°16′45″W	Owego	
50	Wade Farm	Wade Farm	December 15, 1997 (#97001491)	5579 NY 38; 42°11′17″N 76°12′34″W	Newark Valley	
51	Waits Methodist Episcopal Church and Cemetery	Waits Methodist Episcopal Church and Cemetery	November 20, 2000 (#00001290)	Waite Rd. 42°00′27″N 76°16′08″W	Owego	
52	Waverly Junior and Senior High School		November 7, 1997 (#97001389)	443 Pennsylvania Ave. 42°00′14″N 76°32′18″W	Waverly	
53	Waverly Village Hall	Waverly Village Hall	July 5, 2003 (#03000600)	358-360 Broad St. 42°00′03″N 76°32′22″W	Waverly	
54	West Newark Congregational Church and Cemetery	West Newark Congregational Church and Cemetery	March 16, 1998 (#98000165)	Jct. of W. Creek Rd. and W. Newark Cross Rd. 42°14′32″N 76°14′09″W	Newark Valley	
55	West Newark School House	West Newark School House	March 16, 1998 (#98000163)	Jct. of W. Creek Rd. and W. Newark Cross Rd. 42°14′30″N 76°14′12″W	Newark Valley	

== See also ==
- National Register of Historic Places listings in New York
- List of New York State Historic Markers in Tioga County, New York
