= First Presbyterian Church (Spencer, New York) =

Historic church in New York, United States

- U.S. National Register of Historic Places
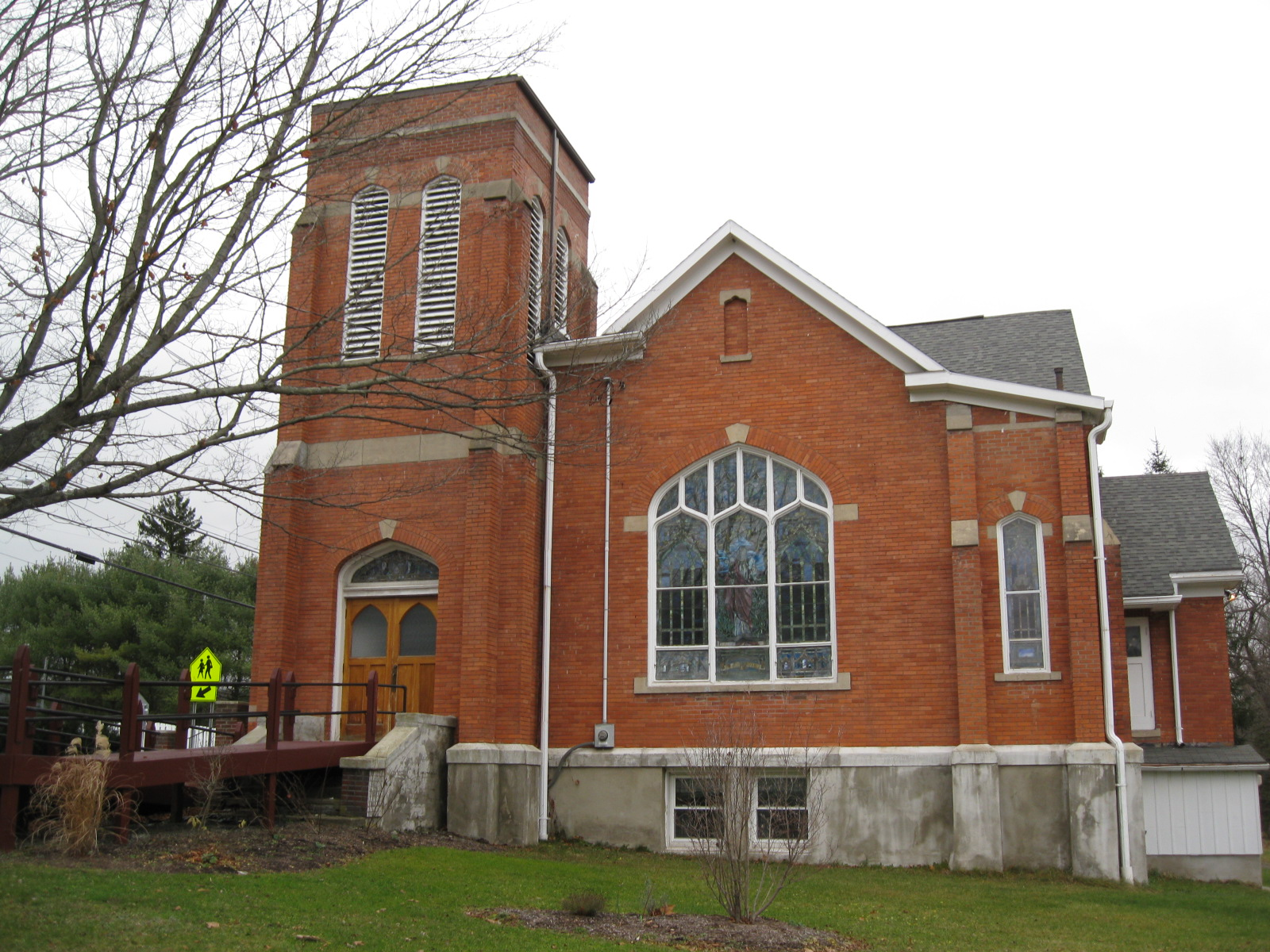
- First Presbyterian Church, November 2009

- Location within New York Location within the United States
- Location: 75-77 N. Main St., Spencer, New York
- Coordinates: 42°12′50″N 76°29′33″W
- Area: less than one acre
- Built: 1915
- Architect: Barber, ?; Vorhis, Carl
- Architectural style: Gothic Revival
- NRHP reference No.: 05001392
- Added to NRHP: December 07, 2005

First Presbyterian Church is a historic Presbyterian church located at Spencer in Tioga County, New York. It is a Gothic Revival style, generally rectangular-shaped structure built in 1915. It is constructed of brick with stone trim on a concrete foundation and features a square bell tower at the southwest corner of the building. The interior layout is based upon the Akron plan. It also features 14 stained glass windows designed by Henry Keck of Syracuse, New York.

It was listed on the National Register of Historic Places in 2005.

The building is occupied by Christ the King Fellowship, a congregation of the Presbyterian Church (USA).
