= Nathaniel Bishop Collins House =

Historic house in New York, United States

- U.S. National Register of Historic Places
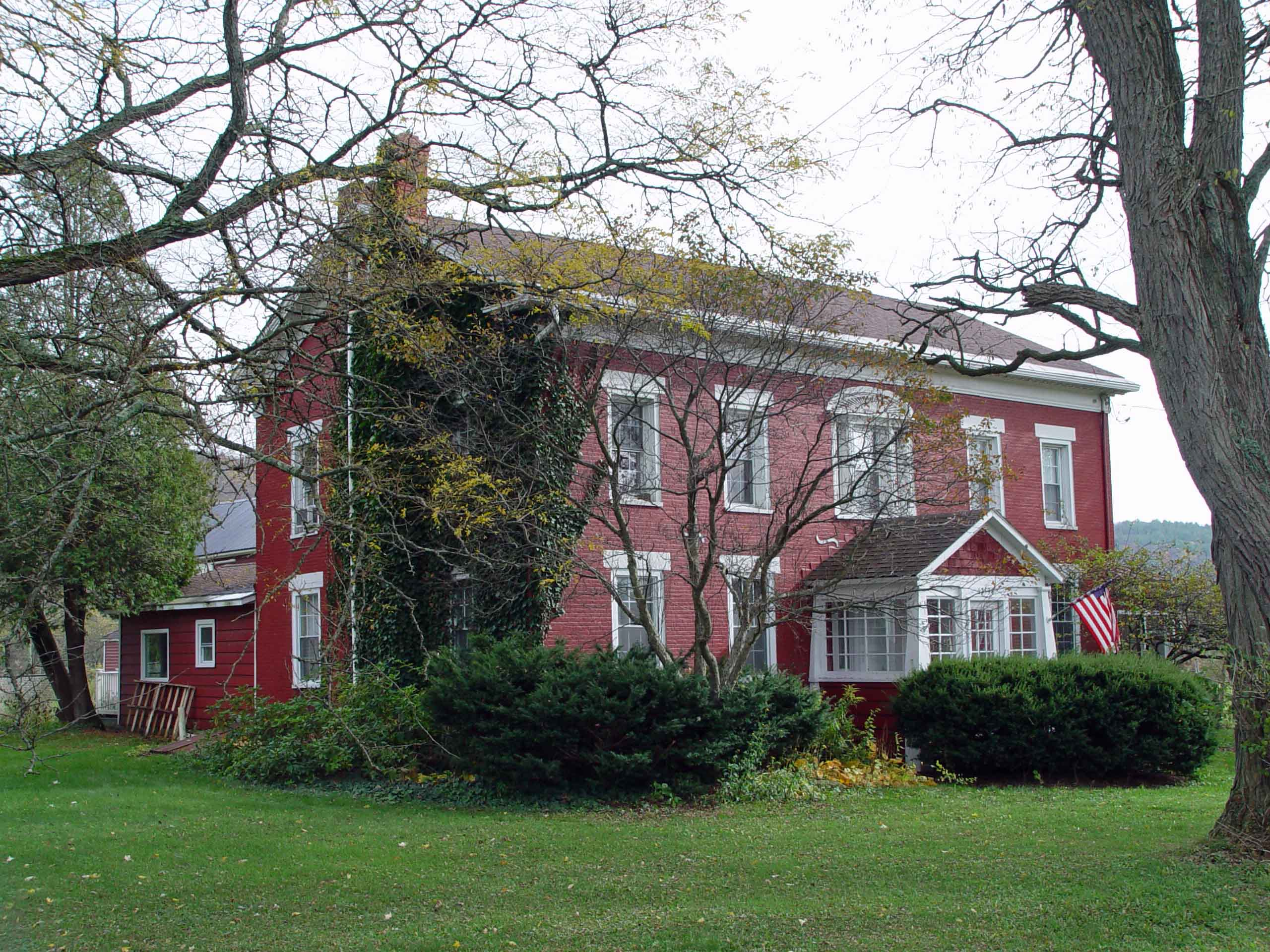

- Location within New York Location within the United States
- Location: NY 38, Berkshire, New York
- Coordinates: 42°18′40″N 76°11′4″W
- Area: 2.3 acres (0.93 ha)
- Built: 1830; 196 years ago
- Architectural style: Federal
- MPS: Berkshire MRA
- NRHP reference No.: 84003096
- Added to NRHP: July 02, 1984

Nathaniel Bishop Collins House is a historic home located at Berkshire in Tioga County, New York. It is a two-story, five-bay center hall, Federal style house built of brick above a stone foundation. The house was built about 1830. Also on the property is a contributing mid-19th-century carriage barn, a lean-to shed, and an early 20th-century chicken house.

It was listed on the National Register of Historic Places in 1984.
