= Belcher Family Homestead and Farm =

Historic house in New York, United States

- U.S. National Register of Historic Places
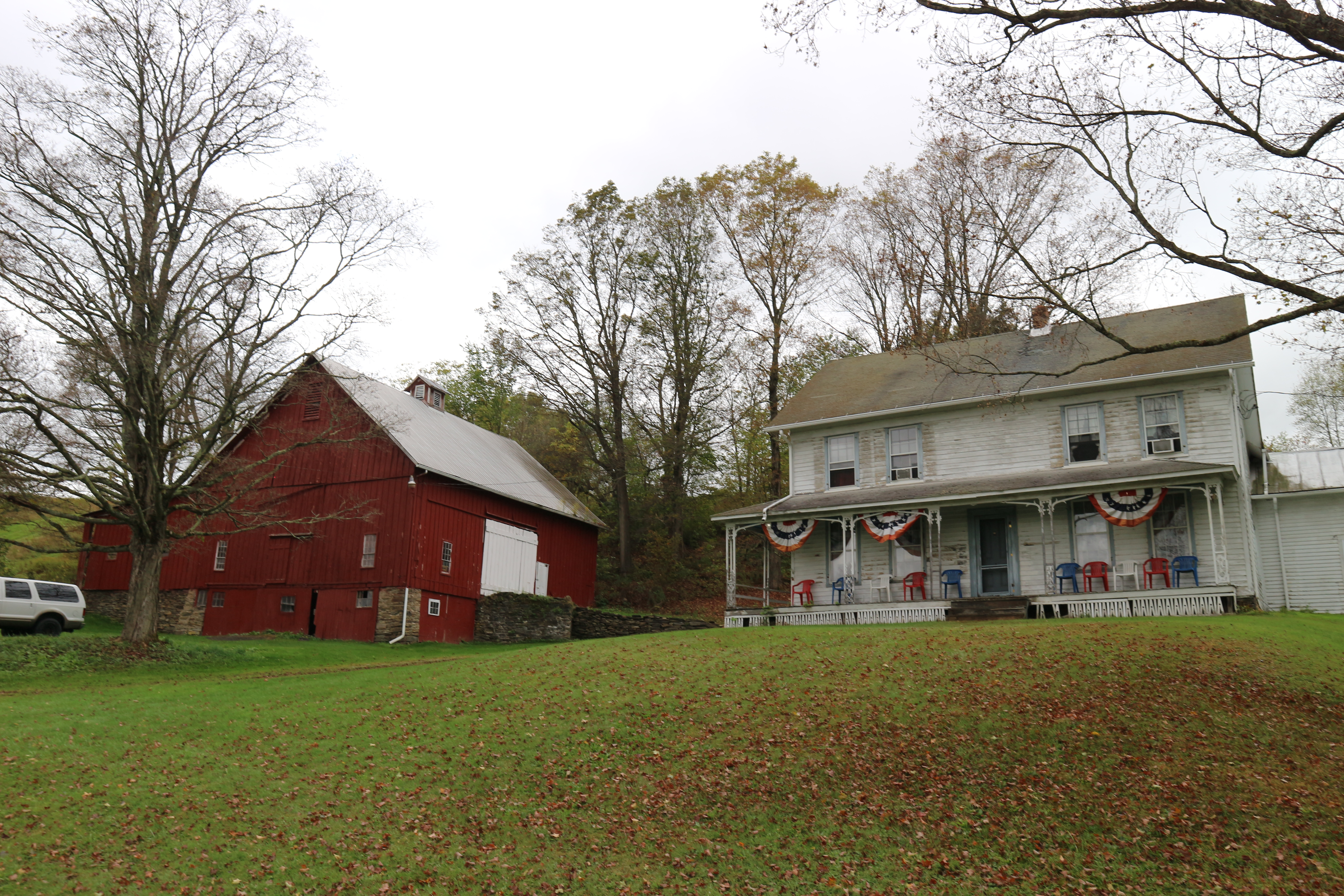

- Location within New York Location within the United States
- Location: NY 38, Berkshire, New York
- Coordinates: 42°17′2″N 76°11′18″W
- Area: 199 acres (81 ha)
- Built: 1815
- Architectural style: Gothic Revival, Federal
- MPS: Berkshire MRA
- NRHP reference No.: 84003082
- Added to NRHP: July 02, 1984

Belcher Family Homestead and Farm is a historic home and farm complex located at Berkshire in Tioga County, New York. The farmhouse is a two-story, five-bay frame house built about 1850 in a vernacular Gothic Revival style with a porch with Carpenter Gothic details. A second house, a 1 1/2-story, five-bay frame structure, was built about 1815 in a vernacular Federal style. Also on the property is a mid-19th-century barn, a late 19th-century dairy barn with silo, and a small shed.

It was listed on the National Register of Historic Places in 1984.

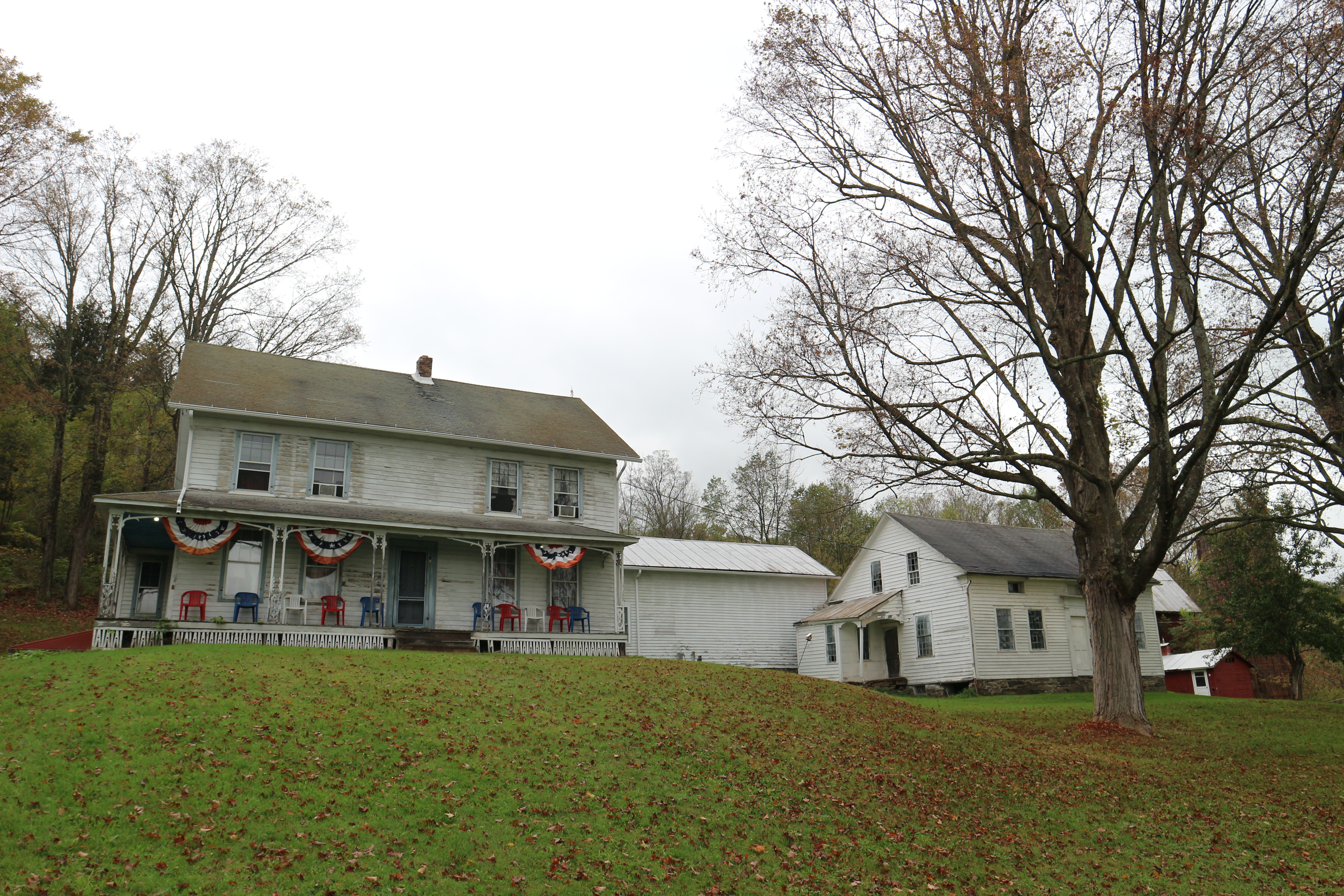

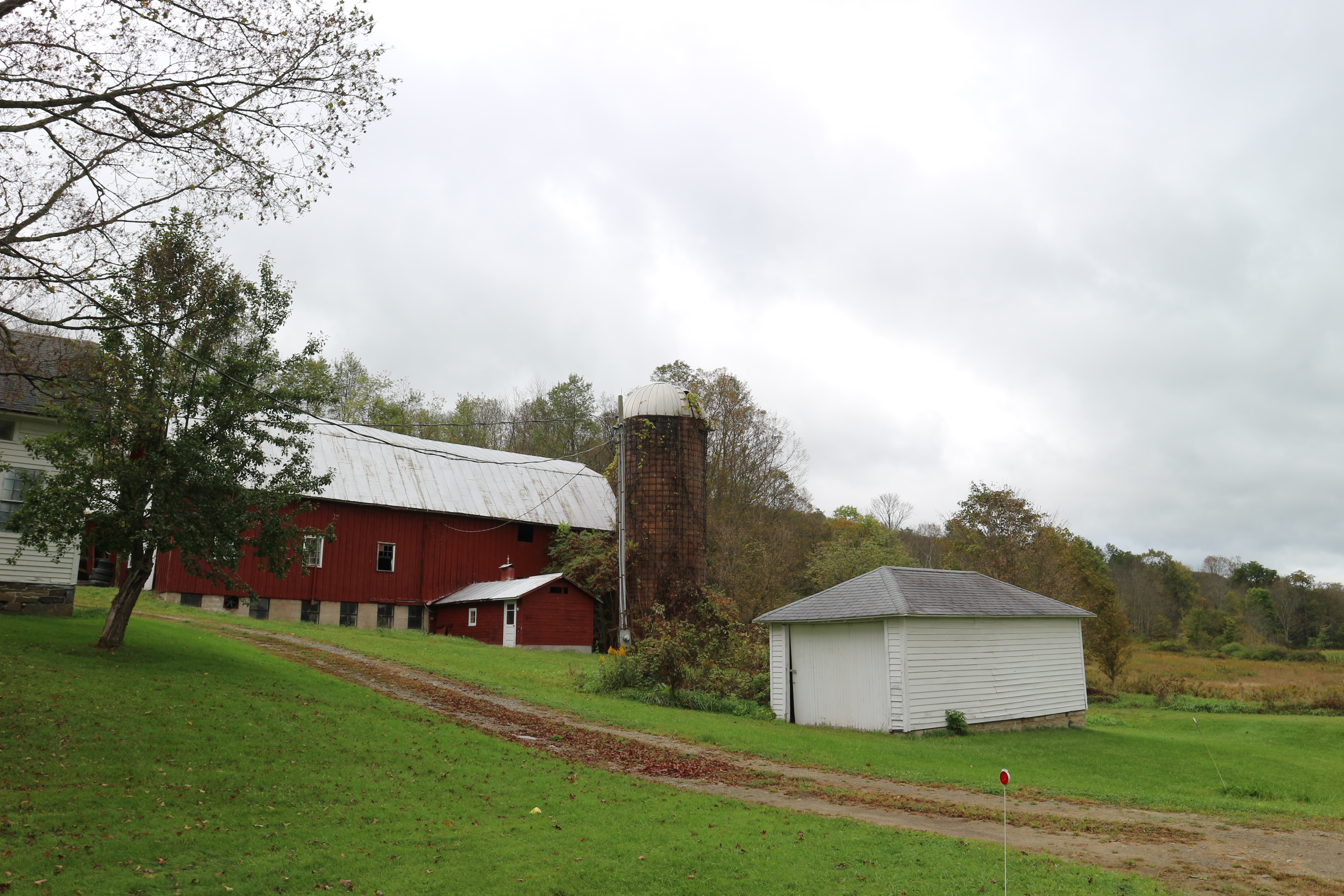
