= Stephen Ball House =

Historic house in New York, United States

- U.S. National Register of Historic Places
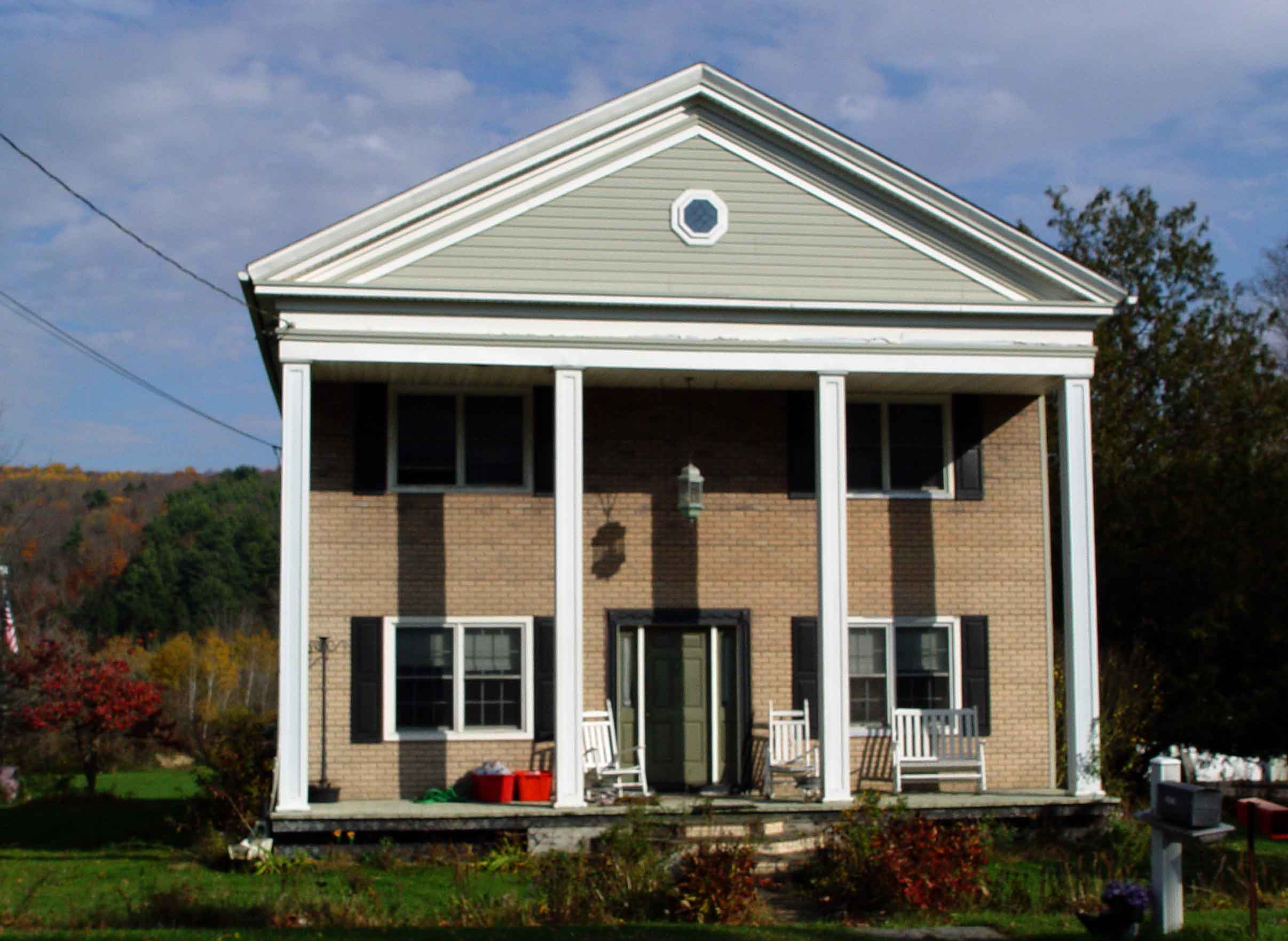

- Location within New York Location within the United States
- Location: Main St., East Side South of Glen Road; Berkshire, New York
- Coordinates: 42°18′4″N 76°11′15″W
- Area: 2 acres (0.81 ha)
- Built: 1849
- Architectural style: Greek Revival
- MPS: Berkshire MRA
- NRHP reference No.: 84003077
- Added to NRHP: July 02, 1984

The Stephen Ball House (also known as Old Ball Mansion) is a historic house located on Main Street in Berkshire, Tioga County, New York.

== Description and history ==
It is a Greek Revival style temple form frame house built in about 1849. The house is a two-story, four bay wide house with a four pier portico and single-story rear wing.

Stephen Ball was the son of Josiah Ball and an early settler of the area. He lived in Berkshire at least since 1808. Stephen Ball was a local landowner and in 1833 sold the plot for the church just north of this home. Ball ran a local brickyard and owned a local tavern.

The home has remained in the Ball family at least until 1980. The home was listed on the National Register of Historic Places on July 2, 1984.
