= J. B. Royce House and Farm Complex =

Historic house in New York, United States

- U.S. National Register of Historic Places
- Location within New York Location within the United States
- Location: NY 38, Berkshire, New York
- Coordinates: 42°19′42″N 76°10′46″W
- Area: 50 acres (20 ha)
- Built: 1829
- Architectural style: Greek Revival, Gothic Revival
- MPS: Berkshire MRA
- NRHP reference No.: 84003111
- Added to NRHP: July 02, 1984

J. B. Royce House and Farm Complex is a historic home and farm complex located at Berkshire in Tioga County, New York. The house was built about 1829 in a vernacular Greek Revival style. About 1850 it was extensively altered with the construction of a higher, more steeply pitched roof and an ell-shaped Gothic Revival style porch with Tudor-arched details. Also on the property is a contributing mid-19th century barn with decorative bargeboards, a shed, and a small Greek Revival structure now used as a garage.

It was listed on the National Register of Historic Places in 1984.
