= Robert Akins House =

Historic house in New York, United States

- U.S. National Register of Historic Places
- Location within New York Location within the United States
- Location: Main St., West Side, Just North of Glen Rd; Berkshire, New York
- Coordinates: 42°18′7″N 76°11′17″W
- Area: less than one acre
- Built: c. 1827
- Architectural style: Federal
- MPS: Berkshire MRA
- NRHP reference No.: 84003069
- Added to NRHP: July 2, 1984

The Robert Akins House (also known as the Honey House) was a historic house located on Main Street in Berkshire, Tioga County, New York.

== Description and history ==
It was a Federal style house built in about 1830. It was a two-story, three bay wide, gable-roofed brick structure with a side entrance layout.

It was listed on the National Register of Historic Places on July 2, 1984. Sometime afterwards the house was demolished. On the lot stands a modern prefabricated home.
