= Waits Methodist Episcopal Church and Cemetery =

Historic site in Tioga County, New York, US

- U.S. National Register of Historic Places
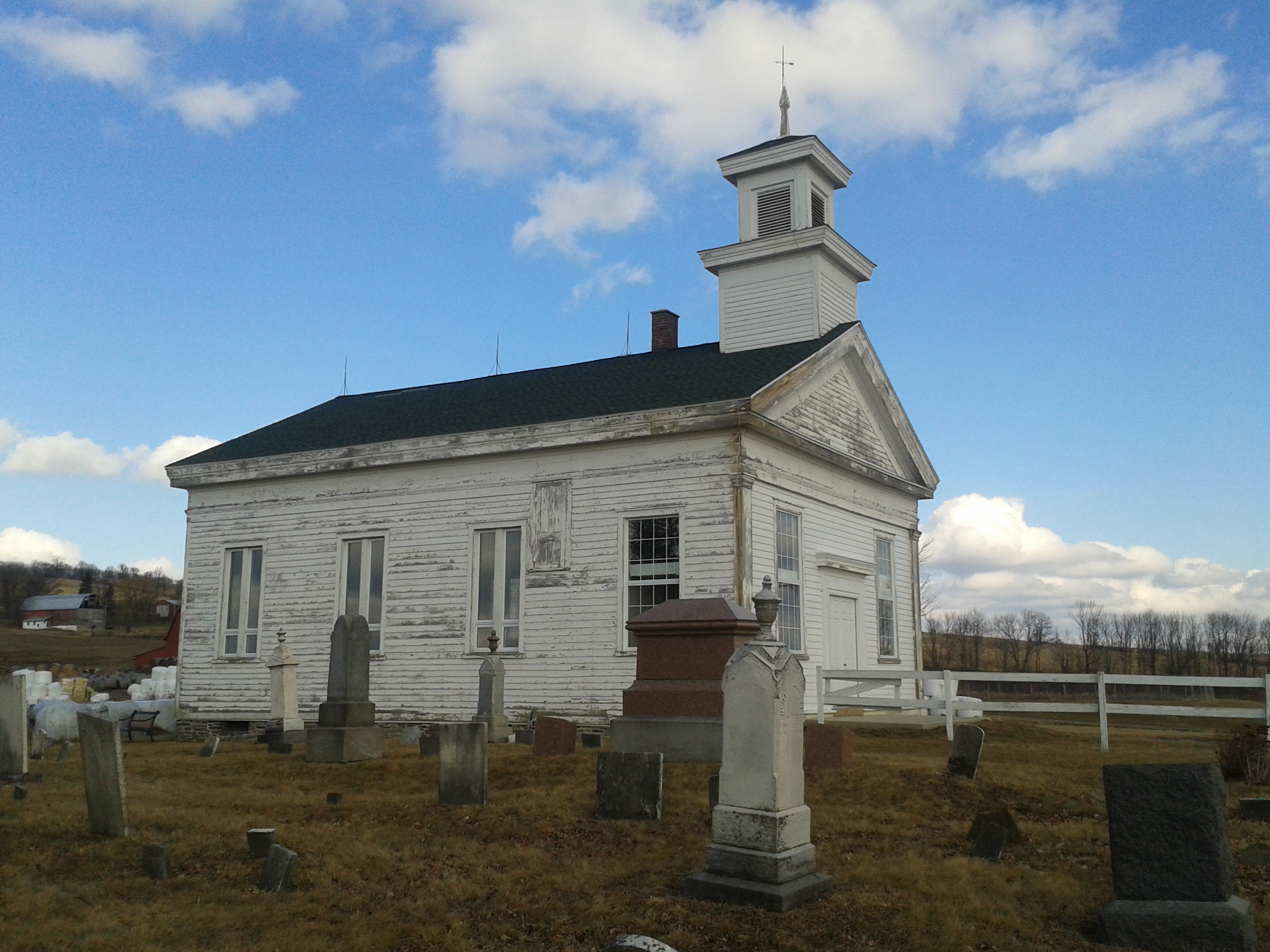
- Waits Methodist Episcopal Church and Cemetery, February 2012

- Location within New York Location within the United States
- Location: Waite Rd., Owego, New York
- Coordinates: 42°0′27″N 76°16′8″W
- Area: less than one acre
- Built: 1853
- Architect: Dunham, Henry; Orcutt
- Architectural style: Greek Revival
- NRHP reference No.: 00001290
- Added to NRHP: November 20, 2000

Waits Methodist Episcopal Church and Cemetery is a historic Methodist Episcopal church and cemetery located at what was once known as Waits, in the town of Owego in Tioga County, New York. It is a Greek Revival–style structure built in 1853 of white pine from Windham, Pennsylvania. It is a 1 1/2-story building, three bays wide and four bays deep, measuring approximately 30 feet by 40 feet. The interior was remodeled in 1866 and it retains all of its fabric from that time. Also on the property is a small settlement period cemetery.

It was listed on the National Register of Historic Places in 2000.

== History ==
In 1819, Henry Wait, Sr. purchased 900 acres of land in the southern tier of New York state and south of the Susquehanna River in Tioga County, New York. This farm, and the area surrounding it became known as Wait Settlement, "..which name continued until a post office was established, and the name was changed to Waits. The establishment of a church there had its beginning in about 1837, when the Wait Settlement class was organized. The class held services at the school house until the building of a church in 1853. The class continued to meet until 1852, when a society was formed at the school house on June 9 in that year. The society was incorporated as "The Trustees of the Wait Settlement of the Methodist Episcopal Church." The trustees elected were John Wait (son of Henry, Sr), Nathaniel Goodspeed, W. White, Simmons W. Harden, S. B. Harden, and Henry Wait, Jr.

"The deed for the acre of land was not executed until Dec. 5, 1866. The society was incorporated for the second time on June 5, 1865, the same title having been retained. John Wait, James A. Nichols, Henry Dunham, James Olmstead, and Orin D. Nichols were elected as trustees.

"The most extensive alterations on the church were made in 1886, which cost $820. The church was reopened on December 15, the Rev. Wilson Treible delivering the dedicatory sermon and the Rev. Mr. H. M. Cryndenwise conducting the dedicatory services."
