= J. Ball House =

Historic house in New York, United States

- U.S. National Register of Historic Places
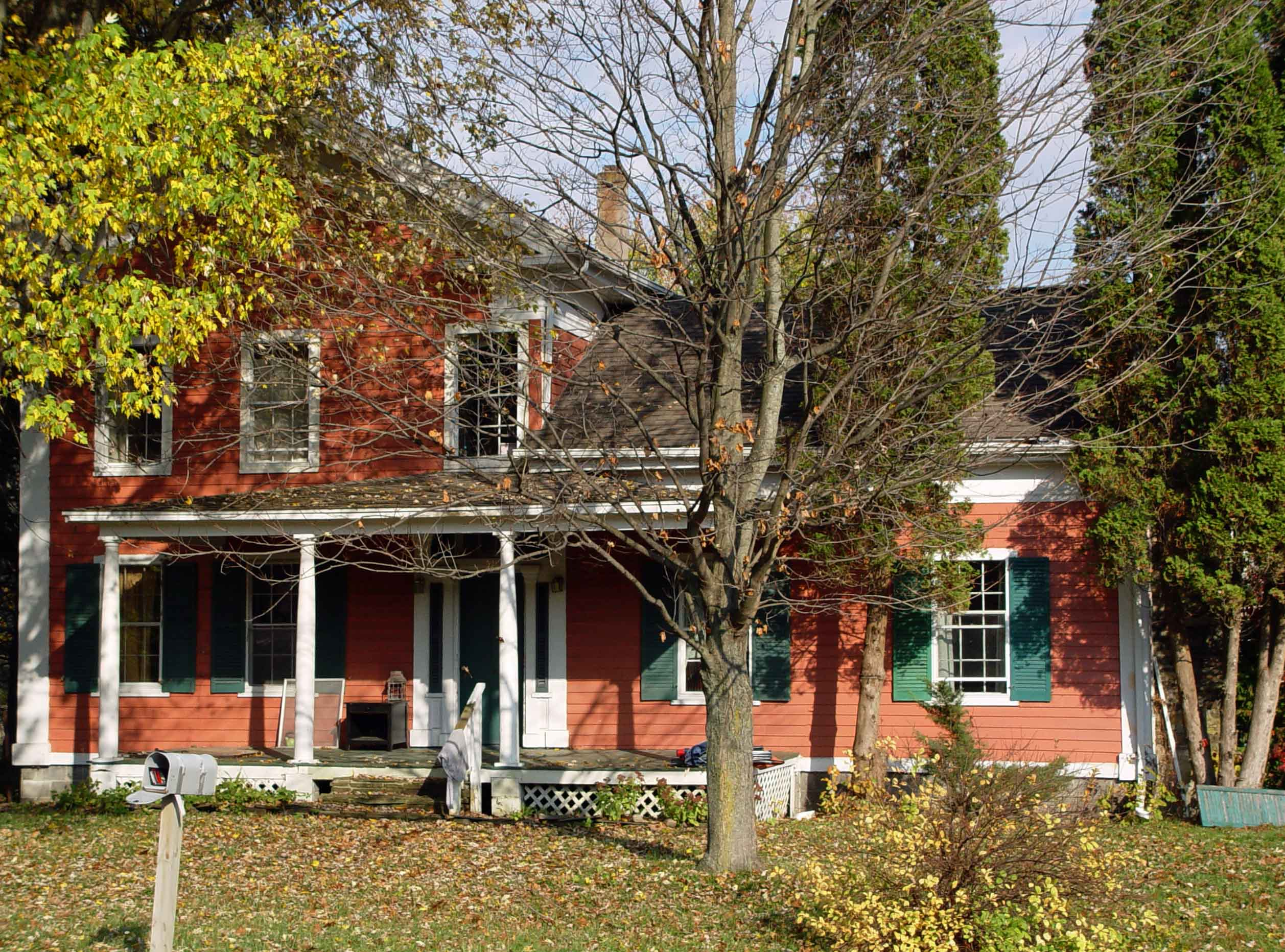

- Location within New York Location within the United States
- Location: East Side of NY 38, Berkshire, New York
- Coordinates: 42°17′53″N 76°11′10″W
- Area: less than one acre
- Built: 1850
- Architectural style: Greek Revival
- MPS: Berkshire MRA
- NRHP reference No.: 84003072
- Added to NRHP: July 2, 1984

The J. Ball House is a historic house located at Berkshire in Tioga County, New York.

== Description and history ==
It is a vernacular Greek Revival style frame house built in about 1850. It consists of a two-story, three-bay wide, gable roofed main section with a one-story, two bay side ell. The siding of the house is clapboard. Also on the property is a large gambrel roofed dairy barn.

Additions of a 20th-century front and rear porches have been made as well as a modern chimney. Foundation has been rebuilt.

The house was owned in 1855 by J. Ball, son of Isaac Ball, who is believed to have settled at this site in 1808. It was listed on the National Register of Historic Places on July 2, 1984.
