= Tioga Terrace, New York =

- Census-designated place
- Location within New York Location within the United States
- Coordinates: 42°3′6″N 76°7′12″W
- Country: United States
- State: New York
- County: Tioga
- Town: Owego

Area
  - Total: 1.00 sq mi (2.60 km^{2})
  - Land: 1.00 sq mi (2.60 km^{2})
  - Water: 0 sq mi (0.00 km^{2})
- Elevation: 980 ft (300 m)

Population (2020)
  - Total: 2,082
  - Density: 2,077.1/sq mi (801.99/km^{2})
- Time zone: UTC-5 (Eastern (EST))
  - Summer (DST): UTC-4 (EDT)
- ZIP Code: 13732 (Apalachin)
- Area code: 607
- FIPS code: 36-73990
- GNIS feature ID: 2806978

Tioga Terrace is a neighborhood and census-designated place (CDP) in the town of Owego, Tioga County, New York, United States. It was first listed as a CDP prior to the 2020 census. As of the 2020 census, Tioga Terrace had a population of 2,082.

The community is in southeastern Tioga County, on the eastern side of Owego. It is bordered to the east by the town of Vestal in Broome County, to the west by the hamlet of Apalachin, and to the north by New York State Route 434 in the valley of the Susquehanna River. NY-434 leads east-northeast 12 miles (19 km) to Binghamton and northwest 9 miles (14 km) to the village of Owego. Interstate 86 runs parallel to NY-434, just to the north of the CDP, with the closest access from Exit 66 in Apalachin.

== Demographics ==
Historical population
Census	Pop.	Note	%±
2020	2,082		—
U.S. Decennial Census

== Education ==
The CDP is in the Vestal Central School District.
