= Levi Ball House =

Historic house in New York, United States

- U.S. National Register of Historic Places
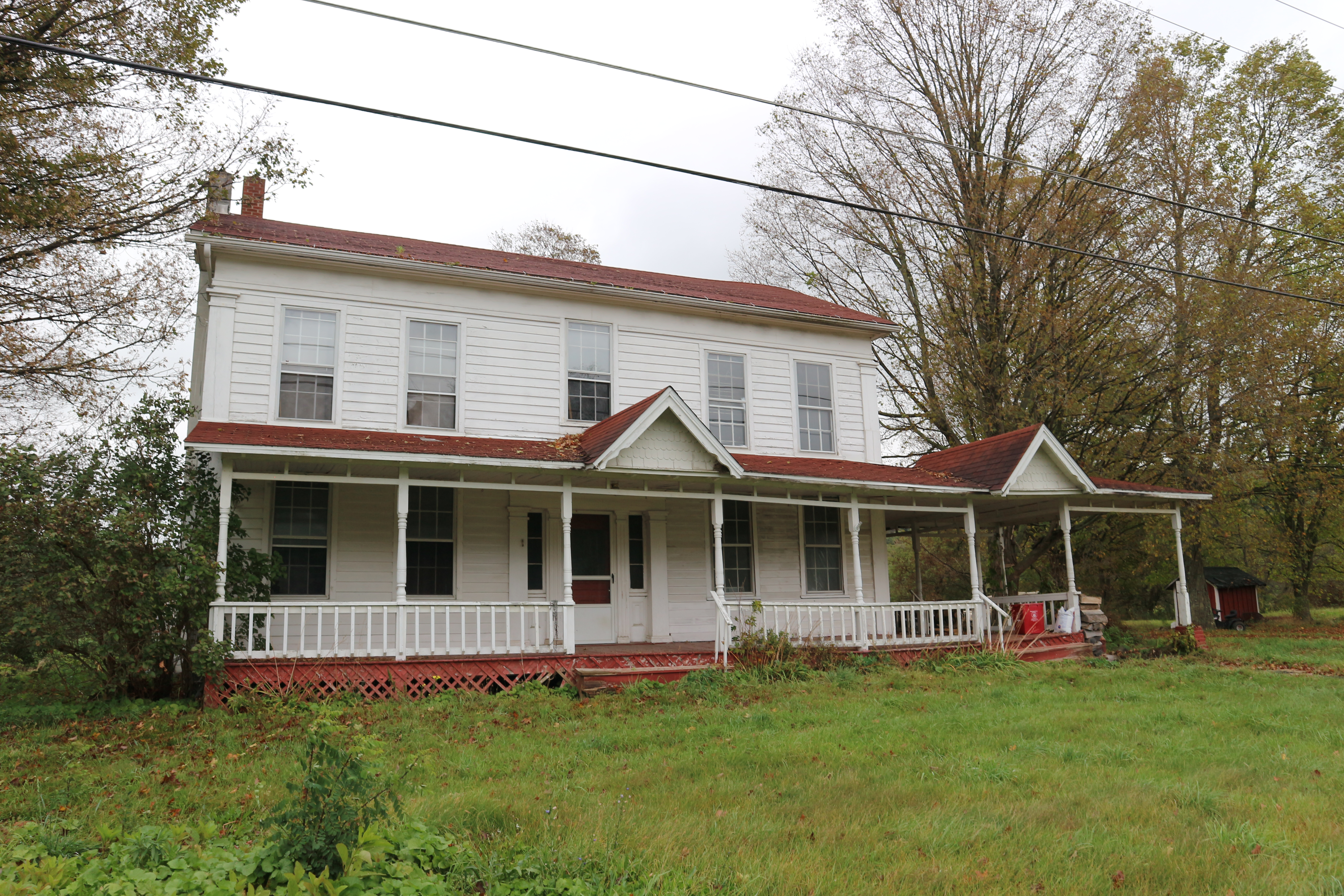

- Location within New York Location within the United States
- Location: NY 38, Berkshire, New York
- Coordinates: 42°19′31″N 76°10′56″W
- Area: 12 acres (4.9 ha)
- Built: 1840
- Architectural style: Greek Revival, Federal
- MPS: Berkshire MRA
- NRHP reference No.: 84003075
- Added to NRHP: July 2, 1984

The Levi Ball House is a historic house located at Berkshire in Tioga County, New York.

== Description and history ==
It is a transitional Federal/Greek Revival style frame house built in about 1840. The house is a two-story, five bay center hall structure. Also on the property is a contributing group of farm buildings including a late 19th-century barn with silo, a chicken house, a garage, and a small shed.

It was listed on the National Register of Historic Places on July 2, 1984.
