= Hiawatha Farm =

Historic house in New York, United States

- U.S. National Register of Historic Places
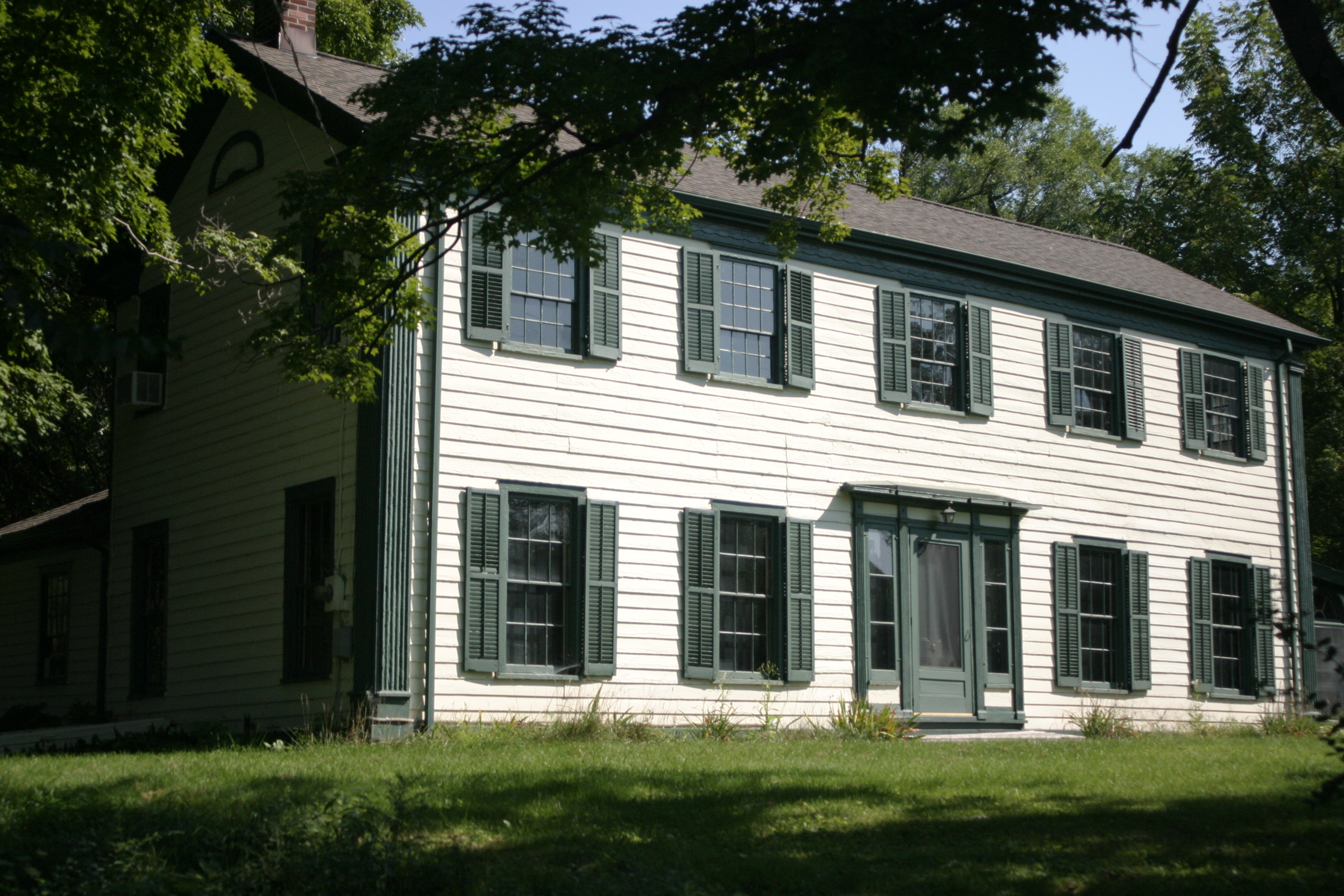

- Location within New York Location within the United States
- Location: 2293 NY 17C, Owego, New York
- Coordinates: 42°5′30″N 76°12′46″W
- Area: 2 acres (0.81 ha)
- Architectural style: Federal
- NRHP reference No.: 98000551
- Added to NRHP: May 20, 1998

Hiawatha Farm, also known as the Levi Green and Mary Montanye House, is a historic home and farm complex located at Owego in Tioga County, New York. The two story, five bay center entrance house was built about 1825 in the transitional Federal / Greek Revival style. Also on the property an English barn dating to the 1820s, garage, and chicken house.

It was listed on the National Register of Historic Places in 1998.
