= Calvin A. Buffington House =

Historic house in New York, United States

- U.S. National Register of Historic Places
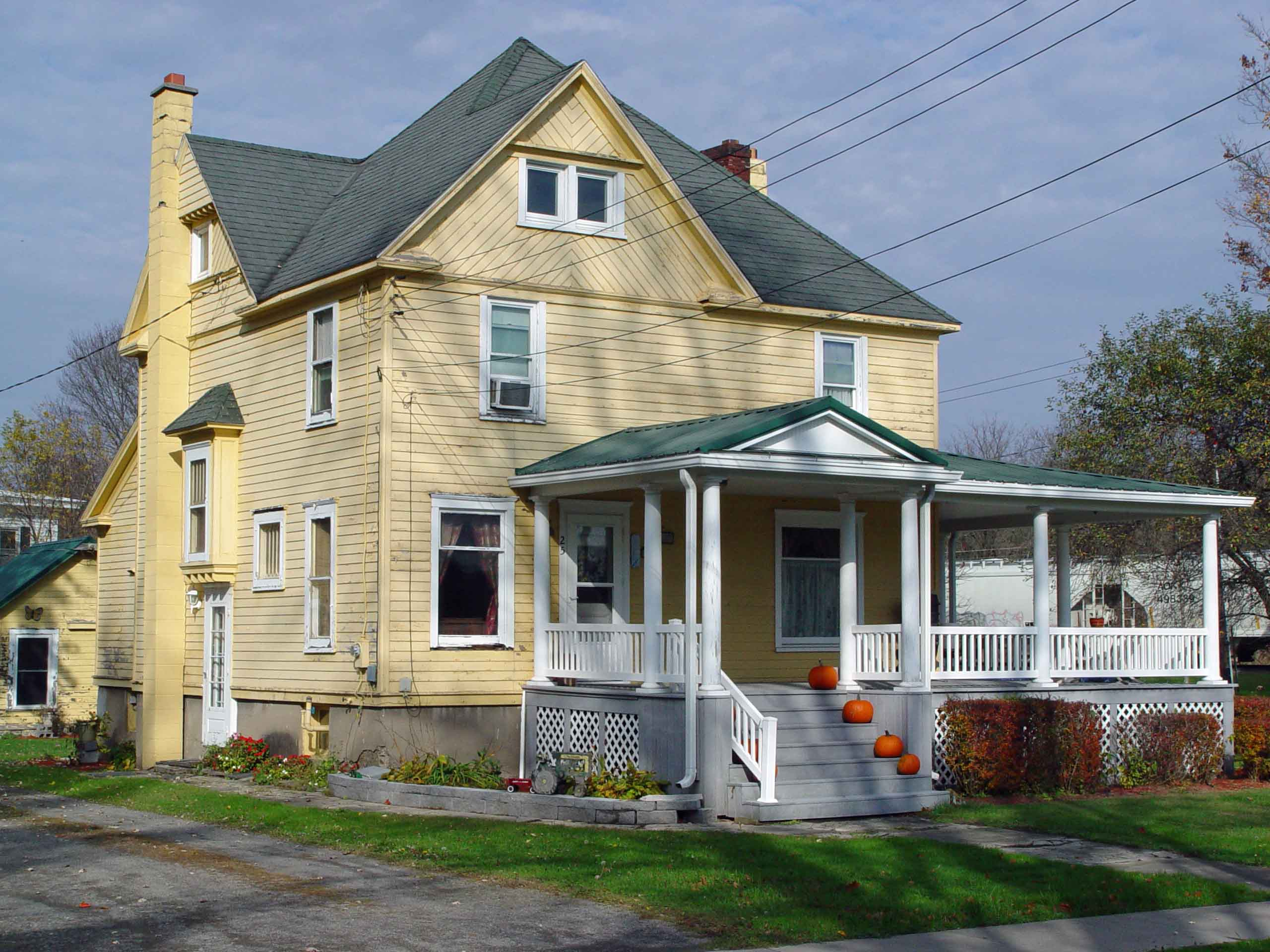

- Location within New York Location within the United States
- Location: Depot St. and Railroad Ave., Berkshire, New York
- Coordinates: 42°18′15″N 76°11′5″W
- Area: less than one acre
- Built: 1909
- MPS: Berkshire MRA
- NRHP reference No.: 84003089
- Added to NRHP: July 2, 1984

The Calvin A. Buffington House is a historic house located at Depot Street and Railroad Avenue in Berkshire, Tioga County, New York.

== Description and history ==
It is a two-story, frame pattern book house, built in 1909. Also on the property is a contributing frame garage and slate sidewalk. It was the home of Calvin A. Buffington, who patented a folding chair design that he manufactured in Berkshire until 1926.

It was listed on the National Register of Historic Places on July 2, 1984.
