= Lebbeus Ford House =

Historic house in New York, United States

- U.S. National Register of Historic Places
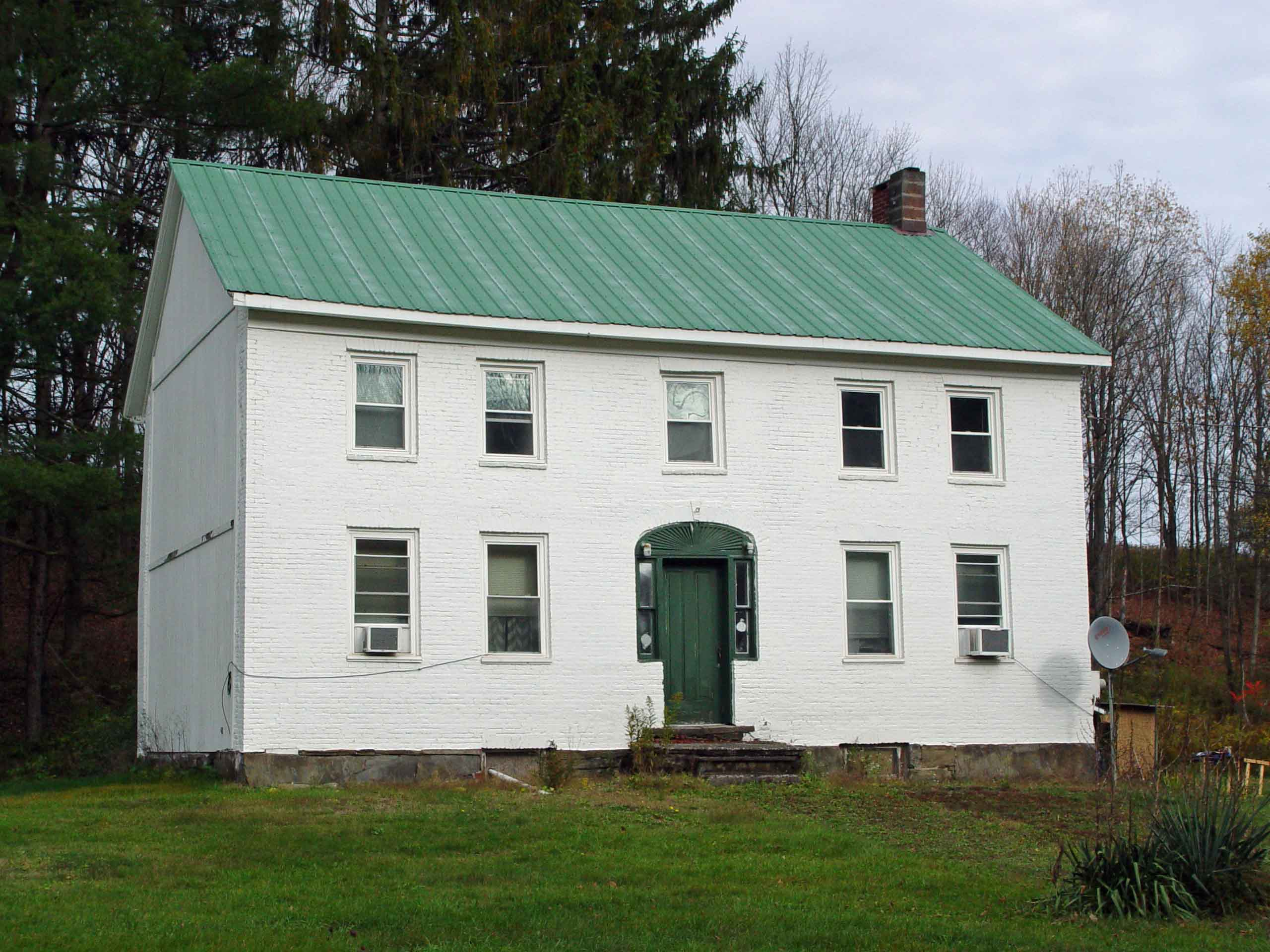

- Location within New York Location within the United States
- Location: Jewett Hill Rd., Berkshire, New York
- Coordinates: 42°18′40″N 76°11′37″W
- Area: 9.5 acres (3.8 ha)
- Built: c. 1830
- Architectural style: Federal
- MPS: Berkshire MRA
- NRHP reference No.: 84003104
- Added to NRHP: July 2, 1984

The Lebbeus Ford House is a historic house located on Jewett Hill Road in Berkshire, Tioga County, New York.

== Description and history ==
The house was built in about 1830, and is a two-story, five-bay wide, brick structure with a central hall plan, designed in a vernacular Federal style. It features an original entry with sidelights, elliptical louvered fan, and two-panel door.

It was listed on the National Register of Historic Places on July 2, 1984.
