= Lyman P. Akins House =

Historic house in New York, United States

- U.S. National Register of Historic Places
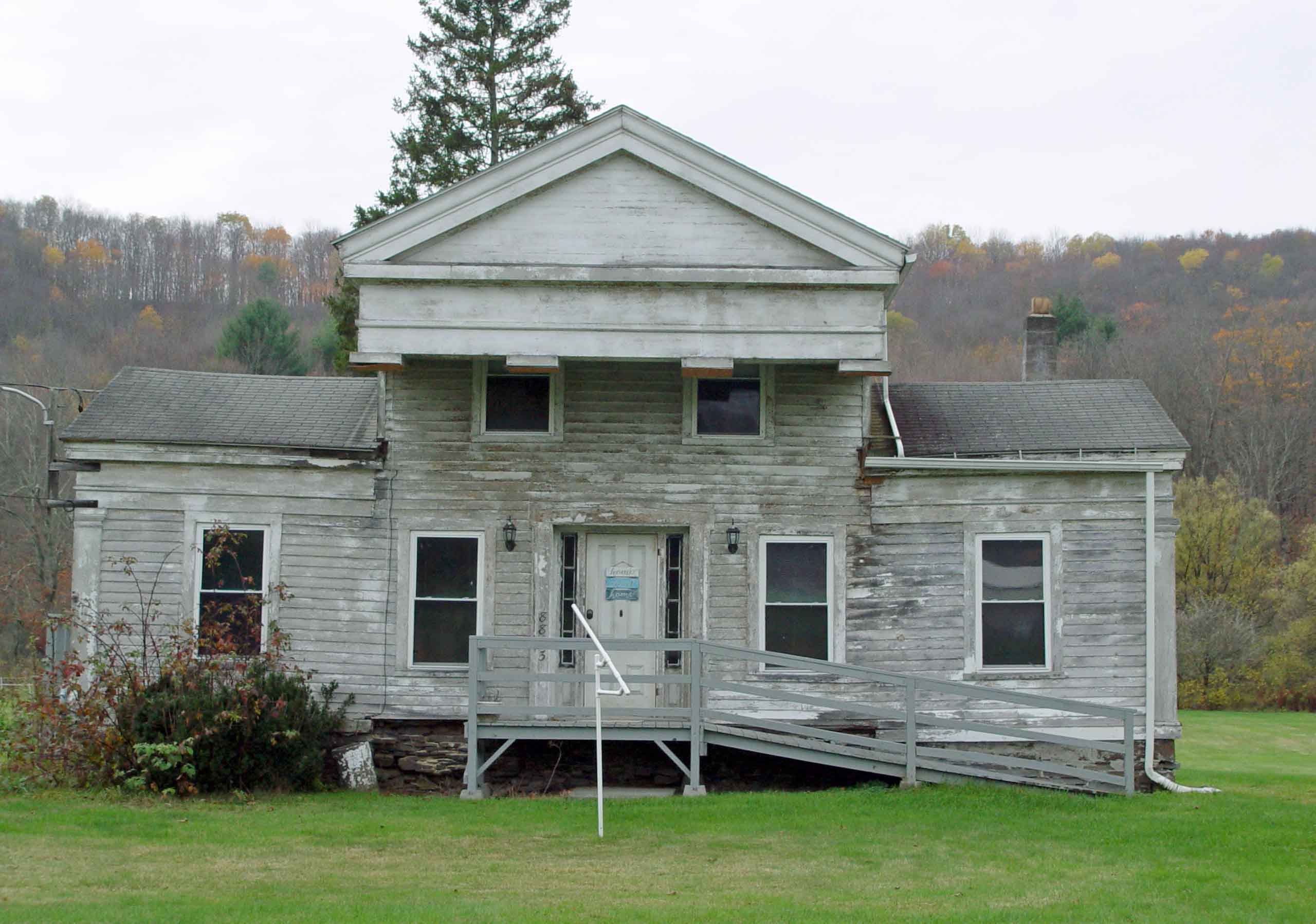

- Location within New York Location within the United States
- Location: West Creek Road, Berkshire, New York
- Coordinates: 42°18′53″N 76°14′56″W
- Area: 1.5 acres (0.61 ha)
- Built: c. 1840
- Architectural style: Greek Revival
- MPS: Berkshire MRA
- NRHP reference No.: 84003067
- Added to NRHP: July 02, 1984

Lyman P. Akins House is a historic house located at Berkshire in Tioga County, New York. It is a Greek Revival style temple-form house built about 1840.

== Description and history ==
The house consists of a two-story central block with pedimented portico and lower, flanking wings.

It was listed on the National Register of Historic Places on July 2, 1984.
