= Berkshire Village Historic District =

Historic district in New York, United States

- U.S. National Register of Historic Places
- U.S. Historic district
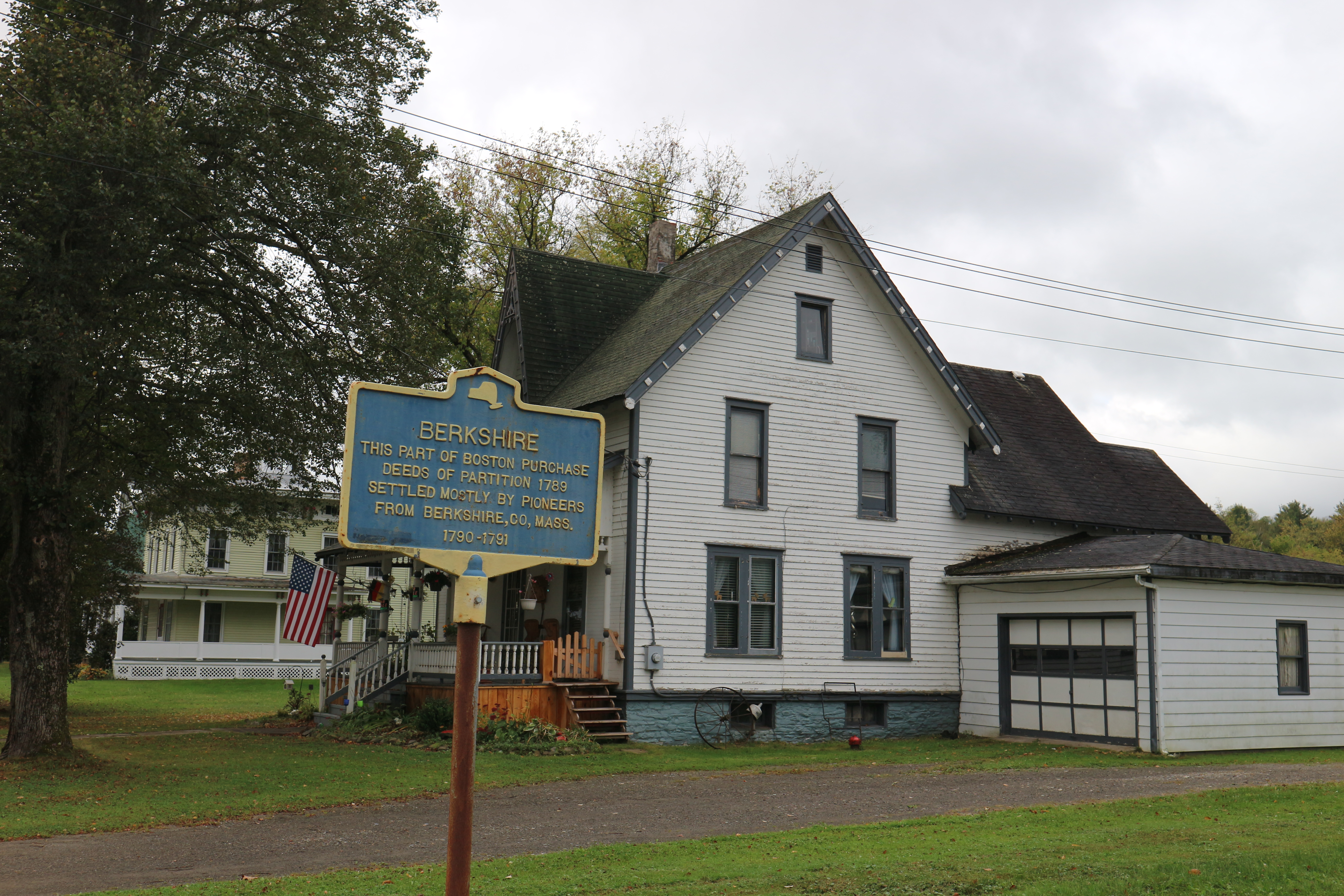

- Location within New York Location within the United States
- Location: Main St. and Leonard Ave., Berkshire, New York
- Coordinates: 42°18′22″N 76°11′14″W
- Area: 19 acres (7.7 ha)
- Built: 1820
- Architect: Pierce & Dockstader et al.
- Architectural style: Greek Revival, Late Victorian, Federal
- MPS: Berkshire MRA
- NRHP reference No.: 84003086
- Added to NRHP: July 02, 1984

Berkshire Village Historic District is a national historic district located at Berkshire in Tioga County, New York. The district includes 17 properties with 25 contributing buildings, including 13 historic residences. The buildings date from about 1820 to 1932.

It was listed on the National Register of Historic Places in 1984.

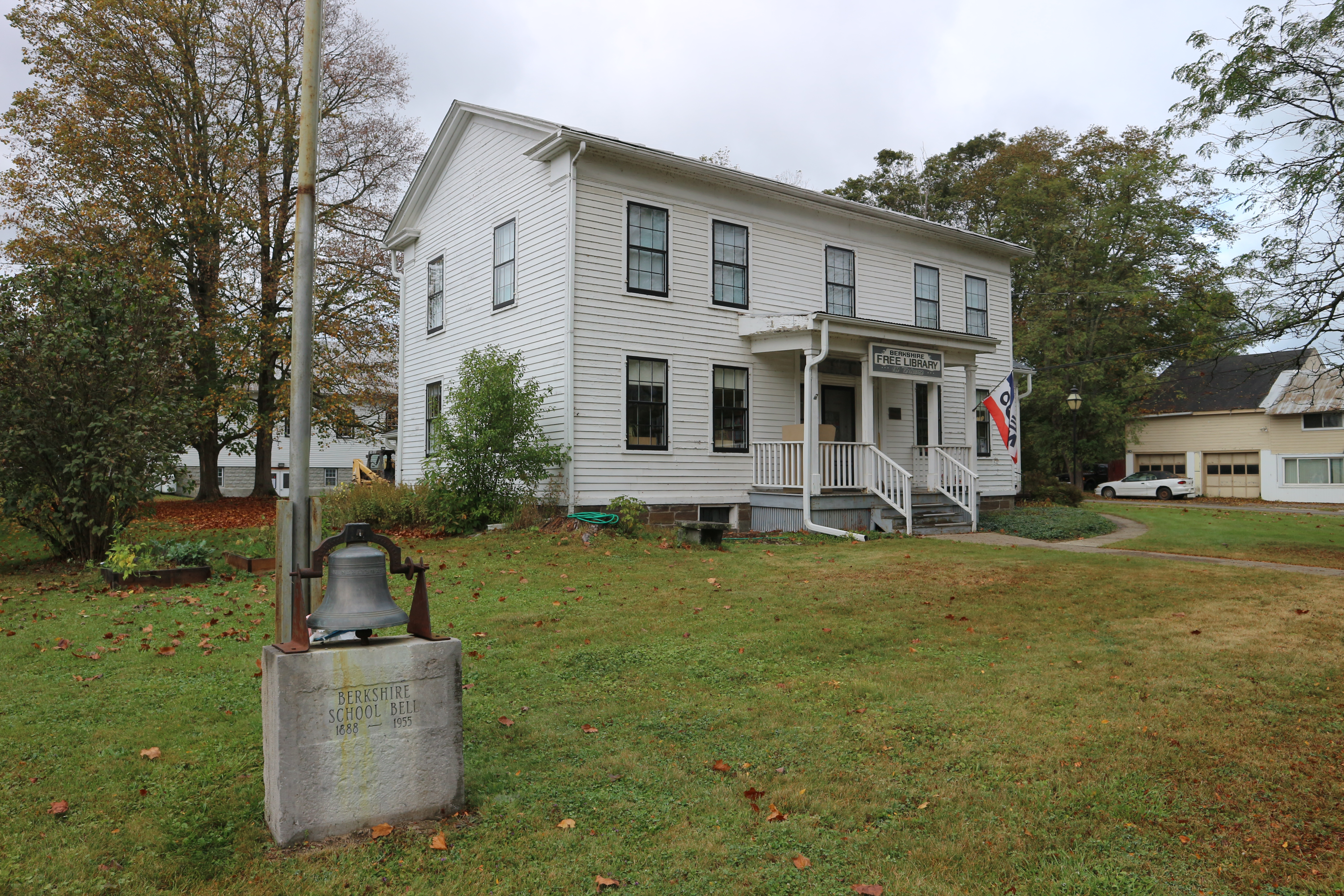
Library and Historic School Bell
