= East Berkshire United Methodist Church =

Historic church in New York, United States

- U.S. National Register of Historic Places
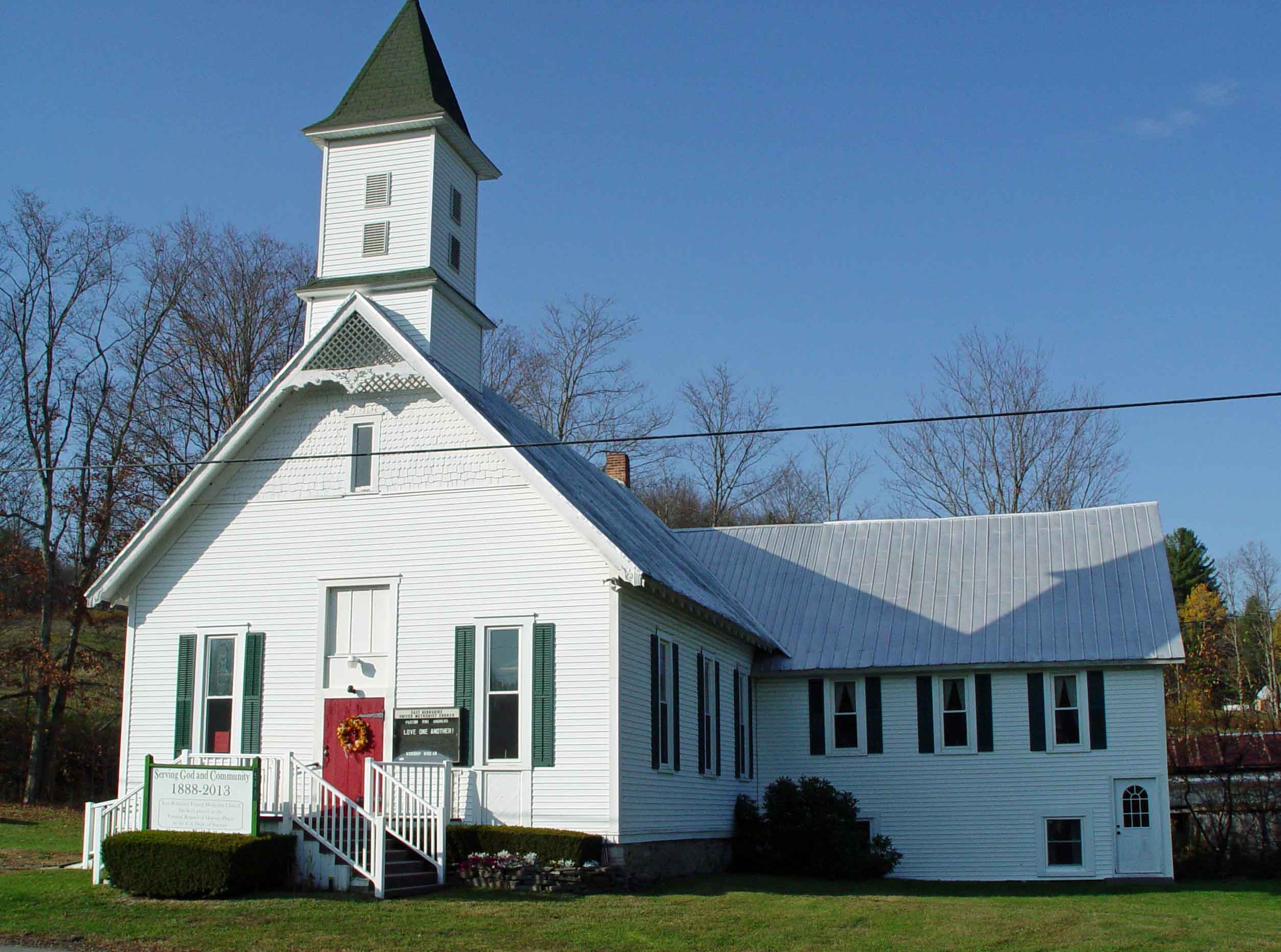

- Location within New York Location within the United States
- Location: E. Berkshire Rd., Berkshire, New York
- Coordinates: 42°18′24″N 76°8′42″W
- Area: less than one acre
- Built: 1888
- Architectural style: Late Victorian, Vernacular Victorian
- MPS: Berkshire MRA
- NRHP reference No.: 84003098
- Added to NRHP: July 02, 1984

East Berkshire United Methodist Church is a historic United Methodist church located at Berkshire in Tioga County, New York. It was built in 1888 and is a simple, one story frame building with a steep standing seam metal roof and clapboard siding. A small, square based louvered belfry is mounted directly above the gabled facade.

It was listed on the National Register of Historic Places in 1984.
