= Vesper Cliff =

Historic house in New York, United States

- U.S. National Register of Historic Places
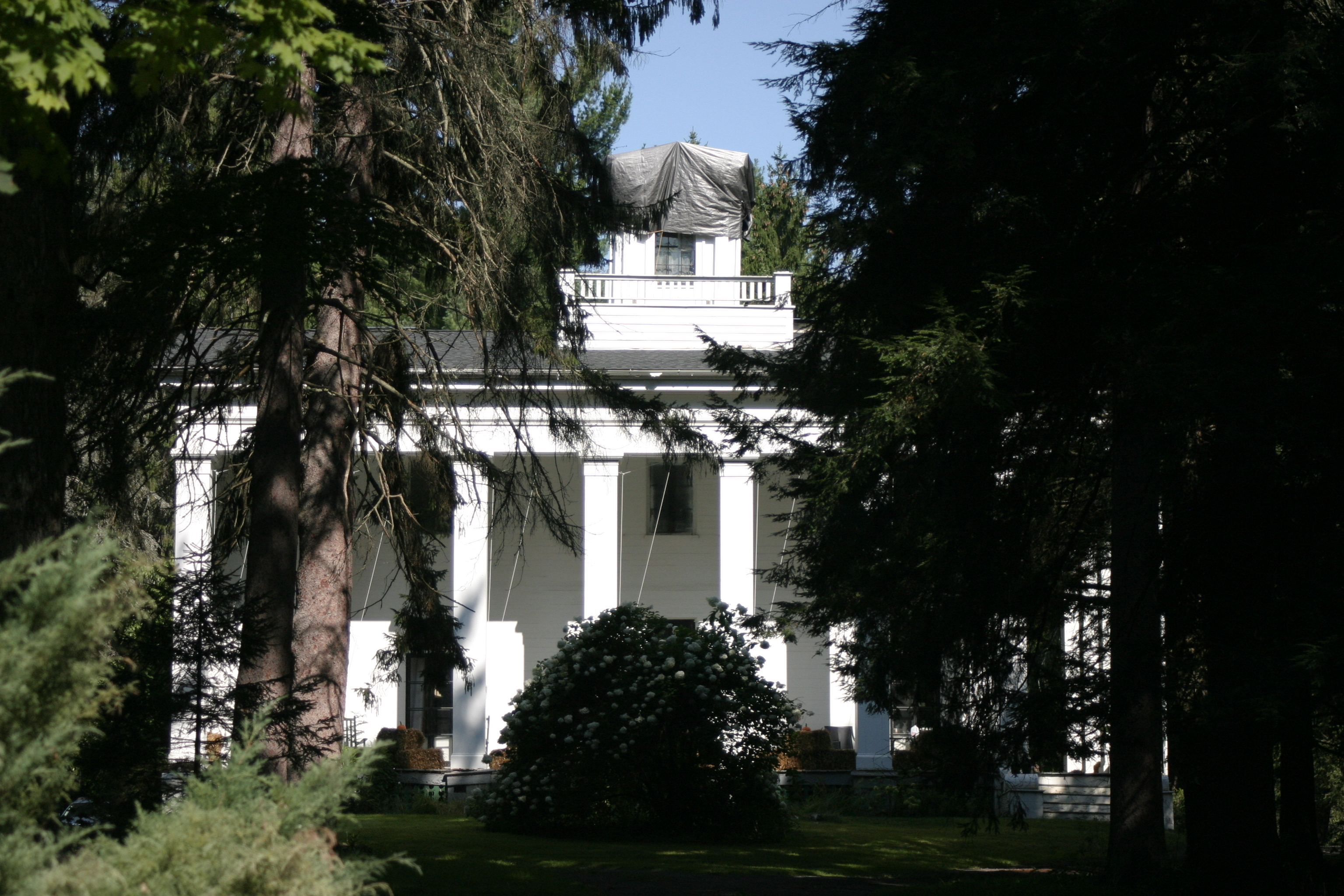

- Location within New York Location within the United States
- Nearest city: Owego, New York
- Coordinates: 42°5′54″N 76°16′45″W
- Area: 29 acres (12 ha)
- Built: 1791
- Architect: Alexander Jackson Davis
- Architectural style: Greek Revival
- NRHP reference No.: 05000746
- Added to NRHP: July 29, 2005

Vesper Cliff ( also known as Tioga Terrace, Glenbetsy, and Robert C. John House) an architecturally distinguished Greek Revival-style residence located immediately outside of the Town of Owego in Tioga County, New York. The oldest part of the house was built in 1791 with an addition of "plank" construction which was added in 1834, a monumental temple-fronted addition designed by architect Alexander Jackson Davis. Also on the property is an unusual barn with a distinctive neoclassical facade treatment (barn has since collapsed), as well as a chicken coop and ice house.

It was listed on the National Register of Historic Places in 2005.
