= Deodatus Royce House =

Historic house in New York, United States

- U.S. National Register of Historic Places
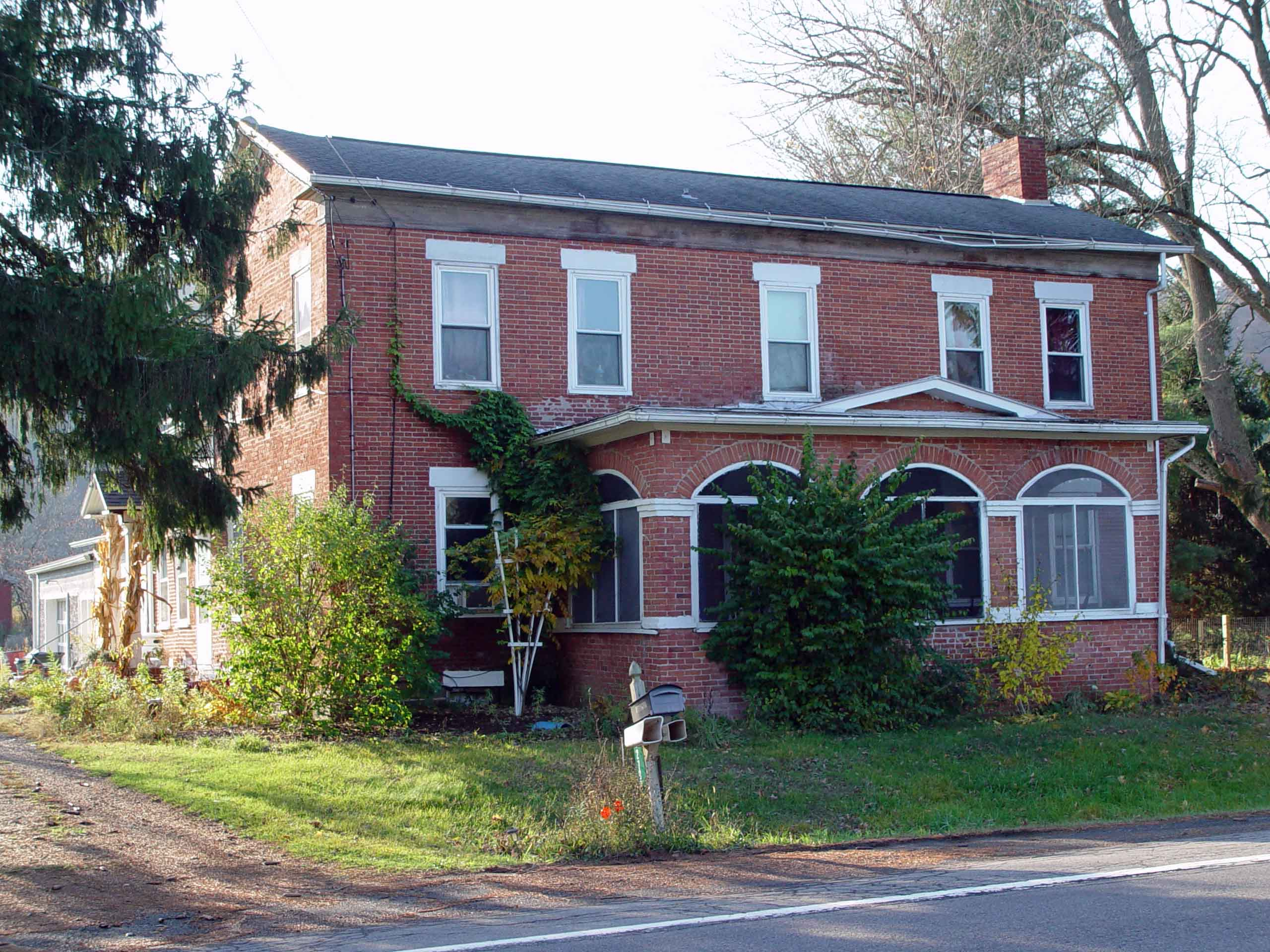

- Location within New York Location within the United States
- Location: NY 38, Berkshire, New York
- Coordinates: 42°19′26″N 76°11′2″W
- Area: 7 acres (2.8 ha)
- Built: 1830
- Architect: Royce, Deodatus
- Architectural style: Federal
- MPS: Berkshire MRA
- NRHP reference No.: 84003109
- Added to NRHP: July 02, 1984

Deodatus Royce House is a historic home located at Berkshire in Tioga County, New York. It is a two-story, five-bay, Federal style house built of brick about 1830. A single story ell extends from the rear.

It was listed on the National Register of Historic Places in 1984.
