= Tioga Centre General Store =

Historic commercial building in New York, United States

- U.S. National Register of Historic Places
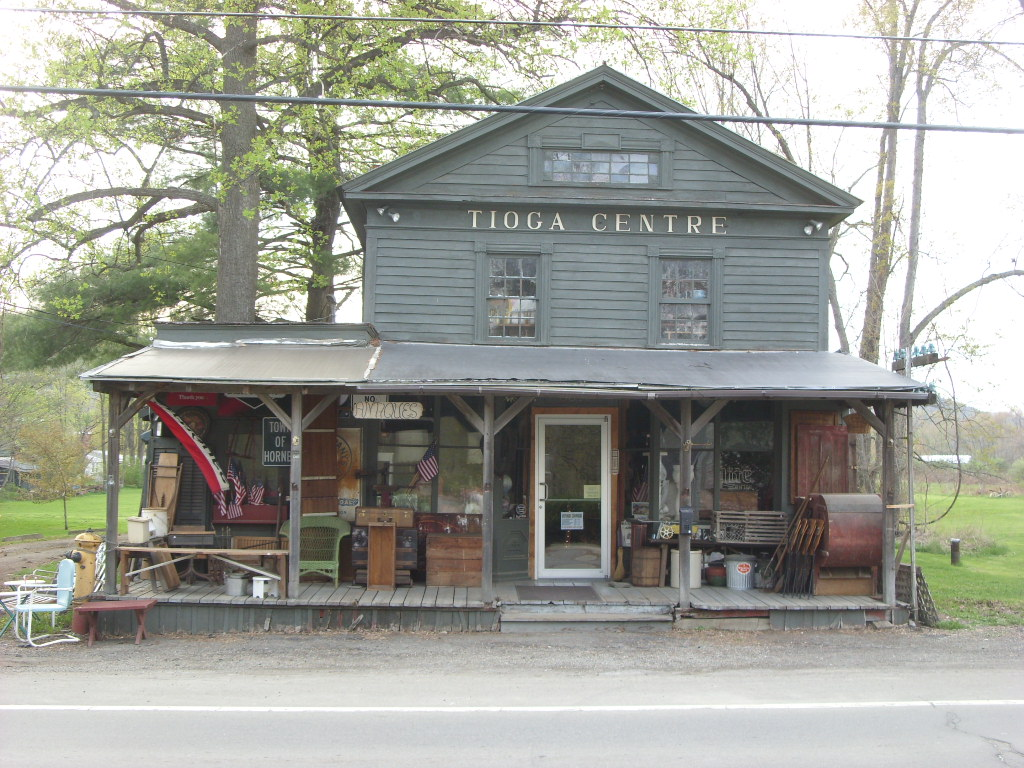
- Tioga Centre General Store, May 2009

- Location within New York Location within the United States
- Location: 3019 NY 17C, Tioga Center, New York
- Coordinates: 42°3′25″N 76°20′53″W
- Area: 1.6 acres (0.65 ha)
- Built: 1849
- Architect: Schoonover, E.H.
- Architectural style: Greek Revival
- NRHP reference No.: 02001709
- Added to NRHP: January 15, 2003

Tioga Centre General Store is a historic general store located at 3019 Rt 17 C Tioga Center in Tioga County, New York. It was built about 1849 and is a two-story, frame structure on an irregular coursed stone foundation. The building reflects the typical Greek Revival, front gabled style of commercial building popular in the mid-19th century.

It was listed on the National Register of Historic Places in 2003.

It is the oldest commercial building in Tioga County, New York. It is now occupied by an antique store, "Tioga Centre General Store Antiques and Collectibles". The store is operated by Fran Antalek.
