= Crest View Heights, New York =

- Census-designated place
- Location within New York Location within the United States
- Coordinates: 42°4′28″N 76°7′25″W
- Country: United States
- State: New York
- County: Tioga
- Town: Owego

Area
  - Total: 1.22 sq mi (3.17 km^{2})
  - Land: 1.22 sq mi (3.17 km^{2})
  - Water: 0.0039 sq mi (0.01 km^{2})
- Elevation: 1,015 ft (309 m)

Population (2020)
  - Total: 1,770
  - Density: 1,448.4/sq mi (559.24/km^{2})
- Time zone: UTC-5 (Eastern (EST))
  - Summer (DST): UTC-4 (EDT)
- ZIP Code: 13760 (Endicott)
- Area code: 607
- FIPS code: 36-18993
- GNIS feature ID: 2806977

Crest View Heights is a neighborhood and census-designated place (CDP) in the town of Owego, Tioga County, New York, United States. As of the 2020 census, Crest View Heights had a population of 1,770. It was first listed as a CDP prior to the 2020 census. Although not technically inside the Village of Endicott, it has an Endicott mailing address and zip code. The Crest View Heights Development was formed from the 1961-1974 purchase of the farms of J Ward Allen, Audley D Allen & Granville Brink by Kurt Franzenburg, John Garbar & Gerald A Cole, with VP Richard Huttleston, lawyered by Nathan Hankin & Francis C Palmer and built by Louis Tokos Sr Glenwood Building Supply. It contains the Thomas J Watson Elementary School of the Union-Edicott School District.

The community is in southeastern Tioga County, on the eastern side of Owego. It is bordered to the east by the town of Union in Broome County and to the south by the Southern Tier Line of the Norfolk Southern Railway. The CDP lies on a large hillside that rises to the north above the valley of the Susquehanna River.

New York Route 17C passes through the CDP, close to the southern border. Route 17C leads northeast 4 miles (6 km) to Endicott and 11 miles (18 km) to Binghamton, and northwest 10 miles (16 km) to the village of Owego.

== Demographics ==
Historical population
Census	Pop.	Note	%±
2020	1,770		—
U.S. Decennial Census

== Education ==
The CDP is in the Union-Endicott Central School District.
