= First Methodist Episcopal Church of Tioga Center =

Historic church in New York, United States

- U.S. National Register of Historic Places
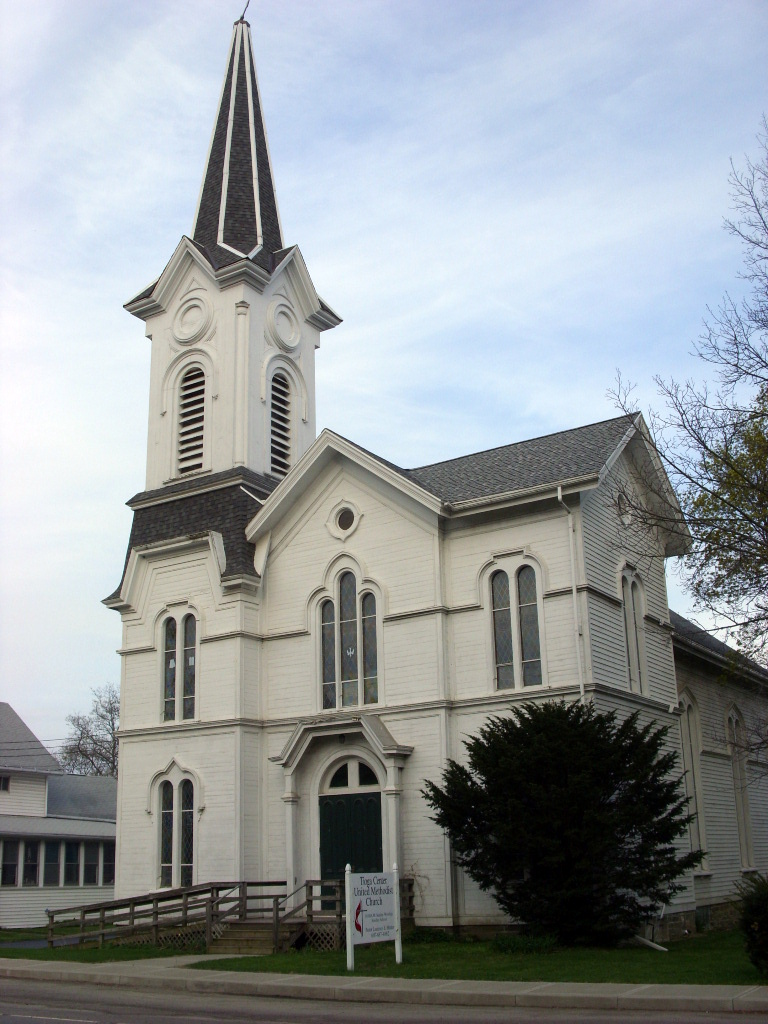
- First Methodist Episcopal Church of Tioga Center, May 2009

- Location within New York Location within the United States
- Interactive map showing the location for First Methodist Episcopal Church of Tioga Center
- Location: NY 17C, Tioga, New York
- Coordinates: 42°5′2″N 76°20′53″W
- Area: less than one acre
- Built: 1873
- Architectural style: Gothic
- NRHP reference No.: 02000304
- Added to NRHP: April 01, 2002

First Methodist Episcopal Church of Tioga Center, also known as United Methodist Church of Tioga Center, is a historic Methodist Episcopal church located at Tioga in Tioga County, New York. It is a vernacular Gothic Revival style rectangular structure built in 1872–1873. It is a two-story frame structure that features a tower with louvered belfry and spire in the northeast corner.

It was listed on the National Register of Historic Places in 2002.
