= First Congregational Church (Berkshire, New York) =

Historic church in New York, United States

- U.S. National Register of Historic Places
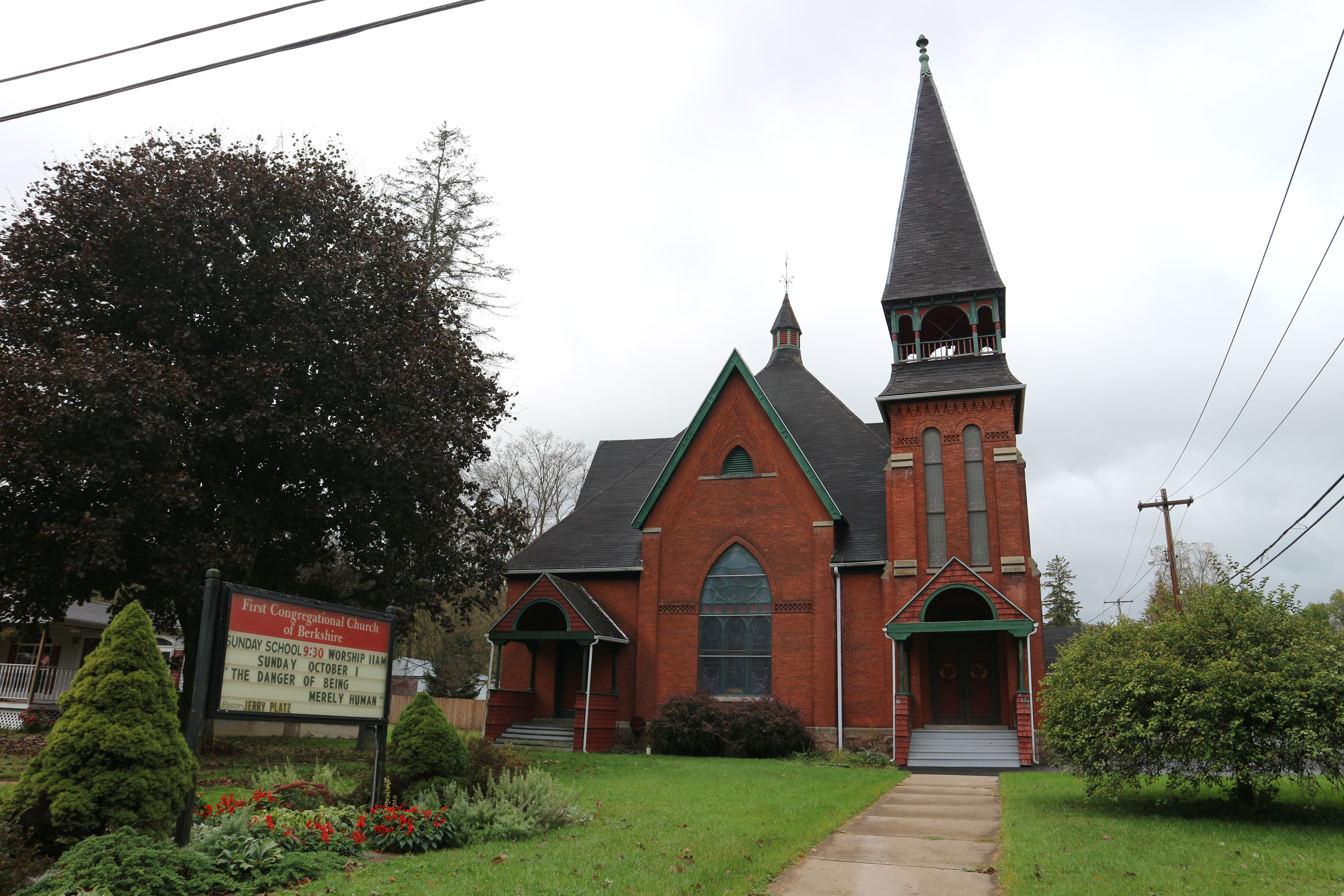

- Location within New York Location within the United States
- Location: 12445 State Route 38 (corner of Glen Rd. and Main St.), Berkshire, New York
- Coordinates: 42°18′6″N 76°11′18″W
- Area: less than one acre
- Built: 1889; 137 years ago
- Architect: Pierce & Dockstader
- Architectural style: Gothic Revival, Queen Anne
- MPS: Berkshire MRA
- NRHP reference No.: 84003101
- Added to NRHP: July 02, 1984

First Congregational Church is an evangelical, historic Congregational church located at Berkshire in Tioga County, New York. The first "Berkshire" Congregational Church was founded in 1803, and continues now in Newark Valley. The whole area now comprising Richford, Berkshire and Newark Valley had comprised only one town, Berkshire, originally. The present-day Berkshire Congregational Church was established in 1833, as a natural outgrowth of the one in Newark Valley.

The church is affiliated with the Conservative Congregational Christian Conference (CCCC), the Greater Hudson Valley Fellowship of the CCCC, and is "in fellowship with all churches which acknowledge Jesus as Christ to be their divine Redeemer and Lord". The church's stated purpose is "to fulfill the Great Commission of Christ (Matthew 28.18-20) locally and globally, drawing non-Christians and the unchurched to personal faith in Jesus Christ as Savior and Lord, to encourage and edify Christians to become obedient followers of Christ and well-equipped ministers for Him, and to exalt and worship God in all things."

The church building is a Victorian Gothic / Queen Anne style, generally square-shaped structure completed in 1889 from designs by architects Pierce & Dockstader. It is built of brick over a random ashlar rock faced foundation. It features a tall bell tower and asymmetrically gabled roofline. The interior layout is based upon the Akron plan.

It was listed on the National Register of Historic Places in 1984.

In June 2012, the church hired Jerry Platz as its new pastor.

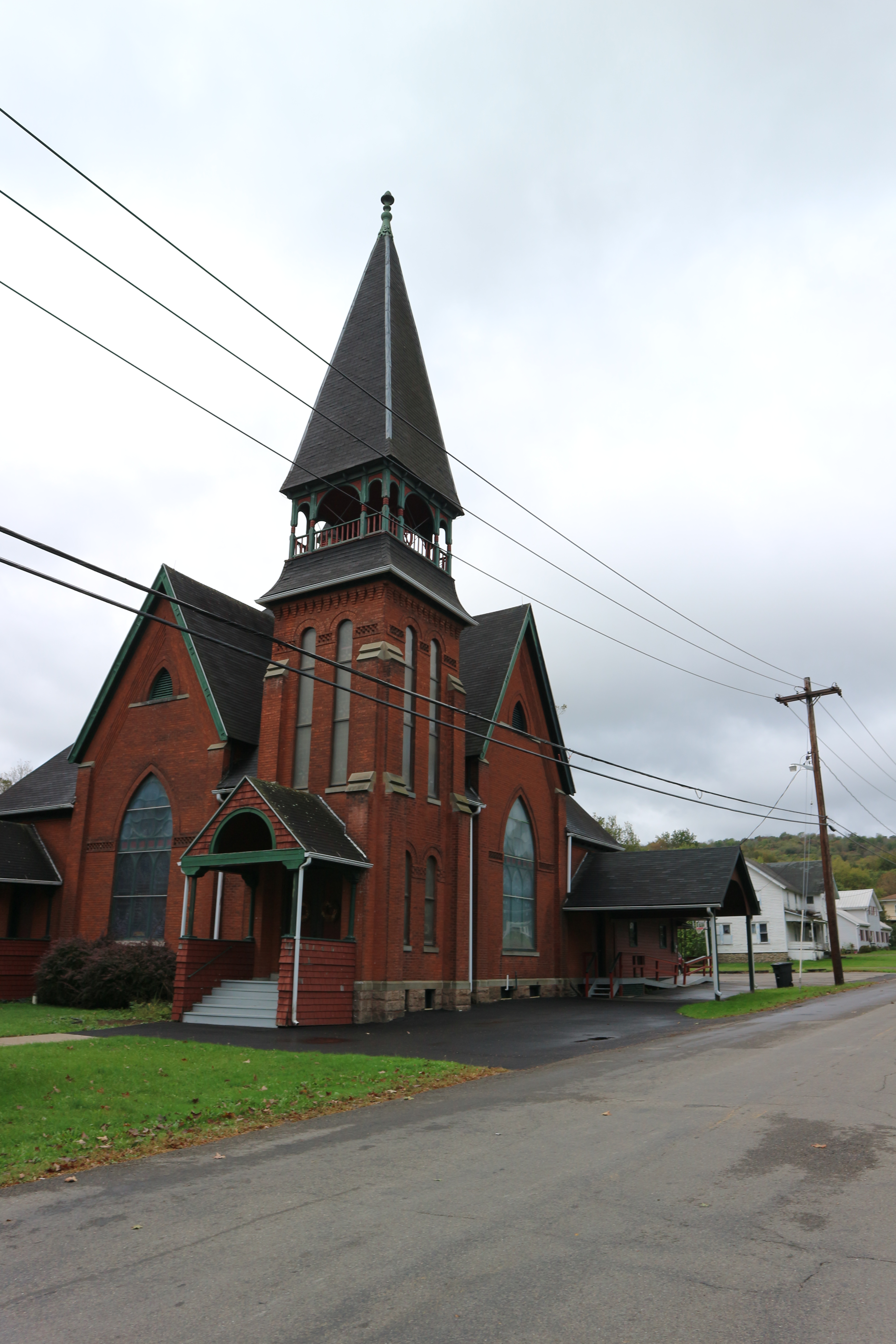
