= Tioga, New York =

Tioga
- Town
- Location within the state of New York
- Coordinates: 42°5′26″N 76°21′51″W
- Country: United States
- State: New York
- County: Tioga

Area
  - Total: 59.46 sq mi (154.00 km^{2})
  - Land: 58.63 sq mi (151.85 km^{2})
  - Water: 0.83 sq mi (2.15 km^{2})
- Elevation: 1,129 ft (344 m)

Population (2020)
  - Total: 4,455 ▼
  - Estimate (2021): 4,404
  - Density: 80.1/sq mi (30.91/km^{2})
- Time zone: UTC-5 (Eastern (EST))
  - Summer (DST): UTC-4 (EDT)
- ZIP code: 13845
- Area code: 607
- FIPS code: 36-73968
- GNIS feature ID: 0979548
- Website: https://townoftiogany.gov/

Tioga is a town in Tioga County, New York, United States. The population was 4,455 at the 2020 census. The town is in the southwestern part of the county and lies between Elmira and Binghamton. Tioga is situated in the Southern Tier District of New York.

== History ==
For thousands of years, this area of New York had been settled by distinct cultures of indigenous peoples. The most recent prehistoric peoples were the Owasco, who appeared to migrate from southern areas and displaced the Point Peninsula complex peoples. However, a 2011 paper by archaeologist Dr. John P. Hart argues there was no definable Owasco culture. They lived in isolated villages and had frequent warfare. Under pressure of warfare, they began to consolidate into larger tribes and confederacies.

The historic Iroquoian-speaking tribes developed as the Five Nations of the Haudenosaunee or the Iroquois Confederacy, since about the 15th century. Of these, the Mohawk Nation has reservations in northern New York, along the St. Lawrence River and in the Canadian provinces of Quebec and Ontario; the Oneida Nation has a small reservation in central New York and larger one near Green Bay, Wisconsin; the Onondaga Nation remains on its traditional territory on a reservation in central New York, while the Seneca Nation and Tuscarora Nation have reservations in western New York.

The Sullivan Expedition of 1779 during the American Revolutionary War passed through the area, destroying Seneca villages, as the Seneca and three other Iroquois nations sided with the British. Loyalist and allied Iroquois tribes had been raiding colonial settlements in the Mohawk Valley and related areas.

After the American Revolutionary War, those Iroquois nations who had sided with the British were forced to cede their lands to New York, although their treaties were not ratified by the US Congress. The first European-American settlers arrived around 1792.

Organized in 1788 before Tioga County was established, as part of the "Old Town of Chemung," the town was renamed "Owego" in 1791. That was the year Tioga County was created. In 1818 the town was renamed the "Town of Tioga" by switching names with the current Town of Owego. The Village of Owego was thus in the town of the same name.

The First Methodist Episcopal Church of Tioga Center was listed on the National Register of Historic Places in 2002.

== Geography ==
According to the United States Census Bureau, the town has a total area of 59.5 square miles (154 km^{2}), of which 58.7 square miles (152 km^{2}) is land and 0.8 square miles (2.1 km^{2}) (1.31%) is water.

The Susquehanna River forms the southern town boundary. New York State Route 17C follows the course of the Susquehanna on its north bank.

== Demographics ==
Historical population
Census	Pop.	Note	%±
1820	1,816		—
1830	1,411		−22.3%
1840	2,464		74.6%
1850	2,839		15.2%
1860	3,202		12.8%
1870	3,272		2.2%
1880	3,102		−5.2%
1890	2,455		−20.9%
1900	2,113		−13.9%
1910	1,940		−8.2%
1920	1,677		−13.6%
1930	1,587		−5.4%
1940	1,782		12.3%
1950	2,000		12.2%
1960	2,814		40.7%
1970	3,621		28.7%
1980	4,432		22.4%
1990	4,772		7.7%
2000	4,840		1.4%
2010	4,871		0.6%
2020	4,455		−8.5%
2021 (est.)	4,404		−1.1%
U.S. Decennial Census

As of the census of 2000, there were 4,840 people, 1,849 households, and 1,362 families residing in the town. The population density was 82.5 inhabitants per square mile (31.9/km^{2}). There were 2,041 housing units at an average density of 34.8 per square mile (13.4/km^{2}). The racial makeup of the town was 97.95% White, 0.14% African American, 0.19% Native American, 0.31% Asian, 0.02% Pacific Islander, 0.29% from other races, and 1.10% from two or more races. Hispanic or Latino of any race were 0.79% of the population.

There were 1,849 households, out of which 34.7% had children under the age of 18 living with them, 58.8% were married couples living together, 10.6% had a female householder with no husband present, and 26.3% were non-families. 20.8% of all households were made up of individuals, and 9.1% had someone living alone who was 65 years of age or older. The average household size was 2.62 and the average family size was 3.01.

In the town, the population was spread out, with 27.5% under the age of 18, 7.5% from 18 to 24, 29.0% from 25 to 44, 23.0% from 45 to 64, and 13.0% who were 65 years of age or older. The median age was 37 years. For every 100 females, there were 97.6 males. For every 100 females age 18 and over, there were 93.0 males.

The median income for a household in the town was $36,960, and the median income for a family was $46,650. Males had a median income of $27,169 versus $21,170 for females. The per capita income for the town was $17,813. About 3.5% of families and 6.5% of the population were below the poverty line, including 6.3% of those under age 18 and 3.2% of those age 65 or over.

== Communities and locations in the Town of Tioga ==
- Catlin Hill – A hamlet in the southeastern part of the town.
- Germany Hill – A hamlet near the northern town line.
- Goodrich – A hamlet in the southeastern corner of the town on County Road 23, near the Village of Owego and the confluence of the Owego Creek and the Susquehanna River.
- Halsey Valley – A hamlet on the western town line, partly in Barton. It was founded circa 1825.
- Horton Crossing – A hamlet on NY-17C, east of Tioga Center.
- Owego Creek – A stream that forms part of the eastern town boundary.
- Smithboro – A hamlet west of Tioga Center and near the Susquehanna River on NY-17C.
- Straits Corners – A hamlet by the northern town line.
- Tioga Center – A hamlet in the southeastern part of the town on NY-17C, near the Susquehanna River. The Tioga Centre General Store was listed on the National Register of Historic Places in 2003.
