= Berkshire, New York =

- Town
- Location within the state of New York
- Coordinates: 42°18′14″N 76°11′07″W
- Country: United States
- State: New York
- County: Tioga
- Town: 1808

Government
  - Type: Town Board
  - Supervisor: Keith Flesher

Area
  - Total: 30.22 sq mi (78.28 km^{2})
  - Land: 30.22 sq mi (78.26 km^{2})
  - Water: 0.0077 sq mi (0.02 km^{2})
- Elevation: 1,033 ft (315 m)

Population (2020)
  - Total: 1,485 ▲
  - Estimate (2016): 1,474
  - Density: 44.6/sq mi (17.21/km^{2})
- Time zone: UTC-5 (Eastern (EST))
  - Summer (DST): UTC-4 (EDT)
- ZIP code: 13736
- Area code: 607
- FIPS code: 36-06145
- GNIS feature ID: 0978726
- Website: http://www.berkshireny.net/town-government.html

Berkshire is a town in Tioga County, New York, United States. As of the 2020 census, it had a population of 1,485. The town is named after Berkshire County, Massachusetts.

The Town of Berkshire is in the northeastern part of the county and is northwest of Binghamton and southeast of Ithaca.

== History ==
Purchase rights to the Native American lands in the area were awarded to the Commonwealth of Massachusetts as part of the Boston Ten Townships, by the Treaty of Hartford in 1786. (New York retained the right to govern the land.) Massachusetts sold these rights to private individuals in 1788.

The first settlers arrived around 1791. It was originally called "Browns Settlement."

The Town of Berkshire was established in 1808 from the Town of Union while in Broome County. In 1822, Berkshire was made part of Tioga County. The Town of Newark Valley, as the "Town of Westfield," was created from part of Berkshire in 1828. An additional part of Berkshire was lost in 1831, to found the Town of Richford, then called "Arlington."

Within the confines of Berkshire, the Lyman P. Akins House, Levi Ball House, Belcher Family Homestead and Farm, Deodatus Royce House, the J. Ball House, and the J. B. Royce House and Farm Complex, are listed on the National Register of Historic Places.

== Geography ==
According to the United States Census Bureau, the town has a total area of 30.2 square miles (78 km^{2}), of which 30.2 square miles (78 km^{2}) is land and 0.03% is water.

The eastern town line of Berkshire is the border of Broome County, and part of the western town line is the border of Tompkins County.

New York State Route 38 is a north–south highway in the town.

== Demographics ==
Historical population
Census	Pop.	Note	%±
1820	1,502		—
1830	1,683		12.1%
1840	956		−43.2%
1850	1,049		9.7%
1860	1,151		9.7%
1870	1,240		7.7%
1880	1,304		5.2%
1890	1,160		−11.0%
1900	1,011		−12.8%
1910	846		−16.3%
1920	805		−4.8%
1930	771		−4.2%
1940	861		11.7%
1950	912		5.9%
1960	953		4.5%
1970	1,098		15.2%
1980	1,335		21.6%
1990	1,303		−2.4%
2000	1,366		4.8%
2010	1,412		3.4%
2020	1,485		5.2%
2021 (est.)	1,474		−0.7%
U.S. Decennial Census

As of the 2000 census, there were 1,366 people, 506 households, and 384 families in the town. The population density was 45.2 inhabitants per square mile (17.5/km^{2}). There were 561 housing units at an average density of 18.6 per square mile (7.2/km^{2}). The racial makeup of the town was 98.76% White, 0.37% African American, 0.44% Native American, 0.07% Asian, and 0.37% from two or more races. Hispanic or Latino of any race were 0.37% of the population.

There were 506 households, out of which 30.2% had children under the age of 18 living with them, 61.5% were married couples living together, 7.9% had a female householder with no husband present, and 24.1% were non-families. 19.4% of all households were made up of individuals, and 7.5% had someone living alone who was 65 years of age or older. The average household size was 2.70 and the average family size was 3.07.

In the town, the population was spread out, with 25.1% under the age of 18, 9.2% from 18 to 24, 26.4% from 25 to 44, 28.4% from 45 to 64, and 10.8% who were 65 years of age or older. The median age was 38 years. For every 100 females, there were 103.6 males. For every 100 females age 18 and over, there were 104.2 males.

The median income for a household in the town was $37,625, and the median income for a family was $43,676. Males had a median income of $29,620 versus $22,865 for females. The per capita income for the town was $16,735. About 6.5% of families and 11.4% of the population were below the poverty line, including 16.7% of those under age 18 and 7.0% of those age 65 or over.

== Communities and locations in the Town of Berkshire ==
- Berkshire – The hamlet of Berkshire is located where County Roads 8, 10, and NY-38 converge. The community is in the center of the town and was first settled circa 1795. The Robert Akins House, J. Ball House, Stephen Ball House, Calvin A. Buffington House, First Congregational Church, Lebbeus Ford House, Nathaniel Bishop Collins House, and Berkshire Village Historic District are listed on the National Register of Historic Places.
- East Berkshire – A hamlet east of Berkshire village on County Road 10. The East Berkshire United Methodist Church was listed on the National Register of Historic Places in 1984.
- Wilson Creek – A hamlet in the southeastern part of the town, named after a nearby stream.
