= Owego, New York =

Town in Tioga County, New York, US

- Town
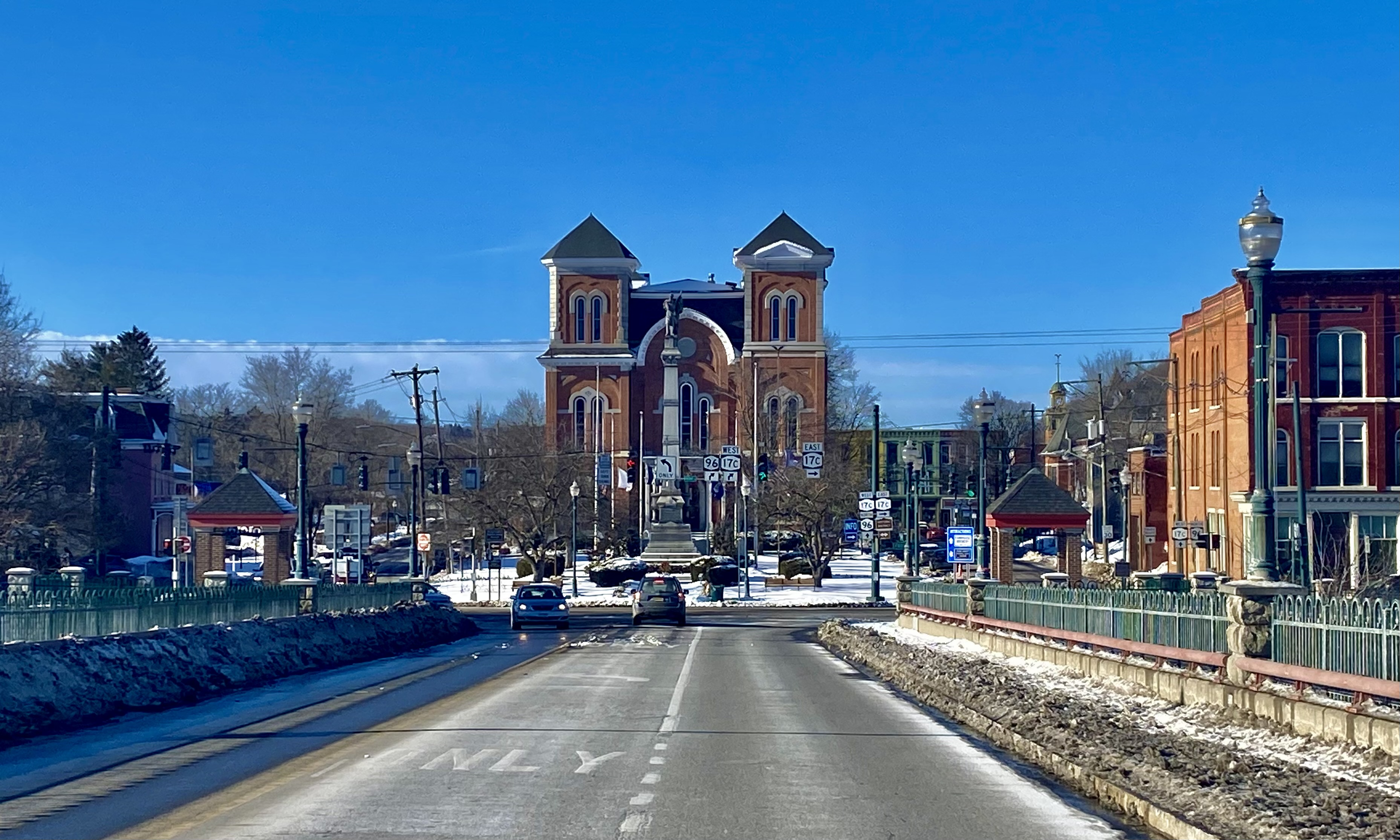
- Courthouse Square, Owego

- Location within the state of New York Owego (the United States)
- Coordinates: 42°6′16″N 76°15′48″W
- Country: United States
- State: New York
- County: Tioga
- Established: 1791

Government
  - Town Supervisor: Gary Hellmers

Area
  - Total: 105.74 sq mi (273.87 km^{2})
  - Land: 104.22 sq mi (269.93 km^{2})
  - Water: 1.52 sq mi (3.94 km^{2}) 1.51%

Population (2020)
  - Total: 18,728 ▼
  - Estimate (2021): 18,633
  - Density: 181.8/sq mi (70.19/km^{2})
- Time zone: UTC−5 (EST)
  - Summer (DST): UTC−4 (EDT)
- FIPS code: 36-107-55893
- Website: www.townofowego.com

Owego is a town in Tioga County, New York, United States. The population was 18,728 at the 2020 census. The name is derived from the Iroquoian word Ahwaga, meaning "where the valley widens".

Owego is in the southeastern corner of the county, west of Binghamton. The village of Owego is in the western part of the town.

== History ==
The town was first settled around 1786. The original town of Owego was created at the time Tioga County was formed in 1791. This original town was reduced by formation of later towns in the county. The town's name is a derivative of the Iroquoian word "ahwaga", which means "where the valley widens". This name came from the vast floods that run into the valley when the winter snows melt, which caused several deaths a year.

The current town of Owego was formed as the town of Tioga in 1800 from the town of Union (now in Broome County).

Confusion over the location of the village of Owego caused the legislature to have the towns of Owego and Tioga switch names in 1813 so that Owego village was within the same-named town.

The Hiawatha Farm, Waits Methodist Episcopal Church and Cemetery, and Vesper Cliff are listed on the National Register of Historic Places.

=== Flood of 2011 ===
On September 8, 2011, the town of Owego was badly damaged by flood waters. Remnants of Tropical Storm Lee dumped massive amounts of rain over the region, causing the Susquehanna River to rapidly overflow its banks.

== Geography ==
According to the United States Census Bureau, the town has a total area of 105.8 square miles (273.9 km^{2}), of which 104.2 square miles (269.8 km^{2}) is land and 1.6 square miles (4.1 km^{2}) (1.51%) is water.

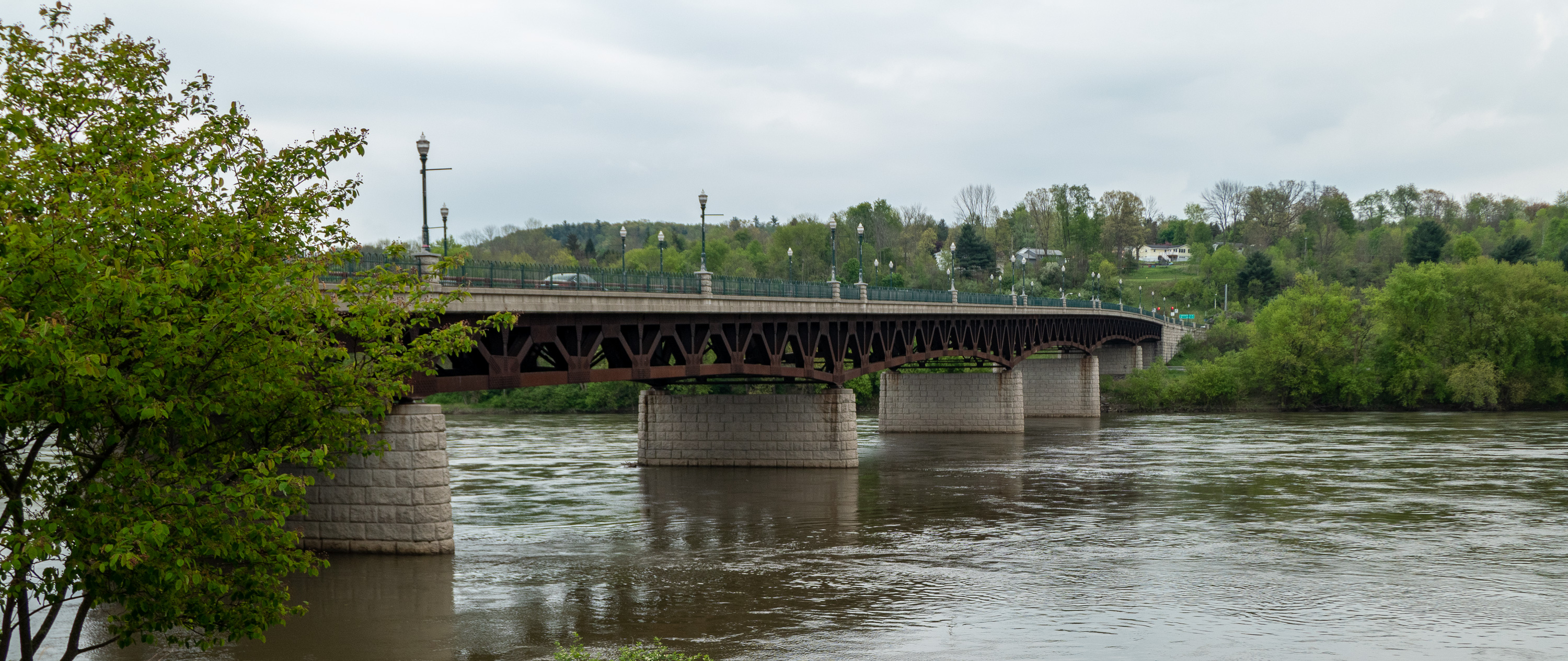
The Court Street Bridge crosses the Susquehanna

The Susquehanna River flows across the town, dividing it into two parts. Owego Creek flows into the Susquehanna at Owego village and marks the western town line.

=== Transportation ===
The Southern Tier Expressway (New York State Route 17) crosses the town on the river's south bank. New York State Route 17C follows the river along the north bank. New York State Route 38 and New York State Route 96 converge north of Owego village.

Until the 1960s, the Erie Lackawanna Railroad operated passenger trains through Owego, for trips from Buffalo to Hoboken, New Jersey: the Phoebe Snow, ending in 1966; the overnight New York Mail/ Owl, ending in 1967; and the Lake Cities between Chicago and Hoboken, which was the last EL passenger train through Owego on January 6, 1970.

=== Adjacent towns and areas ===
The eastern town line is the border of Broome County and the southern town boundary is the border of Pennsylvania (Bradford and Susquehanna counties). Owego is in the Southern Tier of New York.

== Demographics ==
Historical population
Census	Pop.	Note	%±
1820	1,741		—
1830	3,080		76.9%
1840	5,340		73.4%
1850	7,159		34.1%
1860	8,935		24.8%
1870	9,442		5.7%
1880	9,884		4.7%
1890	9,008		−8.9%
1900	8,378		−7.0%
1910	7,474		−10.8%
1920	6,707		−10.3%
1930	7,804		16.4%
1940	8,717		11.7%
1950	9,941		14.0%
1960	14,710		48.0%
1970	20,336		38.2%
1980	20,471		0.7%
1990	21,279		3.9%
2000	20,365		−4.3%
2010	19,883		−2.4%
2020	18,728		−5.8%
2021 (est.)	18,633	▼	−0.5%
U.S. Decennial Census

As of the census of 2000, there were 20,365 people, 7,733 households, and 5,761 families residing in the town. The population density was 195.5 inhabitants per square mile (75.5/km^{2}). There were 8,226 housing units at an average density of 79.0 per square mile (30.5/km^{2}). The racial makeup of the town was 96.78% White, 0.70% Black or African American, 0.22% Native American, 1.01% Asian, 0.02% Pacific Islander, 0.26% from other races, and 1.02% from two or more races. Hispanic or Latino of any race were 1.11% of the population.

There were 7,733 households, out of which 34.6% had children under the age of 18 living with them, 63.0% were married couples living together, 8.5% had a female householder with no husband present, and 25.5% were non-families. 21.4% of all households were made up of individuals, and 8.5% had someone living alone who was 65 years of age or older. The average household size was 2.61 and the average family size was 3.03.

In the town, the population was spread out, with 26.5% under the age of 18, 6.5% from 18 to 24, 28.4% from 25 to 44, 25.5% from 45 to 64, and 13.1% who were 65 years of age or older. The median age was 39 years. For every 100 females, there were 99.3 males. For every 100 females age 18 and over, there were 95.4 males.

The median income for a household in the town was $46,987, and the median income for a family was $53,735. Males had a median income of $40,677 versus $25,425 for females. The per capita income for the town was $21,996. About 5.0% of families and 6.6% of the population were below the poverty line, including 7.5% of those under age 18 and 3.9% of those age 65 or over.

As of the 2025 Census American Community Survey, the median income for a household in the town was $86,263. The median per capita income was $48,452.

== Communities and locations in the Town of Owego ==
- Apalachin – The hamlet of Apalachin is south of the Susquehanna River by the Southern Tier Expressway.
- Campville – A hamlet on the northern side of the river on NY-17C. It was originally called East Owego until renamed after soldier and settler Asa Camp.
- Crest View Heights – A neighborhood and census-designated place near the eastern town line, north of the river.
- Flemingville – A hamlet north of Owego village on NY Route 38. It was named after soldier and settler David Fleming.
- Foster – A location near the eastern town boundary, named after early settlers named Foster.
- Gaskill Corners (or Gaskill) – A hamlet north of the river on County Road 39. It is named after early settler Joseph Gaskill.
- Gibsons Corners – A hamlet south of the river near the western town line. It is named after Eli Gibson, an early settler.
- Hiawatha Island – An island in the Susquehanna River east of Owego village and west of Apalachin.
- Hullsville – A location north of Gaskill on County Road 39.
- Oakley Corners – A location in the northeastern section of the town, near Hullsville.
- Owego – The village of Owego is located on the north bank of the Susquehanna River by Owego Creek and the west town line.
- Owego Creek – A stream that flows southward through the western side of the town and is joined by the Catatonk Creek before it enters the Susquehanna River.
- South Apalachin – A location in the southeastern part of the town on County Road 41.
- South Owego – A hamlet near the southern town line on County Road 27.
- Tioga Terrace – A neighborhood and census-designated place east of Apalachin and south of NY-434.
- Waits – A hamlet in the southwestern corner of the town, named after early settler Henry Waits.
- Whittemore – A location by the eastern town line, named after early settlers named Foster. A descendant, Reverend Whittemore, preached at the Whittemore Hill church until sometime around the 1980s.
