= Tioga County, New York =

County in New York, United States

- County
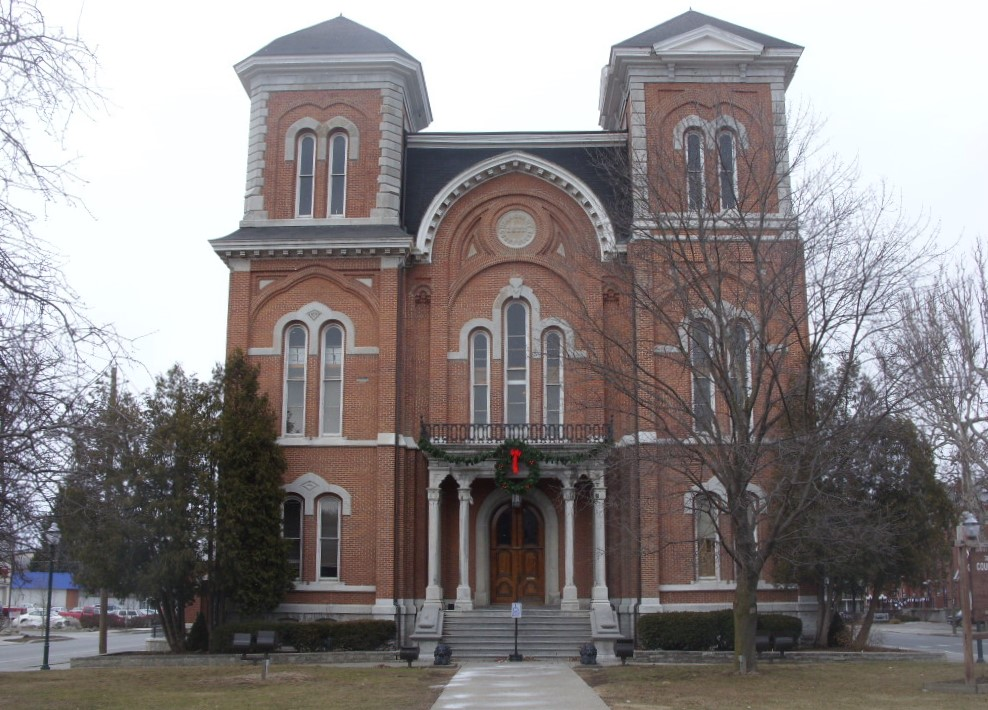
- Tioga County Courthouse

- Flag Seal

- Location within the U.S. state of New York
- Coordinates: 42.17°N 76.30°W
- Country: United States
- State: New York
- Founded: 1791
- Seat: Owego
- Largest village: Waverly

Area
  - Total: 523 sq mi (1,350 km^{2})
  - Land: 519 sq mi (1,340 km^{2})
  - Water: 4.3 sq mi (11 km^{2}) 0.8%

Population (2020)
  - Total: 48,455
  - Estimate (2025): 47,453 ▼
  - Density: 93.4/sq mi (36.1/km^{2})
- Time zone: UTC−5 (Eastern)
  - Summer (DST): UTC−4 (EDT)
- Congressional district: 23rd
- Website: tiogacountyny.com

Tioga County /taɪˈoʊɡə/ is a county in the U.S. state of New York. As of the 2020 census, the population was 48,455. Its county seat is Owego. Tioga County is part of the Binghamton metropolitan area. The county is part of the Southern Tier region of the state.

The county's name is a corruption of Iroquois De-yoh-ho-gah, meaning "at the forks" or "where it forks."

== History ==
In 1789, as the number of residents increased in the region, Montgomery County was reduced in size by the founding of Ontario County from some of its territory. The area taken from Montgomery County at that time was much larger than the present Ontario County, also including present-day Allegany, Cattaraugus, Chautauqua, Erie, Genesee, Livingston, Monroe, Niagara, Orleans, Steuben, Wyoming, Yates, and part of Schuyler and Wayne counties.

In 1791, Tioga County was founded by another division of territory from Montgomery County. At the time of its foundation, Tioga County included present-day Broome and Chemung counties and parts of Chenango and Schuyler counties.

Tioga County was reduced in size in 1798 by the splitting-off of Chemung County (which also included part of the present Schuyler County and by the combination of a portion with a portion of Herkimer County to create Chenango County. In 1806, it was further reduced by the splitting-off of Broome County.

== Geography ==
According to the U.S. Census Bureau, the county has a total area of 523 square miles (1,350 km^{2}), 519 square miles (1,340 km^{2}) of which is land and 4.3 square miles (11 km^{2}) (0.8%) of which is water.

Tioga County is in southwest New York State, west of Binghamton and directly north of the border with Pennsylvania. The Susquehanna River flows into Pennsylvania from this county. The county is considered part of the Southern Tier region of New York State.

The highest elevation is an unnamed 1,994-foot (608 m) hill in the county's northern corner. The lowest is 720 feet (220 m) on the state line where the Susquehanna flows into Pennsylvania.

=== Adjacent counties ===
- Cortland County - northeast
- Broome County - east
- Susquehanna County, Pennsylvania - southeast
- Bradford County, Pennsylvania - south
- Chemung County - west
- Tompkins County - northwest

=== Major highways ===
- I-86 / NY 17 / Southern Tier Expressway
- US 220
- New York State Route 17C
- New York State Route 38
- New York State Route 96
- New York State Route 96B

== Demographics ==
Historical population
Census	Pop.	Note	%±
1800	7,109		—
1810	7,899		11.1%
1820	16,971		114.8%
1830	27,690		63.2%
1840	20,527		−25.9%
1850	24,880		21.2%
1860	28,748		15.5%
1870	30,572		6.3%
1880	32,673		6.9%
1890	29,935		−8.4%
1900	27,951		−6.6%
1910	25,624		−8.3%
1920	24,212		−5.5%
1930	25,480		5.2%
1940	27,072		6.2%
1950	30,166		11.4%
1960	37,802		25.3%
1970	46,513		23.0%
1980	49,812		7.1%
1990	52,337		5.1%
2000	51,784		−1.1%
2010	51,125		−1.3%
2020	48,455		−5.2%
2025 (est.)	47,453	▼	−2.1%
U.S. Decennial Census; 1790–1960 1900–1990; 1990–2000 2010–2020

=== 2020 census ===
Tioga County, New York – Racial and ethnic composition Note: the US Census treats Hispanic/Latino as an ethnic category. This table excludes Latinos from the racial categories and assigns them to a separate category. Hispanics/Latinos may be of any race.
Race / Ethnicity (NH = Non-Hispanic)	Pop 1980	Pop 1990	Pop 2000	Pop 2010	Pop 2020	% 1980	% 1990	% 2000	% 2010	% 2020
White alone (NH)	48,997	51,256	50,180	49,105	44,195	98.36%	97.93%	96.90%	96.05%	91.21%
Black or African American alone (NH)	277	298	270	349	434	0.56%	0.57%	0.52%	0.68%	0.90%
Native American or Alaska Native alone (NH)	60	91	93	73	62	0.12%	0.17%	0.18%	0.14%	0.13%
Asian alone (NH)	204	305	295	371	370	0.41%	0.58%	0.57%	0.73%	0.76%
Native Hawaiian or Pacific Islander alone (NH)	x	x	7	12	12	x	x	0.01%	0.02%	0.02%
Other race alone (NH)	10	20	31	26	158	0.02%	0.04%	0.06%	0.05%	0.33%
Mixed race or Multiracial (NH)	x	x	399	495	2,107	x	x	0.77%	0.97%	4.35%
Hispanic or Latino (any race)	264	367	509	694	1,117	0.53%	0.70%	0.98%	1.36%	2.31%
Total	49,812	52,337	51,784	51,125	48,455	100.00%	100.00%	100.00%	100.00%	100.00%

As of the 2020 census, the median household income was $62,400. In the 2024 American Community Survey, the median income was $72,739.

=== 2010 ===
As of the census of 2010, there were 51,125 people living in the county, with 22,203 housing units, of these 20,350 (91.3%) occupied, 1,853 (8.3%) vacant. The population density was 98 inhabitants per square mile (38/km^{2}). The racial makeup of the county was 96.9% White, 0.7% African American, 0.2% Native American, 0.7% Asian, 0.01% Pacific Islander, 0.3% from other races, and 1.1% from two or more races. Hispanic or Latino of any race were 1.4% of the population.

=== 2000 ===
As of the census of 2000, there were 51,784 people, 19,725 households, and 14,320 families living in the county. The population density was 100 inhabitants per square mile (39/km^{2}). There were 21,410 housing units at an average density of 41 units per square mile (16/km^{2}). The racial makeup of the county was 97.52% White, 0.54% African American, 0.22% Native American, 0.57% Asian, 0.01% Pacific Islander, 0.21% from other races, and 0.92% from two or more races. Hispanic or Latino of any race were 0.98% of the population. 16.6% were of German, 16.4% English, 14% Irish, 9.6% Italian, 5% Polish and 4% Dutch ancestry according to Census 2000. 96.9% spoke English and 1.6% Spanish as their first language.

There were 19,725 households, out of which 34.70% had children under the age of 18 living with them, 58.70% were married couples living together, 9.80% had a female householder with no husband present, and 27.40% were non-families. 22.40% of all households were made up of individuals, and 9.40% had someone living alone who was 65 years of age or older. The average household size was 2.60 and the average family size was 3.04.

In the county, the population was spread out, with 27.00% under the age of 18, 7.00% from 18 to 24, 28.80% from 25 to 44, 24.00% from 45 to 64, and 13.10% who were 65 years of age or older. The median age was 38 years. For every 100 females there were 97.60 males. For every 100 females age 18 and over, there were 93.90 males.

The median income for a household in the county was $40,266, and the median income for a family was $46,509. Males had a median income of $32,161 versus $23,653 for females. The per capita income for the county was $18,673. About 6.0% of families and 8.4% of the population were below the poverty line, including 10.0% of those under age 18 and 4.2% of those age 65 or over. There were 8,784 men of military age residing in the county.

== Communities ==
=== Villages and census-designated place ===
#	Location	Population	Type
1	Waverly	3,382	Village
2	Owego†	2,632	Village
3	Apalachin	2,115	CDP
4	Tioga Terrace	2,082	CDP
5	Crest View Heights	1,770	CDP
6	Newark Valley	928	Village
7	Candor	786	Village
8	Spencer	719	Village
9	Nichols	457	Village

† – County seat

=== Towns ===
- Barton
- Berkshire
- Candor
- Newark Valley
- Nichols
- Owego
- Richford
- Spencer
- Tioga

=== Hamlet ===
- Lounsberry

== Politics ==
United States presidential election results for Tioga County, New York
Year	Republican		Democratic		Third party(ies)	
Year	No.	%	No.	%	No.	%
1884	4,367	52.29%	3,379	40.46%	605	7.24%
1888	4,852	54.69%	3,609	40.68%	411	4.63%
1892	4,221	54.76%	2,923	37.92%	564	7.32%
1896	4,849	61.06%	2,824	35.56%	268	3.37%
1900	4,747	59.09%	3,037	37.80%	250	3.11%
1904	4,628	59.99%	2,840	36.82%	246	3.19%
1908	4,247	58.55%	2,706	37.30%	301	4.15%
1912	2,642	41.08%	2,400	37.31%	1,390	21.61%
1916	3,376	52.78%	2,748	42.96%	272	4.25%
1920	6,772	71.20%	2,406	25.30%	333	3.50%
1924	7,834	72.47%	2,234	20.67%	742	6.86%
1928	9,963	76.89%	2,779	21.45%	216	1.67%
1932	8,047	65.27%	4,067	32.99%	214	1.74%
1936	9,163	67.18%	4,305	31.56%	172	1.26%
1940	9,618	69.91%	4,081	29.66%	59	0.43%
1944	8,934	69.85%	3,831	29.95%	25	0.20%
1948	8,673	70.16%	3,385	27.38%	304	2.46%
1952	11,799	78.19%	3,259	21.60%	32	0.21%
1956	11,958	78.95%	3,188	21.05%	0	0.00%
1960	12,572	72.12%	4,855	27.85%	4	0.02%
1964	7,147	40.68%	10,411	59.26%	9	0.05%
1968	10,441	61.58%	5,336	31.47%	1,179	6.95%
1972	13,396	70.84%	5,470	28.93%	44	0.23%
1976	11,824	62.58%	6,969	36.89%	100	0.53%
1980	10,291	53.56%	6,690	34.82%	2,233	11.62%
1984	14,856	71.36%	5,860	28.15%	101	0.49%
1988	12,670	60.49%	8,102	38.68%	174	0.83%
1992	9,287	40.26%	7,791	33.78%	5,987	25.96%
1996	9,416	44.24%	8,769	41.20%	3,097	14.55%
2000	12,239	54.50%	9,170	40.83%	1,048	4.67%
2004	13,762	57.58%	9,694	40.56%	446	1.87%
2008	12,536	54.20%	10,172	43.98%	423	1.83%
2012	12,117	56.13%	8,930	41.36%	542	2.51%
2016	13,260	59.46%	7,526	33.75%	1,513	6.79%
2020	14,791	59.08%	9,634	38.48%	611	2.44%
2024	15,038	61.23%	9,437	38.43%	84	0.34%

== Education ==
School districts include:

- Candor Central School District
- Dryden Central School District
- Ithaca City School District
- Maine-Endwell Central School District
- Marathon Central School District
- Newark Valley Central School District
- Owego Apalachin Central School District
- Spencer-Van Etten Central School District
- Tioga Central School District
- Union-Endicott Central School District
- Vestal Central School District
- Waverly Central School District
- Whitney Point Central School District

== See also ==
- List of counties in New York
- National Register of Historic Places listings in Tioga County, New York
