= Truman I. Lacey =

American architect

- Born: January 11, 1834; Wyoming County, Pennsylvania
- Died: November 25, 1914 (aged 80); Binghamton, New York
- Occupation: Architect

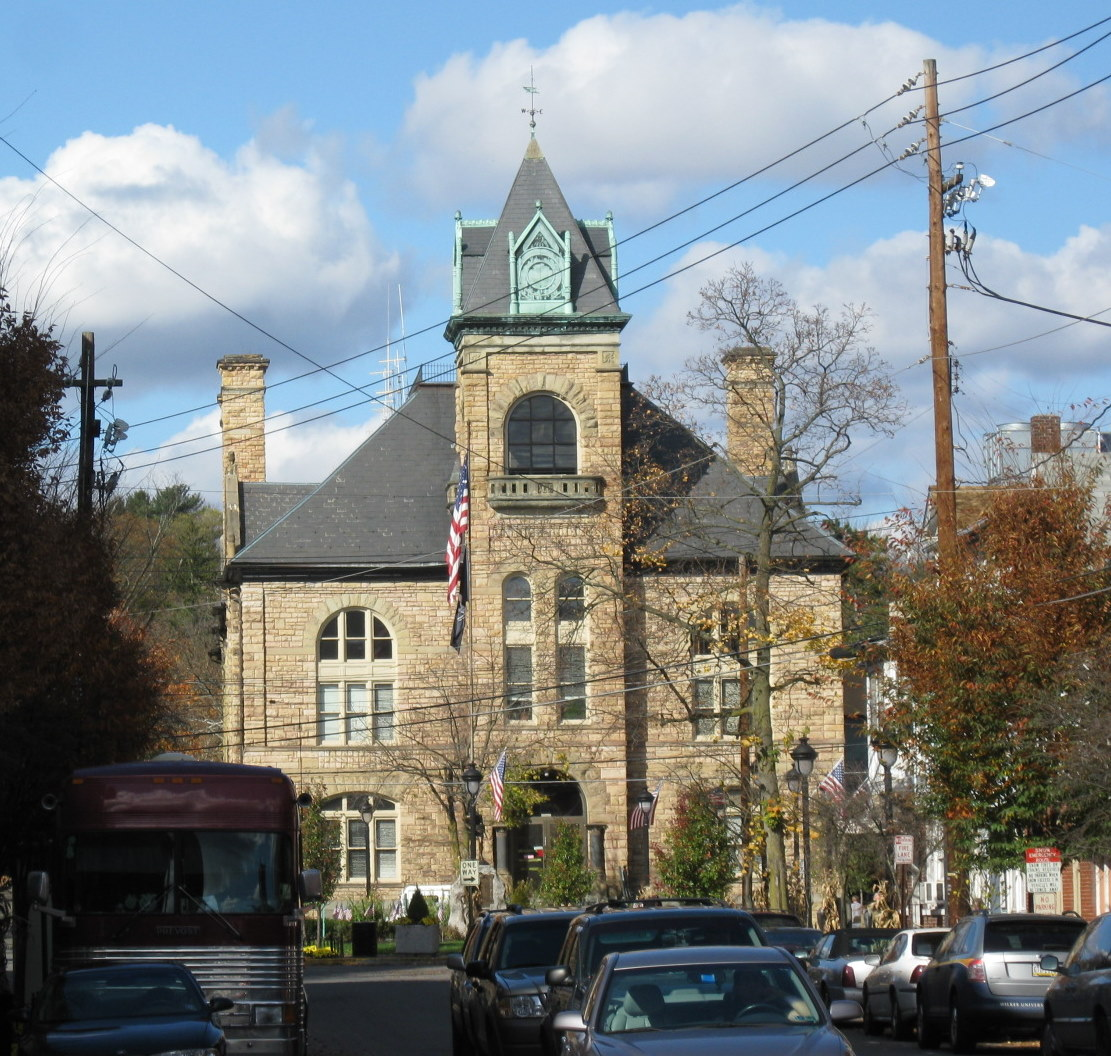
The Monroe County Courthouse in Stroudsburg, Pennsylvania, completed in 1890.

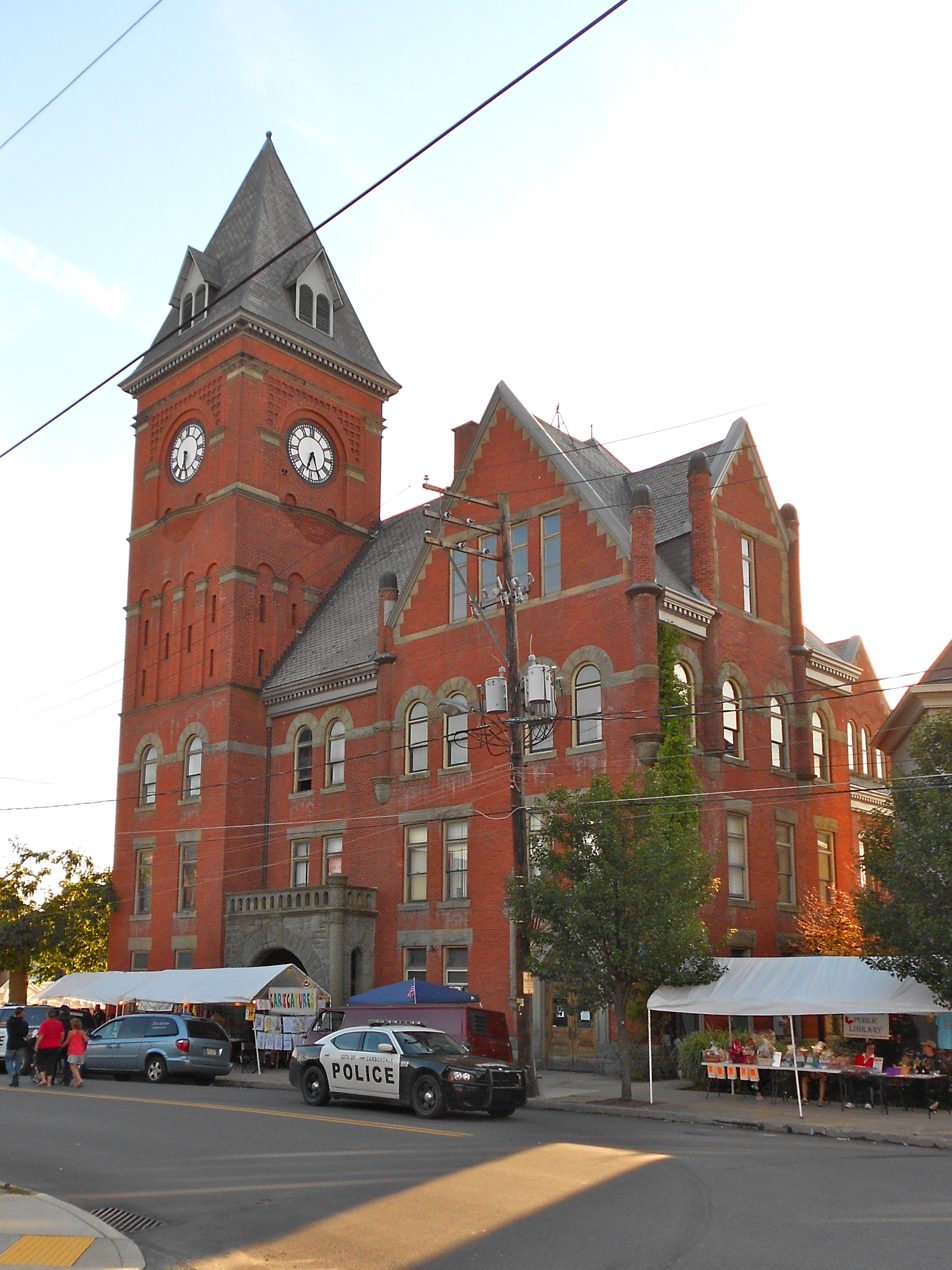
The Carbondale City Hall in Carbondale, Pennsylvania, completed in 1894.

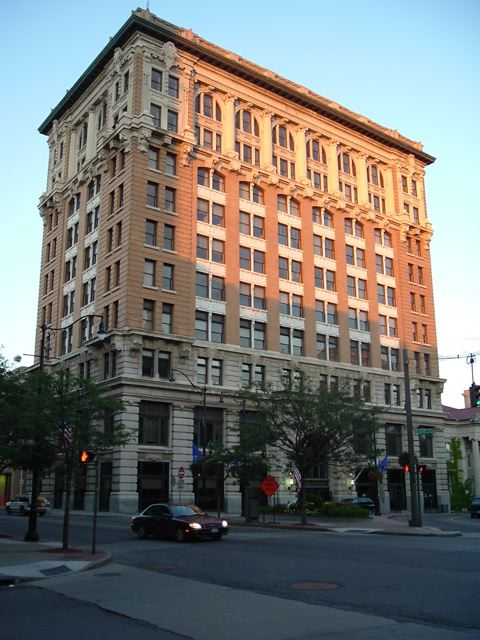
The Security Mutual Life Insurance Company Building in Binghamton, completed in 1905.

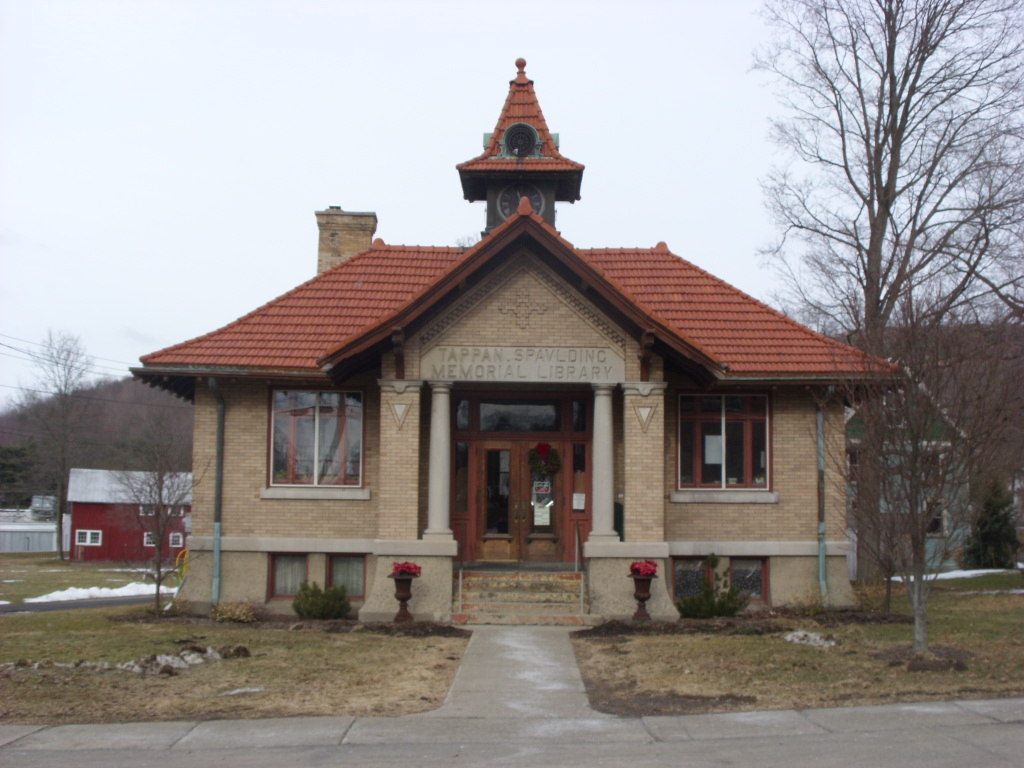
The Tappan-Spaulding Memorial Library in Newark Valley, completed in 1908.

Truman I. Lacey (1834–1914) was an American architect in practice in Binghamton, New York from 1872 until 1914.

== Life and career ==
Truman Isaac Lacey was born January 11, 1834, in Braintrim Township, Pennsylvania, to David Lacey, a carpenter, and Ruth (Lake) Lacey. Lacey was a descendant of Isaac Lacey, a Connecticut native who settled in Pennsylvania in the 1790s. In 1856 Lacey moved with his parents and siblings to Auburn Township, Susquehanna County, and in 1857 upon his marriage he moved to Wyalusing. As a young man, he worked variously as a carpenter and cabinetmaker. In 1871, he was declared bankrupt. In 1872 Lacey moved the family to Binghamton, where he established himself as an architect. At the time, the only other architect in the area was Isaac G. Perry.

Lacey was a private practitioner until 1888, when he formed a partnership with his eldest son, B. Taylor Lacey, in the new firm of T. I. Lacey & Son. In 1889 Lacey's younger son, Arthur T. Lacey, also began working in his office. In 1892, they opened a branch office at Scranton, under the management of B. Taylor. In 1902 Lacey reorganized the partnership, with B. Taylor as his partner for work done in the Scranton office, and Arthur T. as partner for that in Binghamton. Circa 1908 B. Taylor left to practice in Scranton on his own account. Lacey and his younger son practiced together until his death in 1914. Arthur T. Lacey and his sister, Genevieve Lacey, continued the firm under its original name. After Genevieve retired, Arthur T. Lacey admitted his own sons as partners beginning in 1928, and practiced until his own death in 1959. His two sons continued the firm until 1976.

Lacey joined the Western Association of Architects in 1888, which was merged with the American Institute of Architects in 1889, but allowed his fellowship to lapse in 1895.

== Personal life ==
Lacey was married twice. In 1857 he married Juliette Gaylord of Wyalusing. She died in 1858. Later the same year he married Clarissa Pamela Burch of Auburn. They had a total of seven children, all born in Wyalusing:

- Effie Amelia Lacey (1860–1879)
- Freddie Lacey (1861–1862)
- Genevieve Lacey (1862–1944)
- Anna Juliette Lacey (1864–1920)
- Bascom Taylor Lacey (1866–1958)
- Truman Powell Lacey (1868–1869)
- Arthur Truman Lacey (1870–1959)

Prior to his bankruptcy, Lacey had become fairly prosperous in Wyalusing. In 1869, he built a substantial home for his family at 129 Church Street in the borough. The house incorporates elements of the Italianate and Carpenter Gothic styles and is included in the Wyalusing Borough Historic District. After moving to Binghamton, he built a new house at 114 Park Avenue in the Southside neighborhood of Binghamton. Built probably in the 1870s, the house features elaborate Stick style detail.

Mrs. Lacey died December 18, 1909, in Binghamton, followed by her husband on November 25, 1914, at the age of 80.

== Legacy ==
At least nine buildings designed by Lacey have been listed on the United States National Register of Historic Places, and others contribute to listed historic districts.

== Architectural works ==
- Truman I. Lacey house, (Note: A contributing property to the Wyalusing Borough Historic District, listed on the National Register of Historic Places in 2003.) 129 Church St, Wyalusing, Pennsylvania (1869)
- George Washington School, Oak and North Sts, Binghamton, New York (1879, demolished)
- Tabernacle United Methodist Church, 83 Main St, Binghamton, New York (1883)
- Clinton Street School, Clinton St, Binghamton, New York (1884, demolished)
- Elijah W. Brigham house, (Note: A contributing property to the Johnson City Historic District, listed on the National Register of Historic Places in 2011.) 107 Main St, Johnson City, New York (1885, NRHP 2005)
- Bath Baptist Church, 14 Howell St, Bath, New York (1887–88, NRHP 2013)
- Ross Building, (Note: A contributing property to the Court Street Historic District, listed on the National Register of Historic Places in 1984.) 72 Court St, Binghamton, New York (1889–90, demolished 2008)
- Bevier Street School, Bevier St, Binghamton, New York (1890, demolished)
- First Presbyterian Church chapel, 201 10th St, Honesdale, Pennsylvania (1890–91)
- Laurel Avenue School, Laurel Ave, Binghamton, New York (1890, demolished)
- Monroe County Courthouse, 610 Monroe St, Stroudsburg, Pennsylvania (1890, NRHP 1979)
- Rossville School, Binghamton, New York (1890, demolished)
- Carbondale City Hall, 1 N Main St, Carbondale, Pennsylvania (1892–94, NRHP 1983)
- Fayette L. Rounds house, 301 N Main St, Vestal, New York (1895, NRHP 2010)
- United Methodist Church of Cooperstown, 66 Chestnut St, Cooperstown, New York (1903)
- Press Building, 19 Chenango St, Binghamton, New York (1904–05)
- Security Mutual Life Insurance Company Building, 100 Court St, Binghamton, New York (1904–05)
- Tappan-Spaulding Memorial Library, 6 Rock St, Newark Valley, New York (1908, NRHP 2006)
- Saints Cyril and Methodius Slovak Roman Catholic School, 144 Clinton St, Binghamton, New York (1910–11, NRHP 2007)
- Nichols High School (former), 84 Cady Ave, Nichols, New York (1911–12, NRHP 1996)
- St. James Church, 147 Main St, Johnson City, New York (1913–14)
- Marlborough Building, 81 Clinton St, Binghamton, New York (1914, NRHP 2008)
