= Johnson City Historic District =

Historic district in New York, United States

- U.S. National Register of Historic Places
- U.S. Historic district
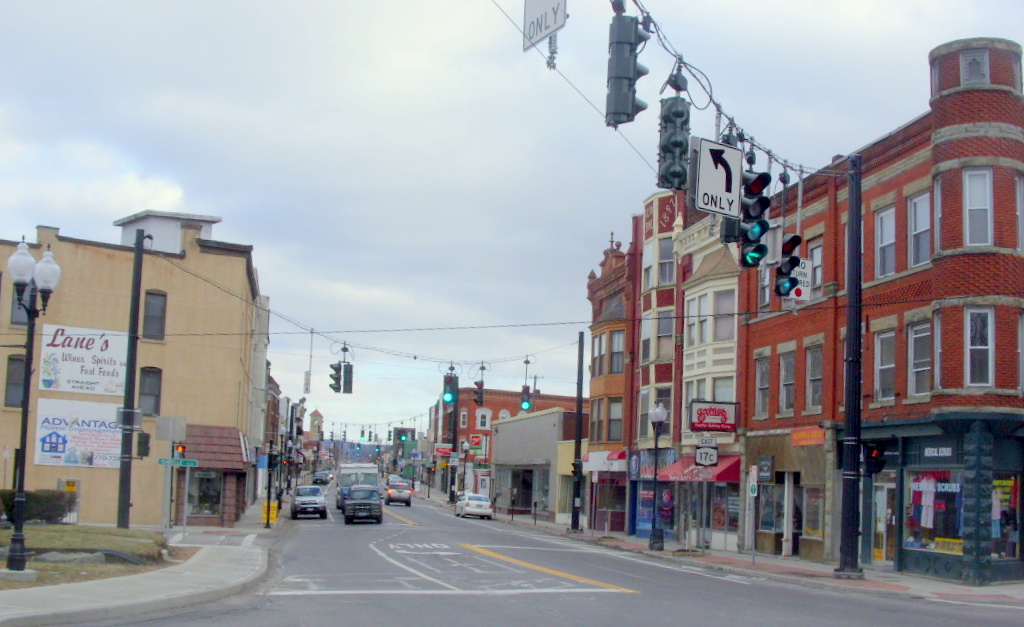
- Johnson City Historic District, February 2009

- Location within New York Location within the United States
- Location: Generally Corliss Ave., Arch St., Main St., Lester Ave. & Helen Dr., Johnson City, New York
- Coordinates: 42°06′51″N 75°57′14″W
- Area: 78.55 acres (31.79 ha)
- Built: c. 1888 – 1966
- Architects: T. I. Lacey; T. I. Lacey & Son; Lacey, Schenck & Cummings; A. T. Lacey & Sons
- Architectural style: Romanesque Revival, Gothic Revival, Colonial Revival, Moderne
- NRHP reference No.: 11000593
- Added to NRHP: August 30, 2011

Johnson City Historic District is a national historic district in Johnson City, New York. It encompasses 183 contributing buildings and 1 contributing site in a mixed, residential, commercial, and industrial core of Johnson City. It developed between about 1888 and 1966, and includes notable examples of Romanesque Revival, Gothic Revival, Colonial Revival, and Streamline Moderne style architecture. Located in the district are the previously listed Goodwill Theatre, United States Post Office, and Your Home Library. Other notable contributing resources include the Endicott-Johnson Athletic Association East Branch Recreational Center (1947), St. James Roman Catholic Church Complex (1914–1950), Ash Block (c. 1901), Tacoma Block (1892, 1945), Rich Block, Dawson Block (1898–1899), Woolworths (c. 1937), Men's Quality Shop (1966), Red Robin Diner (1950, 1959), Thomson Hall (1951), Sarah Jane Johnson Methodist Church (1927), Charles F. Johnson, Jr., House (1919), Endicott-Johnson's Pioneer Annex (1916), Endicott-Johnson's Jigger Factory (1926), Endicott-Johnson's Sunrise Building (1929), Eagle Felt Mill (1898), Ansco Factory and Gate House (1947), Endicott-Johnson's Medical Facility (1918), Endicott-Johnson's Victory Factory (1919-1920), Endicott-Johnson's New Toe Box Factory (1914), Endicott-Johnson's Firehouse (1916), and the Village Hall and Fire Station (1899).

It was added to the National Register of Historic Places in 2011.

== Gallery ==
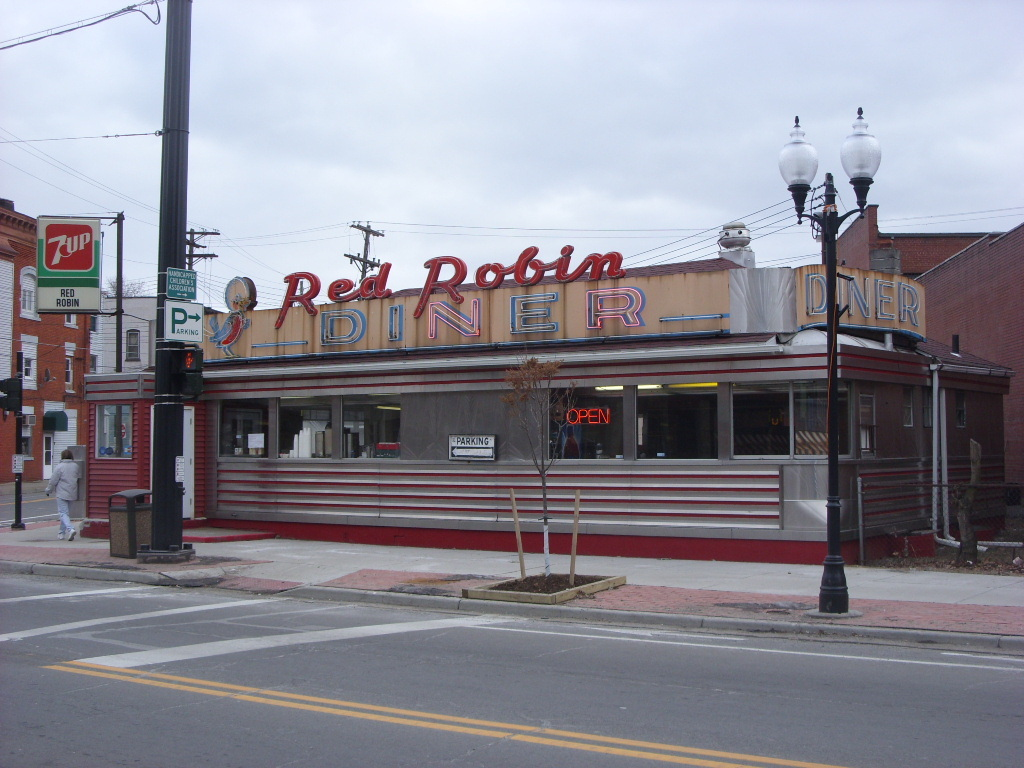
Red Robin Diner, February 2009

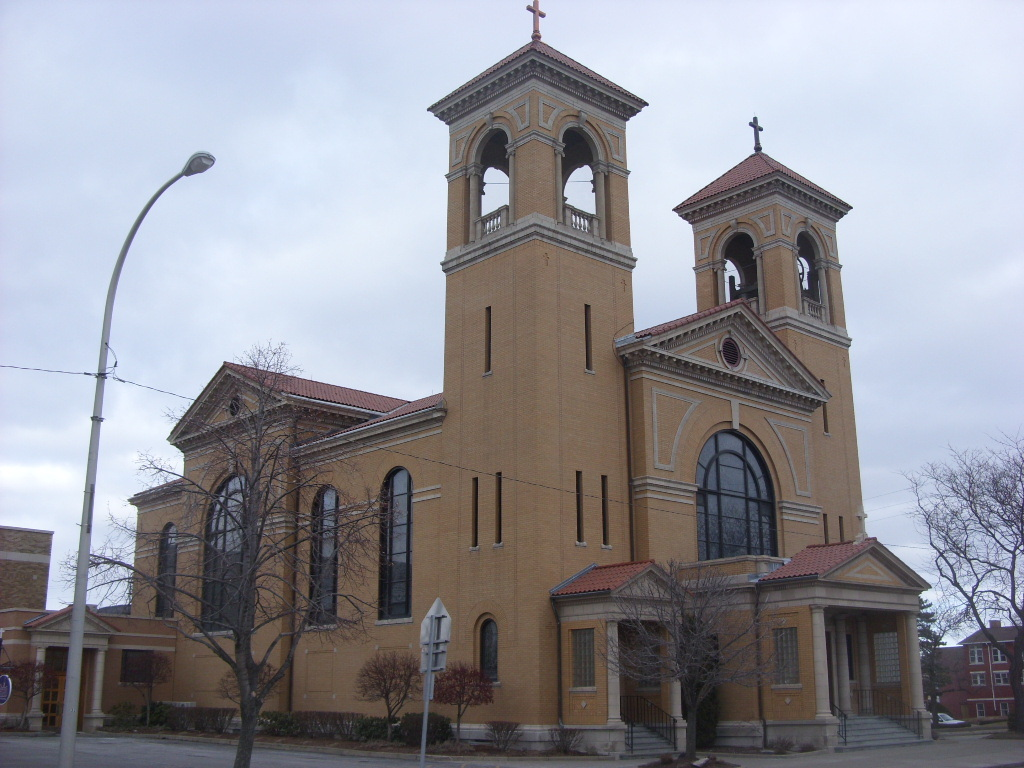
St. James Roman Catholic Church, February 2009

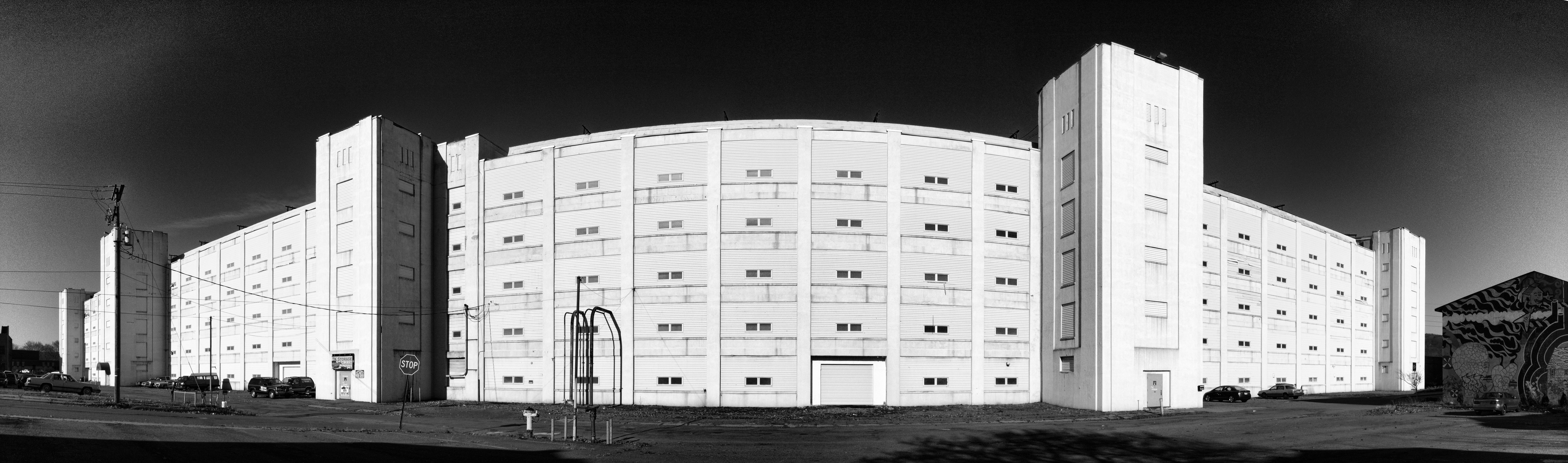
View of the E-J Victory Factory building, from 2009

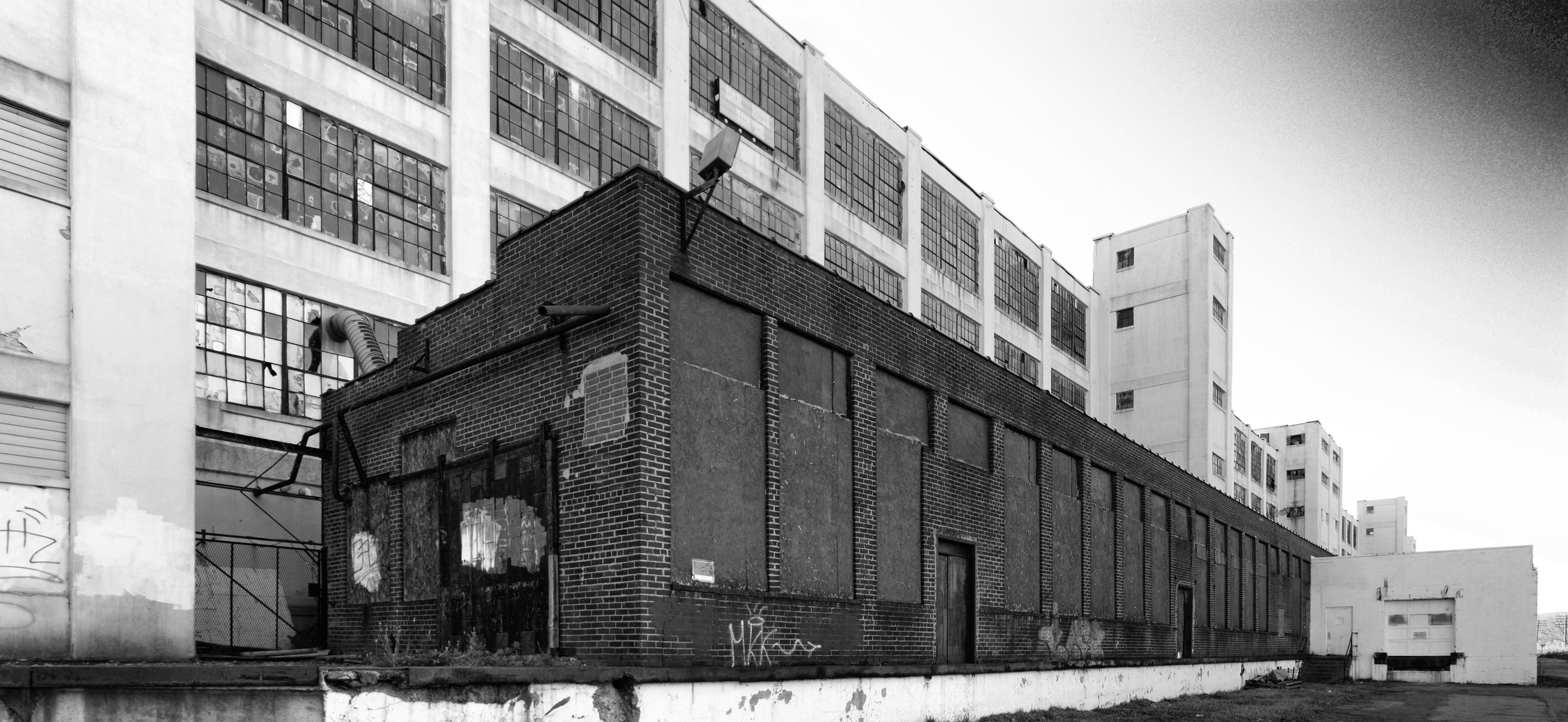
View of the E-J Victory Factory building, from 2009

== See also ==
- National Register of Historic Places listings in Broome County, New York
