= Purple House =

Purple House may refer to:

- George E. Purple House in LaGrange, Illinois
- Gilbert E. Purple House in Newark Valley, New York
- Purple House Press, a publishing company
- Purple House, a non-for-profit health organisation in Alice Springs, Australia
