= Carbondale City Hall and Courthouse =

- U.S. National Register of Historic Places
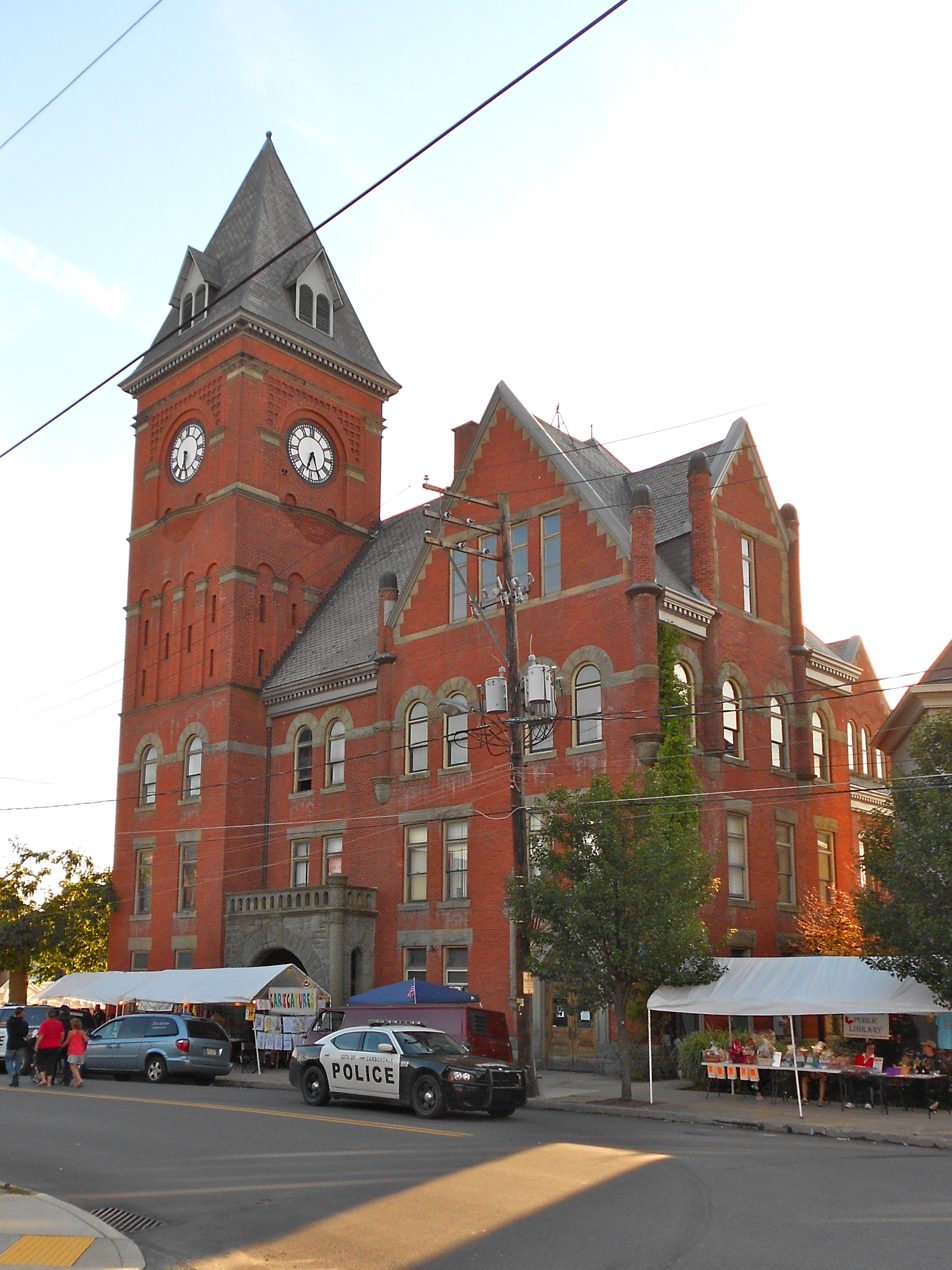
- In 2013

- Location within Pennsylvania Location within the United States
- Location: One N. Main St., Carbondale, Pennsylvania
- Coordinates: 41°34′20″N 75°30′13″W
- Area: 1.5 acres (0.61 ha)
- Built: 1859, 1892-1894
- Architect: T. I. Lacey & Son
- Architectural style: Romanesque
- NRHP reference No.: 83002248
- Added to NRHP: January 6, 1983

Carbondale City Hall and Courthouse, also known as the Carbondale Municipal Building, is a historic city hall and courthouse building located at Carbondale, Lackawanna County, Pennsylvania. It was built in 1892–1894, and is a brick and bluestone building in the Romanesque-style. It consists of five-story, square, corner tower; three-story wing; and two-story brick wing. The three-story wing, along with the tower, houses the Carbondale City Hall. It features a massive, half-circle primary entrance and rusticated stone and brick turrets. The two-story wing was built in 1859 as the courthouse, and incorporated into the new building.

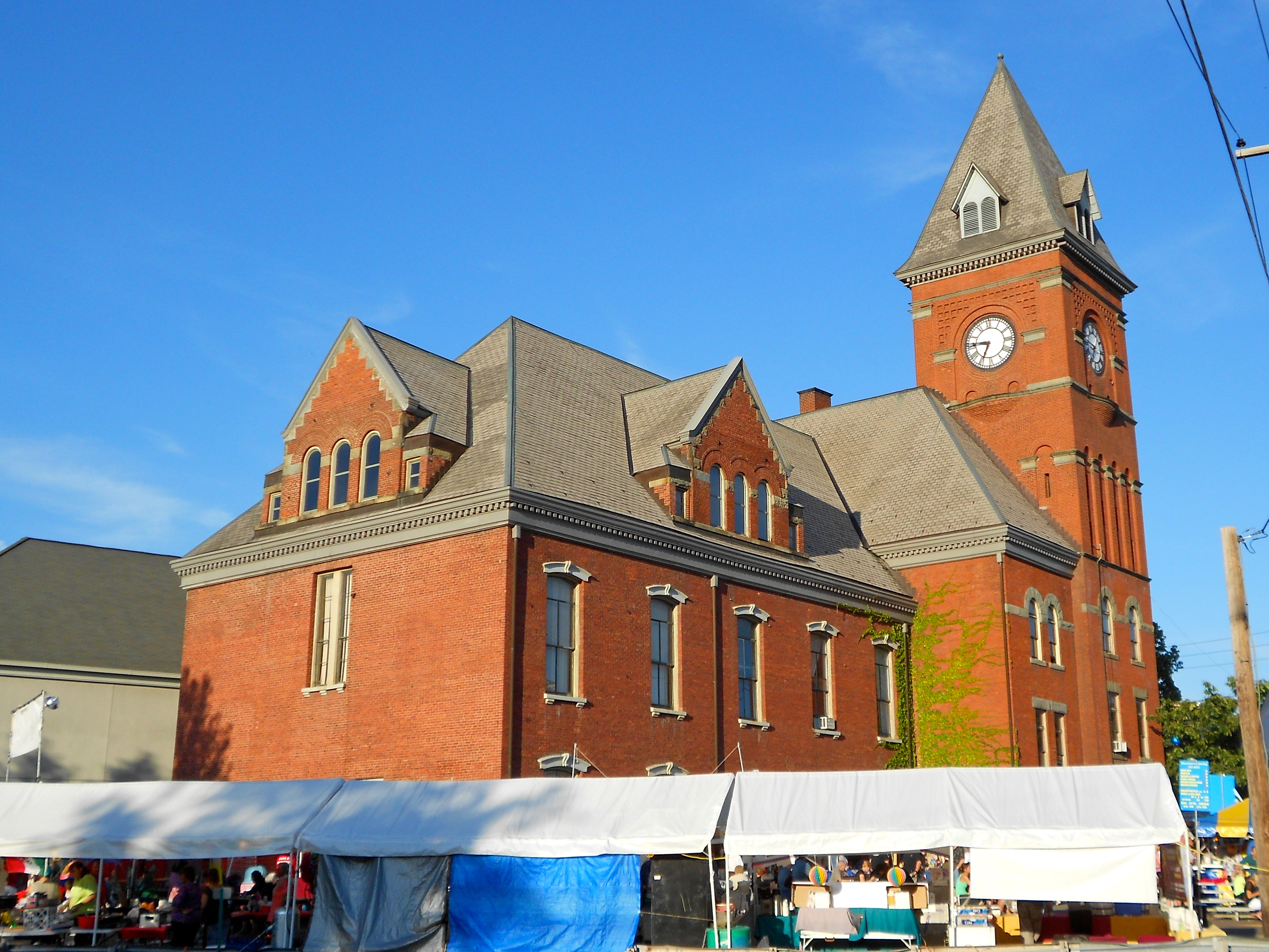
View of the rear of the building, showing the two-story wing

It was added to the National Register of Historic Places in 1983.

The building's third floor houses the Carbondale Historical Society and Museum.
