= Monroe County Courthouse (Pennsylvania) =

- U.S. National Register of Historic Places
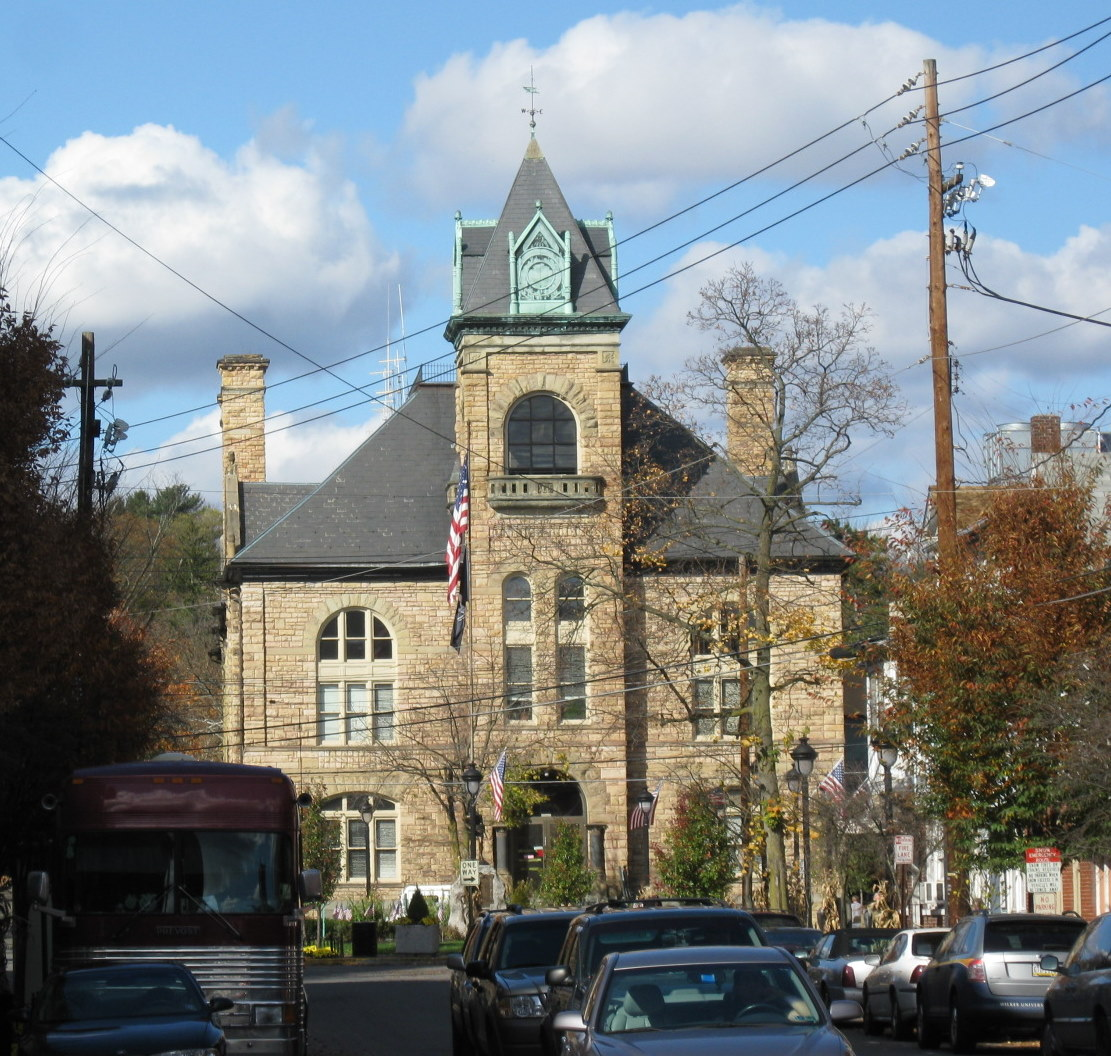
- Monroe County Courthouse, November 2009

- Location within Pennsylvania Location within the United States
- Interactive map showing the location of Monroe County Courthouse
- Location: Seventh and Monroe Sts., Stroudsburg, Pennsylvania
- Coordinates: 40°59′13″N 75°11′43″W
- Area: 0.7 acres (0.28 ha)
- Built: 1890; 136 years ago 1934; 92 years ago
- Architect: T. I. Lacey & Son
- Architectural style: Romanesque
- NRHP reference No.: 09000097
- Added to NRHP: April 18, 1979

Monroe County Courthouse is a historic county courthouse located in Stroudsburg, Pennsylvania. The original section was built in 1890, and is a three-story, ashlar sandstone and limestone building measuring 65 feet (20 m) wide and 180 feet (55 m) long. It is in the Romanesque Revival style. An identically sized addition was built in 1934, as a Public Works Administration project.

It was added to the National Register of Historic Places in 1979.

== See also ==
- List of state and county courthouses in Pennsylvania
