= Saints Cyril and Methodius Slovak Roman Catholic School =

- U.S. National Register of Historic Places
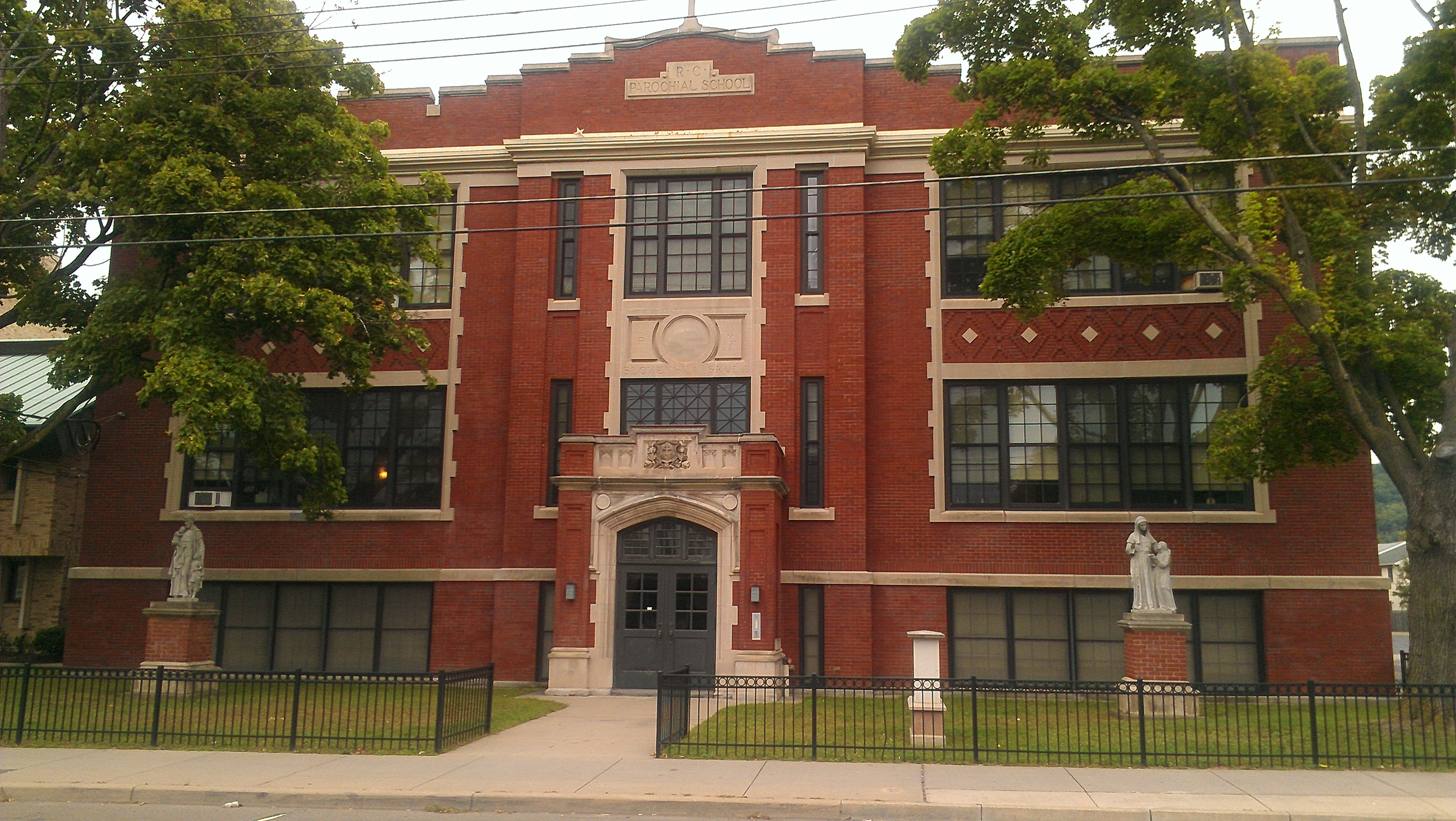
- Schoolhouse Apartments, September 2013

- Location within New York Location within the United States
- Location: 144–146 Clinton St., Binghamton, New York
- Coordinates: 42°6′21″N 75°55′30″W
- Area: less than one acre
- Built: 1910
- Architect: T. I. Lacey & Son
- Architectural style: Late 19th And 20th Century Revivals
- NRHP reference No.: 07000095
- Added to NRHP: March 1, 2007

Saints Cyril and Methodius Slovak Roman Catholic School, now known as Schoolhouse Apartments, is a historic Catholic school building located at Binghamton in Broome County, New York. It was built in 1910 and is a two-story over a raised basement, steel frame building clad in brick. The building is rectangular in shape, 85 feet wide by 45 feet deep.

It was listed on the National Register of Historic Places in 2007.
