= Nowland House =

Historic house in New York, United States

- U.S. National Register of Historic Places
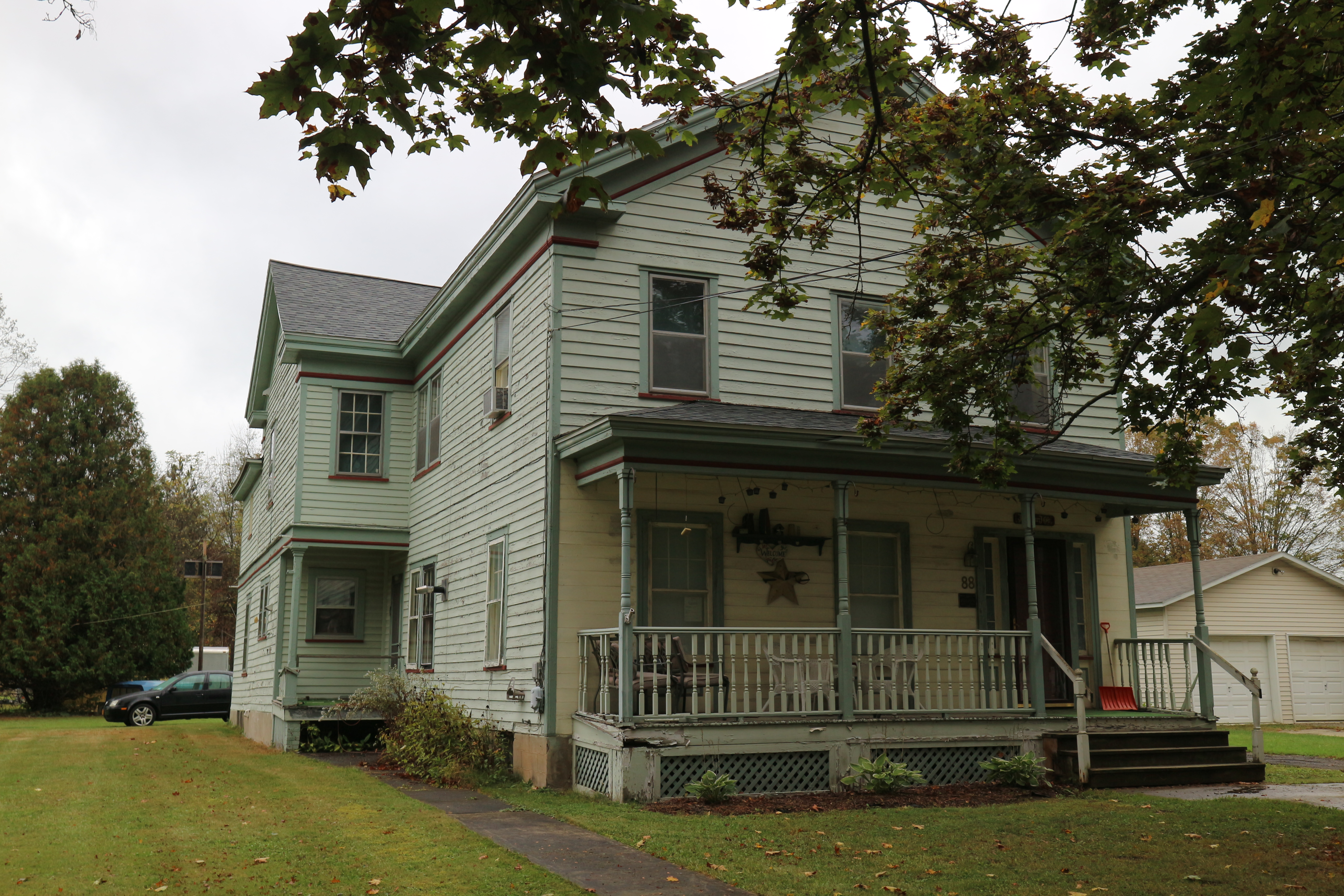
- Nowland House, September 2017

- Location within New York Location within the United States
- Location: 88 S. Main St., Newark Valley, New York
- Coordinates: 42°13′10″N 76°11′14″W
- Area: 0.6 acres (0.24 ha)
- Built: ca. 1868
- Architectural style: Mid 19th Century Revival, Greek Revival
- MPS: Newark Valley MPS
- NRHP reference No.: 97001488
- Added to NRHP: December 15, 1997

Nowland House is a historic home located at Newark Valley in Tioga County, New York, United States. The two story, cross gabled frame house was constructed about 1868 and exhibits characteristics of the Greek Revival and Italianate styles. It is essentially T-shaped in plan and features two porches. Also on the property are a garage and chicken house / feed shed.

It was listed on the National Register of Historic Places in 1997.
