= Sutton-Chapman-Howland House =

Historic house in New York, United States

- U.S. National Register of Historic Places
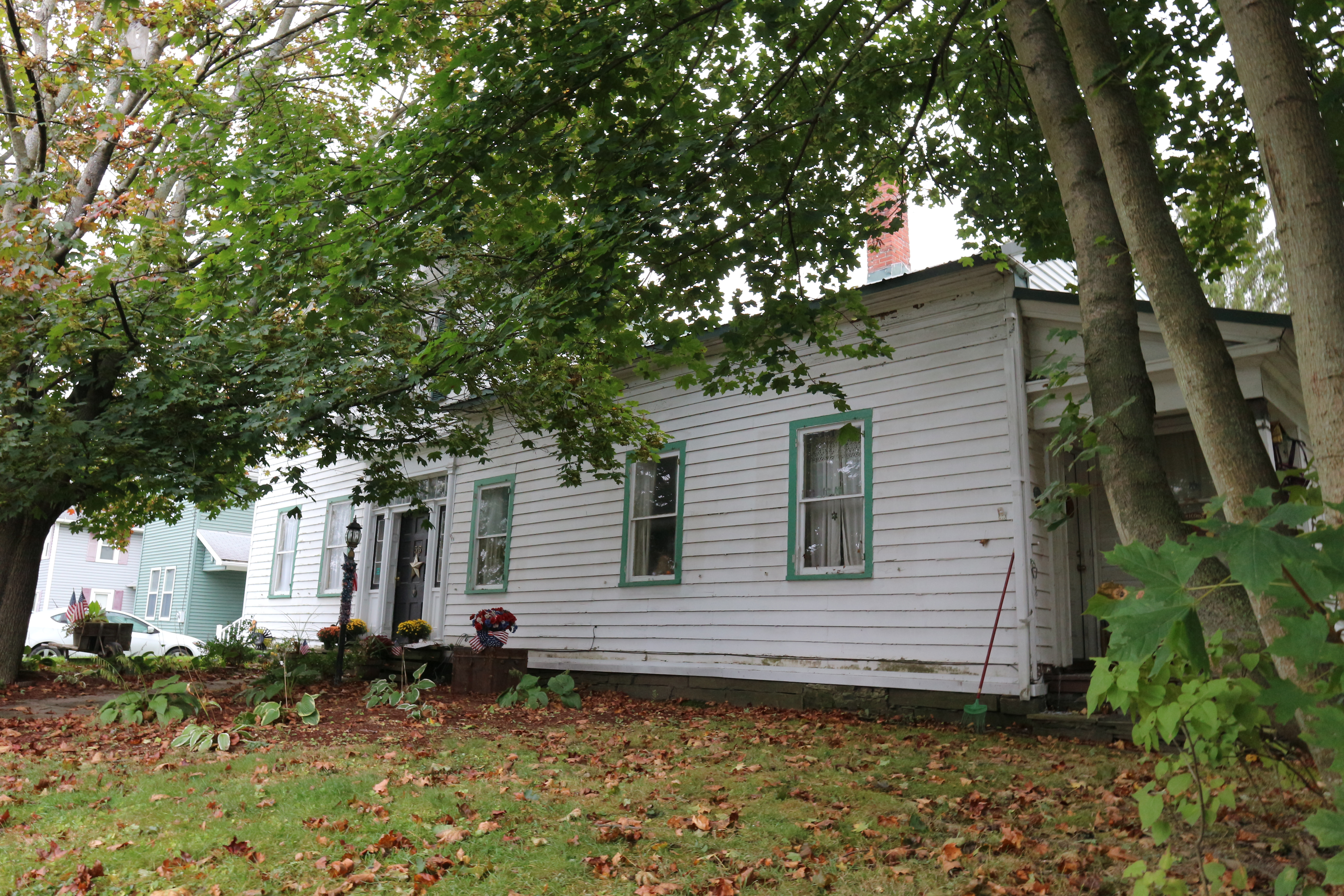

- Location within New York Location within the United States
- Location: 55 Main St., Newark Valley, New York
- Coordinates: 42°16′22″N 76°10′28″W
- Area: 4.1 acres (1.7 ha)
- Built: 1835
- Architectural style: Early Republic, Federal
- MPS: Newark Valley MPS
- NRHP reference No.: 97001492
- Added to NRHP: December 15, 1997

Sutton-Chapman-Howland House is a historic home located at Newark Valley in Tioga County, New York. The frame house was constructed in the 1830s in the Federal style. It consists of a two-story front gabled main block, a side gabled one story wing, and a gabled woodshed wing.

It was listed on the National Register of Historic Places in 1997.

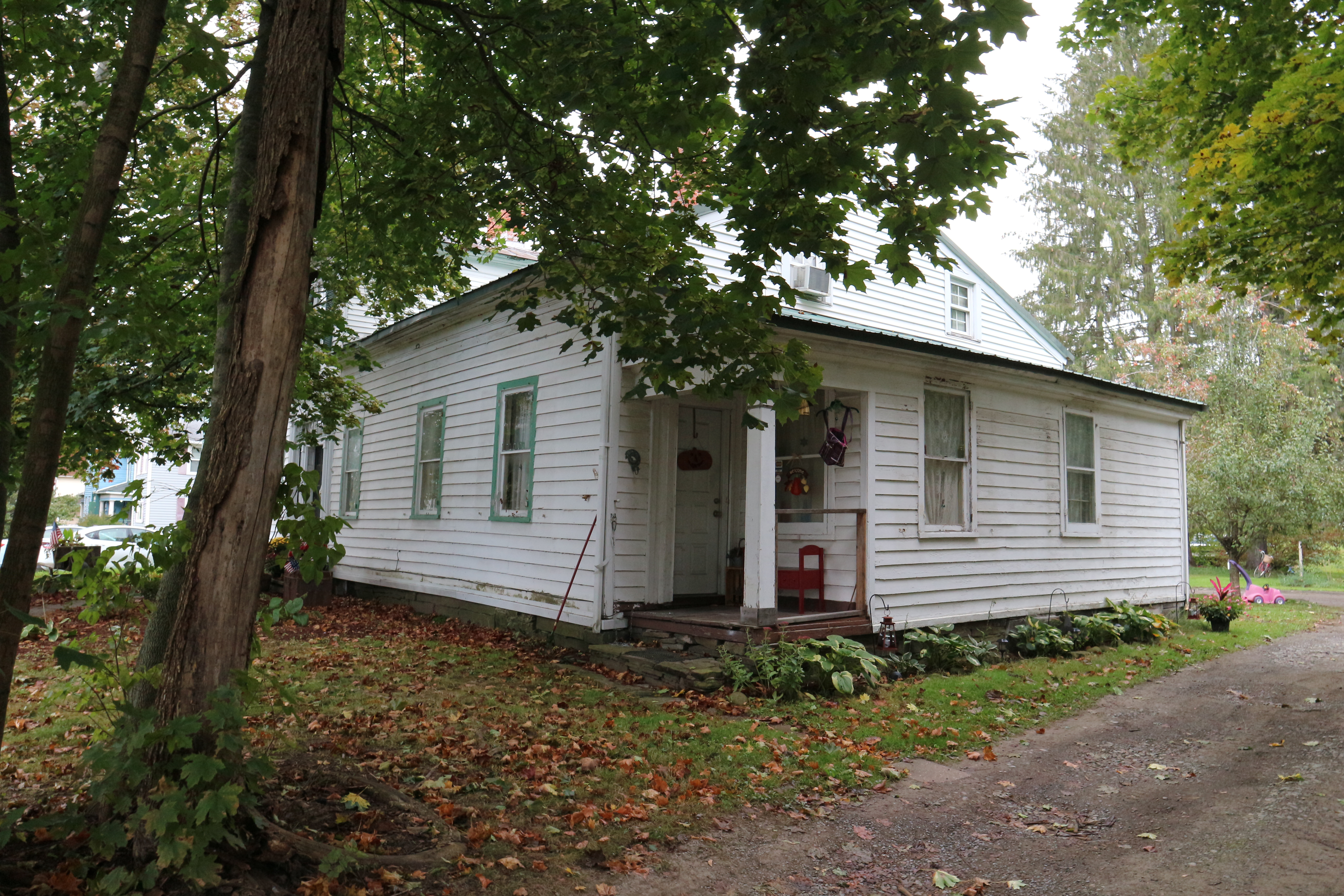
