= Newark Valley Municipal Building and Tappan-Spaulding Memorial Library =

- U.S. National Register of Historic Places
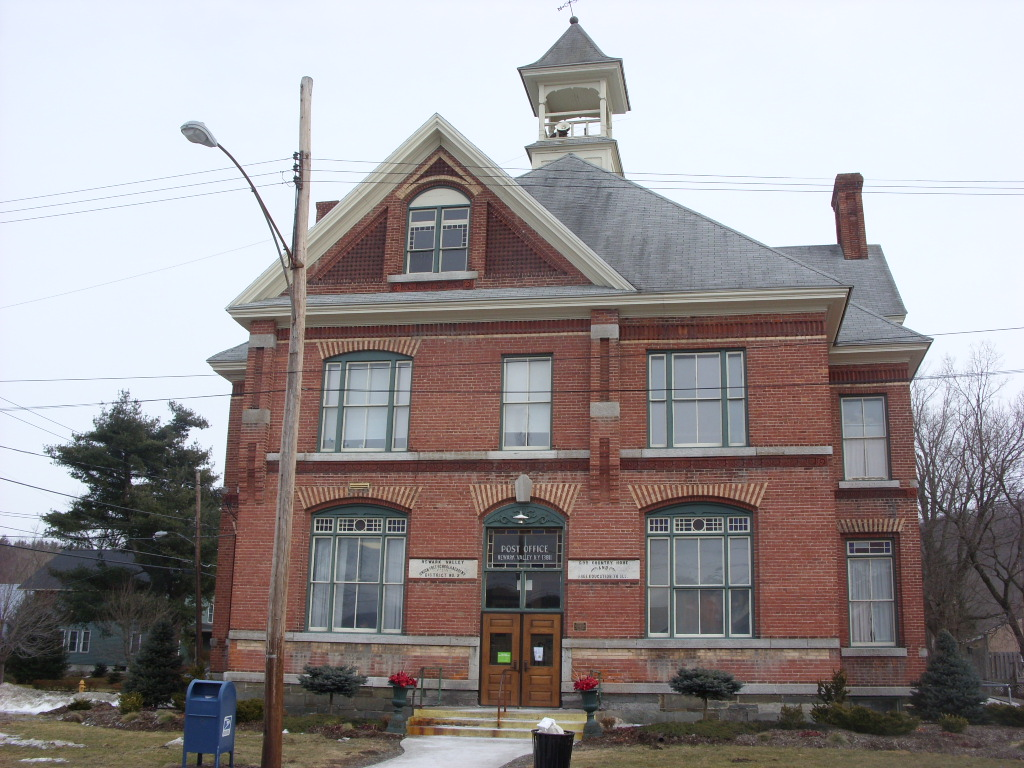
- Newark Valley Municipal Building, March 2009

- Location within New York Location within the United States
- Location: 9 Park St. and 8 Rock St., Newark Valley, New York
- Coordinates: 42°13′25″N 76°11′2″W
- Area: 1.2 acres (0.49 ha)
- Built: 1887
- Built by: Alfred E. Badgley
- Architect: T. I. Lacey & Son
- Architectural style: Late Victorian
- MPS: Newark Valley MPS
- NRHP reference No.: 06000971
- Added to NRHP: November 01, 2006

Newark Valley Municipal Building and Tappan-Spaulding Memorial Library is a historic municipal building and library building located at Newark Valley in Tioga County, New York. The municipal building is a 2 1/2-story brick building with a cut stone foundation and full basement built in 1887 as the Union Free School and Academy. A 2-story, 45-foot rear wing was completed in 1904, and the building was altered for its current use in 1931. The library building was constructed in 1908 and is a small 1-story brick building in a cruciform plan. The roof features red terra cotta tiles and is crowned with a three-stage tower with a steep pyramidal roof.

It was listed on the National Register of Historic Places in 2006.

== Gallery ==
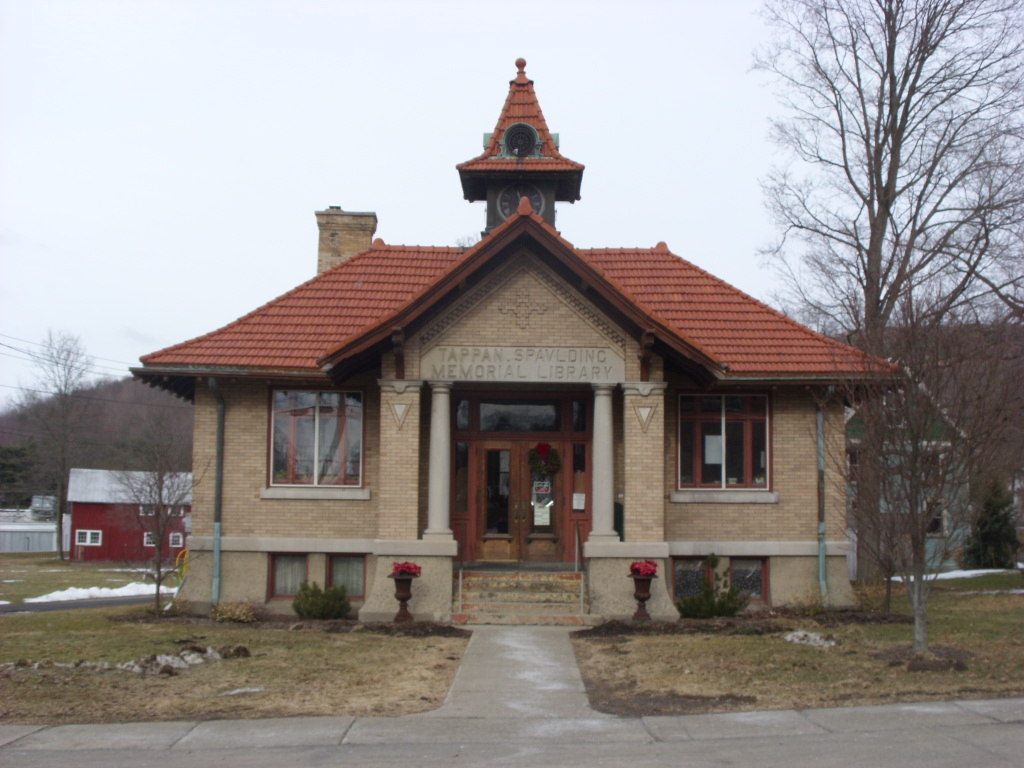
Tappan-Spaulding Memorial Library, March 2009
