= Knapp House =

Historic house in Tioga County, New York, United States

- Dr. Hiram L. Knapp House
- U.S. National Register of Historic Places
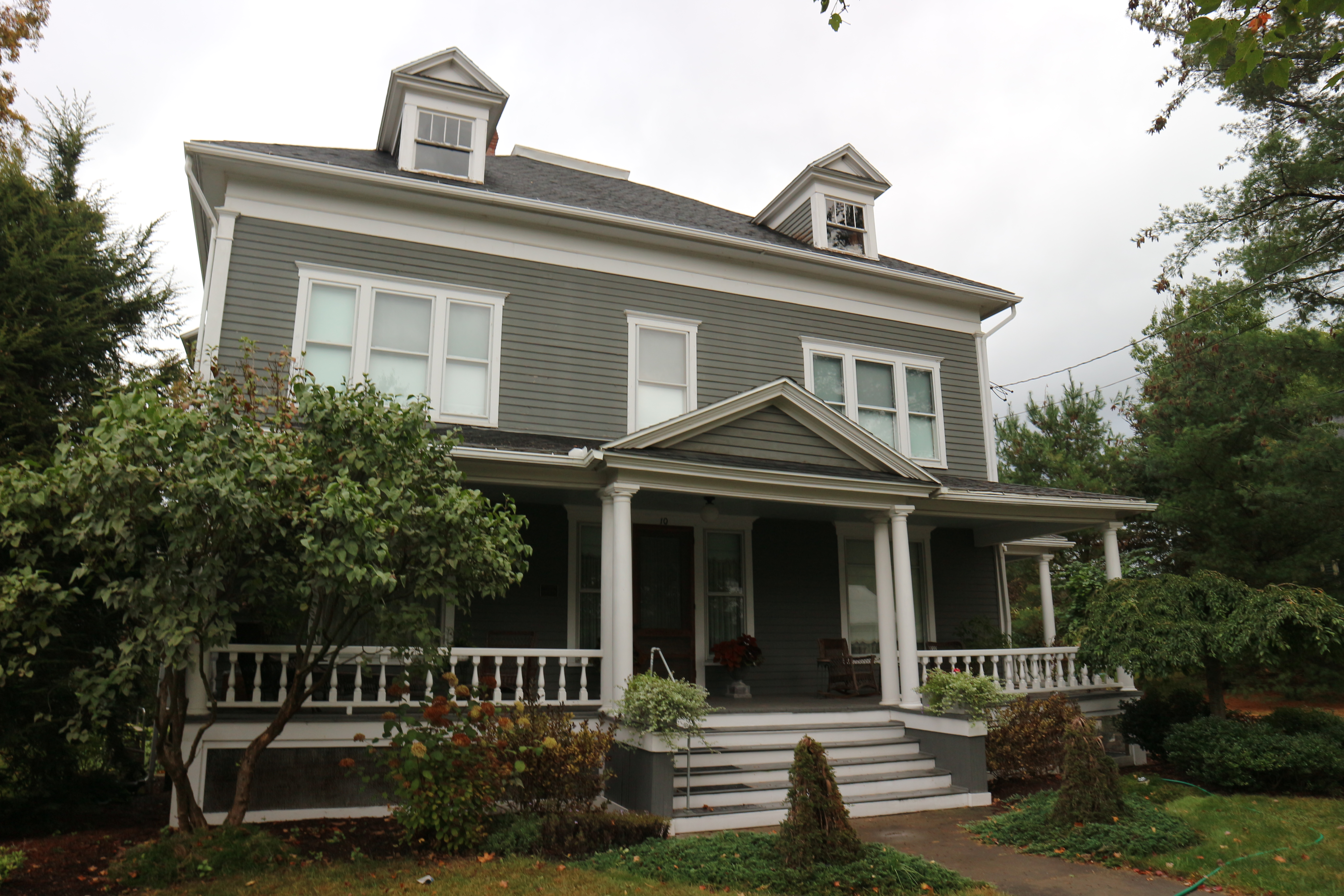

- Location within New York Location within the United States
- Location: 10 Rock St., Newark Valley, New York
- Coordinates: 42°13′24″N 76°11′0″W
- Area: 1.1 acres (0.45 ha)
- Built: 1905
- Architect: Barker, Cephus
- Architectural style: Colonial Revival
- MPS: Newark Valley MPS
- NRHP reference No.: 98000159
- Added to NRHP: March 16, 1998

Dr. Hiram L. Knapp House is a historic home located in the village of Newark Valley in Tioga County, New York. It is a two-story, frame Colonial Revival style residence with a hipped roof built about 1905. Also on the property is a two-story, gambrel roofed carriage house and a chicken coop.

The house, with its outbuildings, was listed on the National Register of Historic Places in 1998. It is one of several historic properties in the village, including the Tappan-Spaulding Memorial Library and the Newark Valley Municipal Building, both of which are also listed on the National Register.

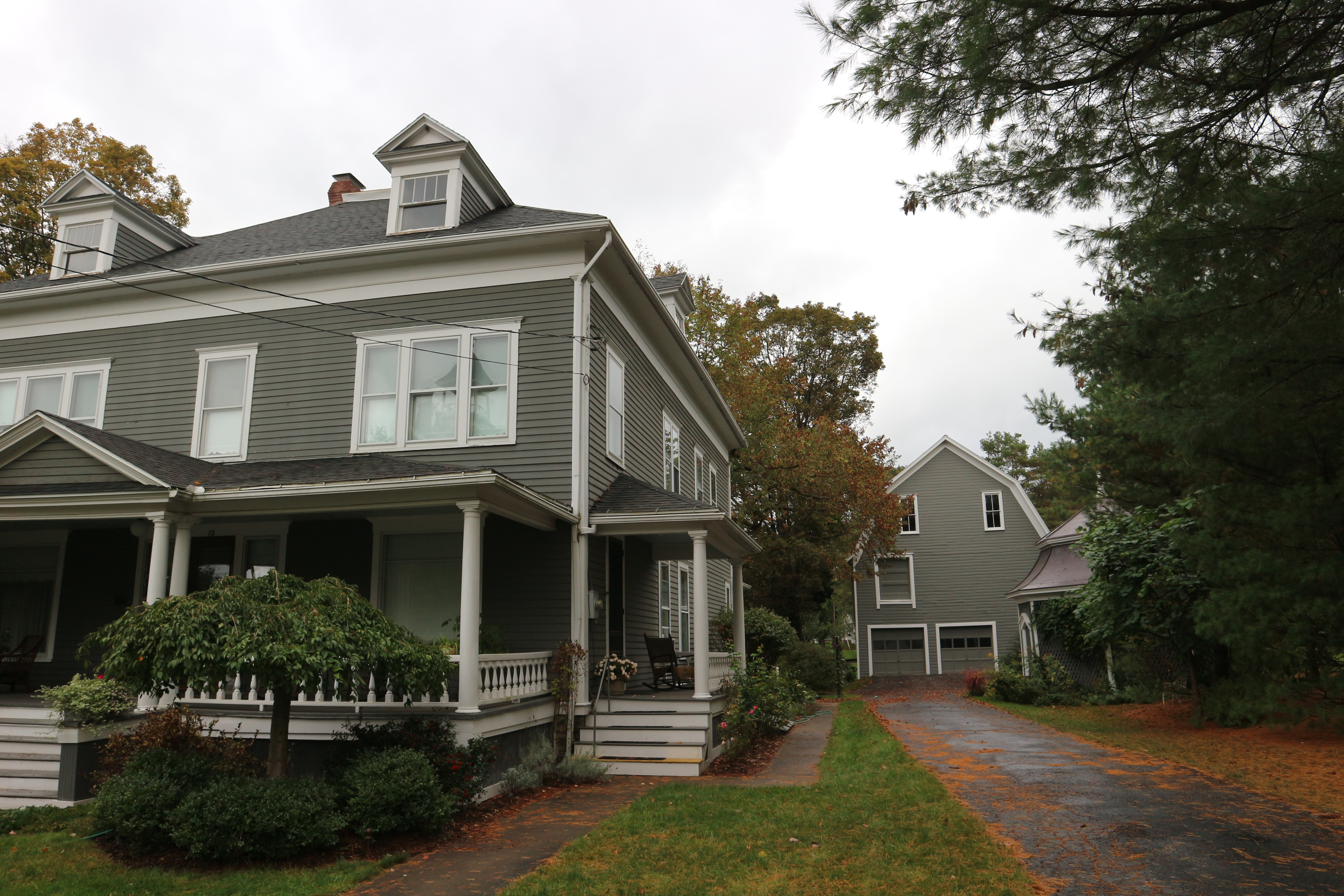
