= Silk Street Bridge =

- U.S. National Register of Historic Places
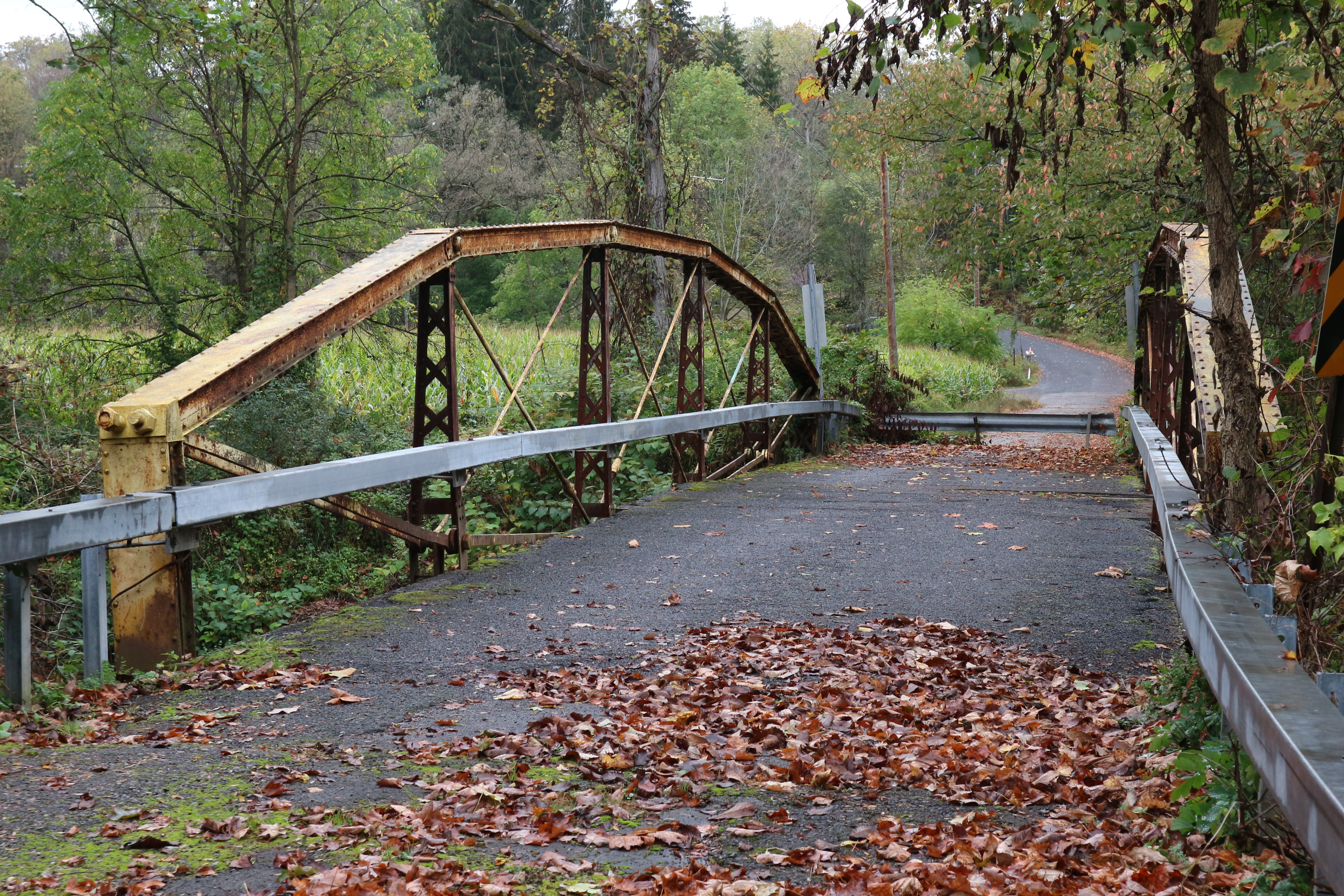

- Location within New York Location within the United States
- Location: Silk Street, over East Branch of Owego Circle, Newark Valley, New York
- Coordinates: 42°13′3″N 76°11′38″W
- Area: less than one acre
- Built: 1888
- Architectural style: lenticular pony truss
- MPS: Newark Valley MPS
- NRHP reference No.: 98000430
- Added to NRHP: April 30, 1998

Silk Street Bridge is a historic Lenticular pony truss bridge located at Newark Valley in Tioga County, New York. It was constructed in 1888 and spans the East Branch of Owego Creek. It was constructed by the Berlin Iron Bridge Company of East Berlin, Connecticut. The bridge is currently closed to traffic.

It was listed on the National Register of Historic Places in 1998.

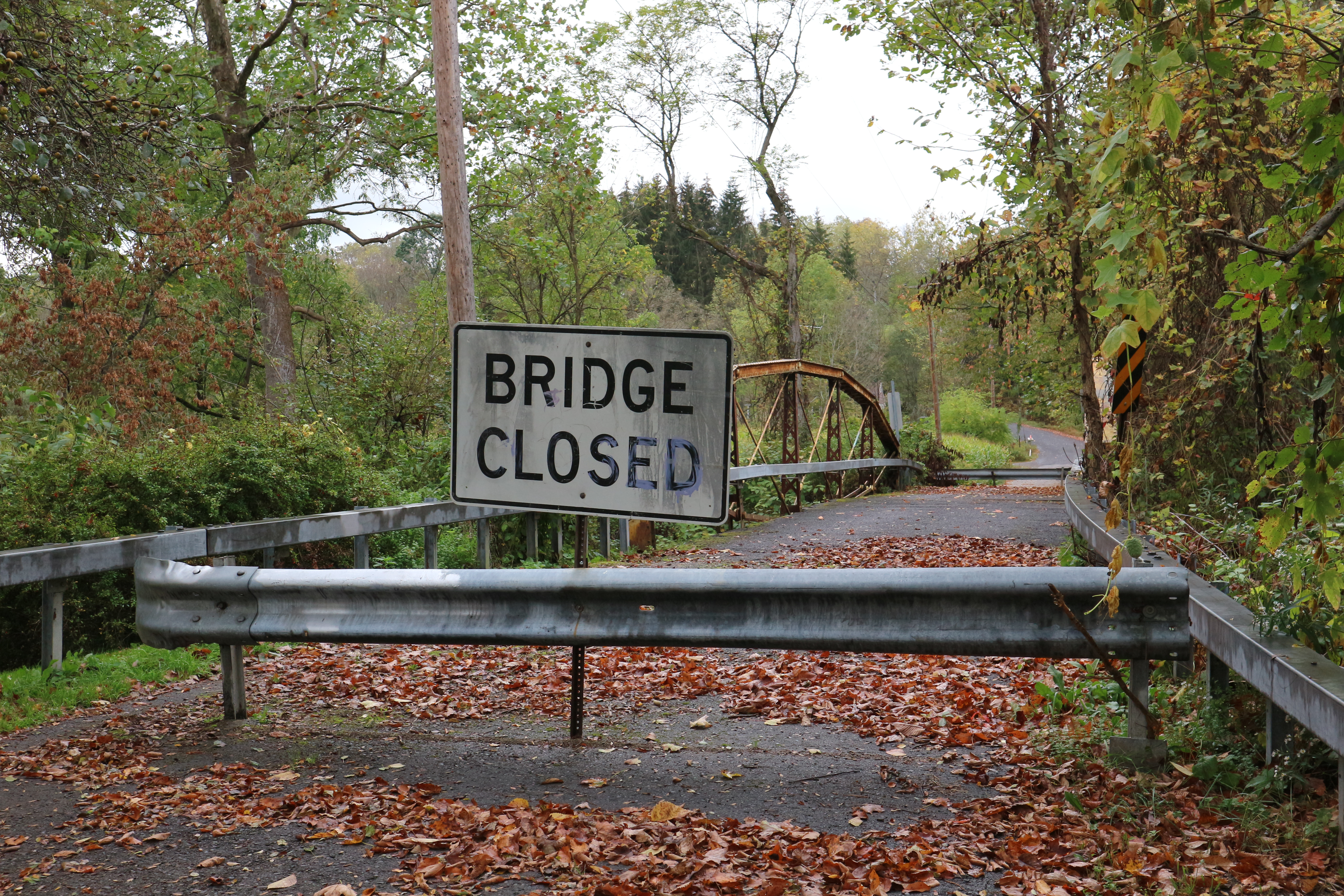
