= Marlborough Building =

Historic commercial building in New York, United States

- U.S. National Register of Historic Places
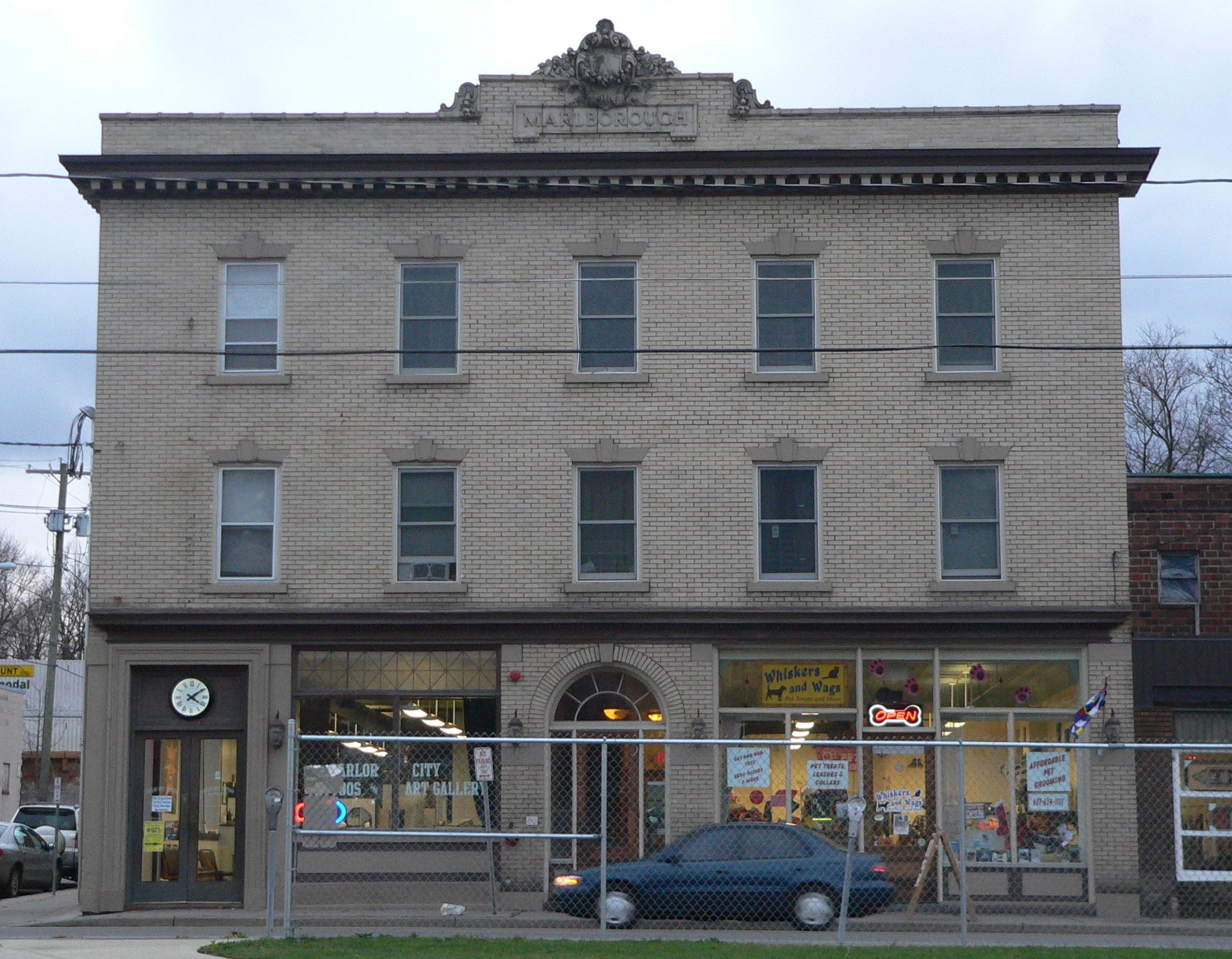
- Marlborough Building, seen from across Clinton Street

- Location within New York Location within the United States
- Interactive map showing the Marlborough Building’s location
- Location: 81 Clinton St., Binghamton, New York
- Coordinates: 42°6′25″N 75°55′20″W
- Built: 1914
- Architect: T. I. Lacey & Son
- Architectural style: Late 19th and 20th Century Revivals
- NRHP reference No.: 08000036
- Added to NRHP: February 19, 2008

Marlborough Building, also known as Marlborough Hotel, State Bank of Binghamton, State Hotel, and Marble Grill, is a historic building located at Binghamton in Broome County, New York. It was built in 1914 and is a three-story, five bay commercial building with a one-story addition and upper level stacked porches projecting from the rear. The front facade features a stepped parapet with a cast cartouche ornamented with foliage flanked by decorative cast stone foliage. It was built as a hotel and housed a bank on its first floor until 1930. From the 1940s to 1990s, the first floor was used for commercial establishments with apartments above.

It was listed on the National Register of Historic Places in 2008.
