= Carbondale Historical Society and Museum =

Organization in Carbondale, Pennsylvania, USA

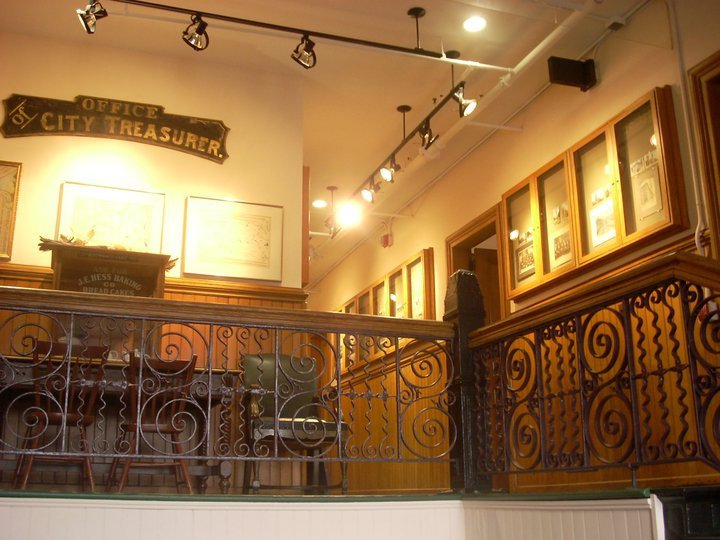
Entrance of the Carbondale Historical Society and Museum.

The Carbondale Historical Society is a local historical society in Carbondale, Pennsylvania, United States. It operates a local history museum on the third floor of the Carbondale City Hall and Courthouse. It has EIN 23-2273752 as a 501(c)(3) Public Charity.

== History ==
The first public meeting of the Historical Society, founded in October 1974 by a group of six Carbondale area school teachers, was held in January 1975.

The Carbondale City Hall building had been in disrepair at this time, and was being considered for demolition and replacement. However, the intrinsic value of the building seemed too great to destroy, for a group of civic-minded individuals which comprised the Committee to Restore Carbondale City Hall. The Committee and the Society were effectively facing the same issues, and members of both organizations thought it best to consolidate into one entity.

On November 6, 1982, the Historical Society and the Committee to Restore Carbondale City Hall merged to form the Carbondale Historical Society and Museum, which was incorporated on March 15, 1983. The Carbondale Historical Society and Museum is an educational and historical membership organization whose mission is to record, gather, and preserve the history of the city of Carbondale and the surrounding area.

== Today ==
Through its genealogical and local history research center and exhibition galleries on the third floor of Carbondale City hall (listed in the National Register of Historic Places on January 6, 1983, through the efforts of the Society) and through an annual series of public lectures, programs, exhibitions, and commemorative ceremonies, in the community and in the public schools, the Society, at the same time, interprets and makes accessible to the public Carbondale's history and heritage.

== Museum ==
Among the most important accomplishments of the Historical Society was the establishment of a professionally organized and managed museum of local history and genealogy. The museum's collections are especially rich in two areas: anthracite coal mining and railroad history, especially that of the Delaware and Hudson railroad. So extensive have the railroad holdings of the Society become, that a specific section of its holdings has been designated as a Delaware and Hudson transportation museum.

Given the broad range of artifacts that relate to local history, from the nineteenth century and early twentieth century, the Society has established, a Victorian parlour as the context for the exhibition of many of its holdings.

== Research materials and archives ==
There is an extensive collection of local birth and death records, cemetery records, and church records. All of the newspapers in the holdings of the Society, from the 1820s to the present, have been microfilmed. These microfilms are available for research purposes at the Carbondale Public Library.

== Local History Awards ==
Begun in the 2009–2010 school year, the Society's Local History Awards program has encouraged high school juniors and seniors in area schools to study and participate in the recording of history. In its first and second years, the program was instituted only in the Carbondale Area Junior/Senior High School, but future years may see its spread to other schools.

== See also ==
- List of historical societies in Pennsylvania
