= Hope Cemetery and Mausoleum =

Historic cemetery in New York, United States

- U.S. National Register of Historic Places
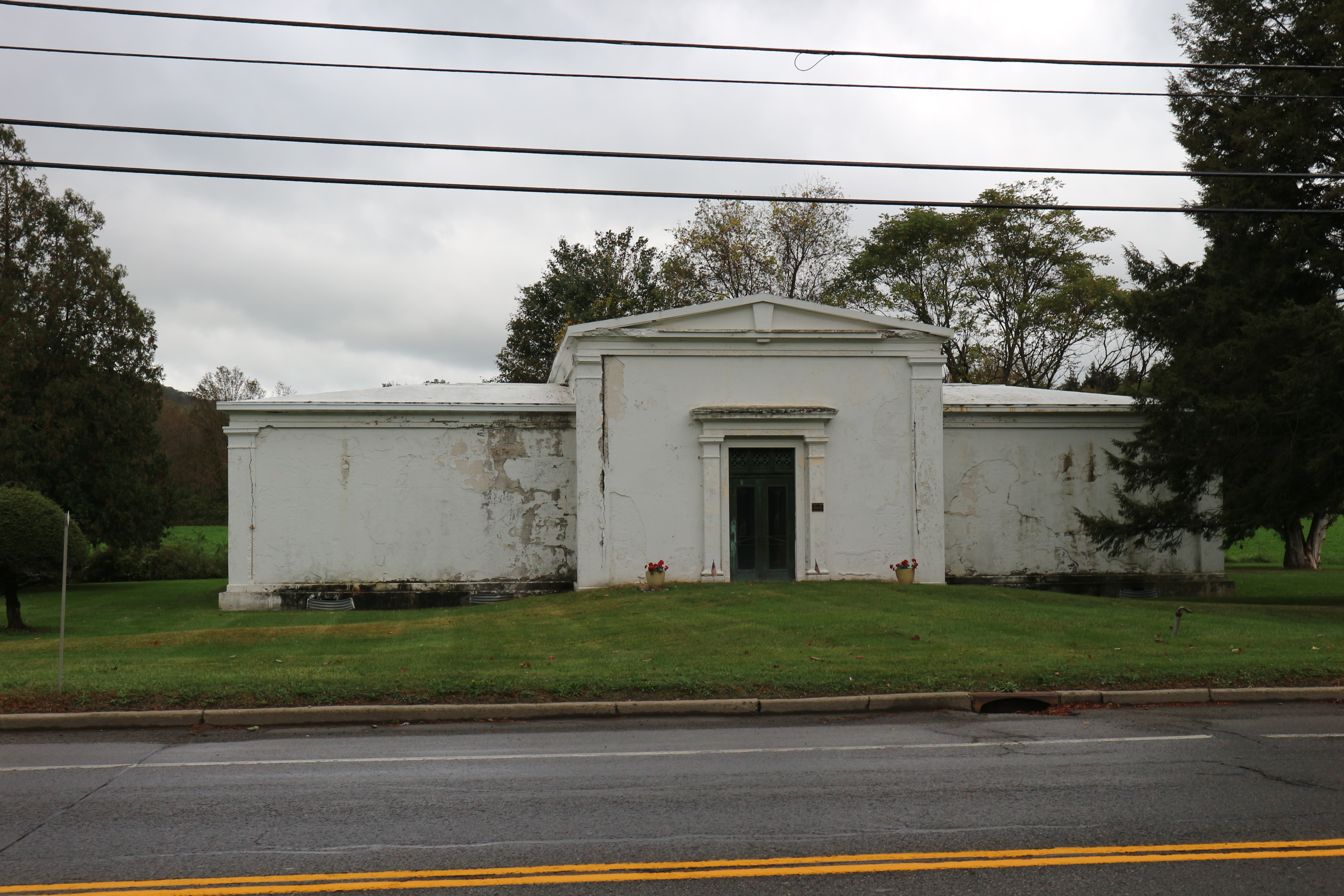

- Location within New York Location within the United States
- Location: Main St., at the town limits, Newark Valley, New York
- Coordinates: 42°12′39″N 76°11′25″W
- Area: 8.2 acres (3.3 ha)
- Built: 1820
- MPS: Newark Valley MPS
- NRHP reference No.: 98000164
- Added to NRHP: March 16, 1998

Hope Cemetery and Mausoleum is a historic cemetery and mausoleum located at Newark Valley in Tioga County, New York. It was established as a community burial ground in 1820 and subsequently expanded through a series of additions made between 1866 and 1931. The mausoleum was built of reinforced concrete in the 1920s in a style strongly reminiscent of Greek Revival architecture. It reportedly contains 200 crypts, plus four private rooms containing an additional 22 crypts.

It was listed on the National Register of Historic Places in 1998.

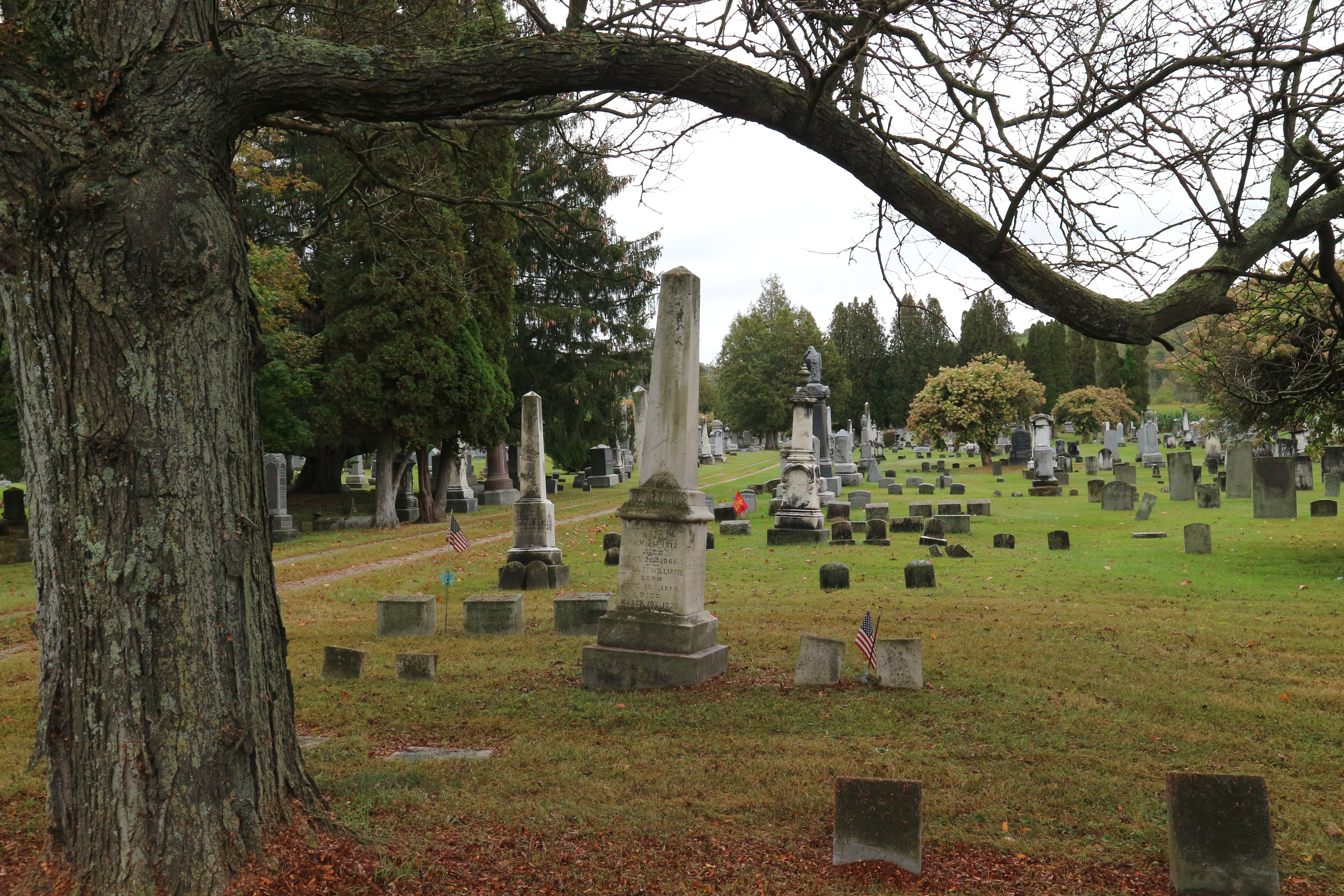
