= Nichols High School =

- U.S. National Register of Historic Places
- New York State Register of Historic Places
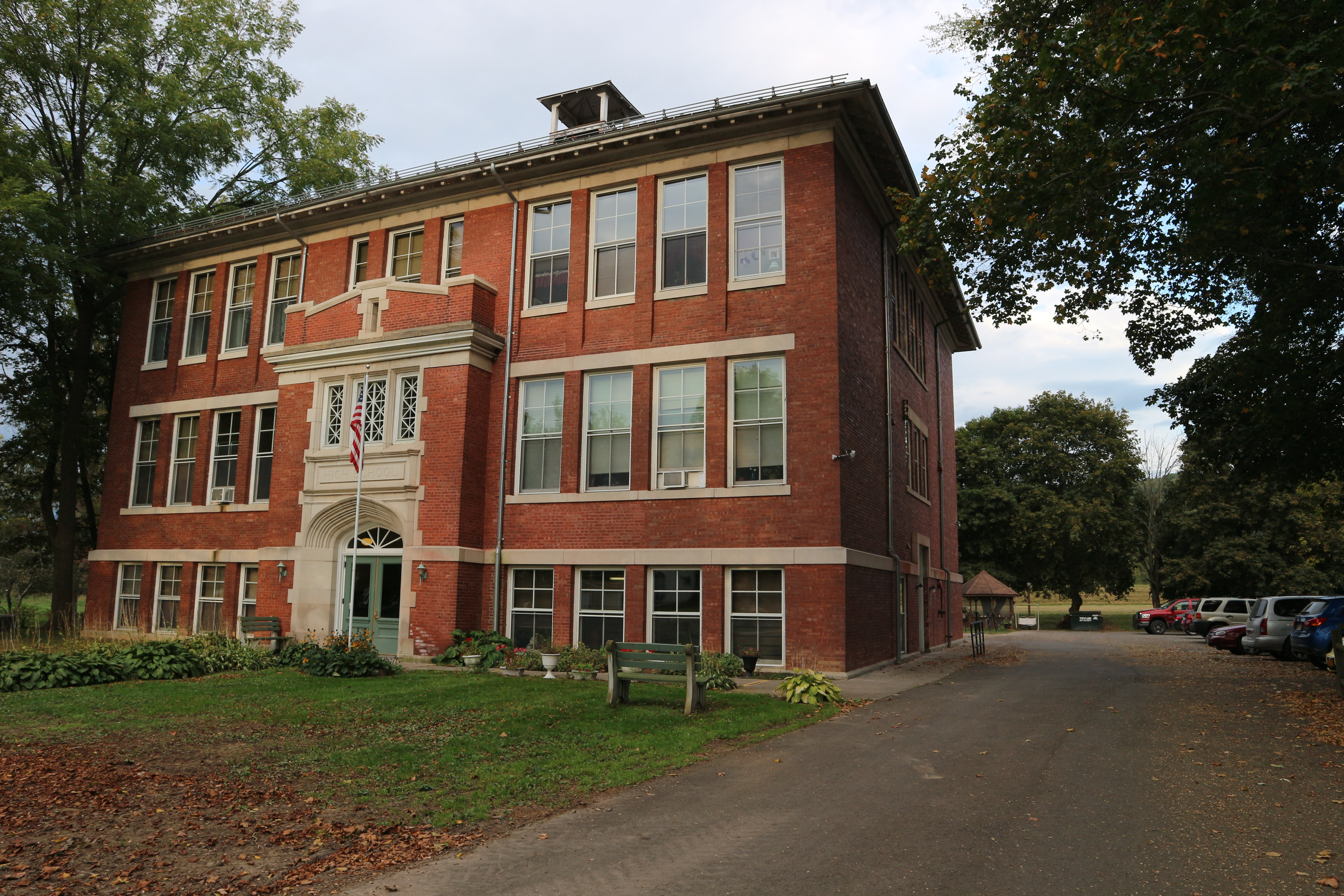

- Location within New York Location within the United States
- Location: 84 Cady Ave., Nichols, New York
- Coordinates: 42°01′14″N 76°21′53″W
- Area: 1 acre (0.40 ha)
- Built: 1912
- Built by: Thomas Maney
- Architect: T. I. Lacey & Son
- Architectural style: Tudor Revival
- NRHP reference No.: 96000553
- NYSRHP No.: 10744.000004

Significant dates
- Added to NRHP: May 16, 1996
- Designated NYSRHP: April 3, 1996

Nichols High School is a historic high school located at Nichols in Tioga County, New York. It is a Tudor Revival style, three-story, rectangular brick structure with limestone trim built in 1911–1912. The hipped roof is topped with a belfry that retains the original school bell. The building was last used as a school in 1958.

The architects were T. I. Lacey & Son of Binghamton and the builder was Thomas Maney. It was listed on the National Register of Historic Places in 1996.
