= Wyalusing Borough Historic District =

- U.S. National Register of Historic Places
- U.S. Historic district
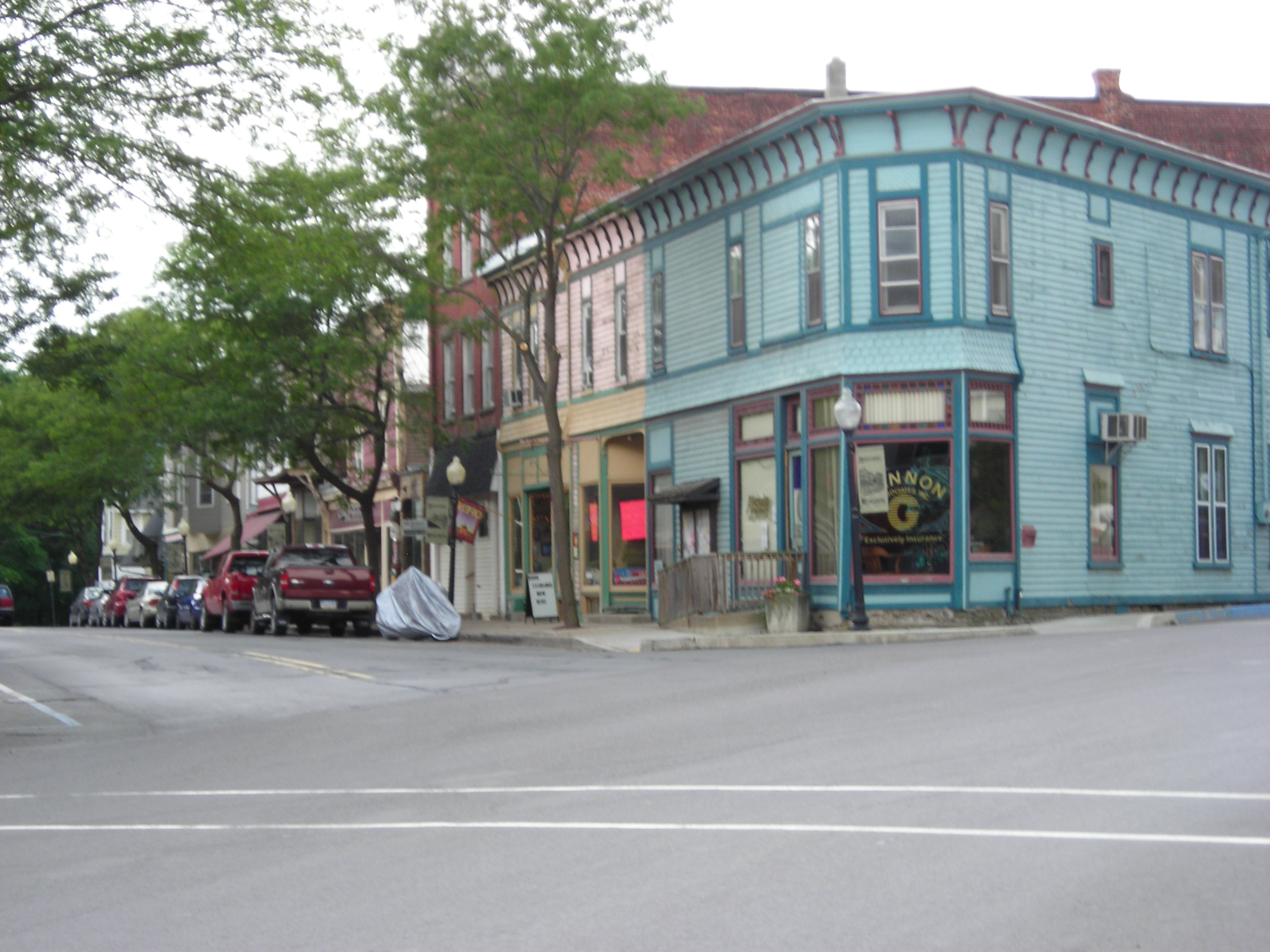
- Wyalusing downtown, July 2012

- Location within Pennsylvania
- Location: Roughly bounded by Prospect, First, Second, Third, Noble Sts., and Taylor Ave., Wyalusing, Pennsylvania
- Coordinates: 41°40′06″N 76°15′43″W
- Area: 177 acres (72 ha)
- Architectural style: Queen Anne, Stick/eastlake, 42
- NRHP reference No.: 03000934
- Added to NRHP: September 15, 2003

The Wyalusing Borough Historic District is a national historic district located at Wyalusing, Pennsylvania. The district includes 168 contributing buildings in a mixed commercial and residential area of Wyalusing. The buildings date between about 1840 and 1930, and include notable examples of Queen Anne style and stick style architecture.

It was added to the National Register of Historic Places in 2003.
