= Newark Valley (village), New York =

Newark Valley
- Village
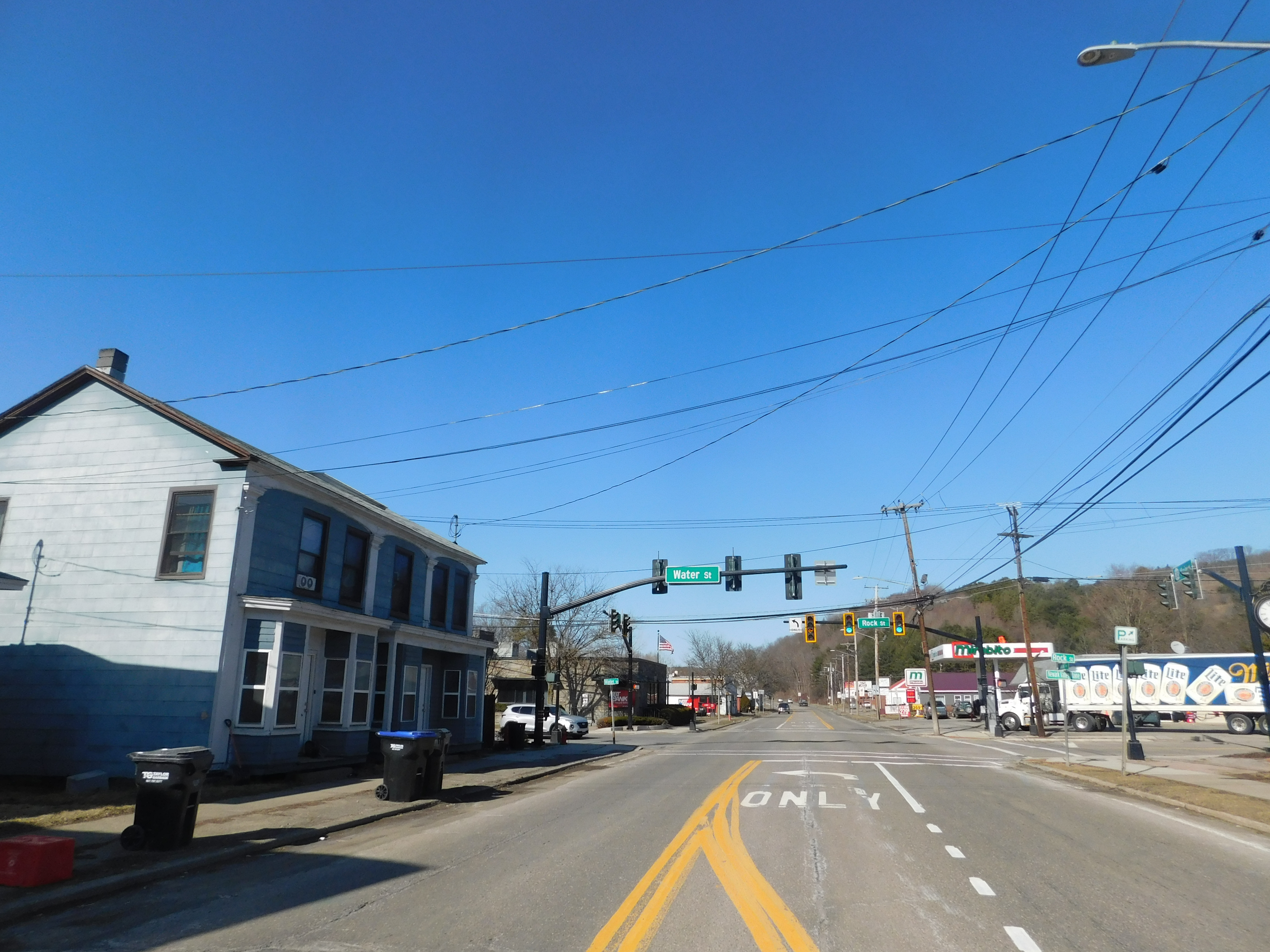
- NY 38 northbound in Newark Valley.

- Location within the state of New York
- Coordinates: 42°13′23″N 76°11′8″W
- Country: United States
- State: New York
- County: Tioga
- Settled: 1791
- Incorporated: September 1894
- Named after: Newark, New Jersey

Area
  - Total: 0.99 sq mi (2.56 km^{2})
  - Land: 0.99 sq mi (2.56 km^{2})
  - Water: 0 sq mi (0.00 km^{2})
- Elevation: 968 ft (295 m)

Population (2020)
  - Total: 928
  - Density: 939.5/sq mi (362.73/km^{2})
- Time zone: UTC-5 (Eastern (EST))
  - Summer (DST): UTC-4 (EDT)
- ZIP code: 13811
- Area code: 607
- FIPS code: 36-49902
- GNIS feature ID: 0958490
- Website: villagenv.com

Newark Valley is a village in Tioga County, New York, United States. The population was 997 at the 2010 census. It is part of the Binghamton Metropolitan Statistical Area. The village is named after the city of Newark, New Jersey.

Newark Valley is in the western part of the Town of Newark Valley and is northwest of Binghamton.

== History ==
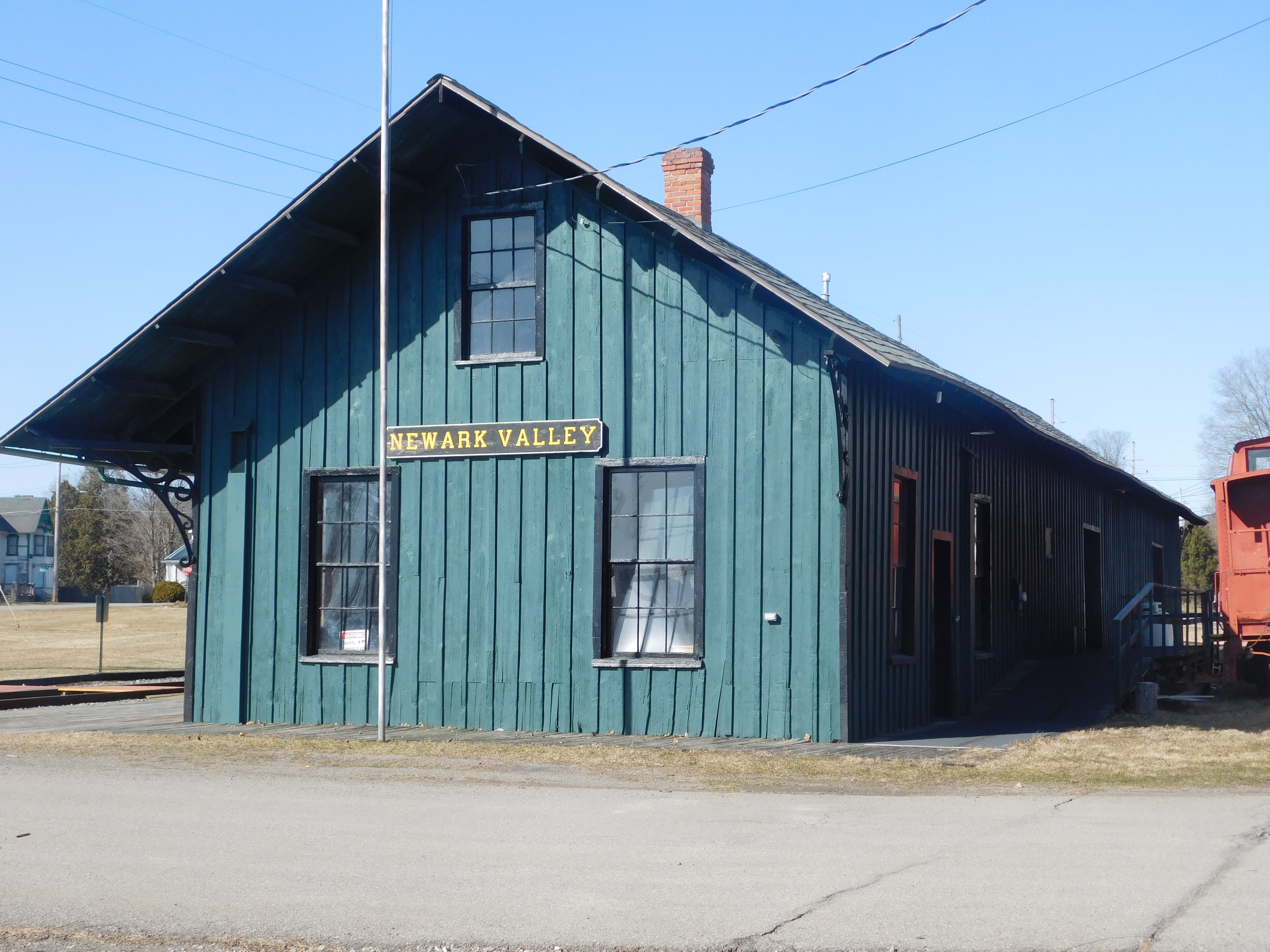
The former Lehigh Valley Railroad station in Newark Valley

The site of the village was first settled around 1792. Although many of the early settlers came from New England, the town name was accepted on a suggestion from someone from New Jersey.

The village of Newark Valley was incorporated in 1894.

The Hope Cemetery and Mausoleum, Knapp House, Newark Valley Municipal Building and Tappan-Spaulding Memorial Library, Nowland House, Gilbert E. Purple House, Silk Street Bridge, and Sutton-Chapman-Howland House are listed on the National Register of Historic Places.

In 2026, the Newark Valley Historical Society hosted the 10th Mountain Division U.S. Army Band to celebrate the 250th anniversary of America's founding.

== Geography ==
According to the United States Census Bureau, the village has a total area of 1.0 square mile (2.5 km^{2}), all land.

The village is in the valley of the East Branch of Owego Creek, on Route 38 (Main Street), north of its junction with NY-38B and south of its junction with County Road 37.

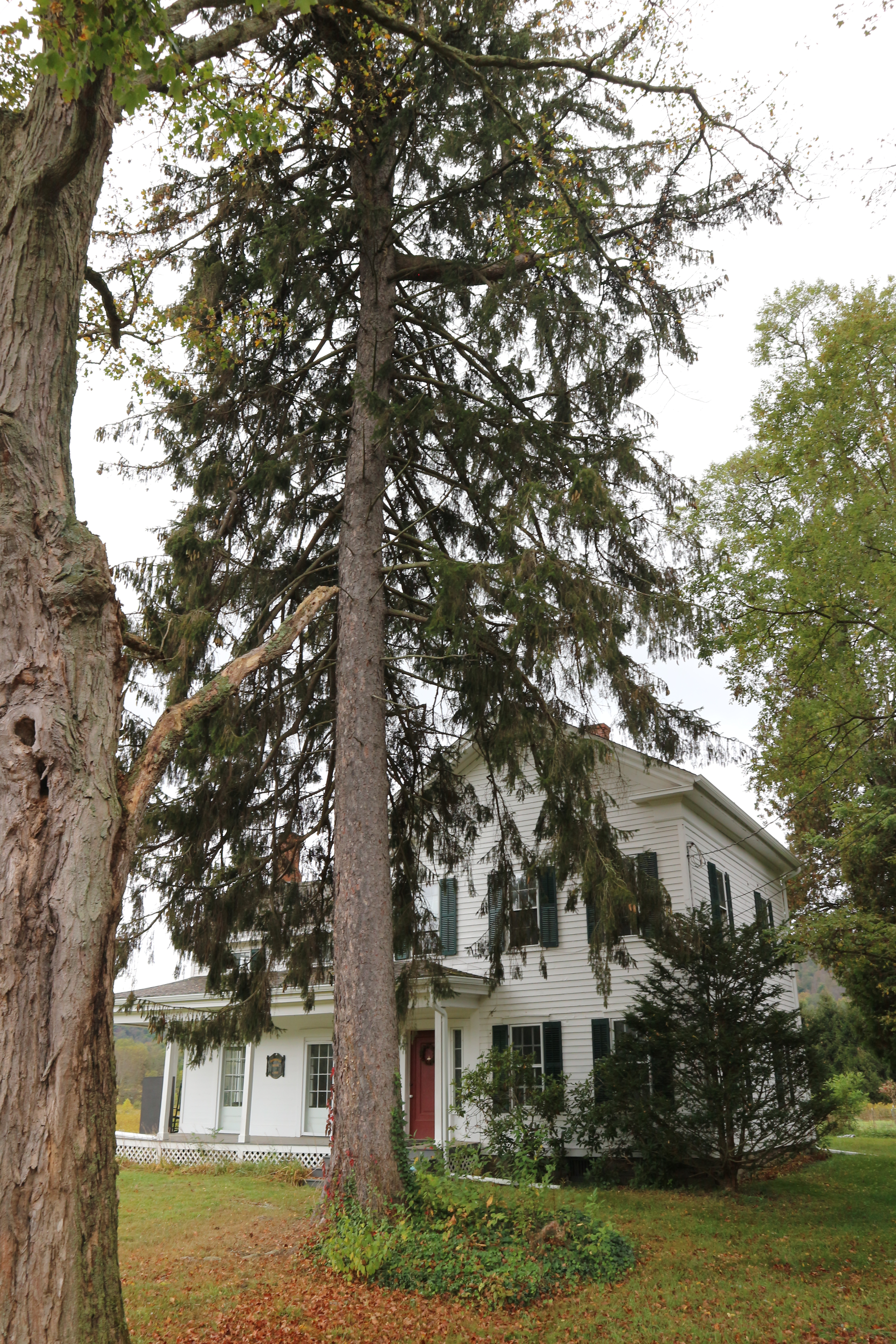
A tree in front of the Daniel Chamberlain House

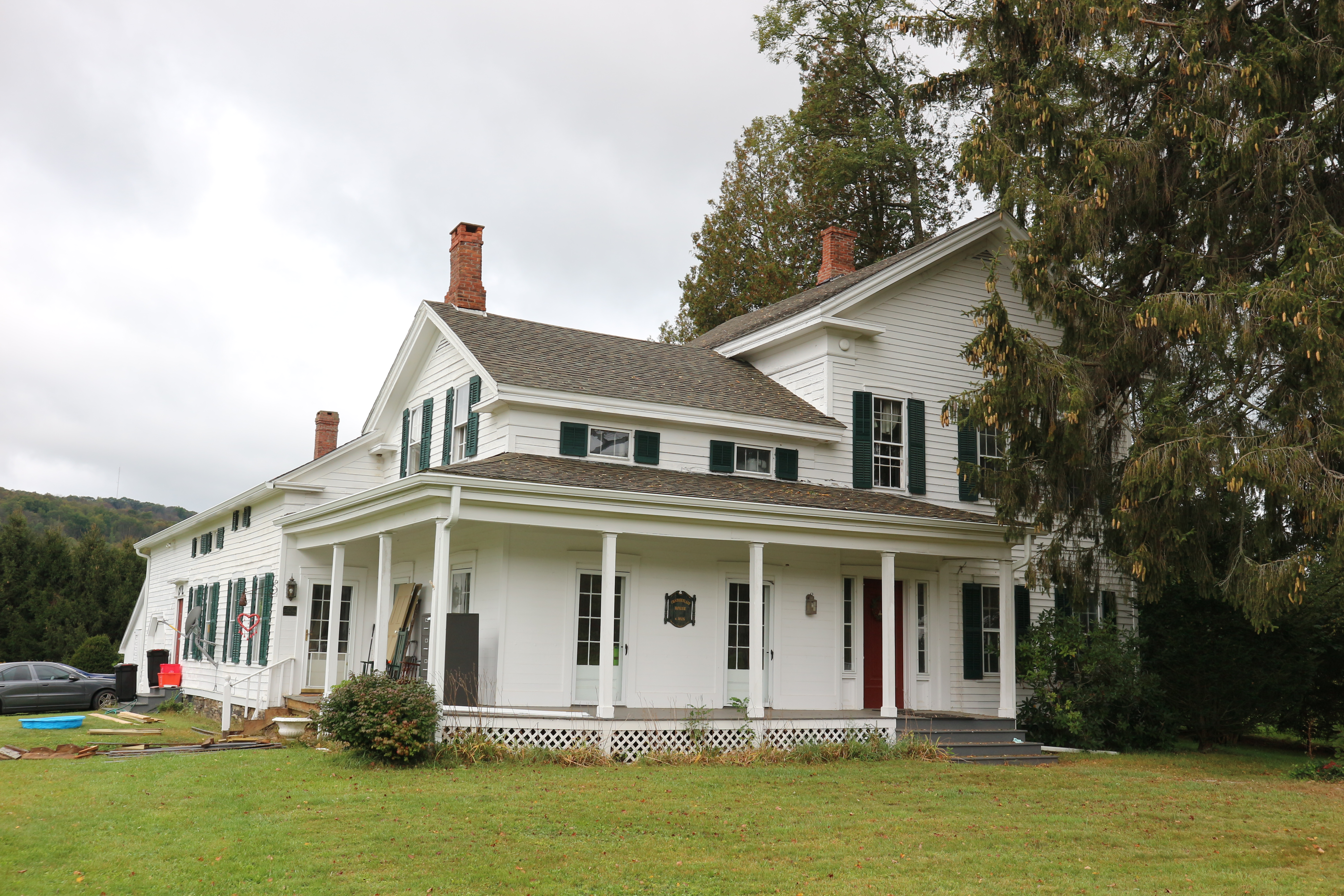
Daniel Chamberlain House

== Demographics ==
Historical population
Census	Pop.	Note	%±
1890	875		—
1900	818		−6.5%
1910	925		13.1%
1920	821		−11.2%
1930	795		−3.2%
1940	949		19.4%
1950	1,027		8.2%
1960	1,234		20.2%
1970	1,286		4.2%
1980	1,190		−7.5%
1990	1,082		−9.1%
2000	1,071		−1.0%
2010	997		−6.9%
2020	928		−6.9%
U.S. Decennial Census

As of the census of 2000, there were 1,071 people, 390 households, and 276 families residing in the village. The population density was 1,096.6 inhabitants per square mile (423.4/km^{2}). There were 446 housing units at an average density of 456.6 per square mile (176.3/km^{2}). The racial makeup of the village was 97.67% White, 0.75% Black or African American, 0.19% Native American, 0.75% from other races, and 0.65% from two or more races. Hispanic or Latino of any race were 1.31% of the population.

There were 390 households, out of which 37.7% had children under the age of 18 living with them, 54.4% were married couples living together, 11.5% had a female householder with no husband present, and 29.2% were non-families. 26.4% of all households were made up of individuals, and 13.3% had someone living alone who was 65 years of age or older. The average household size was 2.58 and the average family size was 3.09.

In the village, the population was spread out, with 29.7% under the age of 18, 7.6% from 18 to 24, 28.6% from 25 to 44, 19.9% from 45 to 64, and 14.3% who were 65 years of age or older. The median age was 36 years. For every 100 females, there were 98.0 males. For every 100 females age 18 and over, there were 93.1 males.

The median income for a household in the village was $37,935, and the median income for a family was $42,604. Males had a median income of $30,750 versus $19,250 for females. The per capita income for the village was $16,919. About 7.7% of families and 12.3% of the population were below the poverty line, including 12.2% of those under age 18 and 9.0% of those age 65 or over.

== Education ==
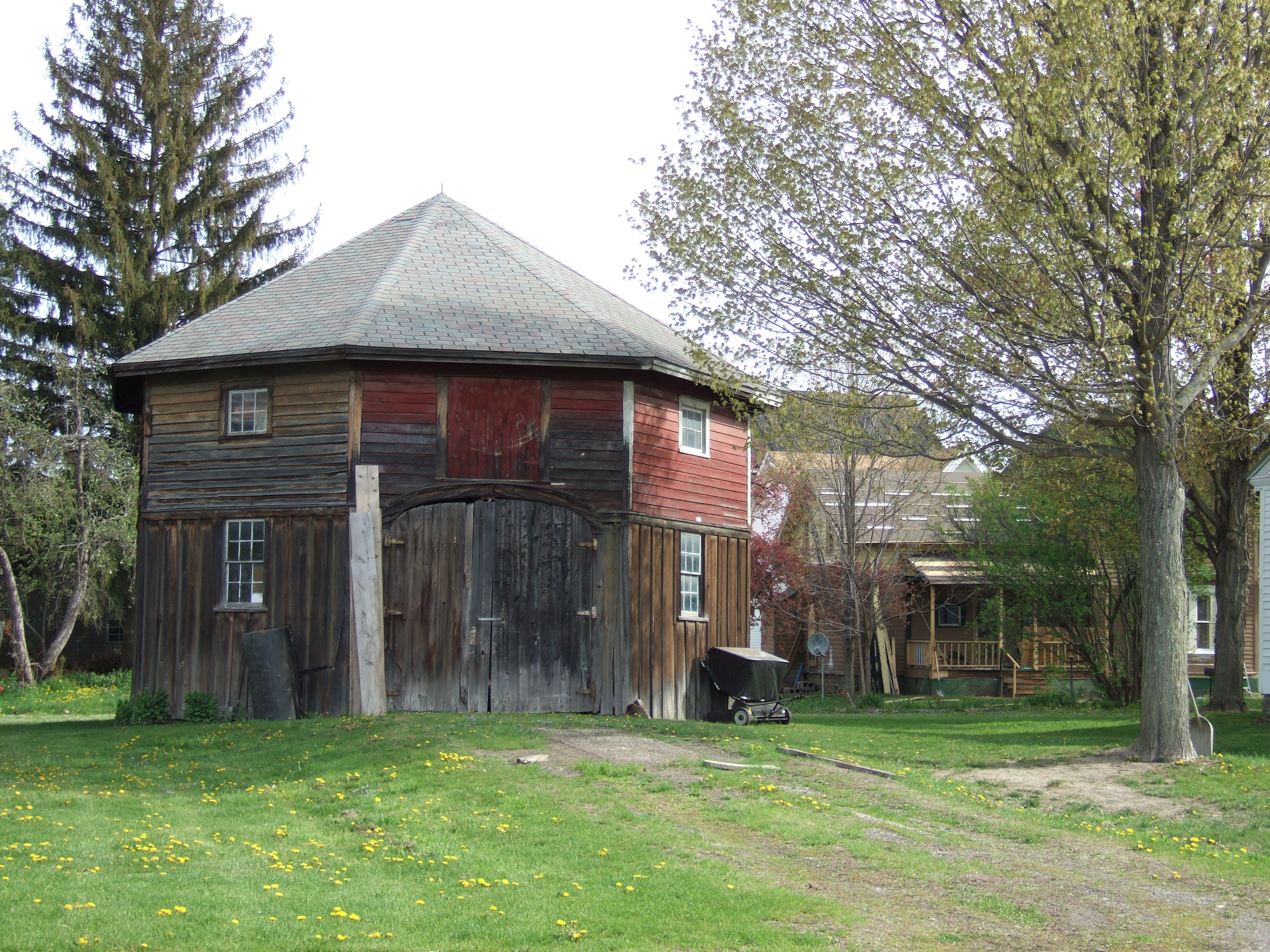
A small home in Newark Valley

Newark Valley is home to Newark Valley Central School District, a public school system composed of an elementary, middle, and senior-high schools. On average, the district graduates 100 seniors a year. Newark Valley High School's mascot is the cardinal.
