= Gilbert E. Purple House =

Historic house in New York, United States

- U.S. National Register of Historic Places
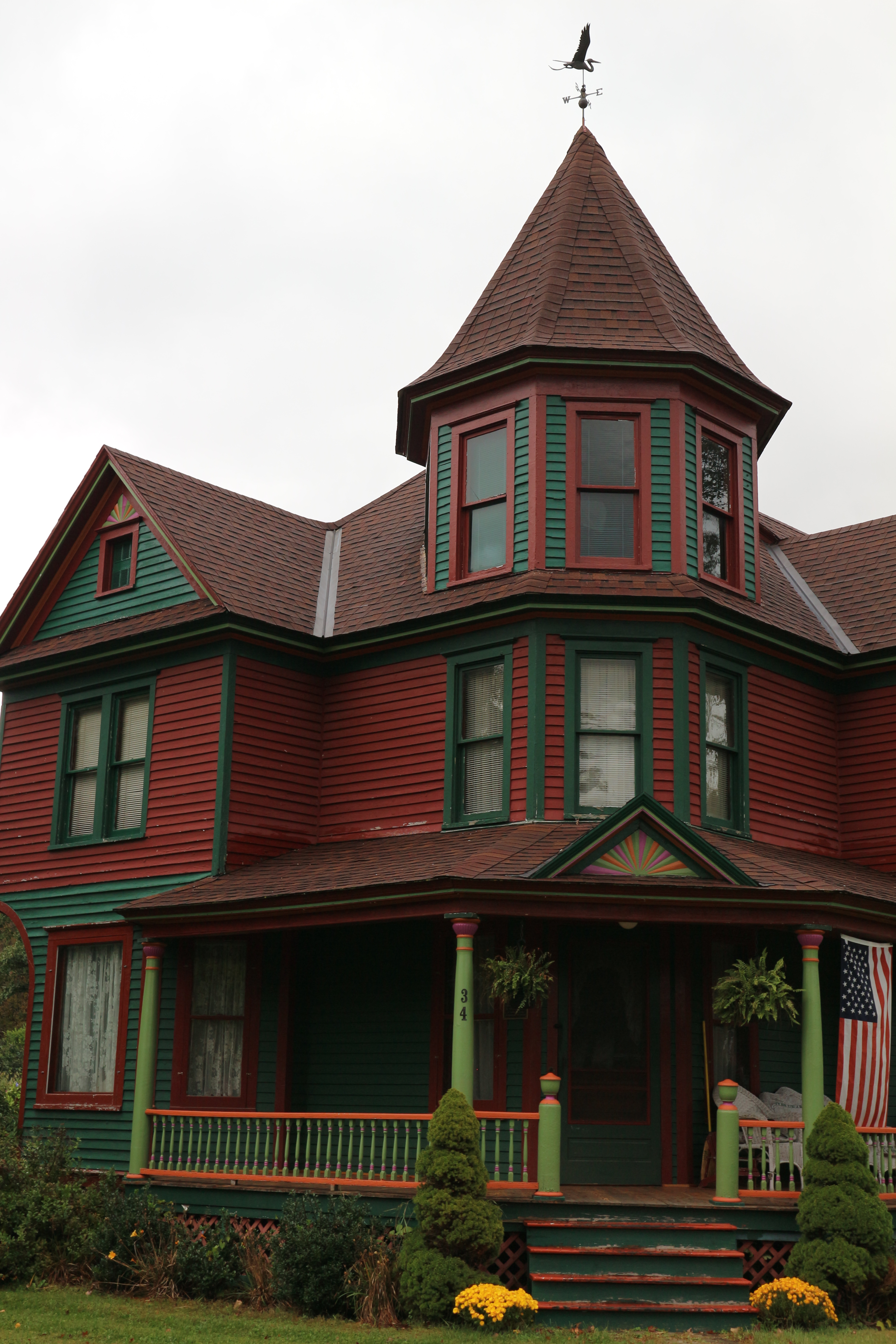

- Location within New York Location within the United States
- Location: 34 Maple Ave., Newark Valley, New York
- Coordinates: 42°13′36″N 76°11′20″W
- Area: less than one acre
- Built: 1913
- Architectural style: Queen Anne
- MPS: Newark Valley MPS
- NRHP reference No.: 04000992
- Added to NRHP: September 15, 2004

Gilbert E. Purple House, also known as Northern Tioga Telephone Company building, is a historic home located at Newark Valley in Tioga County, New York. It was built in 1903 and purchased by Gilbert Purple in 1911, who expanded it to its present form in 1913. It is a modest 2 1/2-story Queen Anne style wood-frame building on a stone and concrete foundation. A large 2-story addition was completed about 1930 for use by the telephone company. By the mid-20th century, the building served dual purpose as residence and offices of the Northern Tioga Telephone Company, a small, independent local telephone company.

It was listed on the National Register of Historic Places in 2004.

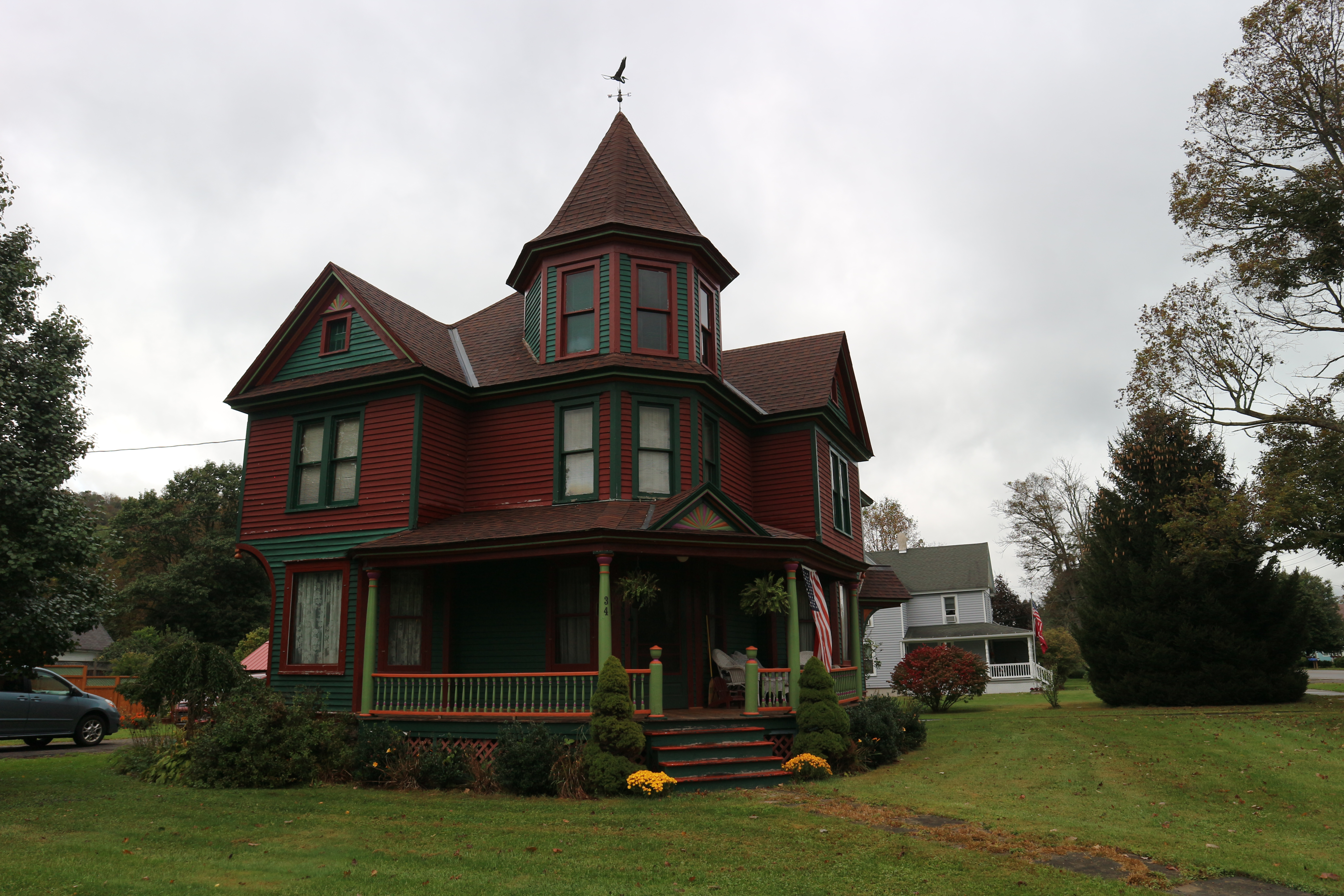
