= Your Home Library =

- Your Home Public Library
- U.S. National Register of Historic Places
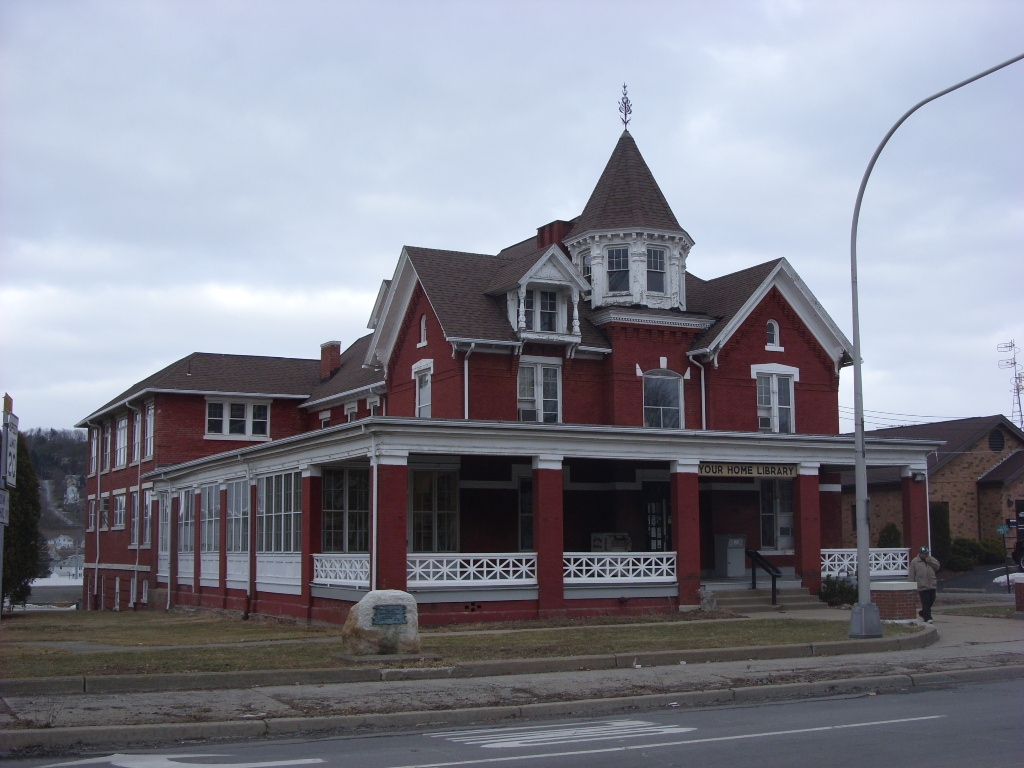
- Your Home Public Library, February 2009

- Location within New York Location within the United States
- Location: 107 Main St., Johnson City, New York
- Coordinates: 42°6′47″N 75°56′59″W
- Area: 0.4 acres (0.16 ha)
- Built: 1885
- Architect: Truman I. Lacey
- Architectural style: Late Victorian
- NRHP reference No.: 05001138
- Added to NRHP: October 05, 2005

Your Home Public Library is a historic library building located at Johnson City in Broome County, New York. Originally the Brigham Homestead built in 1850 by Elijah Brigham, the building was replaced with a Late Victorian style building created as a residence in 1885. In 1917, it was converted for use as a library. The original section of the building is two and one half stories and constructed of brick with a stone foundation, concrete and cast stone water tables, sills, lintels, and band courses. The design features projecting and recessed pavilions, a complex multi-gabled roof, a projecting dormer, and a turret with conical roof and tall weathervane. A large wing was added in 1920. Your Home Library was developed by Harry L. Johnson, brother of George F. Johnson (1857–1948), founder of Endicott-Johnson Shoe Company.

It was listed on the National Register of Historic Places in 2005.
