= Maplelawn (disambiguation) =

Maplelawn is a historic house in Canada.

Maplelawn or Maple Lawn may also refer to:

- Maplelawn Farmstead, in Boone County, Indiana
- Maple Lawn, Fulton, Maryland, a land development
- Maple Lawn, Balmville, New York
- Maple Lawn Farm, Newark Valley, New York
- Owen-Cox House or Maplelawn, Brentwood, Tennessee
