= Daniel Chamberlain =

Daniel Chamberlain is the name of:

- Daniel Henry Chamberlain (1835–1907), 76th Governor of South Carolina
- Daniel R. Chamberlain, President of Houghton College (1976–2006)
- Dan Chamberlain (born 1937), American football player

== See also ==
- Daniel Chamberlain House
