= Belcher-Holden Farm =

Historic house in New York, United States

- U.S. National Register of Historic Places
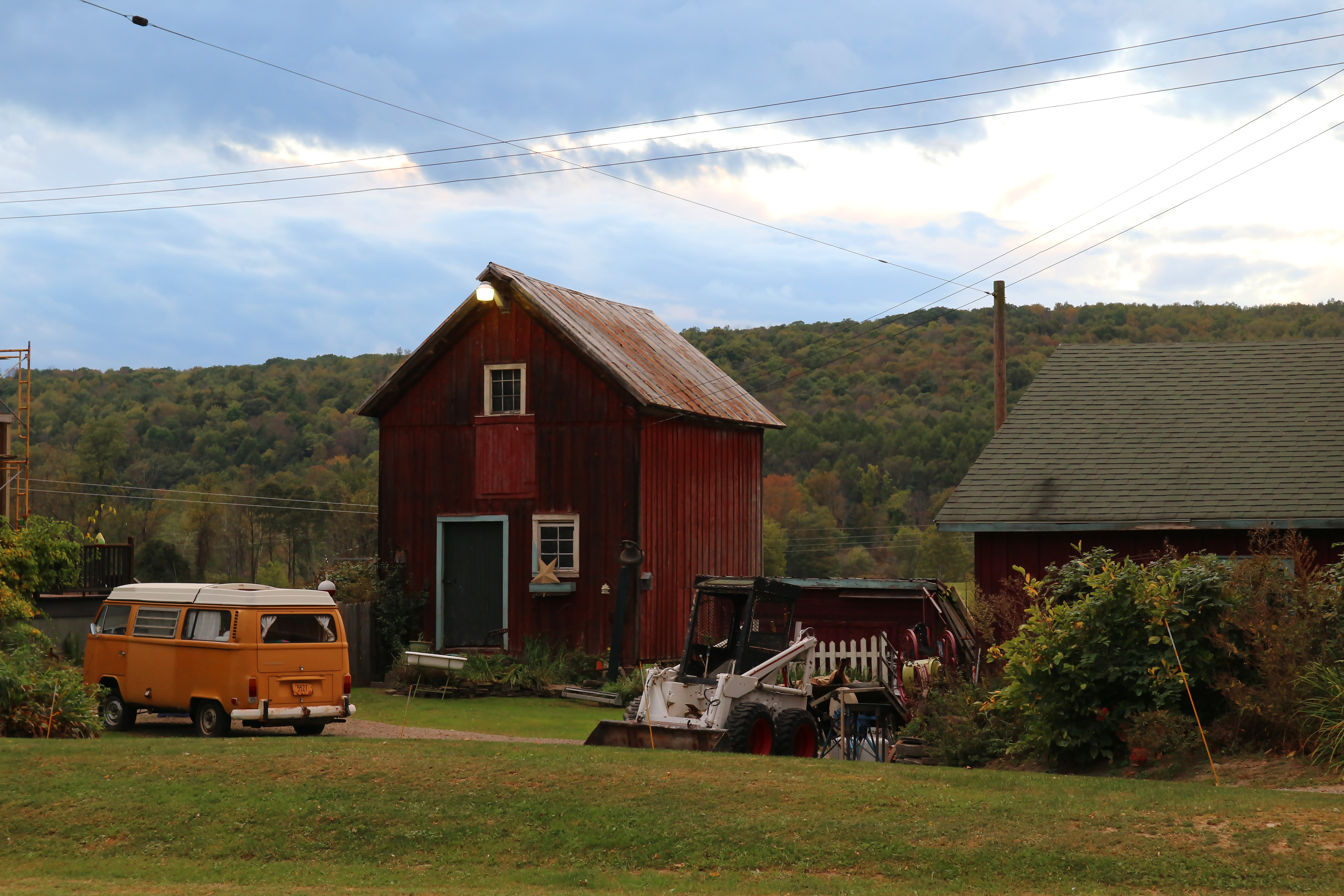

- Location within New York Location within the United States
- Location: 5825 NY 38, Newark Valley, New York
- Coordinates: 42°11′28″N 76°12′17″W
- Area: 5.7 acres (2.3 ha)
- Built: 1810
- Architectural style: Early Republic, Federal
- MPS: Newark Valley MPS
- NRHP reference No.: 97001486
- Added to NRHP: December 15, 1997

Belcher-Holden Farm is a historic home and farm complex located at Newark Valley in Tioga County, New York. The house is a two-story structure composed of a front gabled block on the north, a large gabled wing on the south, and a long woodshed addition on the southwest corner of the side-gabled wing. It was built between about 1810 and 1820 and features delicate Federal carving in the front entrance. The farm complex consists of a barn (1898), silo (ca. 1920–1950), granary (ca. 1870–1900), and chicken coop (ca. 1920-1950s).

It was listed on the National Register of Historic Places in 1997.
