= Farrand-Pierson House =

Historic house in New York, United States

- U.S. National Register of Historic Places
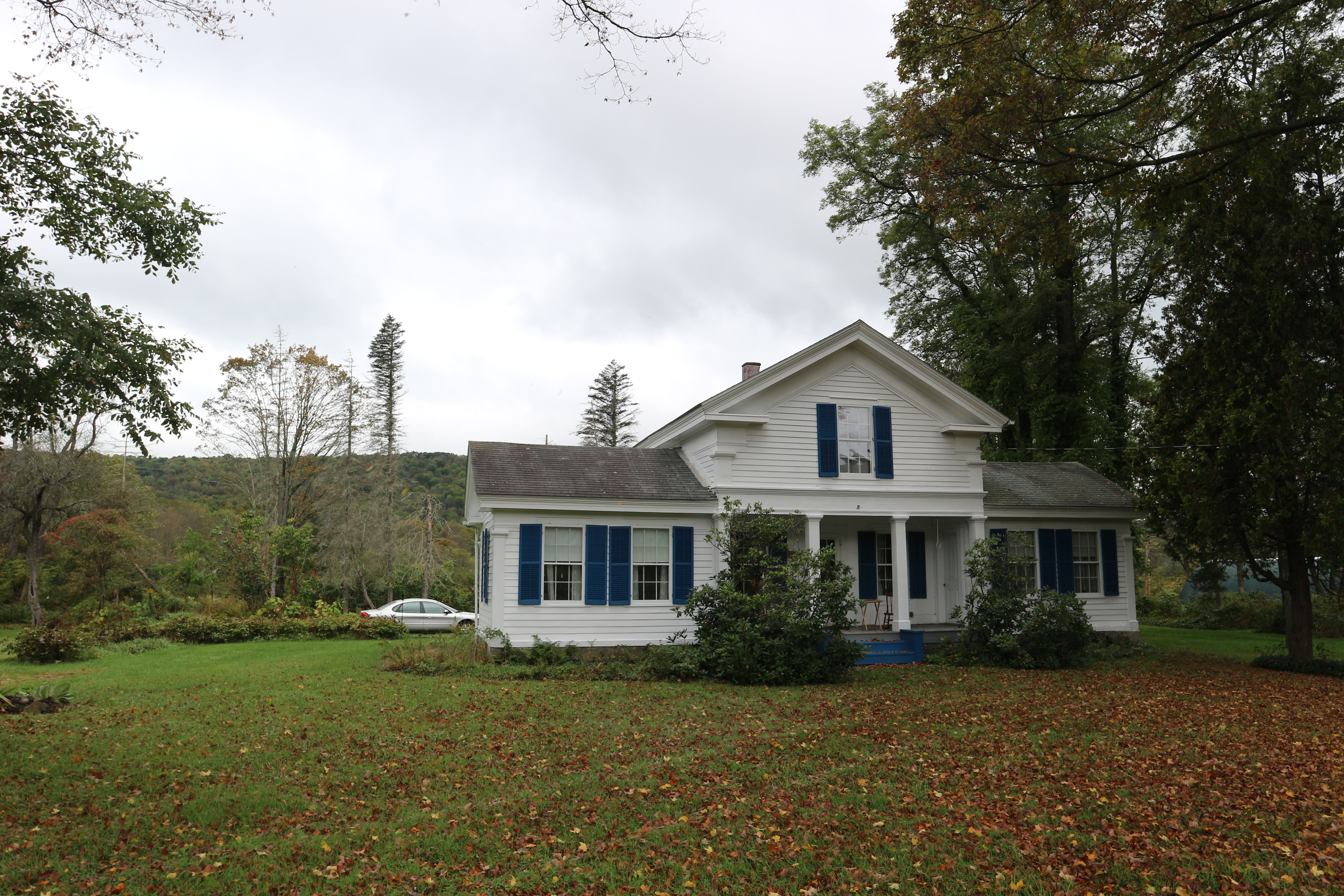

- Location within New York Location within the United States
- Location: 441 Brown Rd., Newark Valley, New York
- Coordinates: 42°16′10″N 76°10′27″W
- Area: 4.5 acres (1.8 ha)
- Built: 1830
- Architectural style: Mid 19th Century Revival, Greek Revival
- MPS: Newark Valley MPS
- NRHP reference No.: 97001490
- Added to NRHP: December 15, 1997

Farrand-Pierson House is a historic home located at Newark Valley in Tioga County, New York. The house is a T-shaped structure. The main section of the house was built about 1860 in the Greek Revival style, while the rear wing appears to incorporate an earlier house dating to about 1830. Also on the property are a small barn, hog house, and chicken house.

It was listed on the National Register of Historic Places in 1997.
