= Bement-Billings House =

Historic house in New York, United States

- U.S. National Register of Historic Places
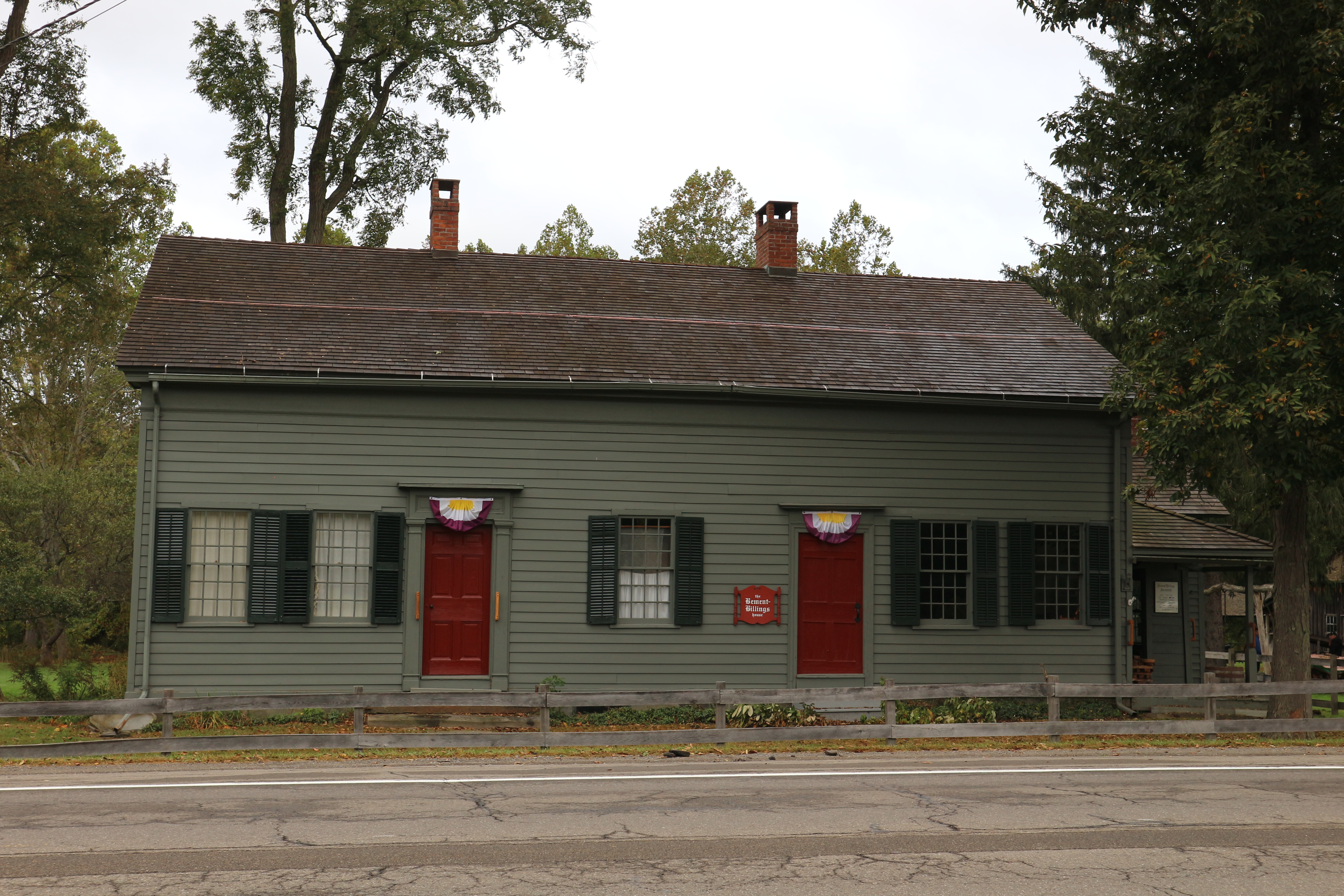

- Location within New York Location within the United States
- Location: NY 38, north of, Newark Valley, New York
- Coordinates: 42°14′10″N 76°10′45″W
- Area: 5 acres (2.0 ha)
- Built: 1796
- Architect: Bement, Asa
- Architectural style: Greek Revival, Federal
- NRHP reference No.: 90000002
- Added to NRHP: February 19, 1990

The Bement-Billings House is a historic house located on NY 38 north of Newark Valley in Tioga County, New York.

== Description and history ==
It is a 1 1/2-story, clapboard farmhouse on a random ashlar stone foundation, exhibiting characteristic features of the Federal and Greek Revival styles. The house began as a one-room cabin, built about 1796, and evolved during the 19th century into the extensive 15-room, 30-by-46-foot (9.1 by 14.0 m) structure that exists today. The house underwent extensive renovation in 1977. Also on the property is a contributing privy.

The house was listed on the National Register of Historic Places on February 19, 1990.

The house is now the centerpiece of the Bement-Billings Farmstead Museum and is owned and operated by the Newark Valley Historical Society. The museum includes the mid-19th century period house, a reconstructed blacksmith shop, a threshing barn, wood shop, carriage shed, and welcome center. Open seasonally on weekends, tours and craft demonstrations are provided by costumed docents.

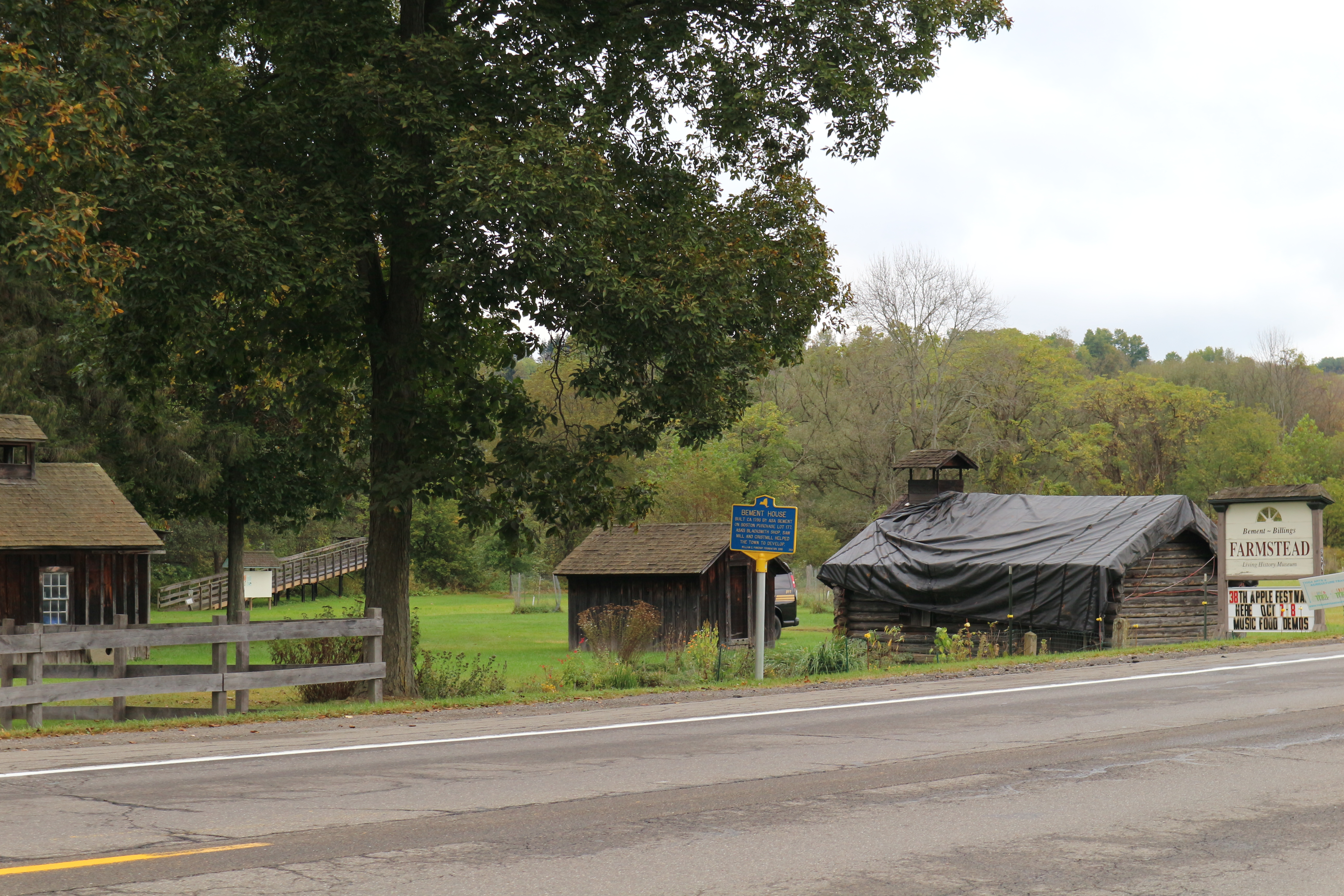

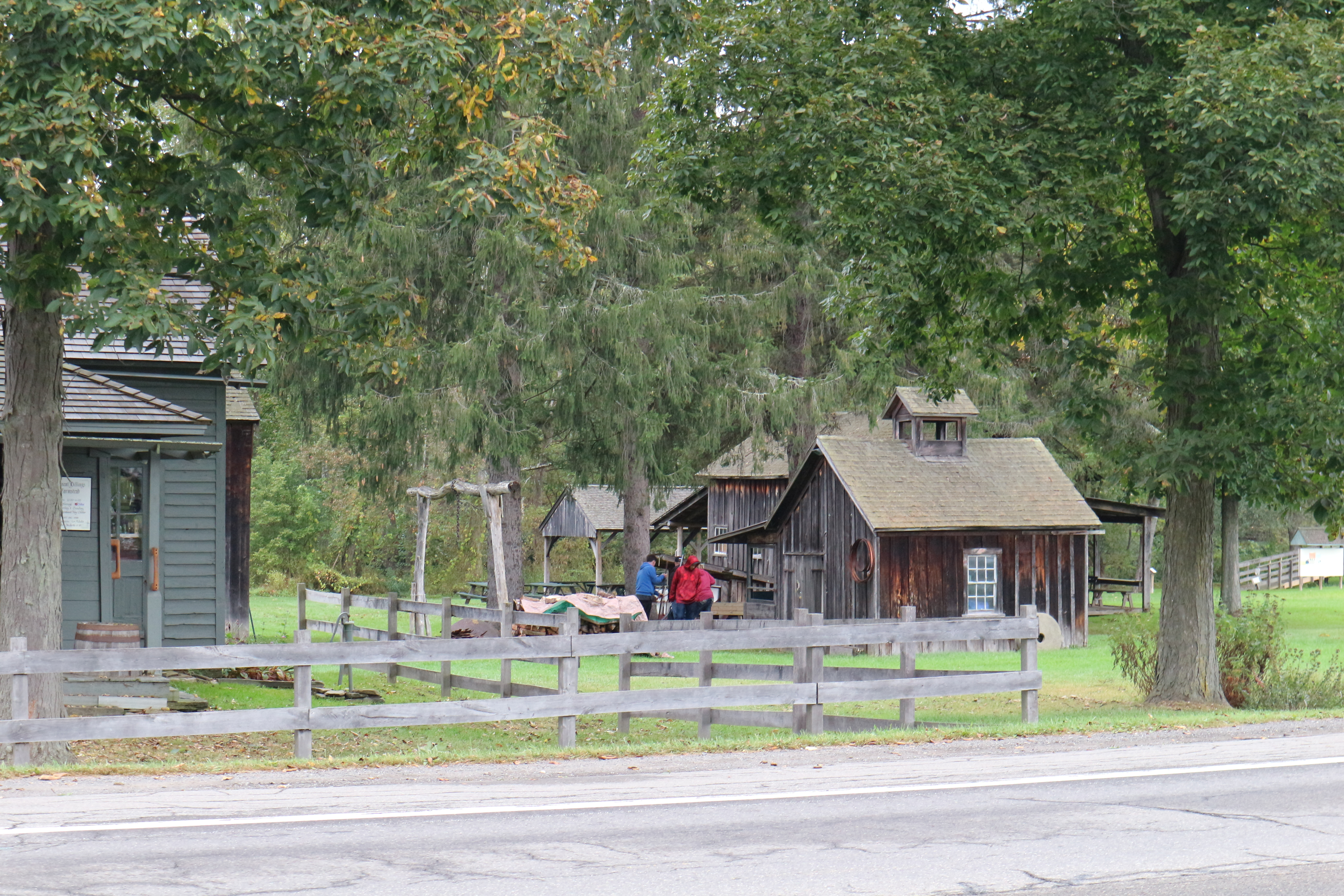
