= Wade Farm =

Historic house in New York, United States

- U.S. National Register of Historic Places
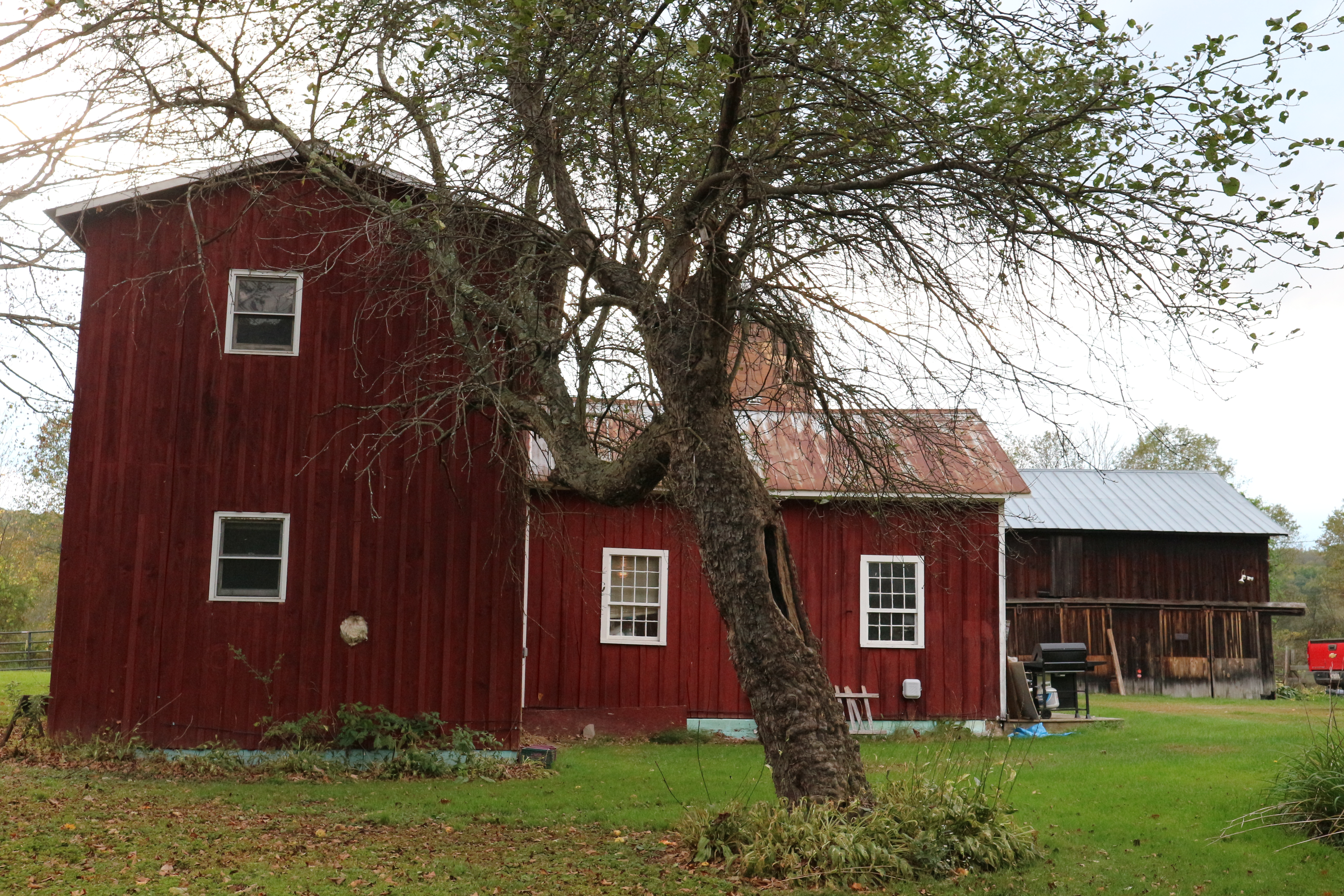

- Location within New York Location within the United States
- Location: 5579 NY 38, Newark Valley, New York
- Coordinates: 42°11′17″N 76°12′34″W
- Area: 20.1 acres (8.1 ha)
- Built: ca. 1822
- Architectural style: Early Republic, Federal
- MPS: Newark Valley MPS
- NRHP reference No.: 97001491
- Added to NRHP: December 15, 1997

Wade Farm is a historic home and farm complex located at Newark Valley in Tioga County, New York. The main house is two story, side gabled frame house was constructed around 1822 in the Federal style. It also feature two smaller wings - a one-story kitchen wing and a small wellhouse addition. The property includes several other buildings, such as English barn secondary barn, granary, chicken house, milk house, and silo. The Farm was named after Lewis Wade, a farmer who purchased the farm in 1833.

It was listed on the National Register of Historic Places in 1997.

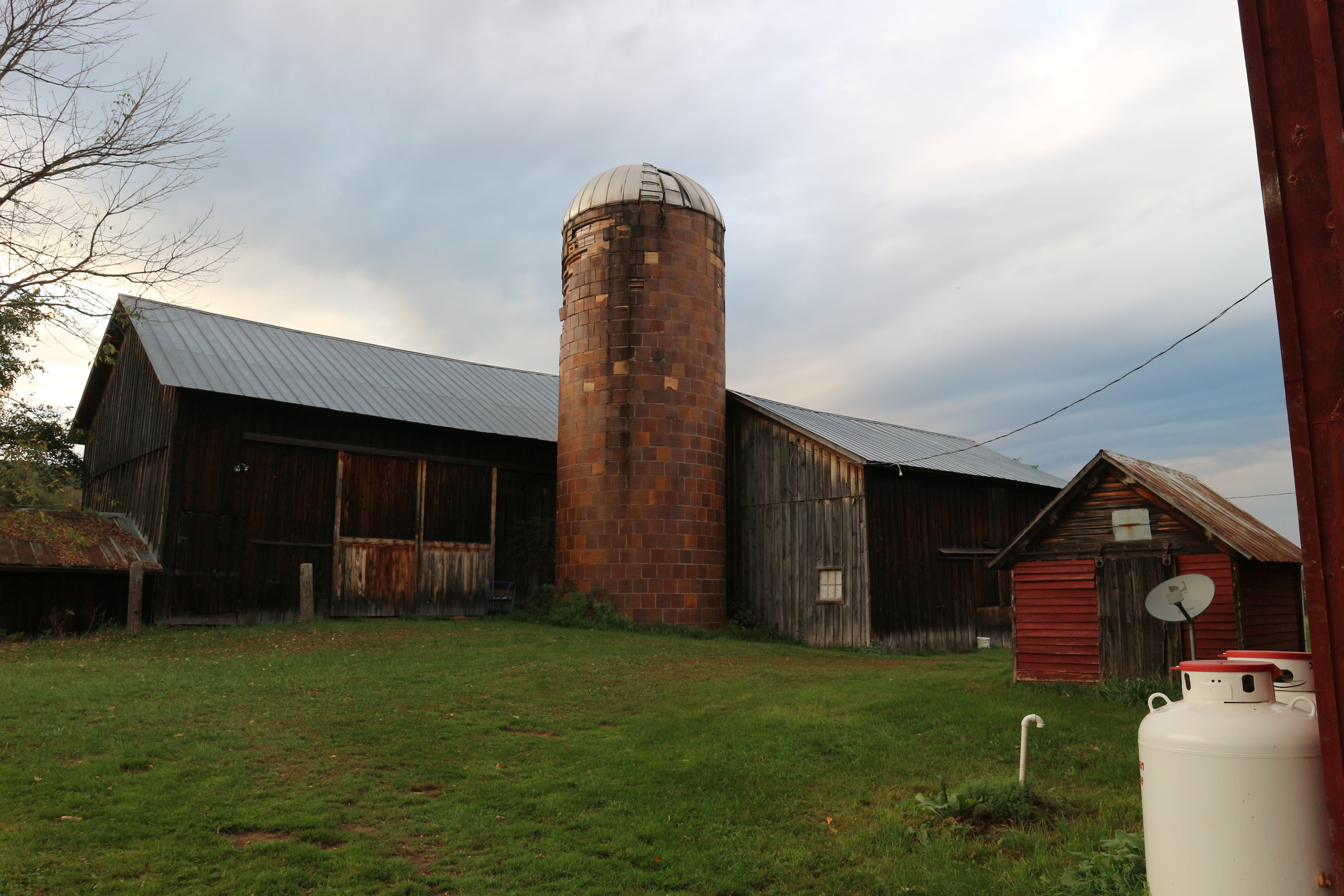

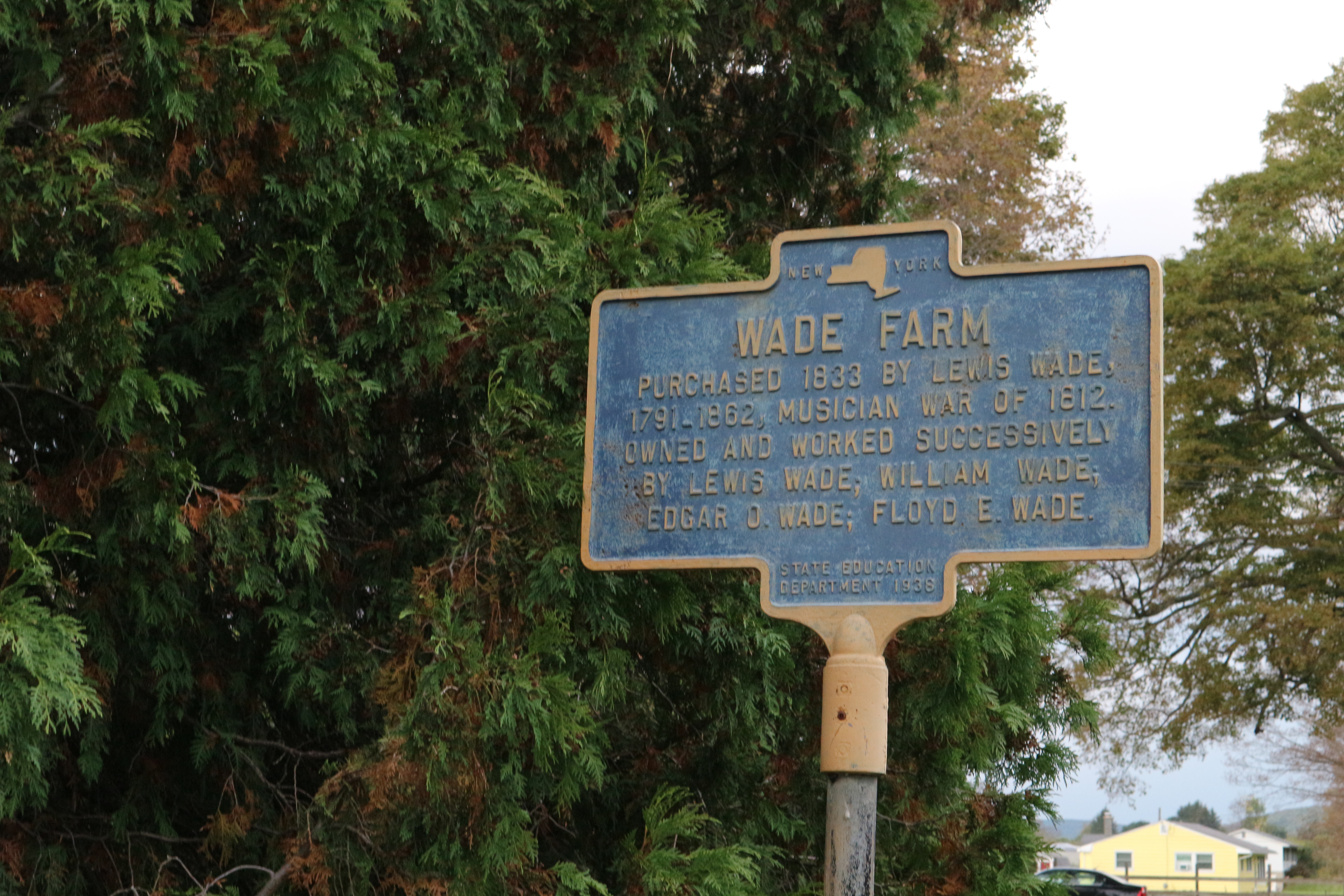
