= Lipe Farm =

Historic house in New York, United States

- U.S. National Register of Historic Places
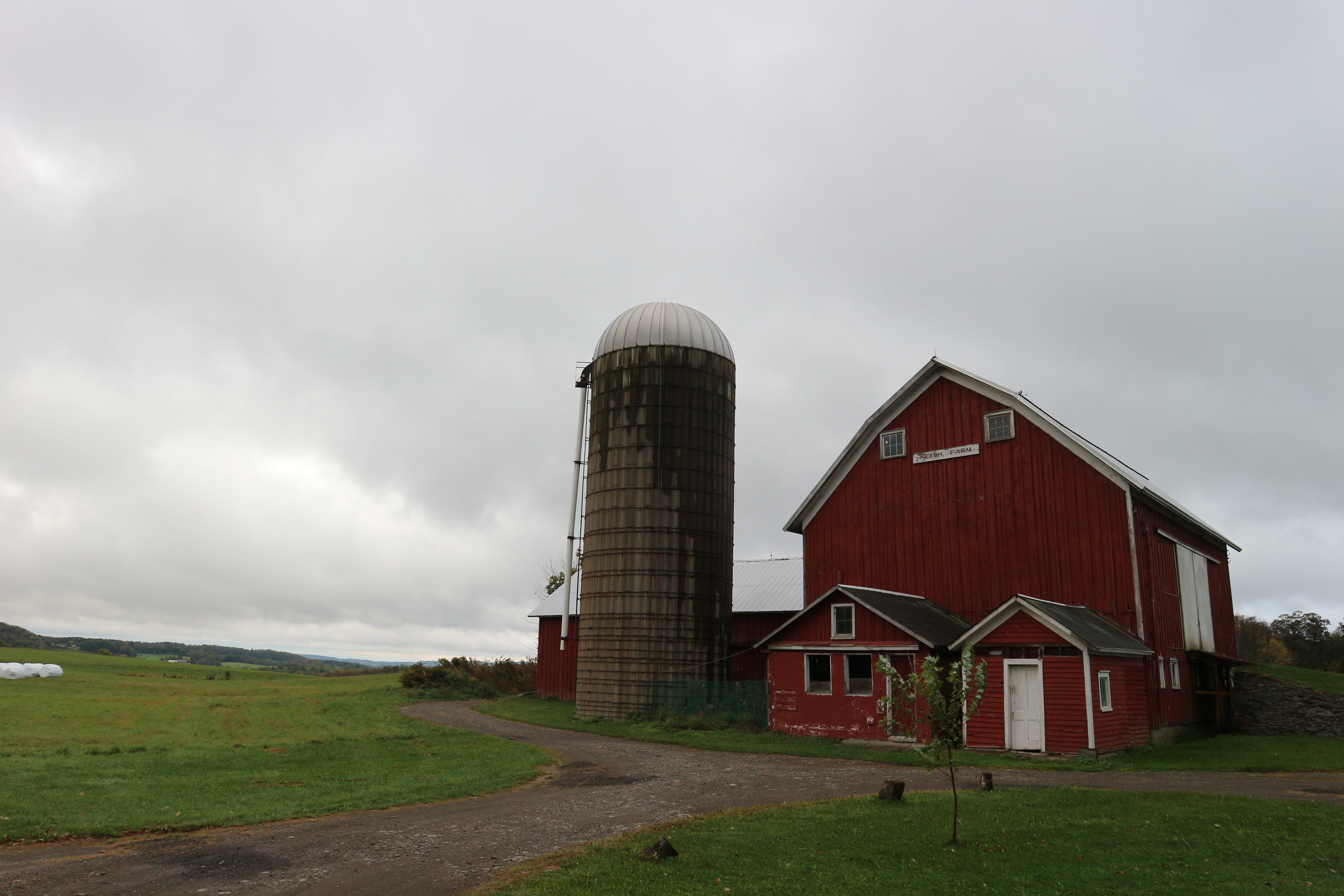
- Lipe Farm

- Location within New York Location within the United States
- Nearest city: Newark Valley, New York
- Coordinates: 42°11′56″N 76°9′56″W
- Area: 167 acres (68 ha)
- Built: 1872
- Architectural style: Late Victorian
- MPS: Newark Valley MPS
- NRHP reference No.: 98000160
- Added to NRHP: March 16, 1998

Lipe Farm is a historic home and farm complex located at Newark Valley in Tioga County, New York. The house was built about 1872 and consists of three principal sections: a 2-story front-gabled wing, a 1 1/2-story side gable, and a long 1-story rear addition. Also on the property are a cow barn, wagon house, garage, tractor shed, granary, hen house, silo and stone wall.

It was listed on the National Register of Historic Places in 1998.

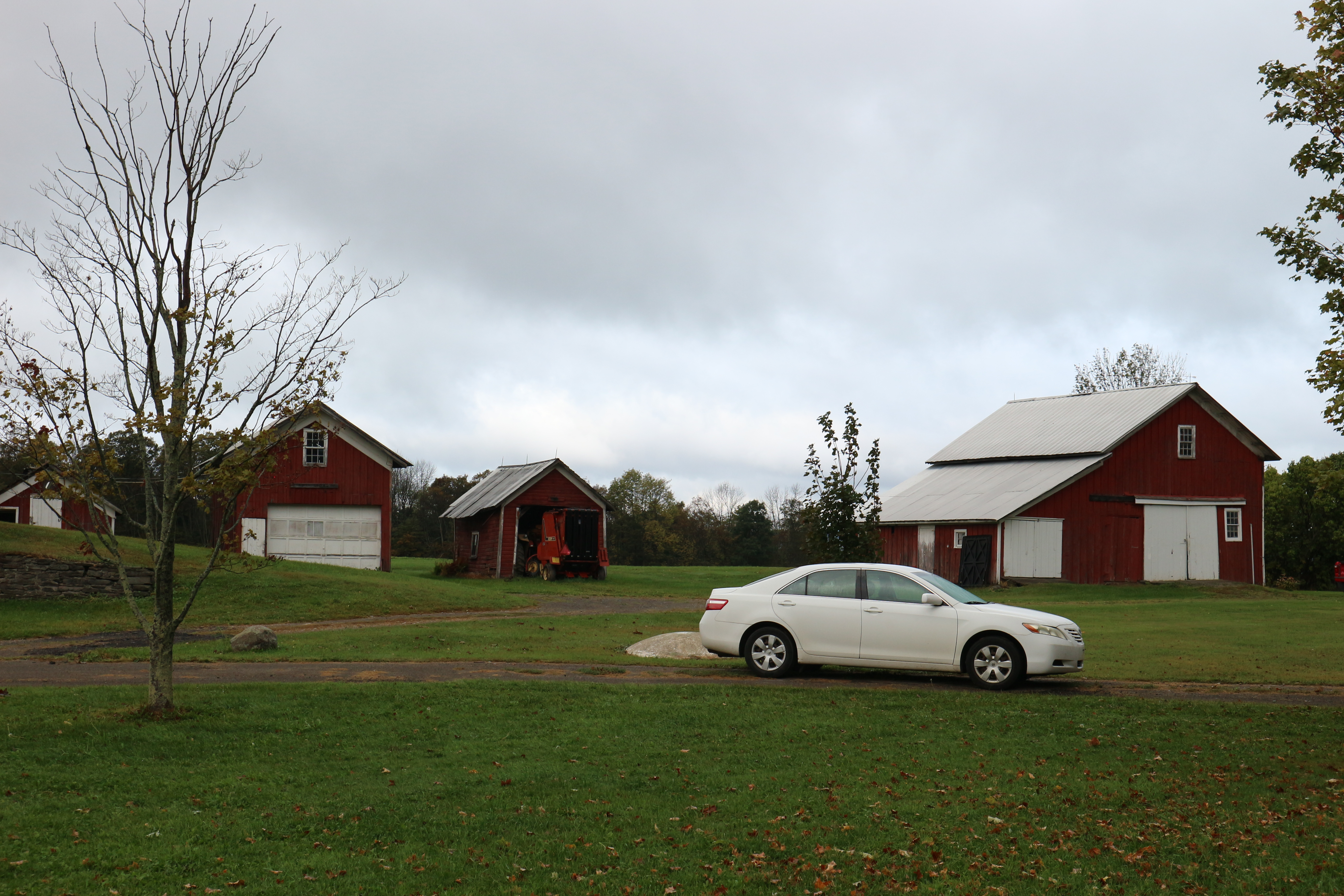
Lipe Farm Buildings
