= West Newark Congregational Church and Cemetery =

Historic church in New York, United States

- U.S. National Register of Historic Places
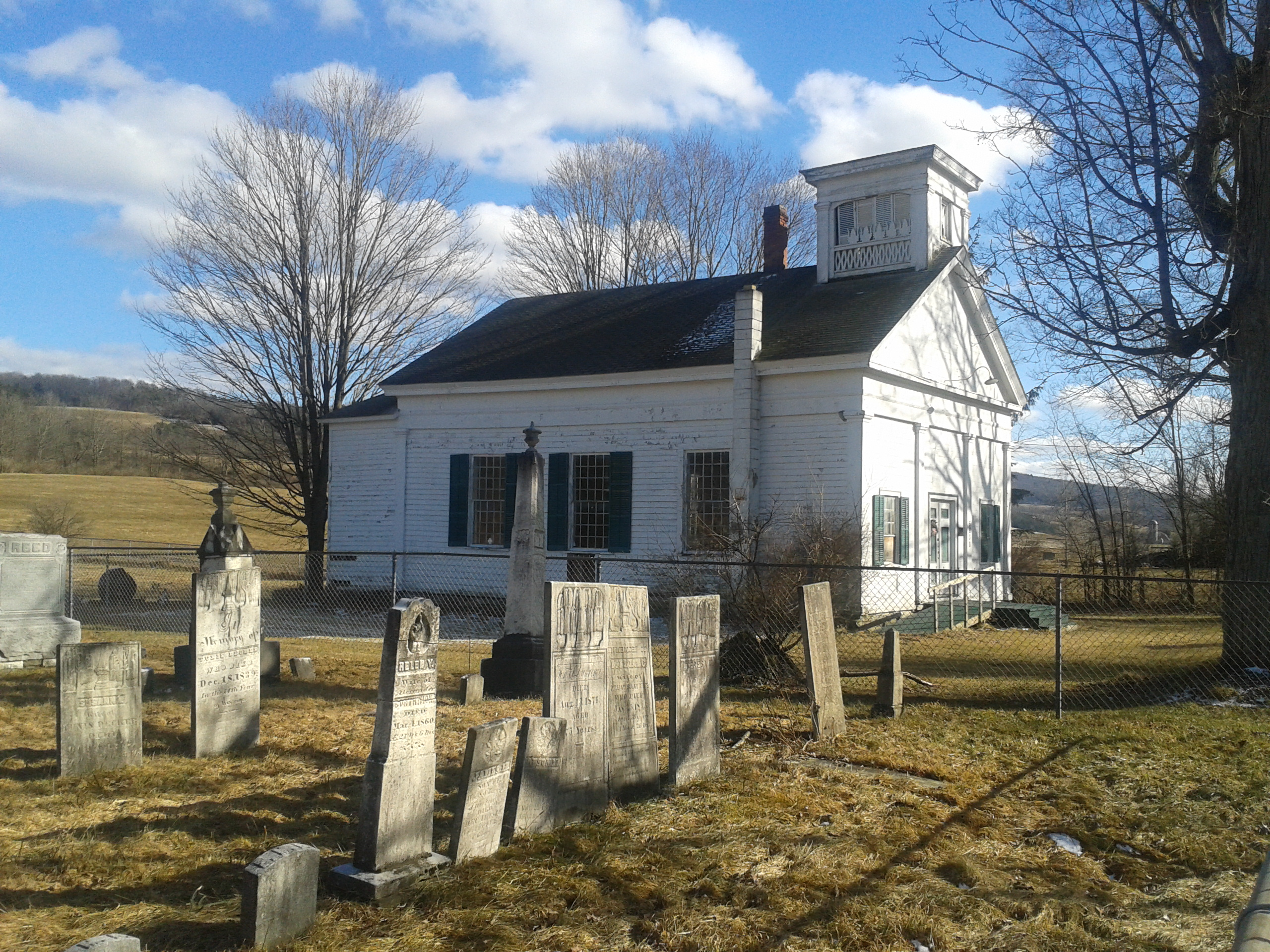
- West Newark Congregational Church and Cemetery, February 2012

- Location within New York Location within the United States
- Nearest city: Newark Valley, New York
- Coordinates: 42°14′32″N 76°14′9″W
- Area: 1.5 acres (0.61 ha)
- Built: 1848
- Architect: Hover, Gilbert; Chitterden, Reuben
- Architectural style: Greek Revival
- MPS: Newark Valley MPS
- NRHP reference No.: 98000165
- Added to NRHP: March 16, 1998

West Newark Congregational Church and Cemetery is a historic Congregational church and cemetery located at Newark Valley in Tioga County, New York. It is a Greek Revival style, front gabled frame structure built in 1848. The front facade features a large square bell tower centered in the gable ridge. Also on the property is a cemetery dating to the 1820s with burials in all subsequent eras.

It was listed on the National Register of Historic Places in 1998.
