= Morris Clinton House =

Historic house in New York, United States

- U.S. National Register of Historic Places
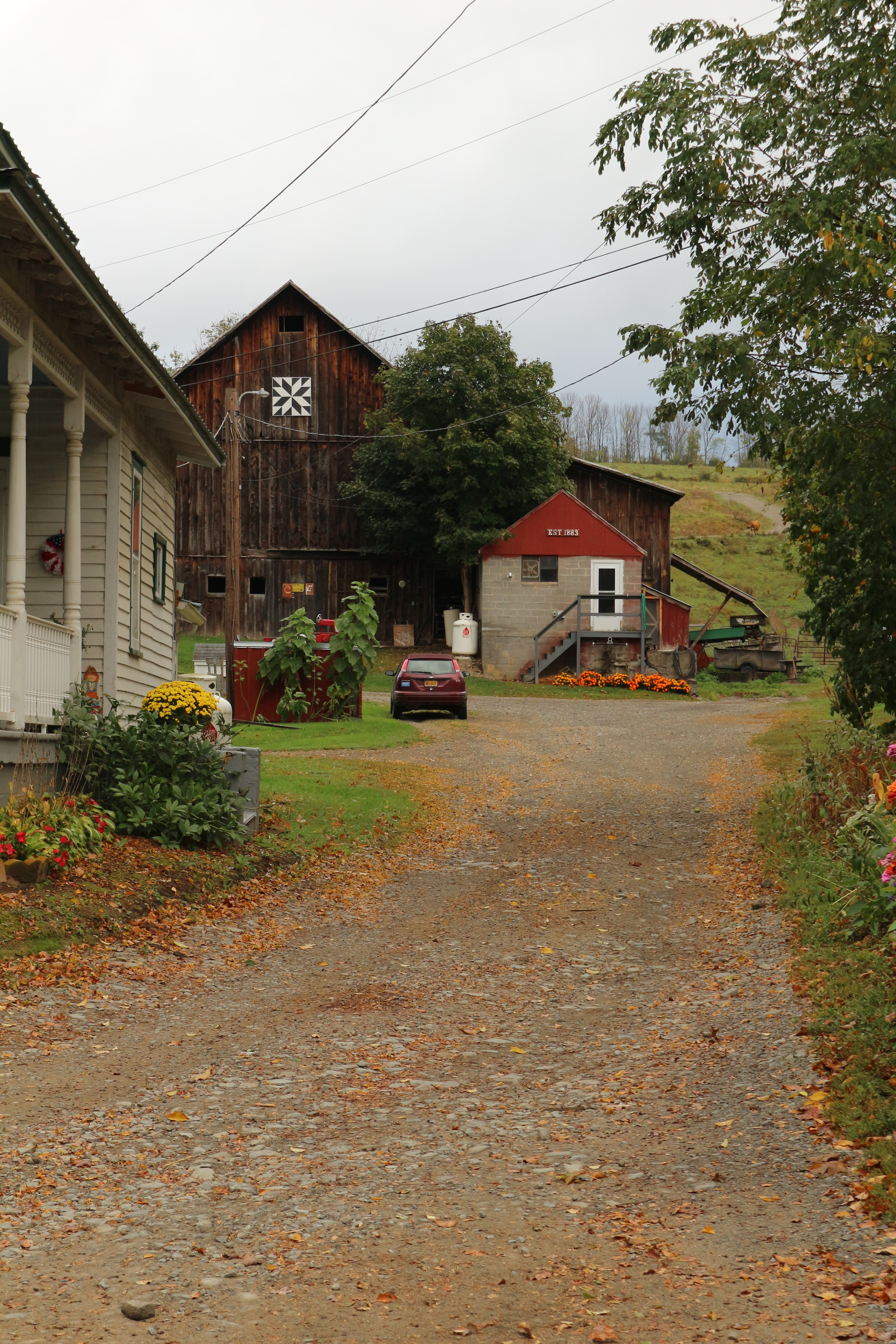

- Location within New York Location within the United States
- Nearest city: Newark Valley, New York
- Coordinates: 42°12′41″N 76°10′49″W
- Area: 25 acres (10 ha)
- Built: 1881
- Architect: Clinton, Morris
- Architectural style: Late Victorian
- MPS: Newark Valley MPS
- NRHP reference No.: 98000162
- Added to NRHP: March 16, 1998

Morris Clinton House is a historic home located at Newark Valley in Tioga County, New York. It was built in 1881 and is an L-shaped, 2 1/2-story, frame house, with a 2-story wood shed wing at the north end of the rear ell. In 1882, the house was featured in an agricultural journal as an example of progressive rural architecture. Also on the property are a milk house, two small livestock sheds, and a garage or small carriage house.

It was listed on the National Register of Historic Places in 1998.
