= Newark Valley, New York =

Coordinates: 42°13′23″N 76°11′8″W

- Town
- Location in the state of New York
- Country: United States
- State: New York
- County: Tioga
- Settled: Around 1791
- Incorporated (as "Westville"): 1823
- Renamed (to "Newark"): 1824
- Renamed (to "Newark Valley"): 1862

Area
  - Total: 50.4 sq mi (131 km^{2})
  - Land: 50.3 sq mi (130 km^{2})
  - Water: 0.1 sq mi (0.26 km^{2})

Population (2020)
  - Total: 3,660
  - Density: 81.4/sq mi (31.4/km^{2})
- Time zone: UTC-5 (Eastern (EST))
  - Summer (DST): UTC-4 (EDT)

Newark Valley is a town in Tioga County, New York, United States. The population is 4,097 according to the town's website, while the U.S. census estimates it currently to be 3,604. The town is named after the city of Newark, New Jersey.

The Town of Newark Valley contains a village also named Newark Valley. The town is located in the northeast part of the county and is northwest of Binghamton.

== History ==
The first permanent settlers arrived around 1791. This area was called Brown's Settlement and was part of the Town of Berkshire until it was organized as the "Town of Westville" in 1823. In 1824, the town changed its name to "Newark," at the suggestion of a settler from New Jersey, but then changed the name to Newark Valley in 1862, to avoid conflict with the name of a village in Wayne County.

One of the earliest settlers was Richard Sarles (1753-1849), a native of Bedford (town), New York and a veteran of the American Revolutionary War whose descendants share a common heritage albeit with various spelling permutations (Searles, Sarles, Sarlls). The area where he settled was known as Searlestown, between Newark Valley (village), New York and Flemingville Owego, New York, and the cemetery where he and over two dozen Newark Valley relatives and descendants are buried bears that same name.

The Belcher-Holden Farm, Bement-Billings House, Blewer Farm, Daniel Chamberlain House, Morris Clinton House, Farrand-Pierson House, Lipe Farm, Maple Lawn Farm, John Settle Farm, Wade Farm, West Newark Congregational Church and Cemetery, and West Newark School House are listed on the National Register of Historic Places.

== Geography ==
According to the United States Census Bureau, the town has a total area of 50.4 square miles (130.6 km^{2}), of which 50.3 square miles (130.4 km^{2}) is land and 0.1 square mile (0.2 km^{2}) (0.16%) is water.

The eastern town line is the border of Broome County.

New York State Route 38 and New York State Route 38B intersect south of Newark Valley village.

== Demographics ==
Historical population
Census	Pop.	Note	%±
1830	1,029		—
1840	1,616		57.0%
1850	1,983		22.7%
1860	2,169		9.4%
1870	2,321		7.0%
1880	2,577		11.0%
1890	2,339		−9.2%
1900	2,164		−7.5%
1910	2,102		−2.9%
1920	1,889		−10.1%
1930	1,843		−2.4%
1940	2,210		19.9%
1950	2,384		7.9%
1960	2,880		20.8%
1970	3,323		15.4%
1980	3,765		13.3%
1990	4,189		11.3%
2000	4,097		−2.2%
2010	3,946		−3.7%
2020	3,660		−7.2%
2021 (est.)	3,604	▼	−1.5%
U.S. Decennial Census

As of the census of 2000, there were 4,097 people, 1,488 households, and 1,123 families residing in the town. The population density was 81.4 inhabitants per square mile (31.4/km^{2}). There were 1,615 housing units at an average density of 32.1 per square mile (12.4/km^{2}). The racial makeup of the town was 98.19% White, 0.37% Black or African American, 0.20% Native American, 0.32% Asian, 0.24% from other races, and 0.68% from two or more races. Hispanic or Latino of any race were 0.66% of the population.

There were 1,488 households, out of which 38.4% had children under the age of 18 living with them, 62.1% were married couples living together, 8.9% had a female householder with no husband present, and 24.5% were non-families. 19.8% of all households were made up of individuals, and 8.6% had someone living alone who was 65 years of age or older. The average household size was 2.71 and the average family size was 3.11.

In the town, the population was spread out, with 28.6% under the age of 18, 8.2% from 18 to 24, 29.2% from 25 to 44, 22.9% from 45 to 64, and 11.1% who were 65 years of age or older. The median age was 37 years. For every 100 females, there were 103.9 males. For every 100 females age 18 and over, there were 99.3 males.

The median income for a household in the town was $40,983, and the median income for a family was $45,321. Males had a median income of $32,305 versus $23,777 for females. The per capita income for the town was $17,577. About 4.7% of families and 7.3% of the population were below the poverty line, including 8.8% of those under age 18 and 3.3% of those age 65 or over.

== Parks and recreation ==
There are three parks and recreation areas which are located in either the town or village of Newark Valley.

- Alexander Park - The park was built and donated by Don Alexander in the early 1960s. It continues to be a peaceful tract of land with a serene lake located west of the Newark Valley Middle School. Many community service groups come to utilize this park and help with the upkeep of maintenance.
- Trout Ponds - This beautiful Victorian park was built in 1869 by Mr. Waring who wanted to breed trout, provide a recreation area for the public, and provide a place to build custom fly rods. In its heyday, travelers flocked in masses from the Southern Central Railroad as far as Scranton, Pa, and Syracuse, NY for outdoor family parties and picnicking. Public usage declined toward the turn of the century and New York State took possession to run this park solely as trout breeding. In the 1950s, the village of Newark Valley bought this parcel of land for one dollar from New York State. This family park is still in use for the community to enjoy picnics and reunions.
- Bement-Billings Farmstead - The Farmstead is currently owned and operated by the Newark Valley Historical Society. It is a living history site that interprets the period c.1810. The Farmstead was established by Asa Bement, one of the first settlers who came to Northern Tioga County in 1791. The house was donated by Mrs. Myrtie Louise Billings Hills in 1976 to the newly formed Historical Society. Outbuildings include an English threshing barn, an outhouse, a sap house, a blacksmith shop, a small barn and a farmer's workshop. The Society currently has 95 acres (380,000 m^{2}). The Farmstead is open to the public on weekends from the first weekend in July until the Apple Festival, the first weekend in October. School tours are often conducted in May and June. The Apple Festival is its largest fundraiser.
- Newark Valley Community Center - Formerly known as the Newark Valley United Church of Christ, this building has been reshaped into a spot for the community to gather for events such as karaoke and craft fairs. The space is open to being rented out for family events, birthday parties, and other social gatherings. As of 2024, the Newark Valley Community Center is still being renovated and refurbished by volunteering students from Newark Valley High School's Interact Club and community members.

== Communities and locations in the Town of Newark Valley ==
- Alexander Pond – A small pond west of Newark Valley village.
- East Branch Owego Creek – A stream flowing southward through the western part of the town.
- East Newark – A hamlet in the southern part of the town on NY Route 38B.
- Jenksville – A hamlet in the corner of the town on County Road 33. It is named after Michael Jenks, who settled here in 1797 and built a sawmill in 1803.
- Ketchumville – A hamlet in the northeastern corner of the town on County Road 9. It was formerly and important community in the town.
- West Newark – A hamlet near the western town line on Route 33 and south of Jenksville.
- New Connecticut – A hamlet near the northern town line on County Road 9 west of Ketchumville.
- Newark Valley – The village of Newark Valley is in the west central part of the town on NY-38.
- West Branch Owego Creek – A stream forming the western town boundary.
- Newark Valley Central School District – Newark Valley's main school district
