= Blewer Farm =

Historic house in New York, United States

- U.S. National Register of Historic Places
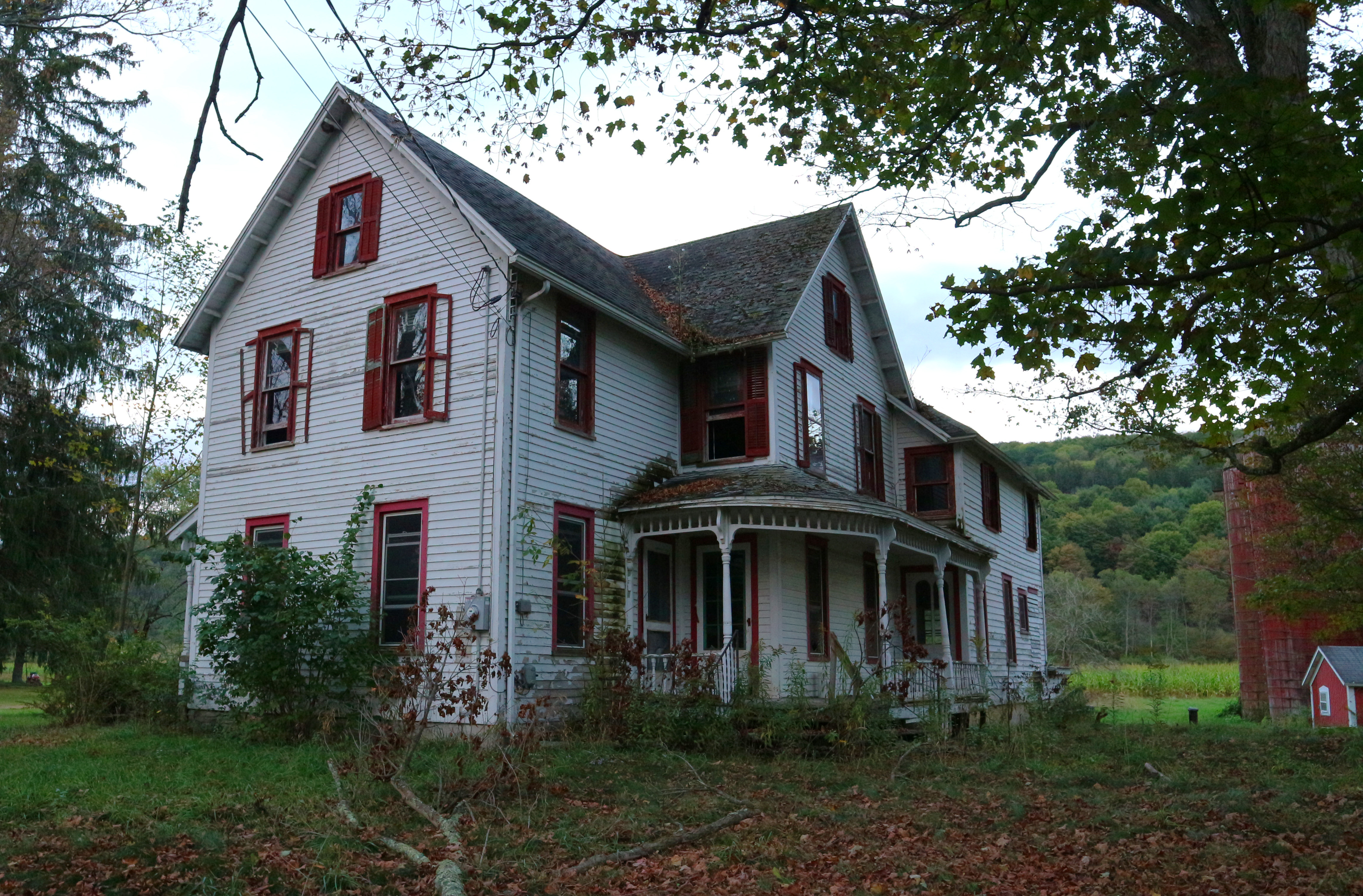
- Main Farmhouse

- Location within New York Location within the United States
- Location: 184 and 226 Blewer-Mead Rd., Newark Valley, New York
- Coordinates: 42°11′50″N 76°13′50″W
- Area: 473 acres (191 ha)
- Architectural style: Queen Anne
- MPS: Newark Valley MPS
- NRHP reference No.: 98000166
- Added to NRHP: March 16, 1998

Blewer Farm is a historic home and farm complex located at Newark Valley in Tioga County, New York. The 2 1/2-story, cross-gabled frame house was constructed between 1885 and 1900 in the Queen Anne style. Also on the property are a tenant house, workshop, dairy barn, livestock shed, former privy, two silos, and two modern sheds. Most of the buildings were built between the late 19th or mid-20th century. The main house is currently in disrepair.

It was listed on the National Register of Historic Places in 1998.

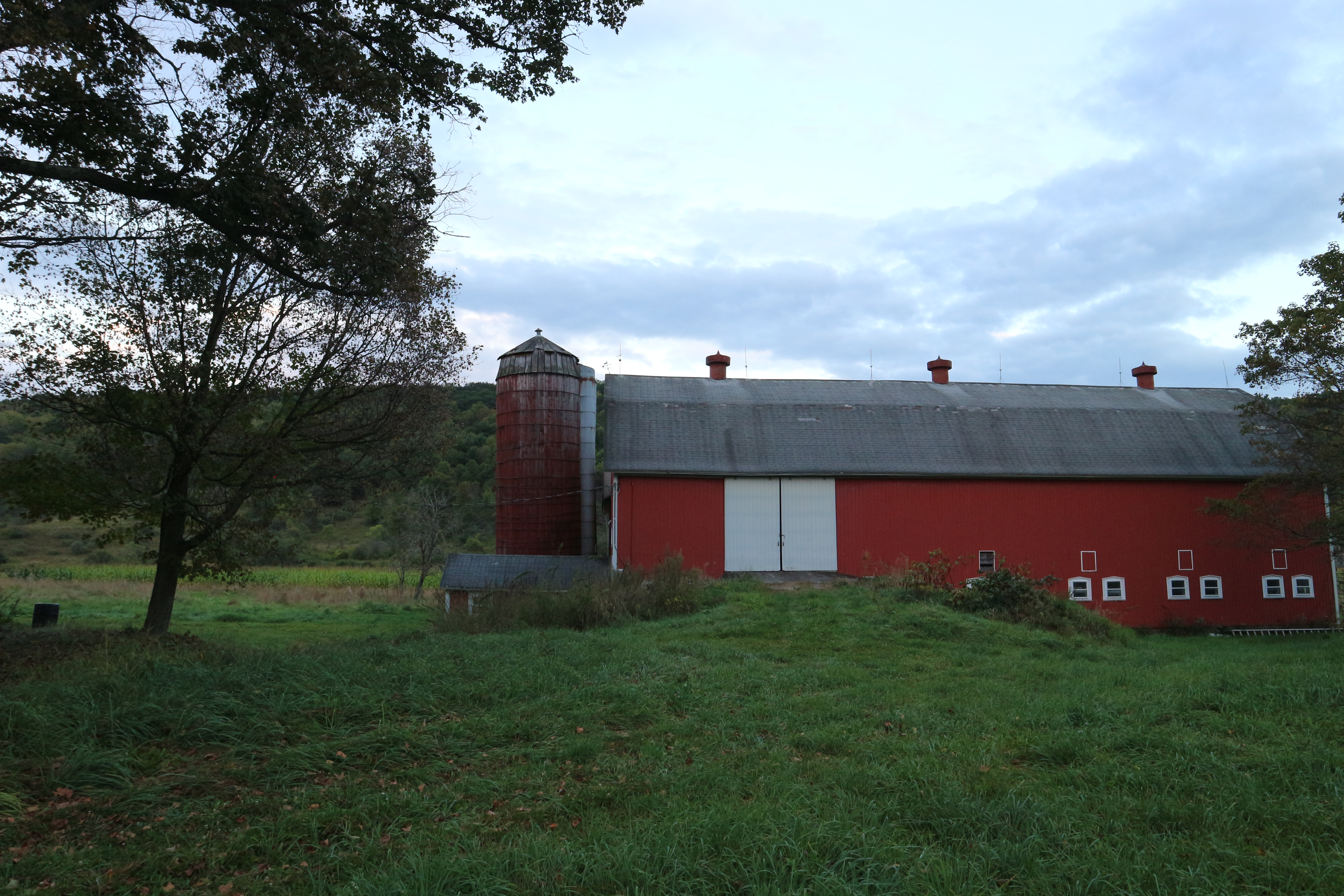
Active Barn

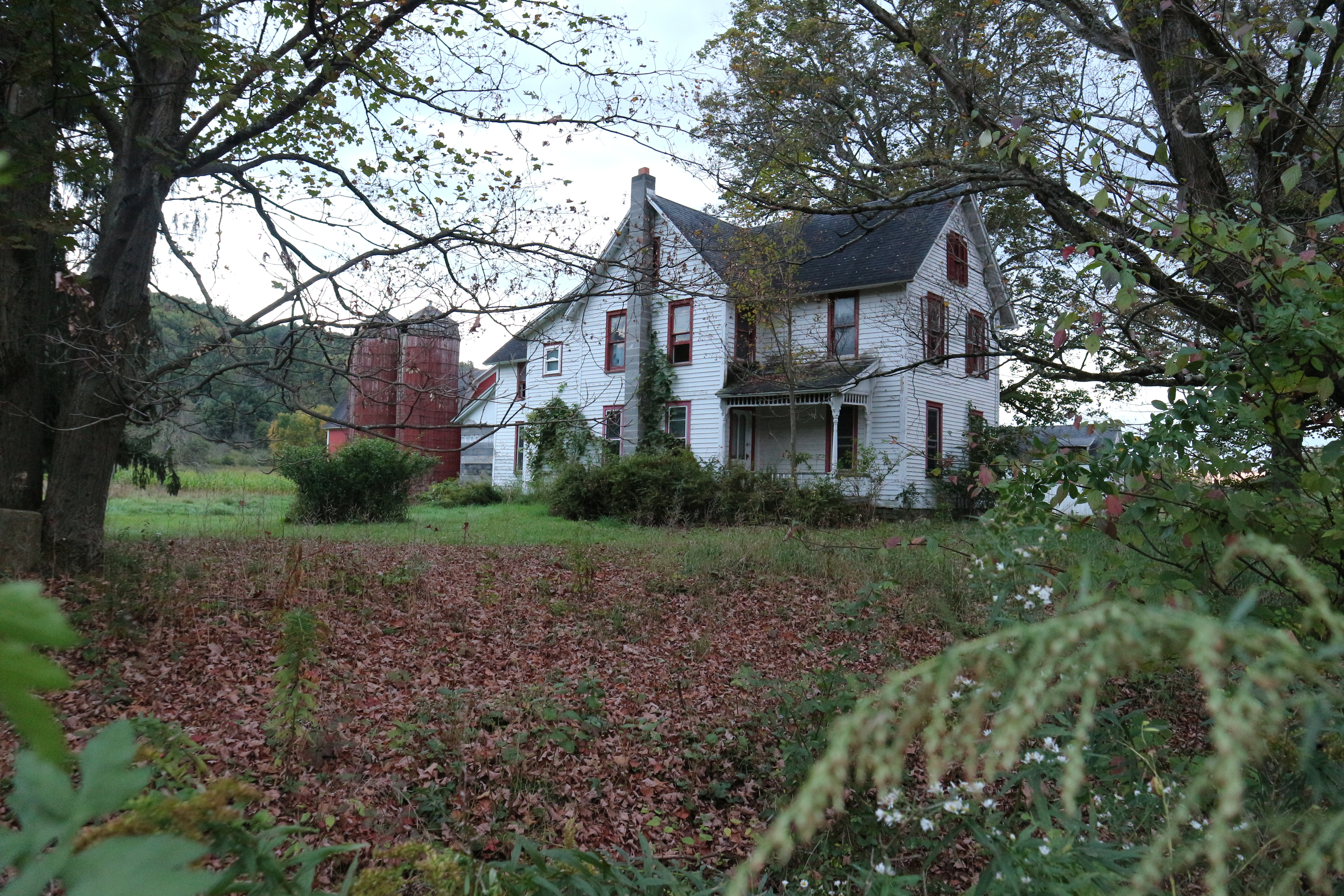

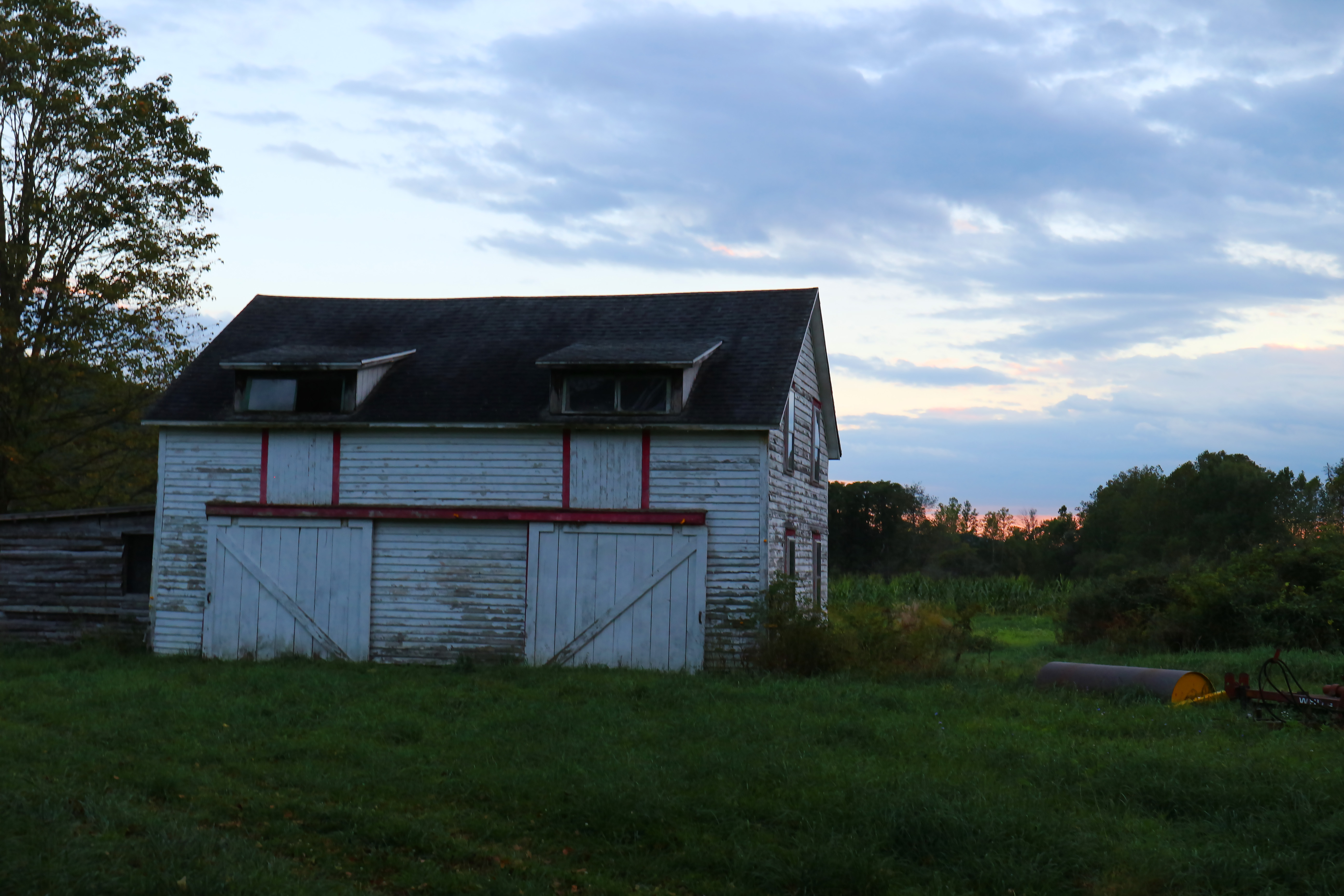

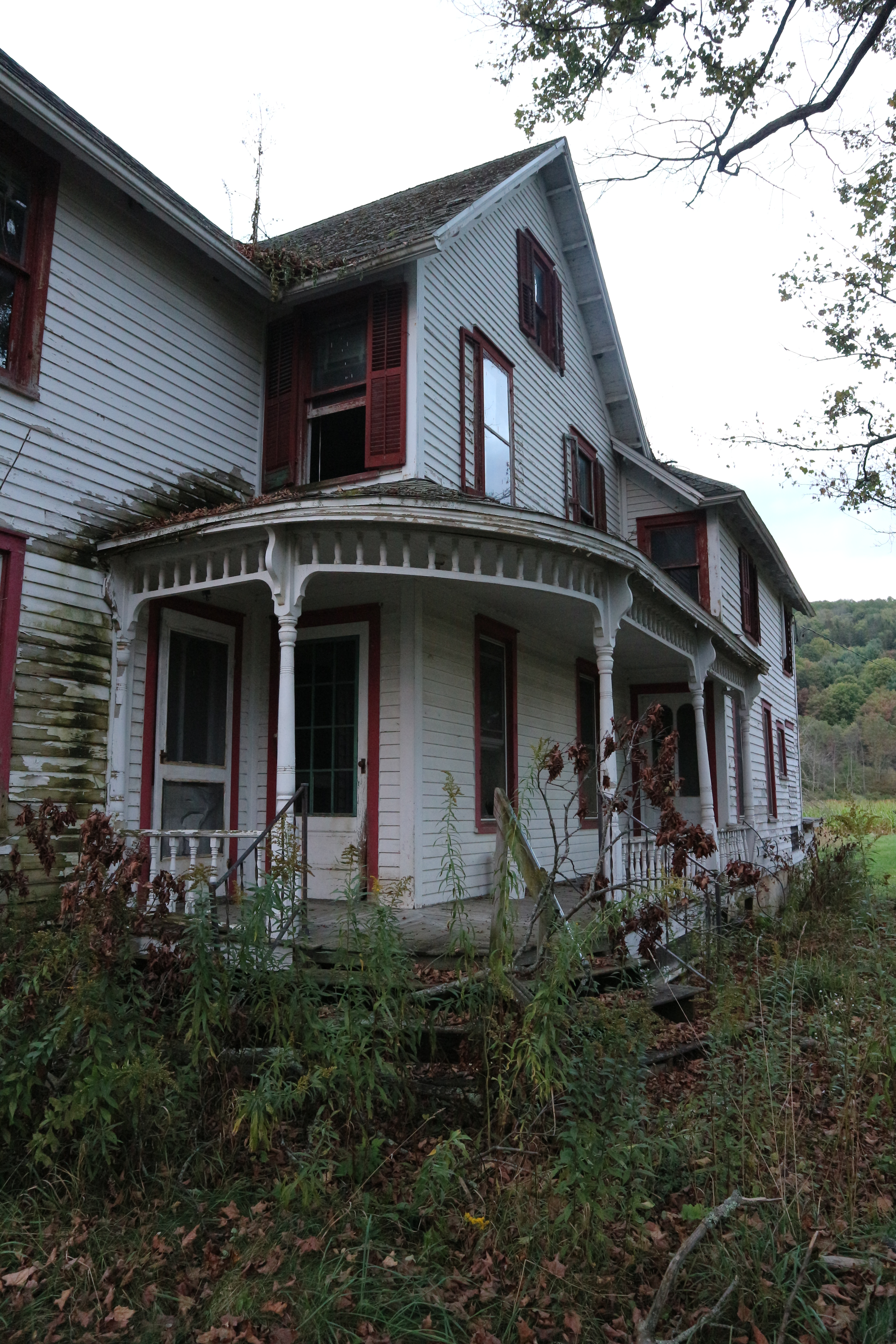
