= John Settle Farm =

Historic house in New York, United States

- U.S. National Register of Historic Places
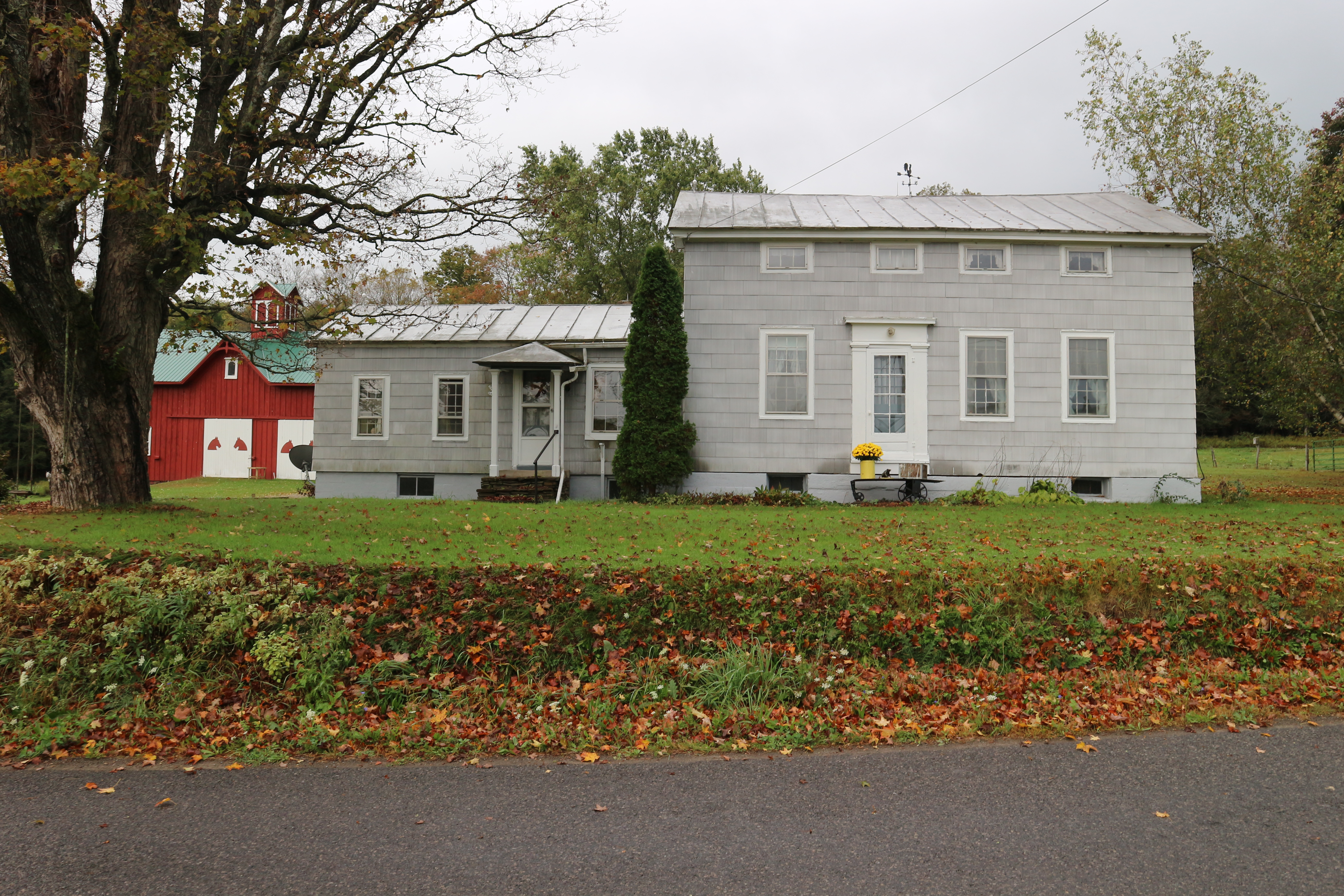

- Location within New York Location within the United States
- Location: 1054 Settle Rd., Newark Valley, New York
- Coordinates: 42°12′31″N 76°7′44″W
- Area: 118 acres (48 ha)
- Built: 1840
- Architectural style: Federal
- MPS: Newark Valley MPS
- NRHP reference No.: 98000161
- Added to NRHP: March 16, 1998

John Settle Farm is a historic home and farm complex located at Newark Valley in Tioga County, New York. The house was built about 1840 in the Federal style. It consists of three principal sections: a 2-story front-gabled wing, a 1 1/2-story side gable, and a long 1-story rear addition. Also on the property are a dairy barn, horse barn, chicken house, pig house, granary, shed, and silo. The dairy barn is currently in disrepair but all other buildings appear well maintained.

It was listed on the National Register of Historic Places in 1998.

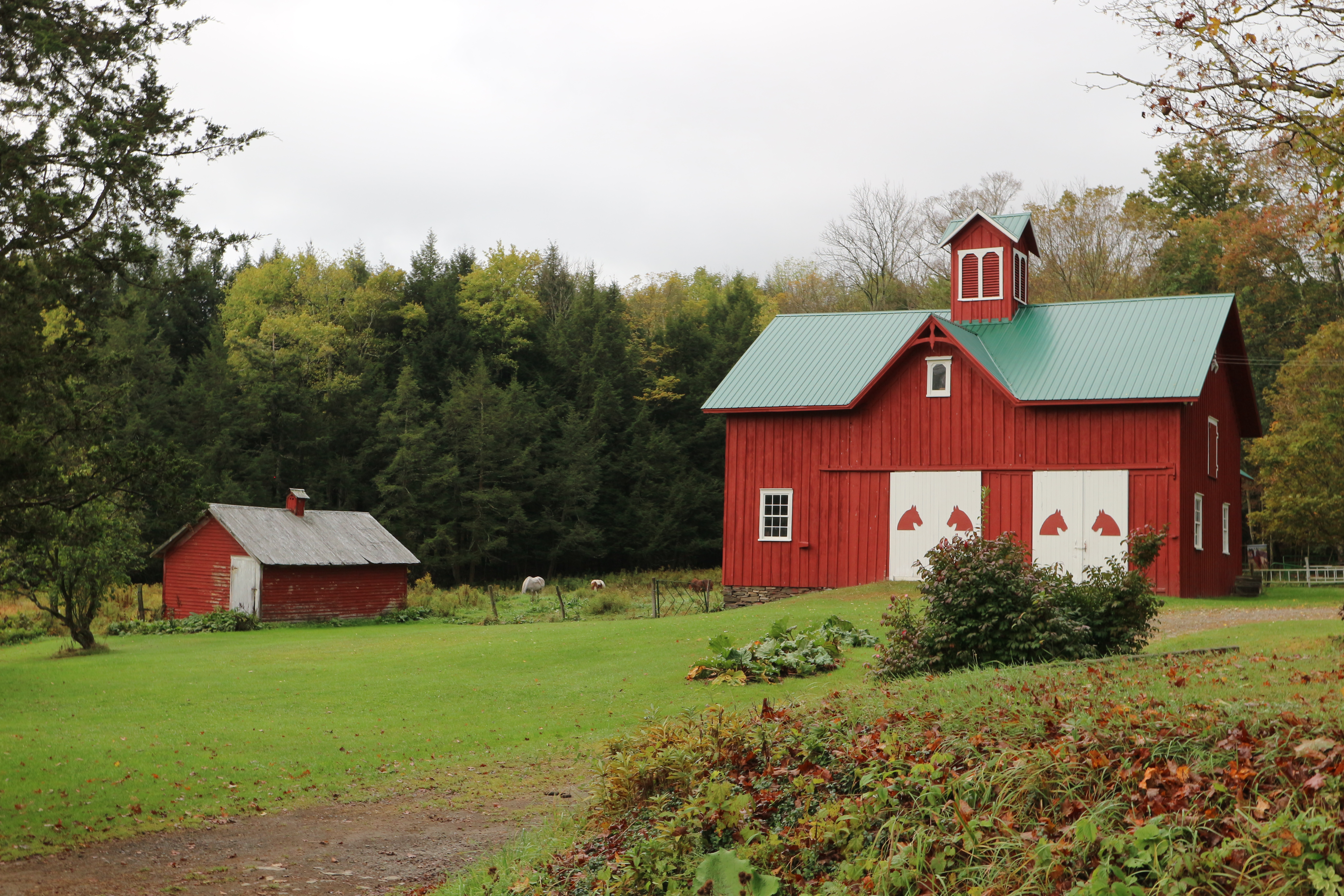

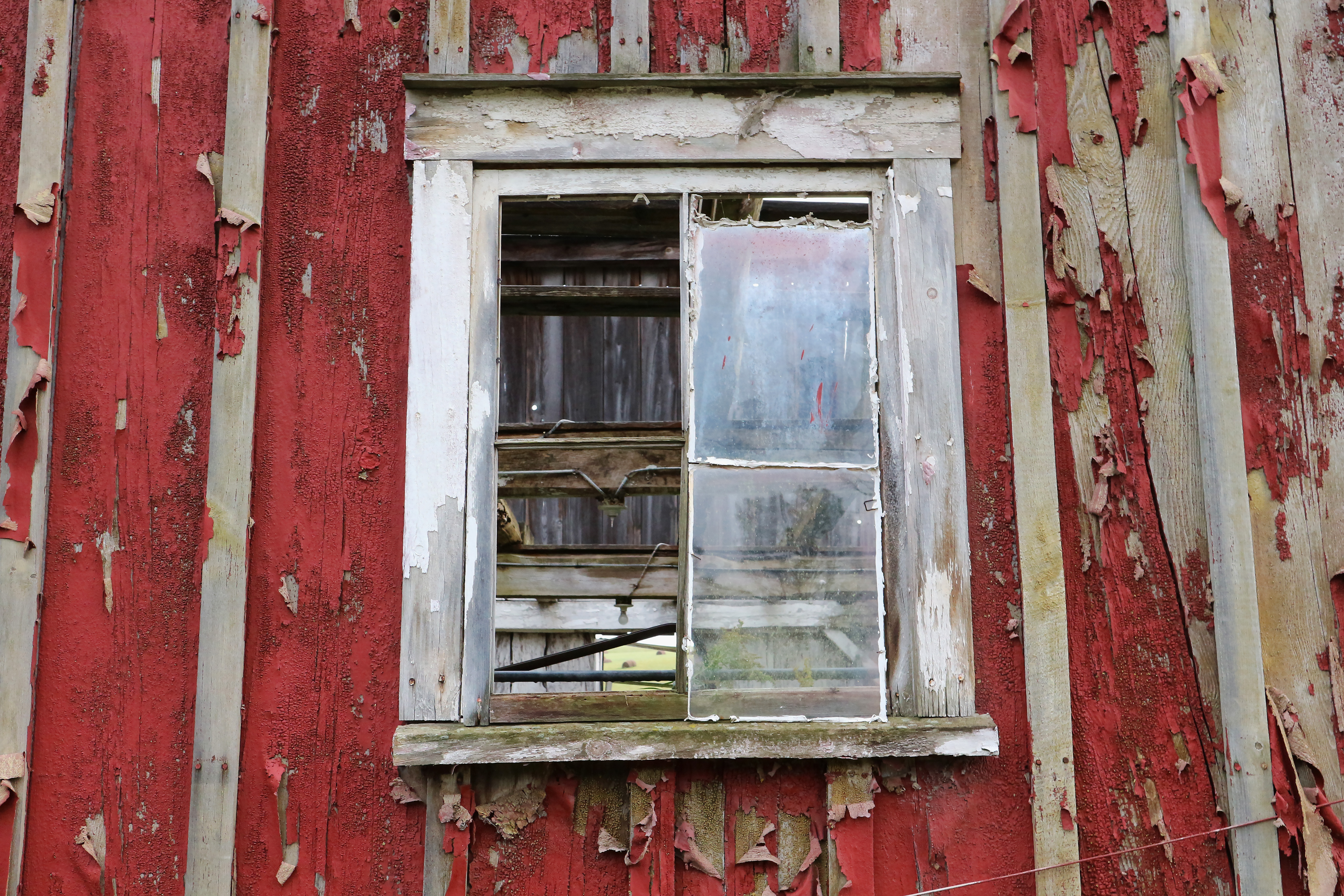

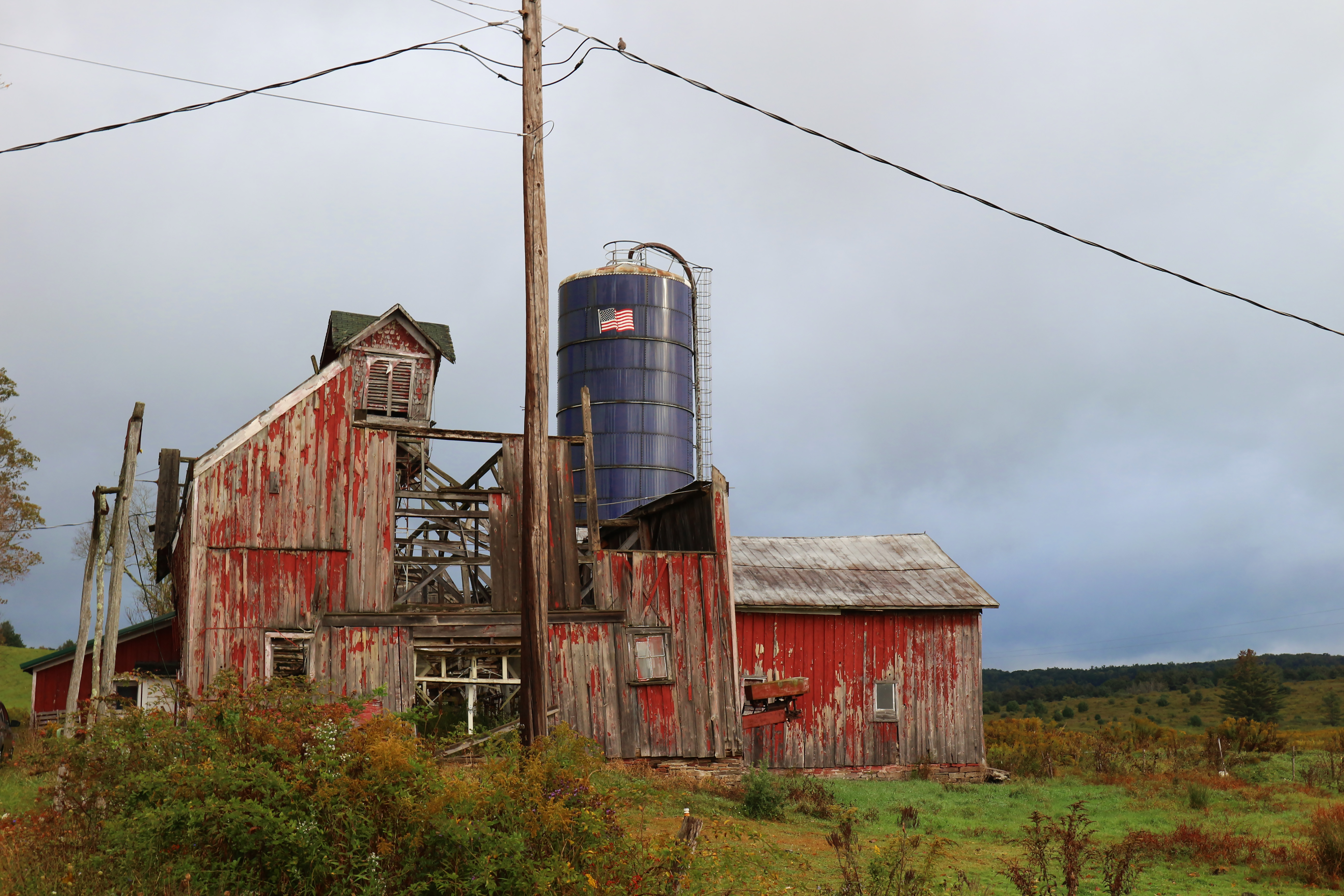
