= West Newark School House =

- U.S. National Register of Historic Places
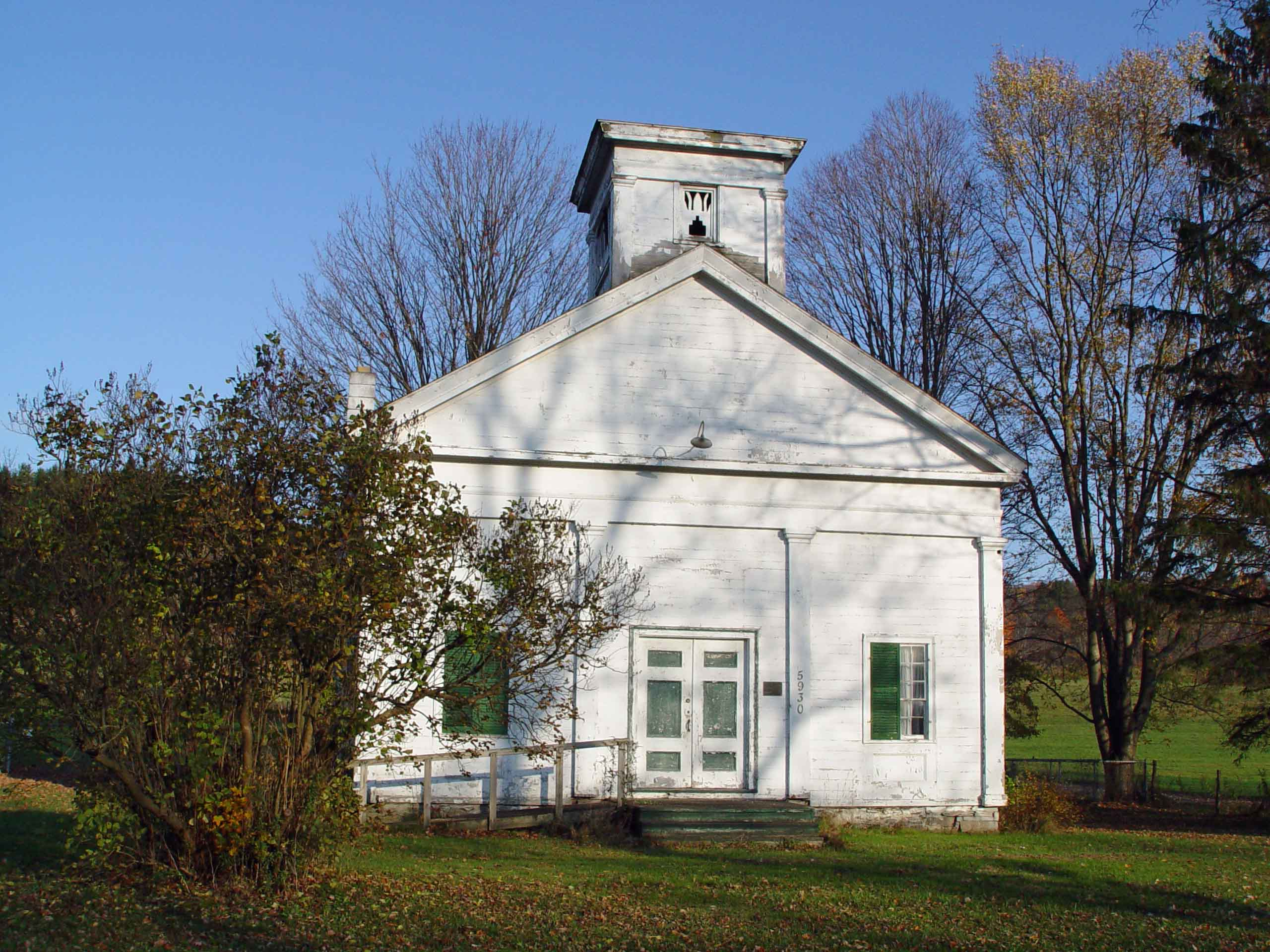

- Location within New York Location within the United States
- Nearest city: Newark Valley, New York
- Coordinates: 42°14′30″N 76°14′12″W
- Area: less than one acre
- Built: 1823
- Architectural style: Greek Revival
- MPS: Newark Valley MPS
- NRHP reference No.: 98000163
- Added to NRHP: March 16, 1998

West Newark School House is a historic church and school located at Newark Valley in Tioga County, New York. It is of frame construction and designed in the Greek Revival style. It was built in 1823-1824 as a combined school and church building by members of the West Newark Congregational Church. It served this dual role until 1848 when it became used only as a school. It functioned as a school until 1931.

It was listed on the National Register of Historic Places in 1998.
