= Daniel Chamberlain House =

Historic house in New York, United States

- U.S. National Register of Historic Places
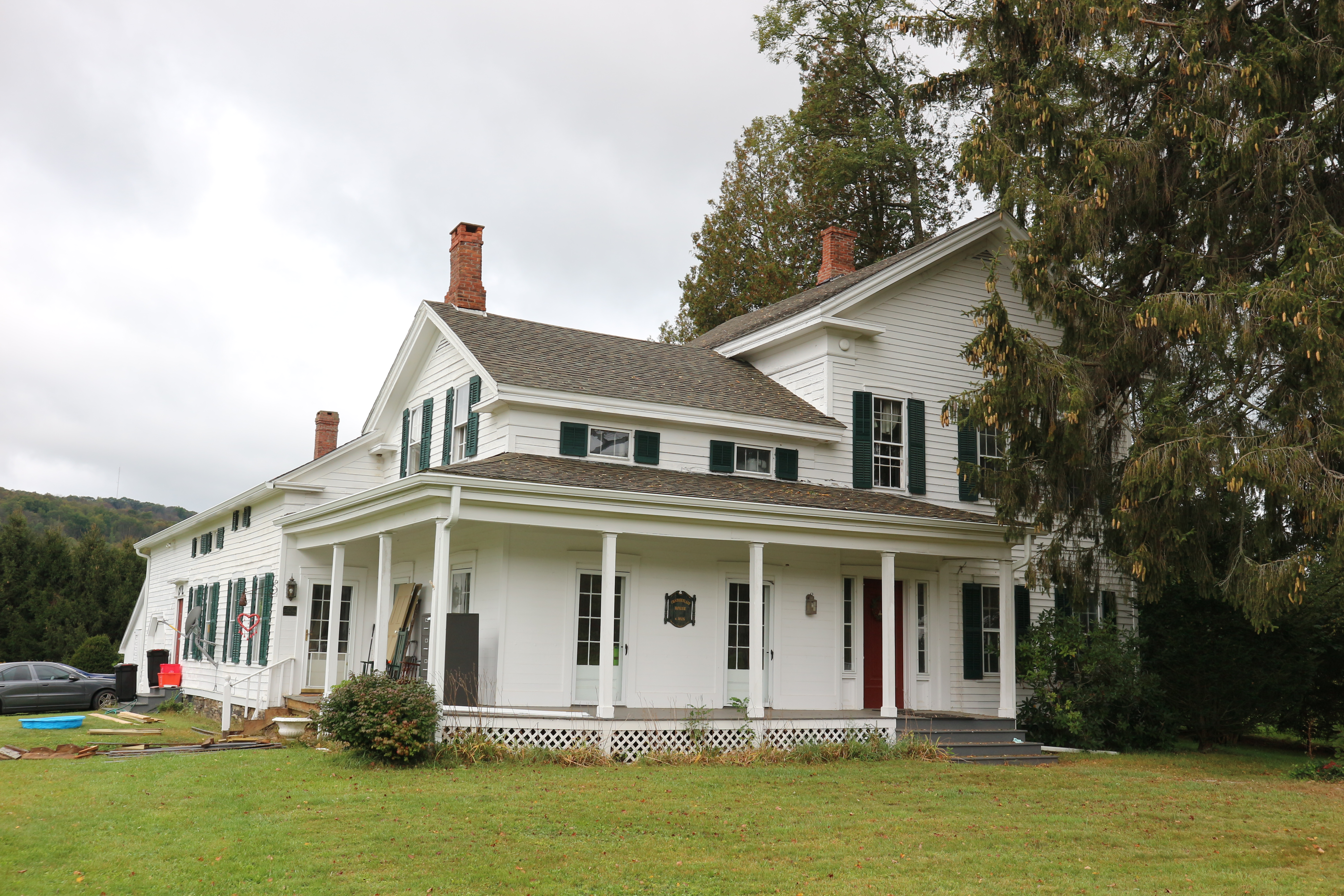

- Location within New York Location within the United States
- Location: 627 Brown Rd., Newark Valley, New York
- Coordinates: 42°16′22″N 76°10′28″W
- Area: 6.1 acres (2.5 ha)
- Built: 1825
- Architectural style: Greek Revival, Federal, Early Republic
- MPS: Newark Valley MPS
- NRHP reference No.: 97001489
- Added to NRHP: December 15, 1997

The Daniel Chamberlain House is a historic home located at Newark Valley in Tioga County, New York. The house was built in three phases between 1835 and 1865 and exhibits characteristic features of the Federal, Greek Revival, and Italianate styles. The most prominent section was constructed between 1855 and 1865 and is the tall, two story, front gabled section located at the northeast corner. The oldest section is the rear wing. Also on the property is a small gabled building used originally as a milk house.

The Daniel Chamberlain House was listed on the National Register of Historic Places in 1997.

== Gallery ==
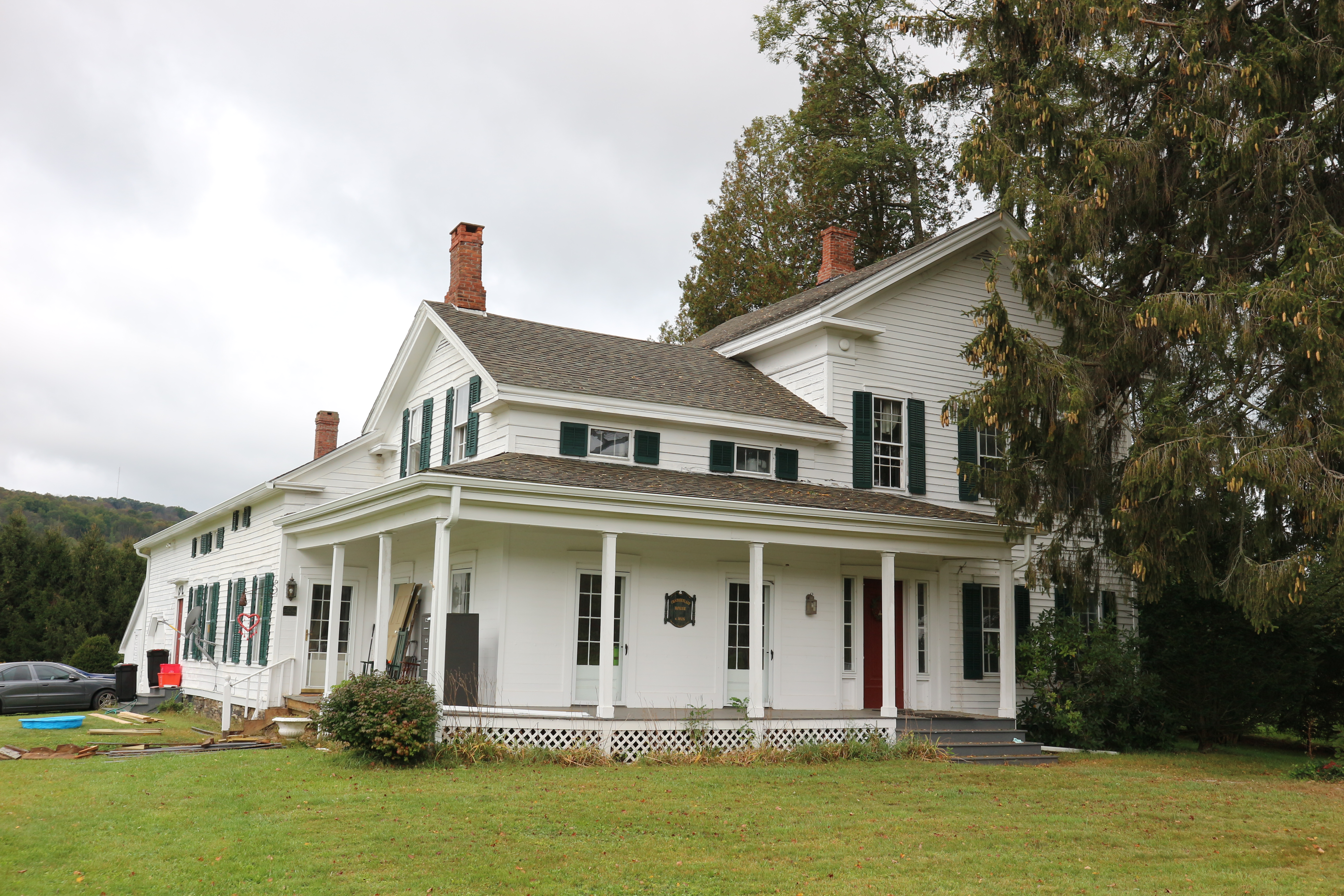
A view of the front of the house

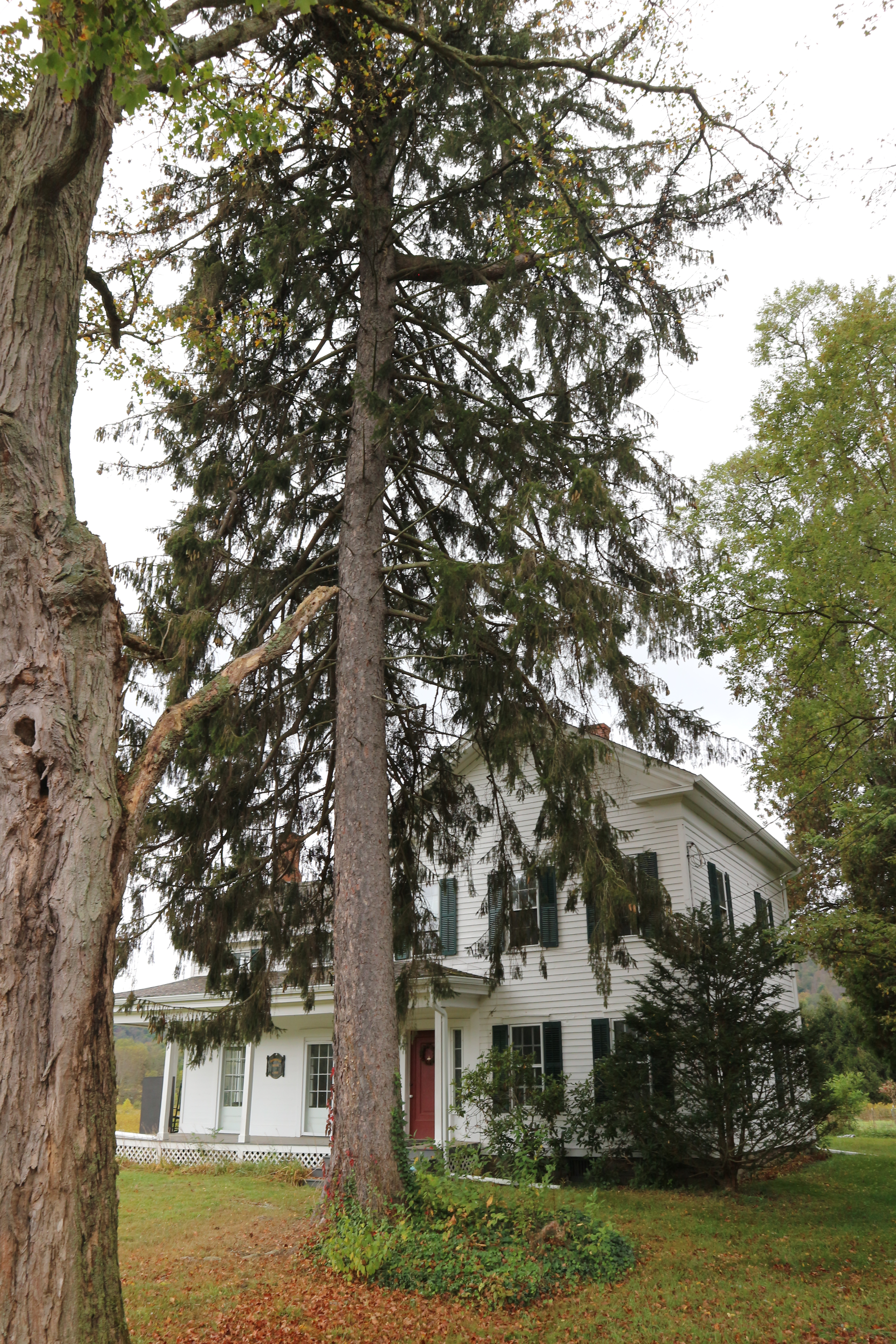
A tree in front of the house
