= Maple Lawn Farm =

Historic house in New York, United States

- U.S. National Register of Historic Places
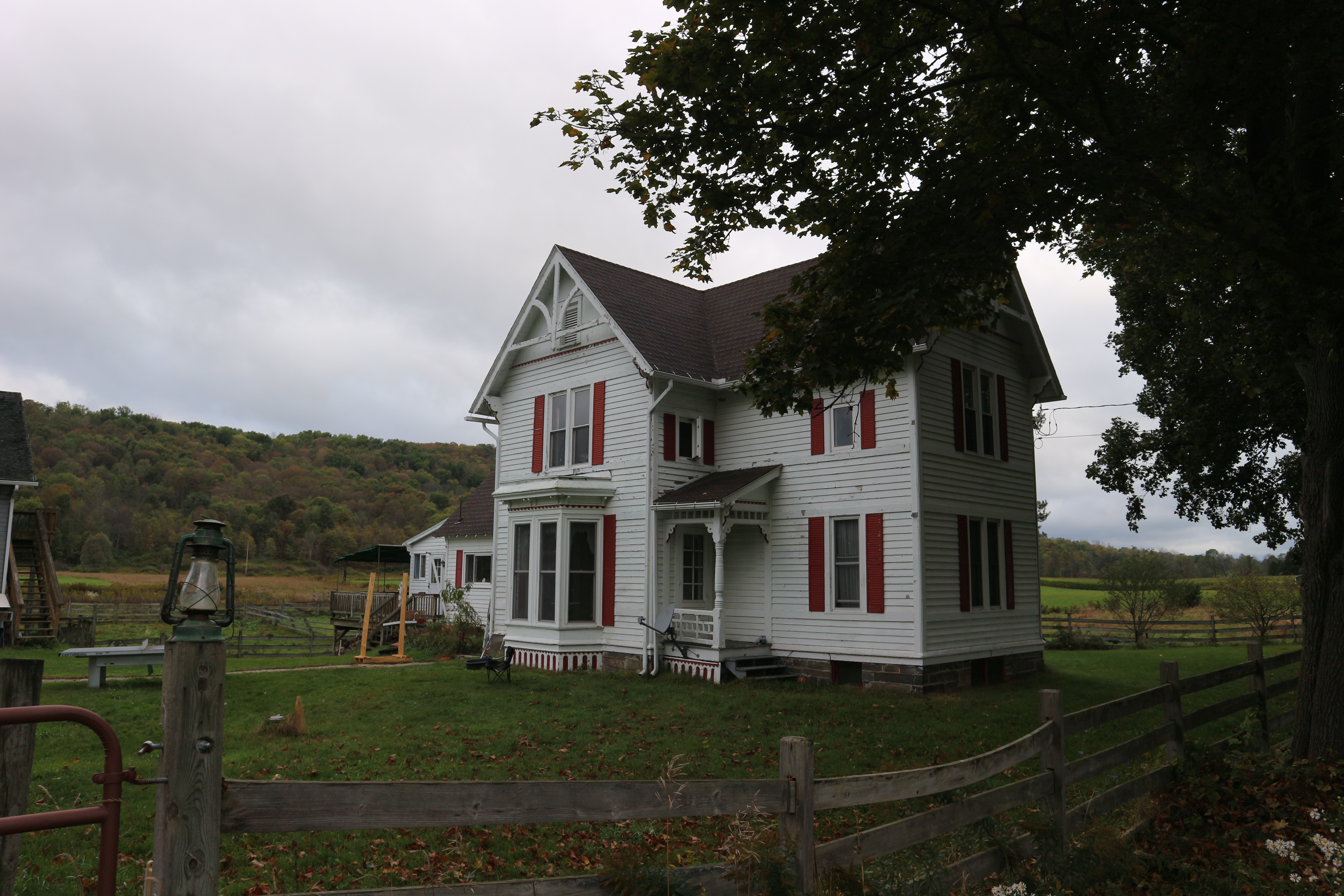

- Location within New York Location within the United States
- Location: 10981 NY 38, Newark Valley, New York
- Coordinates: 42°15′39″N 76°11′0″W
- Area: 24 acres (9.7 ha)
- Built: 1840
- Architectural style: Stick/Eastlake, Late Victorian
- MPS: Newark Valley MPS
- NRHP reference No.: 97001487
- Added to NRHP: December 15, 1997

Maple Lawn Farm is a historic home located at Newark Valley in Tioga County, New York. The frame house was constructed in the 1880s in the Stick Style. It consists of a 2 1/2-story T-shaped section on the east, a 2-story rear wing, and a 1-story modern addition. Also on the property is a bank barn built in three stages with sections dating to the early or mid 19th century.

It was listed on the National Register of Historic Places in 1997.

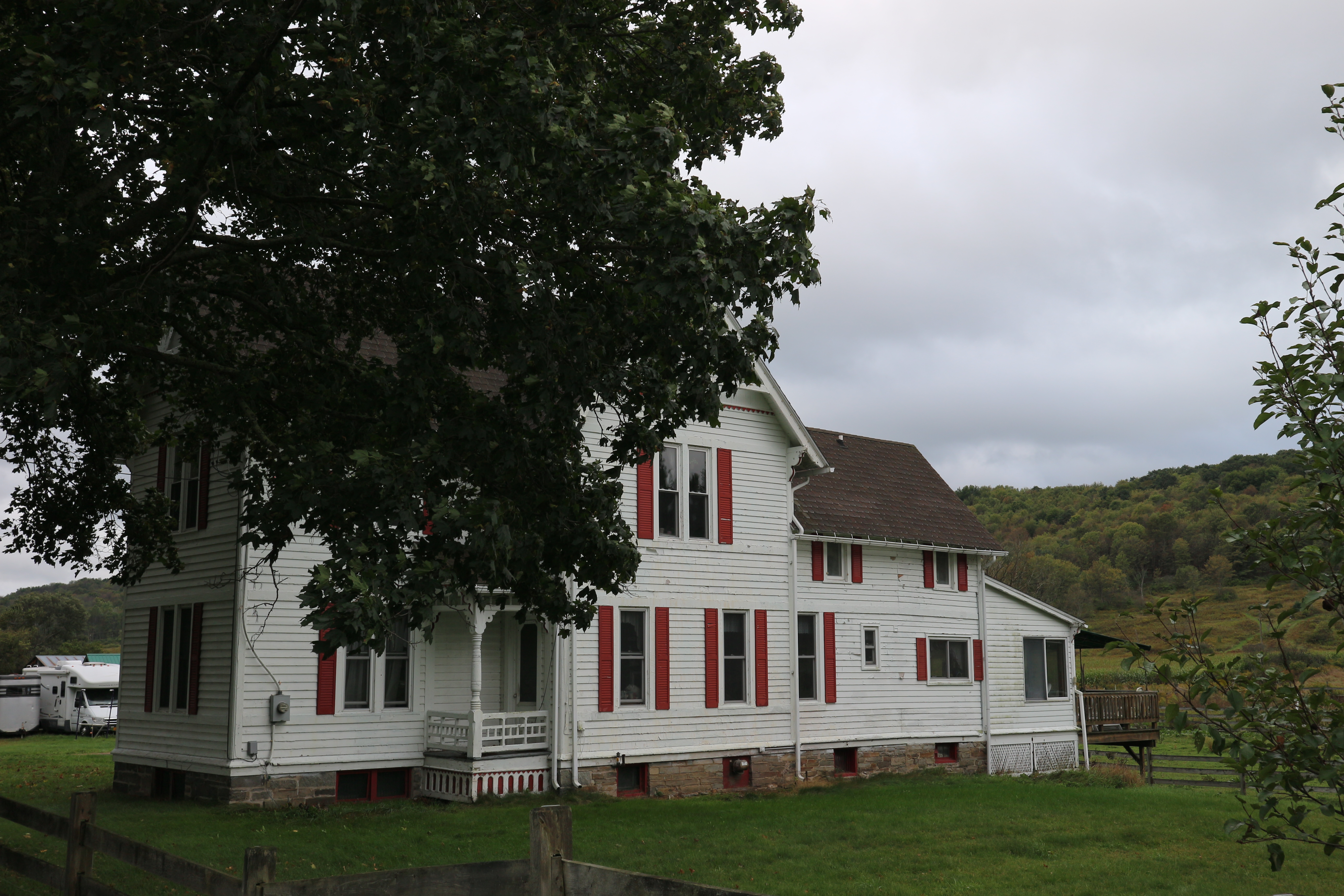
