= Pixton =

Pixton may refer to:

- Howard Pixton, an early British aviator;
- Aaron Pixton, an American mathematician at Princeton University;
- Pixton Park, a country house in the parish of Dulverton, Somerset, England.
