= American Regions Mathematics League =

American mathematics competition

Logo

The American Regions Mathematics League (ARML), is an annual, national high school mathematics team competition held simultaneously at five locations in the United States: the University of Iowa, Penn State, University of Nevada, Reno, Western Carolina University, and Saint Anselm College. Past sites have included San Jose State University, Rutgers University, UNLV, Duke University, and University of Georgia.

Teams consist of 15 members, which usually represent a large geographic region (such as a state) or a large population center (such as a major city). Some schools also field teams. The competition is held in June, on the first Saturday after Memorial Day.

In 2022, 120 teams competed with about 1800 students.

ARML problems cover a wide variety of mathematical topics including algebra, geometry, number theory, combinatorics, probability, and inequalities. Calculus is not required to successfully complete any problem, but it may facilitate solving the problem more quickly or efficiently. While part of the competition is short-answer based, there is a cooperative team round, and a proof-based power question (also completed as a team). ARML problems are harder than most high school mathematics competitions.

The contest is sponsored by D. E. Shaw & Co. Contest supporters are the American Mathematical Society, Mu Alpha Theta (the National Mathematics Honor Society for High School and Two-Year College students), Star League, Penguin Books, and Princeton University Press.

== Competition format ==
The competition consists of four formal events:

- A team round, where the entire team has 20 minutes to solve 10 problems. Each problem is worth 5 points, for a possible total of 50 points
- A power question, where the entire team has one hour to solve a multiple-part (usually ten) question requiring explanations and proofs. This is usually an unusual, unique, or invented topic so students are forced to deal with complex new mathematical ideas. Each problem is weighted for a possible 50 points.
- An individual round, where each team member answers five groups of two questions each, with ten minutes per pair. Starting in 2009, the individual round expanded from eight questions to ten. Each problem is worth 1 point, for a grand total of 150 points possible for the team. Only 12 students nationwide received a perfect score in 2014. This round's format is similar to that of the Target Round in MATHCOUNTS.
- A relay, where the team is broken into five groups of three. Within each group, the first team member solves a problem and passes the solution to the next team member, who plugs that answer into their question, and so on. The allotted time is six minutes, but extra points are given for solving the problem in three minutes. Solving the relay in 3 minutes gives 5 points, solving it in 6 minutes gives 3 points. The whole process is done twice, making the maximum 50 points possible for the team.

The teams are scored based on the number of points they attained with the maximum being 300 points. Team score ties are broken by first considering the sum of the Team and Power Rounds, then the Relay Round total.

At the end, there is a set of tiebreaker questions to determine the top 20 participants, who receive cash prizes from D. E. Shaw & Co. Each student tied for the highest score (or the highest two scores if there are fewer than 20 tied with the top score) is given up to three tiebreaker questions, one at a time, with the goal of answering correctly as quickly as possible. As soon as a student answers a tiebreaker question correctly, they have finished the tiebreaker. Students are then ranked by individual round score, followed by the time to answer the first tiebreaker question correctly, then the time to answer the second tiebreaker (if applicable), then the third. Students are given 10 minutes to answer the first tiebreaker question, and 6 minutes to answer each of the second and third tiebreaker questions.

In recent years, there has been a super relay, where two groups of seven team members (fourteen in all) both work to give a correct answer to the fifteenth team member. That last team member substitutes two answers into his problem. For logistical reasons, the Super Relay has never counted towards the team score. It was instituted as a "filler" while scores are tabulated. Candies and other goodies are sometimes rewards for the super relay round.

Also in recent years, a song contest has become an informal event at ARML. Each school is allowed to have any number of their students perform a song related to mathematics, usually a parody of a popular song, with its lyrics replaced.

The format of the ARML competition is based on the NYSML competition, but is generally considered more difficult than the NYSML competition. This format also inspired the Great Plains Math League.

== History ==
The New York State Mathematics League held its first competition in 1973, a competition intended for New York state teams. A team from Massachusetts asked to participate in the 1974 NYSML competition, and it took first place. This led to the creation of the Atlantic Regions Mathematics League in 1976, which became the American Regions Mathematics League in 1984.

When the Atlantic Regions Mathematics League was founded, the competition was held at a single eastern site that changed from year to year:

Year	Location
1976	C. W. Post College
1977	Brown University
1978	Rutgers University
1979	Brown University
1980	Rutgers University
1981	University of Maryland College Park
1982	University of Maryland College Park
1983	Pennsylvania State University

After 1983, the coordinators decided to keep the competition at Penn State University. ARML expanded to two sites in the late 1980s and to three sites in 1995. In 2008, ARML added a fourth site at the University of Georgia in Athens to better accommodate students in the Southeast, which moved to the University of Alabama in Huntsville in 2020.

The 2006 competition saw significant expansion of about 25% more participants than ever before. Attendance at the western site, UNLV, nearly doubled.

Due to the COVID-19 pandemic, the ARML competition was not held in 2020, and it was only held virtually in 2021.

In 2025, as a result of printing and procedural errors at one of the ARML sites, the last individual problem pair (problems 9 and 10) was discarded. Thus, the maximum individual score in 2025 was 8, and all competitors who achieved this score were invited to participate in the tiebreaker round.

== Past team winners ==
Year	Team	Score
1976	New York City A	117
1977	Massachusetts A	148
1978	Fairfax-Montgomery	135
1979	New York City A	129
1980	New York City A	113
1981	New York City A	166
1982	New York City A	132
1983	New York City A	132
1984	New York City A	162
1985	Montgomery County, Maryland A	157
1986	New York City A	183
1987	New York City A	170
1988	Chicago A	197
1989	Chicago A	187
1990	Ontario A	197
1991	Ontario A	200
1992	Georgia A	172
1993	Thomas Jefferson A	190
1994	New York City A	183
1995	New York City A	126
1996	San Francisco Bay Area A	179
1997	Minnesota Gold	125
1998	Massachusetts A	171
1999	San Francisco Bay Area A	187
2000	Chicago A/San Francisco Bay Area A (tie)	172
2001	San Francisco Bay Area A	191
2002	Thomas Jefferson A	190
2003	Thomas Jefferson A	155
2004	Thomas Jefferson A	166
2005	Lehigh Valley Fire	172
2006	North Carolina A	186
2007	Phillips Exeter Red	171
2008	New York City A	170
2009	Lehigh Valley Fire	215
2010	Lehigh Valley Fire	204
2011	Lehigh Valley Fire	232
2012	North Carolina A	223
2013	San Francisco Bay Area A	234
2014	PEARL (Phillips Exeter Academy Red Lions) A	260
2015	San Francisco Bay Area A	211
2016	San Francisco Bay Area A	210
2017	San Francisco Bay Area A	245
2018	Thomas Jefferson High School for Science and Technology A1	234
2019	Thomas Jefferson High School for Science and Technology A1	245
2021	SFBA / NorCal Pink	259
2022	SFBA / NorCal A1	249
2023	SFBA / NorCal A1	223
2024	Lehigh Valley A1	229
2025	Lehigh Valley A1	234
2026	Texas Gold	236

== Past individual winners ==
Year	Team
1977	Randal Dougherty (Fairfax County/Montgomery County)
1978	Fred Helenius (New York City A)
1979	Irwin Jungreis (New York City A)
1980	Paul Feldman (New York City A)
1981	Benji Fisher (New York City A)
1982	Noam Elkies (New York City A)
1983	David Zuckerman (New York City A)
1984	Mike Reid (New York City A)
1985	Ken Fan (Montgomery County, Maryland A)
1986	John Overdeck (Howard County A)
1987	Danny Cory (North Carolina)
1988	Michael Zieve (Greater Richmond)
1989	Sam Vandervelde (Lynchburg/Harrisonburg)
1990	Akira Negi (North Carolina)
1991	Andrew Schultz (Chicago A)
1992	Robert Kleinberg (Upstate New York)
1993	Jeremy Bem (Upstate New York)
1994	Noam Shazeer (Massachusetts A)
1995	Daniel Stronger (New York City A)
1996	Nathan Curtis (Thomas Jefferson A)
1997	Davesh Maulik (Nassau A)
1998	Gabriel Carroll (San Francisco Bay Area A)
1999	Gabriel Carroll (San Francisco Bay Area A)
2000	Tiankai Liu (San Francisco Bay Area A)
2001	Gabriel Carroll (San Francisco Bay Area A)
2002	Ruozhou Jia (Chicago A)
2003	Anders Kaseorg (North Carolina A)
2004	Aaron Pixton (Upstate New York A)
2005	Ryan Ko (Phillips Exeter A)
2006	Samuel Dittmer (Indiana Gold)
2007	Tao Ran Chen (New York City A)
2008	Qin Xuan Pan (Montgomery A)
2009	Zhuo Qun (Alex) Song (Ontario West)
2010	Ben Gunby (Georgetown Day School)
2011	Zhuo Qun (Alex) Song (Ontario West)
2012	Allen Liu (Upstate New York)
2013	Allen Liu (Upstate New York)
2014	Darryl Wu (Washington A)
2015	Brice Huang (West-Windsor Plainsboro A)
2016	Daniel Kim (Bergen County Academies)
2017	Brian Reinhart (Florida A - Oxbridge Academy)
2018	Luke Robitaille (Texas A1)
2019	David Chen (Thomas Jefferson A1)
2021	Luke Robitaille (Texas A1 Gold)
2022	Luke Robitaille (Texas A1 Gold) and Christopher Qiu (Lehigh Valley A1)
2023	Sargam Mondal (Central Jersey A1)
2024	Alexander Wang (Lehigh Valley A1)
2025	Christopher Qiu (Central Jersey A1)
2026	Channing Yang (Texas Gold)
