= Vestal High School =

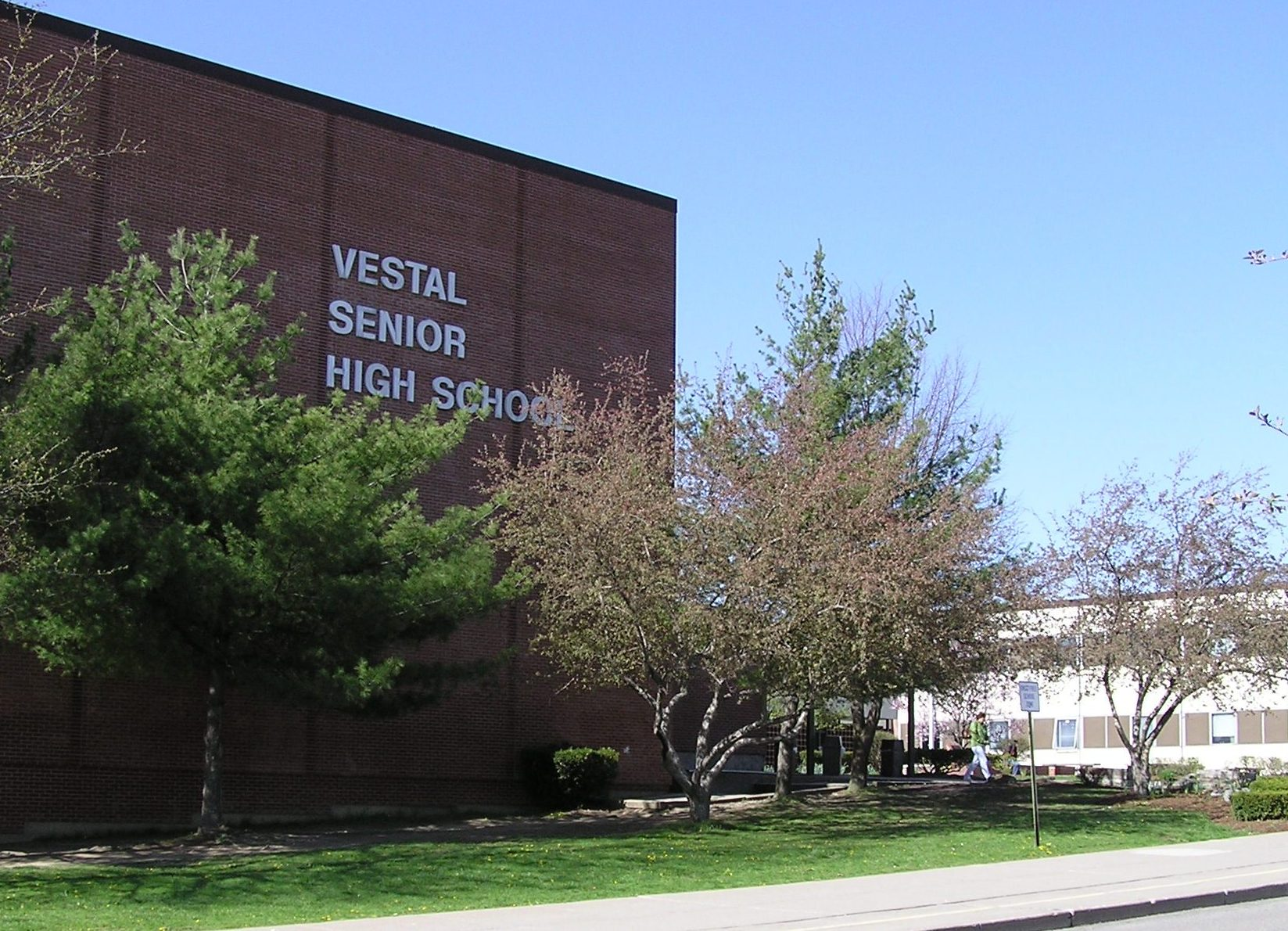

Location
- 205 Woodlawn Dr; Vestal, New York 13850; 42.084262°N 76.045145°W

Information
- Type: Public
- Established: 1960
- NCES School ID: 362961003992
- Principal: Dawn F. Young
- Staff: 89.63 (FTE)
- Enrollment: 1,000 (2022–23)
- Student to teacher ratio: 11.16
- Campus: Suburban
- Colors: Green and Gold
- Mascot: Golden Bear
- Website: www.vestalcsd.org/85167_2

Vestal High School is a public high school that operates as part of the Vestal Central School District which encompasses 57 square miles (150 km^{2}) just west of Binghamton in the Southern Tier of New York. It is a four-year comprehensive school. The high school offers Varsity and Junior Varsity sports as well as musical opportunities in orchestra, band, and chorus. Clubs and student organizations accommodate a wide range of interests The mascot of Vestal High School is the Golden Bear named Bruin. Vestal High School holds an annual dance named after the mascot called the King Bruin dance, or KB. Unlike most high schools, Vestal High School does not have a Homecoming dance, but instead a football game and later in the year the King Bruin dance. The school also houses a food pantry, with fundraisers encouraging the student body to donate occurring throughout the school year.

== Academics ==
Vestal High School is one of the only two schools in the Binghamton area to offer the International Baccalaureate (IB) program. It has been an IB World School since January 1998. Advanced Placement (AP) courses are also offered. In general, over 225 courses are offered to students. Vestal High School was ranked #494 on the 2007 Newsweek list of the top 1,200 high schools in the United States based on participation of students in AP and IB programs. Many students have qualified for the National Merit Scholarship Program with a total of six finalists in 2006. Languages taught include French and Spanish.

=== Diplomas ===
==== International Baccalaureate ====
The IB Program began during the 1999–2000 school year.

| Requirements | International Baccalaureate Diploma | Vestal Honors Diploma |
|---|---|---|
| Courses | Six IB Courses, (3 or 4 at higher level and remainder at standard level); Complete exams in each course; Completed in Grades 11 & 12 | One from each of these five subject groups: English, Second Language, Individuals and Societies, Science, Mathematics.; One Arts & Electives or an additional course from Individuals and Societies or Experimental Science |
| Theory of Knowledge (TOK) | Two semesters over junior and senior years | |
| Project / Extended Essay | Complete 4000 word extended essay based on original research | |
| Creativity, Action, Service | Complete 150 hours of extracurricular activities distributed across the arts, sports, volunteer services in Grades 11 & 12 | |

The program has become increasingly popular at Vestal High School with the majority of the students taking at least one AP, IB, or Honors course. In 2005, 259 students took 327 AP exams with 200 IB exams also administered. During the 2022–2023 academic year, 50% of juniors and seniors took at least one AP or IB course, with 4 students graduating with the full IB diploma.

==== Scholar Certificate ====
VHS has introduced a new honor titled The Vestal Scholar Certificate. It offers special recognition to students who successfully complete a rigorous program of study. To be eligible, a student must take and pass a minimum of six IB, AP, or Excelsior College courses. This is to replace the Honors diploma, as it is the same thing, minus several requirements.

==== Regents ====
The Regents Diploma is the standard high school diploma received by students in New York State. It involves passing a series of Regents Examinations given by the New York State Department of Education. There is also a Regents Diploma with Advanced Designation for students who are willing to take additional courses.

Academic Awards

New York State Seal of Civic Readiness

The Seal of Civic Readiness is awarded by the New York State Education Department to students who have shown proficiency in both civic knowledge and civic participation. Criteria for the award includes completion of Social Studies classes, Regents Exam scores, a research project, service projects, and more.

149 seniors in the 2022–2023 academic year earned the Seal of Civic Readiness.

New York State Seal of Biliteracy

The Seal of Biliteracy is awarded to students who demonstrate proficiency in English and another language. Students are able to earn multiple rewards if they demonstrate the adequate level of proficiency in multiple non-English languages.

22 seniors in the 2022–2023 academic year earned at least one Seal of Biliteracy.

== News ==
=== Vestal Facilities Project ===
The Vestal Central School District upgraded the deteriorating conditions of all the buildings within the district through a $54,841,000 project. Work began in the summer of 2006 and has since been completed.

As of December 2006, both the auditorium and gymnasium were completed and open for public use. Over the 2007 summer vacation, the gymnasium floor was re-done due to improper installation.

Work was completed on the school's track and football stadium partially through the fall season. As a result, the Homecoming game was the first game played in the new stadium.

A new wing was added during the course of the 07–08 school year and was opened for students to tour during the last week of that school year. It featured many new classrooms, each with its own Smartboard and a whole-wall white board.

Renovations on the pool and its associated locker room areas began in April 2007.

- Reason For The Facilities Project

- All of the buildings required replacing and upgrading, especially the high school, which was built in 1960 with only minor renovations.
- More classroom space was needed to meet changing academic programs and graduation requirements
- The facilities were not designed to meet current security requirements.
- All of the athletic fields, tracks, and playgrounds needed improvement
- Auditorium space was insufficient, with only two auditoriums out of the seven buildings in the district.

- Key Components of the Plan

- Renovations and building improvements at all district facilities.
- Additional classroom space at the high school and middle school.
- Construction of a 1,200 seat auditorium at the middle school
- Replacement and renovation of elementary school playgrounds.
- Construction of an eight lane track and artificial turf at high school
- New athletic fields at the high school and middle school
- Major improvements to the football stadium at the high school

== Extracurricular activities ==
=== Athletics ===
Sports Include: Football, Tennis, Golf, Cross Country, Volleyball, Field Hockey, Cheerleading, Soccer, Swimming, Bowling, Basketball, Indoor track, Wrestling, Baseball, Softball, Lacrosse, Track and Field, and club Ice Hockey.

The boys' soccer team completed a 20–0 season in 2017 by winning the State Class A Championship over Queensbury. In 2007 the Vestal Boys' Soccer team captured the Class AA New York State Championship. The first boys' soccer team to capture a New York State title and be ranked # 1 in New York State was in 1982, and in 1985 the team were co-champs with North Babylon.

=== Notable Clubs ===
- Mathletes

The Mathletes are a competitive group of mathematicians who participate in local meets at Johnson City High School and in the New York State Mathematics League (NYSML) Contest. Many members of Mathletes also qualify to participate in the New York State Mathletes Competition. In 2006, Vestal High School scored the third highest in Broome County. The Mathletes also sponsor the annual American Mathematics Competition (AMC), which is the first in the series of competitions to determine the United States Math Team who competes in the International Mathematical Olympiad (IMO). A 2004 graduate of Vestal High School, Aaron Pixton scored a perfect score on the AMC three times from 2002-2004. He went on to the IMO in 2003 and 2004 to win a gold medal.

- Mock Trial

The Mock Trial team consists of a competitive group of students who participate in imitated trials. The Vestal High School team was a semi-finalist in the 2005 statewide Mock Trial Tournament. The 2007 Mock Trial team won County Finals and Regionals and advanced to the state tournament in Albany. They placed 5th in the state at the competition under Thomas Bolton Walls.

- Science Olympiad

There are two competitive Science Olympiad teams at Vestal (A/B). Team A has often placed in the top five at the state competition in previous few years; The New York State Science Olympiad competition is traditionally held at West Point. In the 2005-2006 school year, Team A placed first at the Goshen Invitational competition. At the Southern Tier Regional Competition, Team A came in first place, while Team B earned a fourth place finish. Team A competed in the New York State competition at West Point Military Academy on March 11, 2006. Vestal earned a fifth place finish for the second consecutive year.

- Talent Fest

Vestal High School is locally noted for its annual Talent Show, or "Talent Fest". Vestal's Talent Fest is known for the high quality of the student acts, the charisma and professional nature of the emcees, and the traditional talent fest emcee videos featured during the introduction and intermission of the program.

In 2011, Talent Fest was further highlighted by a professional video affirmation created by drummer Abe Laboriel Jr.

=== Music ===
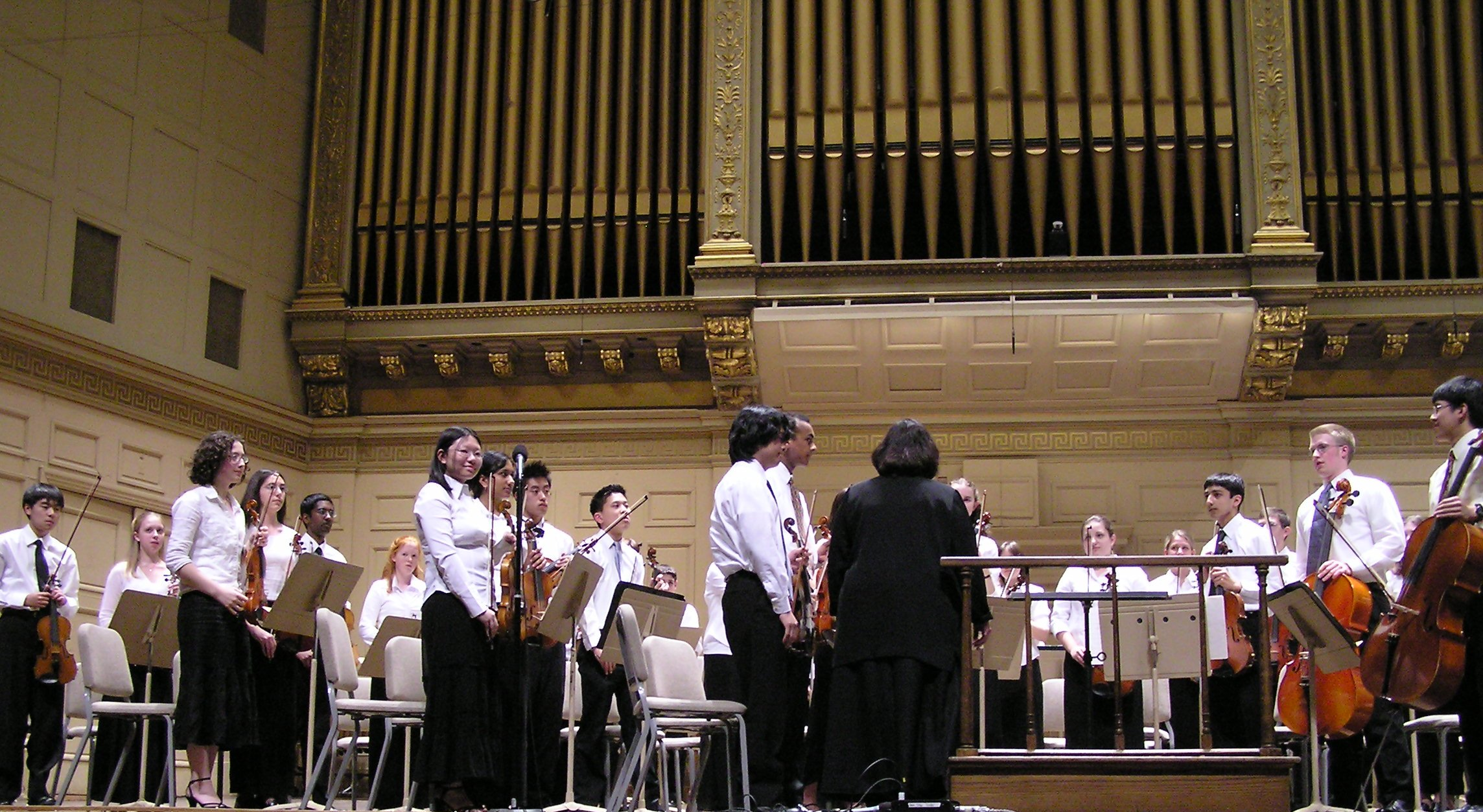
Vestal High School Orchestra in Boston's Symphony Hall Competing at the Festival of Gold in 2005

Vestal High School has a strong music program. Many students have auditioned successfully in the New York State Schools Music Association (NYSSMA), with a few selected into All-State Festival ensembles, and a nationwide honors orchestra at the Festival of Gold conducted by Keith Lockhart, the conductor of the Boston Pops Orchestra. Many also participate in the Broome County Music Educators Association (BCMEA) Festival and the Binghamton Youth Symphony Orchestra (BYSO).

- Band

There are several band groups in Vestal High School including a Concert Band, Freshman Band, Jazz Band, and Marching Band. The Concert Band consists of students in grades 10-12 who participate in yearly adjudications at the NYSSMA major organizations festival and has obtained consistent high marks there. Jazz Band is a unique group of students in grades 9-12 because nearly all the musicians in the organization are playing a second instrument.

- Chorus

Vestal High School has both a Concert Chorus and a select ensemble known as Vestal Voices. The Vestal Voices is a chorus of students in grades 10-12 who often participate in NYSSMA. In the spring of 2006, the Vestal Voices attended the Heritage Festival in Virginia Beach and won the gold award. For the Heritage Festival in the spring of 2014 in Washington DC the Vestal Voices won 3rd Gold.

- Orchestra

The Vestal High School Orchestra is a string group consisting of players in grades 9-12, under the direction of Marissa Crabb. The orchestra has performed at Symphony Hall in Boston. The group consistently earns awards at NYSSMA and plays either level 5 or level 6 repertoire. The orchestra also attended the Heritage Festival in Washington DC and won First Gold.

=== Art ===
The art department at Vestal High School has fostered some of the best student artists in the area. In 2011, many students were named finalists and runners-up at the 2011 Arnot Art Museum ceremony, including a Gold Key Award by Dillon Utter, class of 2011.

== Notable alumni ==
| Name | Class year | Notability | Reference(s) |
|---|---|---|---|
| Linda Swartz Taglialatela | 1949 | United States Ambassador to Antigua and Barbuda and other nations of the Organisation of Eastern Caribbean States (2016–2023) | |
| Laurence Leamer | 1959 | Best-selling author and journalist; known for works on the Kennedy family including The Kennedy Women and The Kennedy Men | |
| Tom M. Mitchell | 1969 | Carnegie Mellon University professor; leading expert in machine learning, artificial intelligence, and cognitive neuroscience | |
| Daniel W. Bursch | 1975 | NASA astronaut; veteran of multiple space missions including long-duration stay aboard the International Space Station | |
| Cal Harris | | Businessman and former lacrosse player; became known for high-profile court cases following the 2001 disappearance of his wife | |
| Peter Robinson | 1975 | Author, television host, and former White House speechwriter; wrote President Ronald Reagan’s famous “Tear down this wall!” address | |
| Steve Perry (Oregon musician) | 1981 | Lead vocalist and songwriter for the multi-platinum band Cherry Poppin' Daddies, best known for Zoot Suit Riot | |
| Stacey Campfield | 1986 | Tennessee State senator noted for his outspoken and often controversial remarks on public policy | |
| Brian L. DeMarco | 1992 | Physicist who co-created the first Fermionic condensate with Deborah S. Jin; professor at the University of Illinois at Urbana–Champaign | |
| Aaron Pixton | 2004 | Mathematician at the University of Michigan specializing in enumerative geometry; 3 time Putnam Fellow | |
