= Laurence Leamer =

American author and journalist

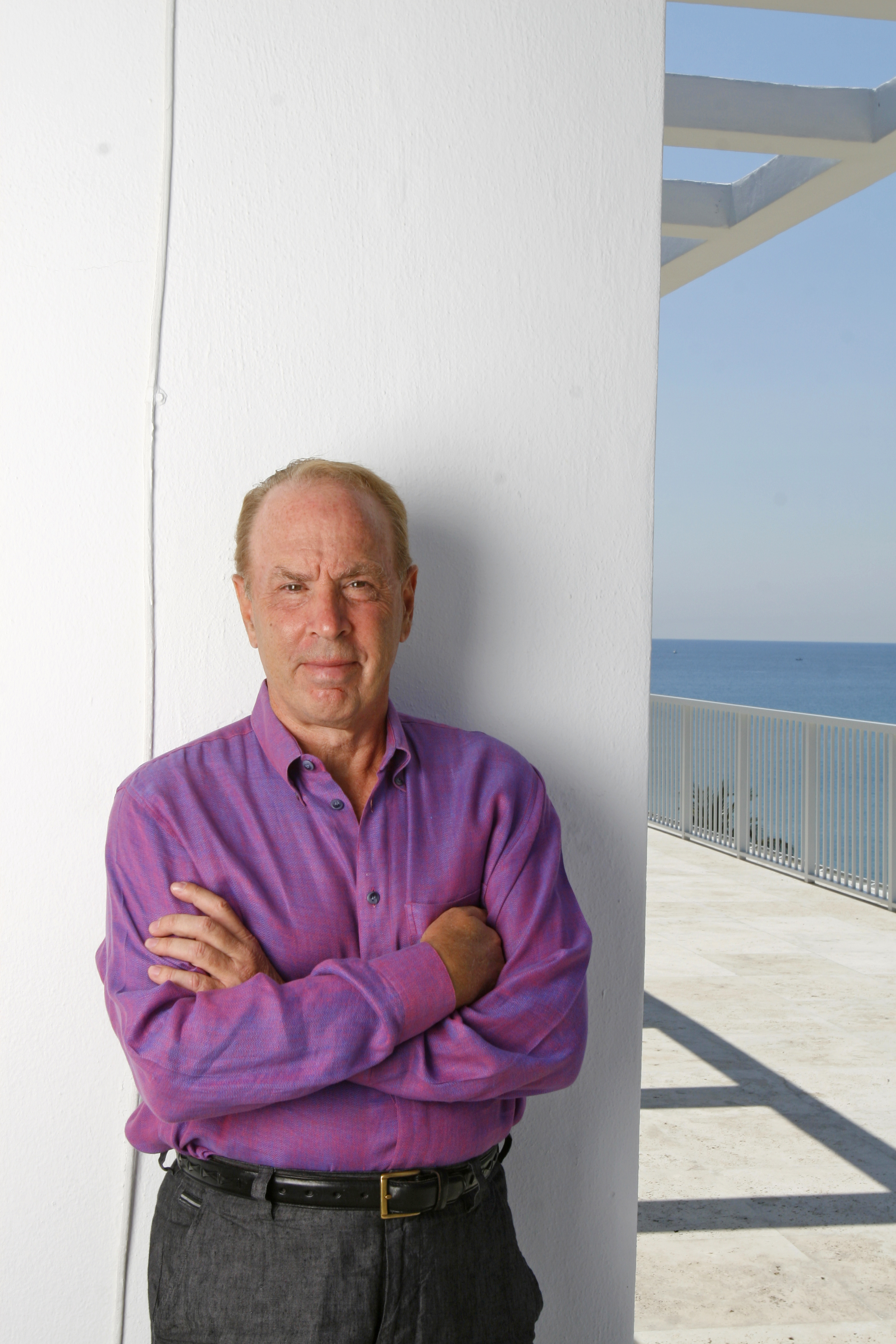
- Leamer in 2007
- Born: October 30, 1941 (age 83); Chicago, Illinois, U.S.
- Education: Antioch College (B.A.)
- Occupations: Non-fiction author, journalist
- Spouse: Vesna Obradovic
- Children: 1
- Writing career
- Period: 1969-present
- Genres: American politics, biography
- Website: www.leamer.com

Laurence Leamer (born October 30, 1941) is an American author and journalist. Leamer is a former Ford Fellow in International Development at the University of Oregon and a former International Fellow at Columbia University. He is regarded as an expert on the Kennedy family and has appeared in numerous media outlets discussing American politics. Leamer has also written best-selling biographies of other Americans, including Johnny Carson, the Reagan family, and Arnold Schwarzenegger. He has also written a book about Donald Trump's historical resort, Mar-a-Lago. His book, Capote's Women, was a national bestseller, and was adapted as the second season of Feud, starring Naomi Watts and directed by Gus Van Sant.

== Biography ==
Leamer was born in Chicago and later moved to upstate New York with his family, where he attended Vestal Central High School. He attended Antioch College, where he spent a year in France, studied at the Université de Besançon, and worked in a factory. He received his B.A. in History from Antioch, in 1964. After his graduation, Leamer joined the Peace Corps and was stationed in the mountains of Nepal. When he returned home, Leamer studied both at the University of Oregon and the Columbia University School of Journalism, where he graduated second in his class, in 1969, while being named a Pulitzer International Fellow.

After finishing at Columbia, Leamer worked as an associate editor at Newsweek, before turning to writing magazine articles for a range of publications, including Harper's, The New York Times Magazine, and Playboy. During this period, Leamer worked in a coal mine in West Virginia, while researching an article. During the Indo-Pakistani War of 1971, he was the only journalist to live in a Bengali hotel in Dacca and travel to remote areas of the newborn Bangladesh. His article in Harper's won a citation from the Overseas Press Club for "Best Magazine Reporting".

== Work ==
Leamer's writings on the Kennedy family have achieved considerable popularity. For instance, The Kennedy Women was the main selection of the Book of the Month Club and reached number two on the New York Times Best Seller list. His other Kennedy biography, The Kennedy Men, was also a New York Times bestseller.

He has been interviewed by NBC Nightly News, The New York Times, CNN, and NPR, to lend his expertise to matters concerning the Kennedys, Ronald Reagan, and American politics. In the period following the death of John F. Kennedy Jr., Leamer served as the on-air consultant for MSNBC's coverage of the plane crash and subsequent funeral. He, again, served as a consultant, during the coverage of former President Ronald Reagan's funeral.

Leamer has, also, written a biography of Johnny Carson titled King of the Night, which spent over six weeks on the New York Times Best Seller list. In writing his novel, Assignment, Leamer lived in Peru for two years, to research the cocaine trade. He, again, immersed himself in his topic, when he moved to Nashville to research the business and lifestyle of country music and its many stars for Three Chords and the Truth. Each of the books were lauded for the depth of their research. Leamer's work on the life of famed mountaineer Willi Unsoeld was purchased by Robert Redford's production company.

== Personal life ==
Leamer is married to Vesna Obradovic, who assists him with the research for his books. The author has one daughter, Daniela, and two grandchildren. The couple maintain residences in Palm Beach, Florida and Washington, D.C. Leamer's late brother, Edward, was an economics professor at UCLA, the Chauncey J. Medberry Chair in Management, and director of the UCLA Anderson Forecast. His other brother, Robert, is an attorney and executive vice president of a Brooklyn-based long-term care health system.

== Books ==
- The Paper Revolutionaries: The Rise of the Underground Press – 1972
- Playing for Keeps in Washington – 1977
- Assignment – 1979
- Ascent: The Spiritual and Physical Quest of Willi Unsoeld – 1982
- Make-Believe: The Story of Nancy and Ronald Reagan – 1983
- As Time Goes By: The Life of Ingrid Bergman – 1986
- King of the Night: The Life of Johnny Carson – 1989
- The Kennedy Women: The Saga of an American Family – 1994
- Three Chords and the Truth: Hope, Heartbreak, and Changing Fortunes in Nashville – 1997
- The Kennedy Men 1901–1963: The Laws of the Father – 2001
- Sons of Camelot: The Fate of an American Dynasty- 2004
- Fantastic: The Life of Arnold Schwarzenegger – 2005
- Madness Under the Royal Palms: Love and Death Behind the Gates of Palm Beach – 2009
- The Price of Justice: A True Story of Corruption and Greed in Coal Country – 2013
- The Lynching: The Epic Courtroom Battle That Brought Down the Klan – 2016
- The President's Butler – 2016
- Mar-A-Lago: Inside the Gates of Power at Donald Trump's Presidential Palace – 2019
- Capote's Women: A True Story of Love, Betrayal, and a Swan Song for an Era – 2021
- Hitchcock's Blondes: The Unforgettable Women Behind the Legendary Director's Dark Obsession – 2023
- Warhol's Muses: The Artists, Misfits, and Superstars Destroyed by the Factory Fame Machine - 2025
- Ladies' Man: The Careless Heart of John F. Kennedy - 2026
