= Vestal Central School =

- U.S. National Register of Historic Places
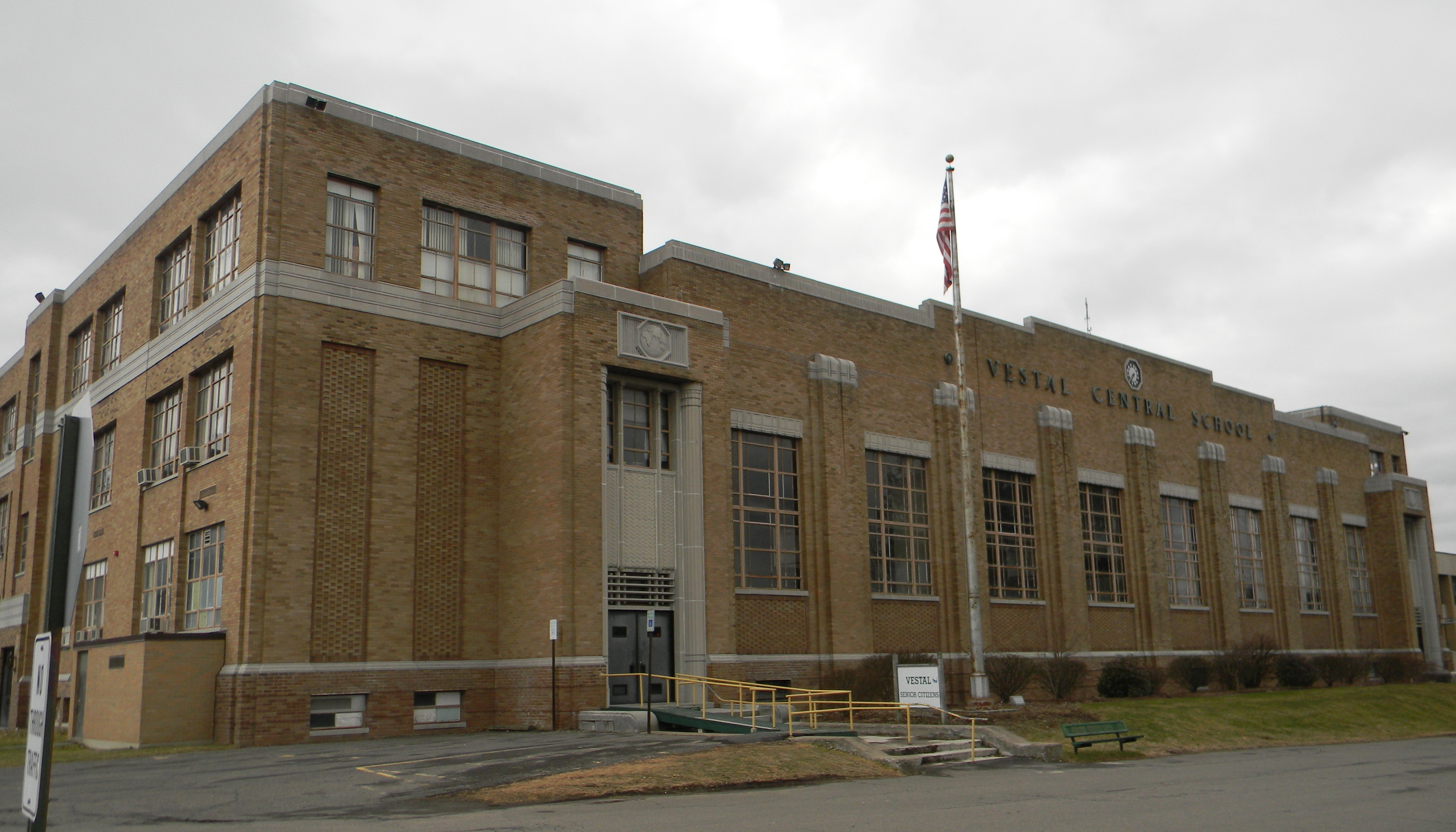
- Vestal Central School, February 2012

- Location within New York Location within the United States
- Location: 201 Main Street, Vestal, New York
- Coordinates: 42°5′5.26″N 76°3′4.85″W
- Area: 12 acres (4.9 ha)
- Built: 1939
- Architect: A. T. Lacey & Sons
- Architectural style: Art Deco
- NRHP reference No.: 10000023
- Added to NRHP: February 22, 2010

Vestal Central School, also known as Central Junior High School, is a historic school building located at Vestal in Broome County, New York, United States. It was built in 1939 and is a large three- to four-story, modified U-shaped structure. It is built of variegated brick over cinder block with a steel frame and a reinforced concrete foundation. The interior features a number of Art Deco style details. Also on the property is the original bus garage built in 1950. The school is now occupied by the Vestal Senior Center, Evergreen Alternative High School, several small businesses, and administrative offices of the Vestal Central School District.

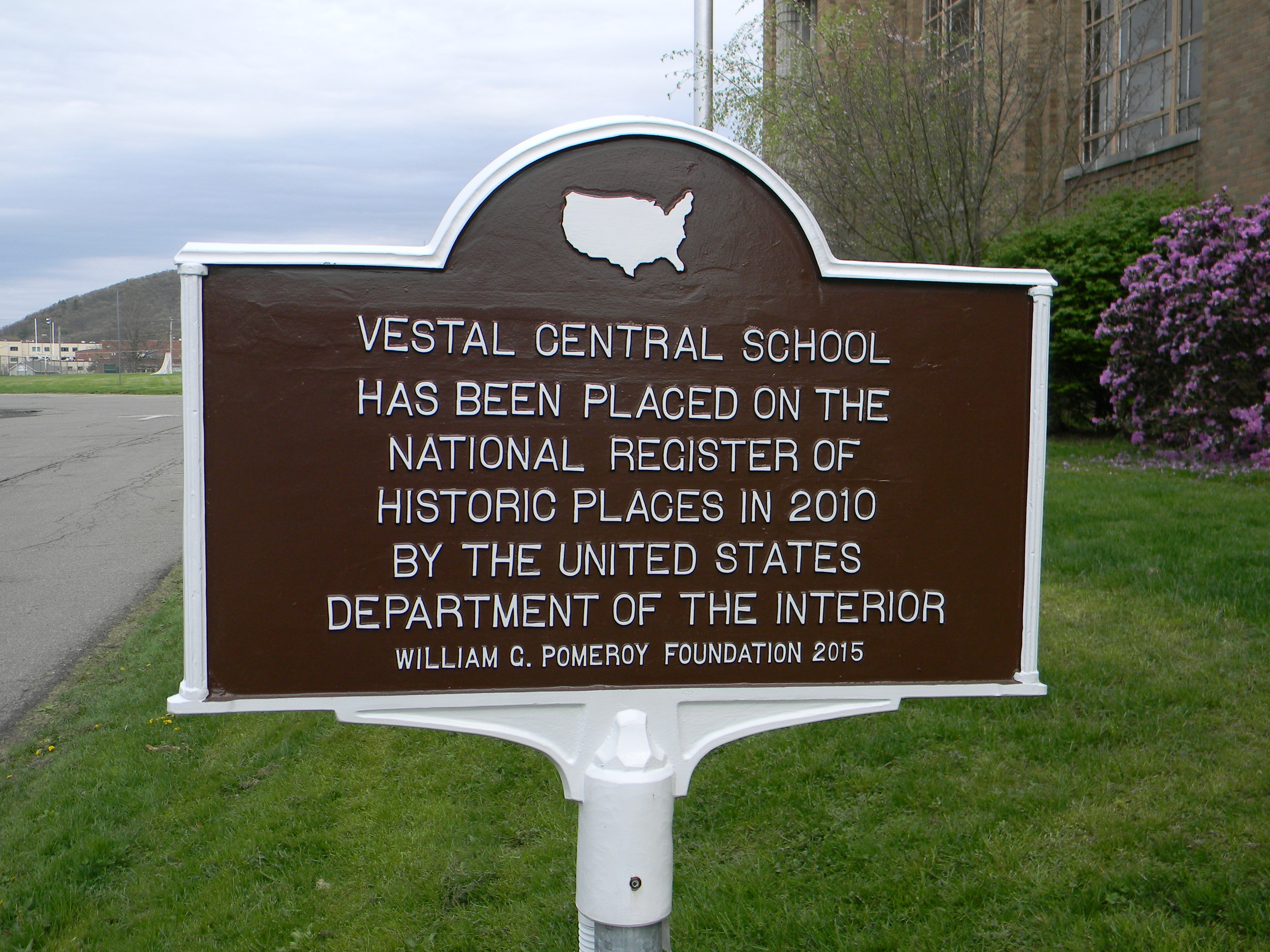
Plaque installed in front of the school in 2015

It was listed on the National Register of Historic Places in 2010.
