= Rahul Pandharipande =

Professor of mathematics (born 1969)

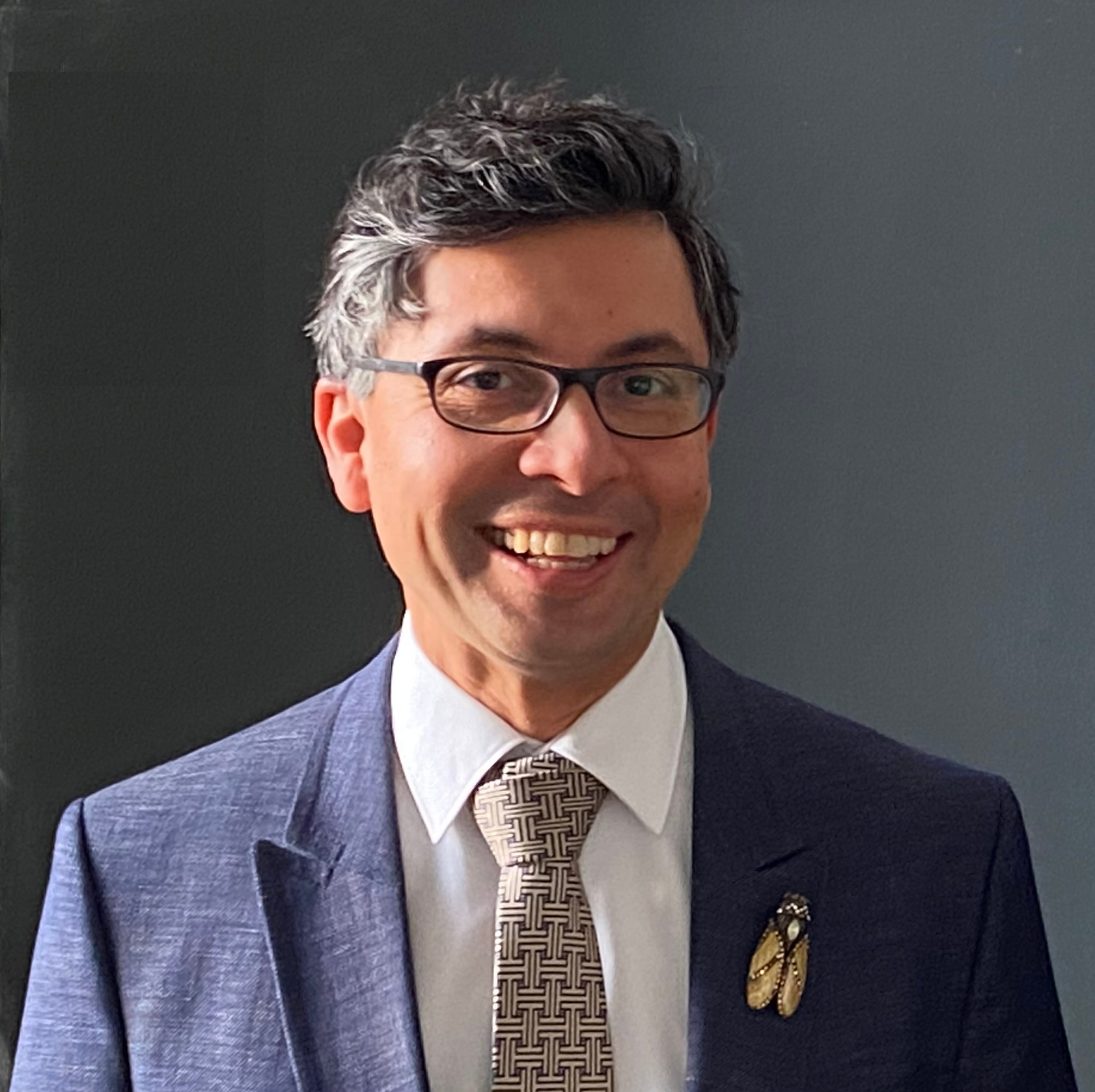
- Rahul Pandharipande (2021)
- Born: 1969 (age 56–57); Amravati, Maharashtra, India
- Education: Princeton University; Harvard University
- Awards: Clay Research Award (2013); Infosys Prize (2013)
- Scientific career
- Fields: Mathematics
- Workplaces: ETH Zurich; Princeton University; Caltech; University of Chicago
- Doctoral advisor: Joe Harris
- Doctoral students: Aaron Pixton

Rahul Vijay Pandharipande (born 1969) is a Portuguese-Indian professor of mathematics at the Swiss Federal Institute of Technology Zürich (ETH) working in algebraic geometry. His particular interests concern moduli spaces, enumerative invariants associated to moduli spaces, such as Gromov–Witten invariants and Donaldson–Thomas invariants, and the cohomology of the moduli space of curves. His father Vijay Raghunath Pandharipande was a renowned theoretical physicist who worked in the area of nuclear physics.

== Educational and professional history ==
He received his A.B. from Princeton University in 1990 and his PhD from Harvard University in 1994 with a thesis entitled `A Compactification over the Moduli Space of Stable Curves of the Universal Moduli Space of Slope-Semistable Vector Bundles'. His thesis advisor at Harvard was Joe Harris. After teaching at the University of Chicago and the California Institute of Technology, he joined the faculty as Professor of Mathematics at Princeton University in 2002. In 2011, he accepted a Professorship at ETH Zürich. In 2022, he was awarded an honorary degree - Doctor of Science from the University of Illinois Urbana-Champaign.

== Personal life ==
Pandharipande is married to mathematician Ana Cannas da Silva.
