= Madness Under the Royal Palms =

2009 book by Laurence Leamer

Madness Under the Royal Palms: Love and Death Behind the Gates of Palm Beach
- First edition
- Author: Laurence Leamer
- Language: English
- Subject: Palm Beach society
- Publisher: Hyperion
- Publication date: January 20, 2009
- Publication place: United States
- Media type: Print (hardcover)
- Pages: 368
- ISBN: 1-4013-2291-3
- OCLC: 232977781

Madness Under the Royal Palms: Love and Death Behind the Gates of Palm Beach is a book by author Laurence Leamer, published by Hyperion, and released on January 20, 2009.

== Overview ==
The book is a historical and anthropological study of Palm Beach, Florida, the social cliques and special interests; and biographies of some of the notable residents who, according to Leamer, represent the Palm Beach experience.

Palm Beach is an island to the East of West Palm Beach, connected to the mainland by a series of bridges over the Intracoastal Waterway. It is also a social island and shares little resemblance with the mainland. It is home to some of the wealthiest families in the world, including Donald Trump and a high density of billionaires.

== Description ==
Author Laurence Leamer drew inspiration from his time spent in Palm Beach for over a decade. In Madness Under the Royal Palms, Leamer writes about the inner lives of high society. Its themes include the conflict between old money and new, religion and status, and the romantic and sexual intertwinings of the upper class network.

Madness Under the Royal Palms has generated a many controversies including supposed threats against Leamer's life and confrontations on the streets of Palm Beach recorded by a news camera.

Leamer has spoke about the matter multiple times, most notably in a lengthy interview for WGBH Public Television in Boston.

== Palm Beach under a microscope ==
In Madness Under the Royal Palms, Leamer, best known for his bestsellers including The Kennedy Women, looks at the way wealth makes its own rules and how it creates a culture of privilege untouched by the rules governing most Americans. He was given unprecedented access to the tightly controlled hierarchy in Palm Beach's coveted inner sanctums. He reveals the lives of the men and women who have come to this exclusive island off the coast of Florida with big ambitions and even larger checkbooks. He covers the contested memberships in the "right" clubs to the rise of Trump's Mar-a-Lago which leveled long-standing barriers with its glitz and celebration of new glamour. He writes about the architecture wars -— when the high social value of buying one of the "grand old" homes shifted to knocking those old houses down and the race to build mega-mansions in their place. He also captures the uneasy alliances that fuel marriages -– including the successive trophy wives – to the rancorous and even fatal divorces.

Leamer's Madness Under the Royal Palms shows that money cannot buy happiness. As Leamer writes, "in Palm Beach, people chased after happiness, but like dogs chasing a mechanical rabbit in a greyhound race, no matter how fast they ran, happiness was just a few inches in front of their noses."

== Lessons from the book ==
In the end, Leamer's tale reveals a darker strain. As he discovers the desperate hunger a billionaire has for acceptance that may never come, or the aging beauty's struggle to redefine and keep a place in this society, he also captures a pathos and humanity in many of his subjects. There are characters that range from the doyenne of the modern drawing room who forgoes a marriage with family attending and flies to New Zealand so that Prince Philip and Prince Edward might be present instead; the skinflint billionaire who kidnaps his first children, rewrites his own history, and then plots spectacularly against his fifth wife with a prenuptial that would have her paying him if she leaves; to the small-town daughter of a cop who becomes the gatekeeper for it all, the society columnist for the local newspaper.

== Controversy & the Madoff scandal ==
The Bernie Madoff scandal put Leamer's book centerstage, as Madoff was a trusted member of the wealthy Jewish community. According to Leamer, Madoff had made inroads to the Jewish elite of Boston, who unwittingly vouched for him after he gained their trust. Many members of the Palm Beach Jewish community were wiped out by Madoff's Ponzi scheme, and this has purportedly generated a lot of resentment for Leamer, who has been publicly speaking on the particular impact the scandal has had on the Palm Beach community.

== Other controversies ==
The author created a row in Palm Beach when he accused the society editor of the Palm Beach Daily News, Shannon Donnelly, of receiving a gift (or gifts) from a wealthy socialite in exchange for coverage that would elevate the resident's social status. The newspaper has defended Donnelly, and the allegations were investigated and deemed to be unfounded. Publisher Joyce Reingold has criticized Madness Under the Royal Palms of inaccuracies, although specific examples were not made.

As a result of the book's popularity, Leamer has been interviewed by numerous media associations, and has openly discussed touchy subjects including the social psychology of the island's Jewish community, anti-Semitism among the White Anglo-Saxon Protestants (WASPs), the "old money" disdain for new money, including resident and Mar-a-Lago owner Trump, and a tiered caste-type system among the wealthy as reflected in the exclusive clubs.

Leamer discusses the social scene and the backgrounds of the island's high society clubs including Mar-a-Lago, the Palm Beach Country Club and the Bath & Tennis Club. In his book, he claims that the elite organizations have very exclusive and discriminating acceptance policies. As a response to Leamer's portrayal of the Palm Beach Country Club, a place where Leamer says he had often been invited as a dinner guest, Leamer claims he was blacklisted from ever entering the club. Leamer has not specifically criticized the Palm Beach Jewish community, but many members have expressed outrage over his comments and have interpreted his words as an ethnic attack. The author has responded by stating that he is also a Palm Beach resident, with many close Jewish friends and associates; his description of the social structure, he claims, are anthropological and social observations that are common knowledge among the local community. Leamer pays many accolades to the philanthropic contributions of the Palm Beach Jewish community both in his book and in the subsequent interviews. In his WGBH interview, Leamer stated that Madoff's impact on charities is a testimony to the charitable benefactors in the Jewish community. Had many of the Madoff investors not been Jewish, according to Leamer, the charities would not have felt such an impact. In the interview, Leamer spoke very highly of the intellectual Jewish community of Boston, who represented a large number of the Jewish elite in Palm Beach.
