= Vestal Central School District =

School district in New York, United States

Address
- 201 Main Street Vestal, New York, 13850; United States

District information
- Type: Public
- Grades: K–12
- NCES District ID: 3629610

Students and staff
- Students: 3,315 (2020–2021)
- Teachers: 281.73 (on an FTE basis)
- Staff: 318.58 (on an FTE basis)
- Student–teacher ratio: 11.77:1

Other information
- Website: vestalcsd.org

Vestal Central School District is a school district in Vestal, New York. It covers about 57 square miles (150 km^{2}) west of Binghamton, New York, serving a portion of Apalachin, New York in addition to Vestal, New York. The former Vestal Central School was listed on the National Register of Historic Places in 2010.

== List of Schools ==
- High School (Grades 9–12):
  - Vestal High School
- Middle Schools (Grades 6–8):
  - Vestal Middle School
- Elementary Schools (Grades K-5):
  - African Road Elementary School
  - Clayton Avenue Elementary School
  - Glenwood Elementary School
  - Tioga Hills Elementary School
  - Vestal Hills Elementary School

== See also ==
- List of school districts in New York
