= Aaron Pixton =

American mathematician

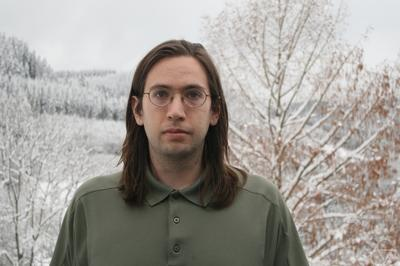
- Pixton at the Workshop Moduli Spaces in Algebraic Geometry, Oberwolfach 2013
- Born: January 13, 1986 (age 40); Binghamton, New York, U.S.
- Education: Princeton University (AB, PhD)
- Awards: Morgan Prize (2009); Putnam Fellow (2004, 2005, 2007)
- Scientific career
- Fields: Mathematics
- Workplaces: Harvard University; Massachusetts Institute of Technology; University of Michigan
- Thesis: The tautological ring of the moduli space of curves (2013)
- Doctoral advisor: Rahul Pandharipande
- Chess career
- Country: United States
- Title: FIDE Master
- Peak rating: 2465 (July 2009)

Aaron C. Pixton (born January 13, 1986) is an American mathematician at the University of Michigan. He works in enumerative geometry, and is also known for his chess playing, where he is a FIDE Master.

== Early life and education ==
Pixton was born in Binghamton, New York; his father, Dennis Pixton, is a retired professor of mathematics at Binghamton University. He grew up in Vestal, New York. While a student at Vestal Senior High School, he scored a perfect score on the American Mathematics Competition three times from 2002 to 2004. He went on to the International Mathematical Olympiad in 2003 and 2004 to win consecutive gold medals.

He received a Bachelor of Arts in 2008 and a Doctor of Philosophy in 2013, both from Princeton University.

While an undergraduate at Princeton University, Pixton was a three-time Putnam Fellow. For his research conducted as an undergraduate, he was awarded the 2009 Morgan Prize. In 2008, he received a Churchill Scholarship to the University of Cambridge. Pixton received his Ph.D. in 2013 from Princeton under the supervision of Rahul Pandharipande; his dissertation was The tautological ring of the moduli space of curves.

== Career ==
Pixton was appointed as a Clay Research Fellow for a term of five years beginning in 2013. After two years as a postdoctoral researcher at Harvard University, he became an assistant professor of mathematics at the Massachusetts Institute of Technology in 2015. In 2017, he received a Sloan Research Fellowship. In 2020, he moved to the University of Michigan as an assistant professor.

== Chess ==
Pixton is also a former child prodigy in chess. He was the 2001 U.S. Cadet Champion and the 2002 US Junior Chess Champion, and had a win against the former US Champion Joel Benjamin in 2003.

== Selected publications ==
- Pandharipande, Rahul; Pixton, Aaron; Zvonkine, Dimitri (2015), "Relations on $\overline{\mathcal{M}}_{g,n}$ via 3-spin structures", Journal of the American Mathematical Society, 28 (1): 279–309, doi:10.1090/S0894-0347-2014-00808-0, MR 3264769
- Janda, Felix; Pandharipande, Rahul; Pixton, Aaron; Zvonkine, Dimitri (2017), "Double ramification cycles on the moduli spaces of curves", Publications Mathématiques de l'IHÉS, 125: 221–266, arXiv:1602.04705, doi:10.1007/s10240-017-0088-x, MR 3668650, S2CID 78089766
- Pandharipande, Rahul; Pixton, Aaron (2017), "Gromov–Witten/Pairs correspondence for the quintic 3-fold", Journal of the American Mathematical Society, 30 (2): 389–449, arXiv:1206.5490, doi:10.1090/jams/858, MR 3600040, S2CID 117481664
- Oberdieck, Georg; Pixton, Aaron (2018), "Holomorphic anomaly equations and the Igusa cusp form conjecture", Inventiones Mathematicae, 213 (2): 507–587, arXiv:1706.10100, Bibcode:2018InMat.213..507O, doi:10.1007/s00222-018-0794-0, MR 3827207, S2CID 3616255
