= Vestal, New York =

Town in Broome County, New York, US

- Town
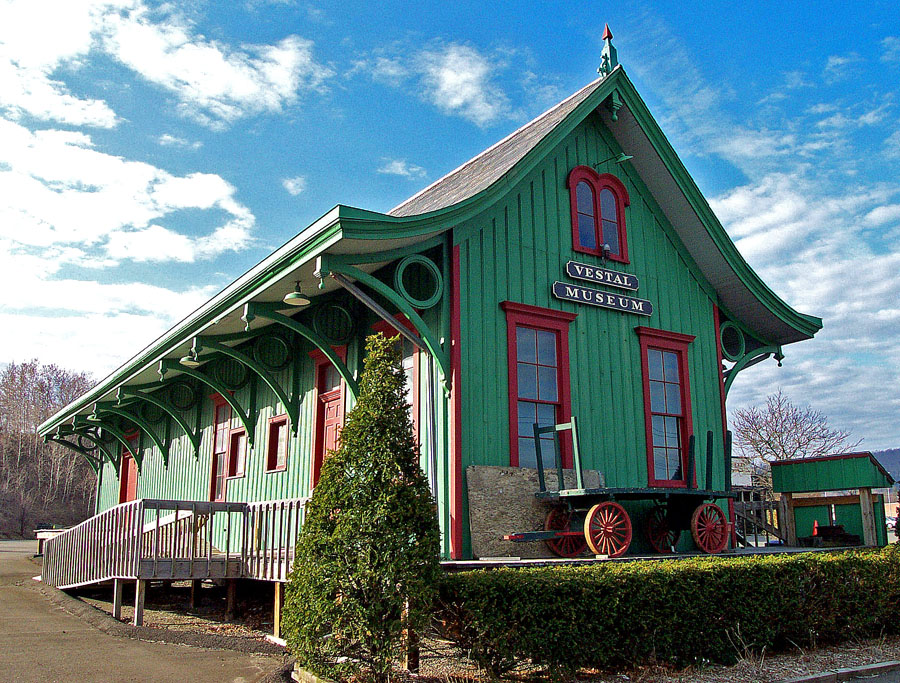
- Vestal DLW station, today refashioned as the Vestal Museum (2006)

- Seal Logo

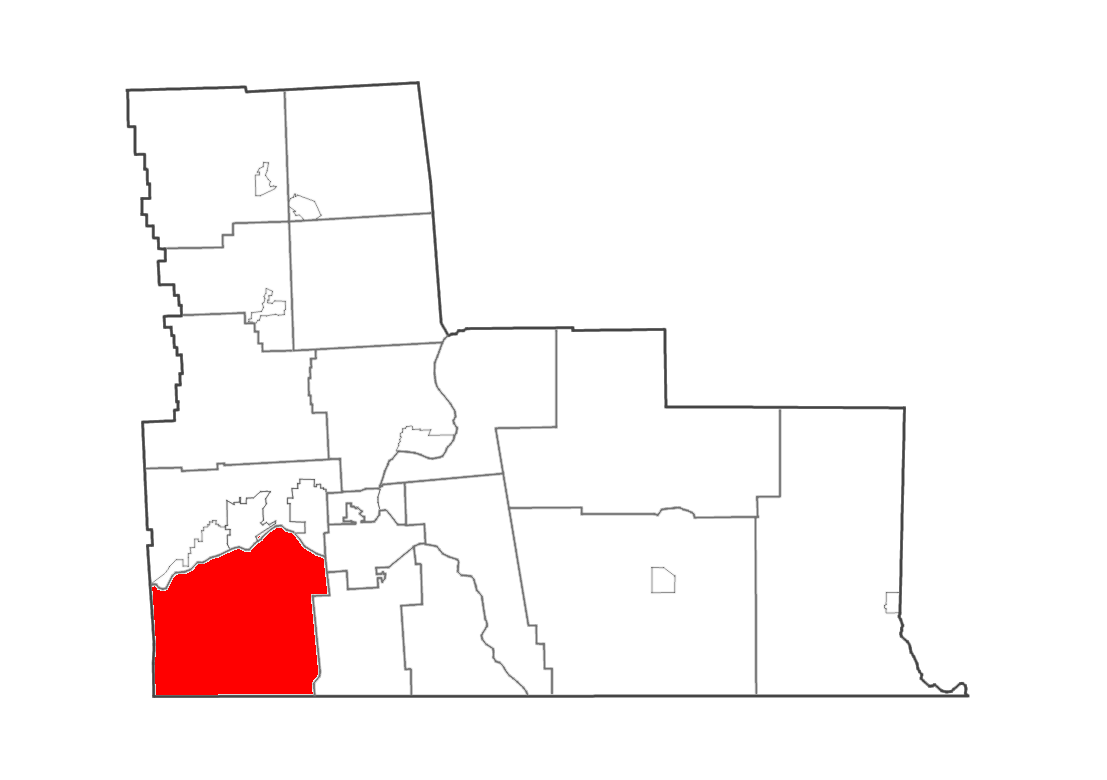
- Map highlighting Vestal's location within Broome County.

- Location within New York Location within the United States
- Coordinates: 42°05′04″N 76°03′12″W
- Country: United States
- State: New York
- County: Broome
- Established: 1823

Government
  - Type: Town Council
  - Town Supervisor: Maria Sexton
  - Town Council: Members' List: • Patty Fitzgerald; • Sue Messina; • Stephen Donnelly; • John Fletcher

Area
  - Total: 52.56 sq mi (136.13 km^{2})
  - Land: 51.73 sq mi (133.97 km^{2})
  - Water: 0.84 sq mi (2.17 km^{2}) 1.62%
- Elevation: 1,010 ft (308 m)

Population (2020)
  - Total: 29,110
  - Estimate (2023): 31,517
  - Density: 542.9/sq mi (209.62/km^{2})
- Time zone: UTC−5 (EST)
  - Summer (DST): UTC−4 (EDT)
- ZIP Codes: 13850–13851 (Vestal); 13902 (Binghamton)
- Area code: 607
- FIPS code: 36-77255
- GNIS feature ID: 979582
- Website: www.vestalny.gov

Vestal is a town within Broome County in the Southern Tier of New York, United States, and lies between the Susquehanna River and the Pennsylvania border. As of the 2020 census, the population was 29,110. Vestal is on the southern border of the county, and serves as a western suburb of the city of Binghamton. The town is home to the main campus of Binghamton University.

== History ==
The first European settlers arrived in Vestal around 1785.

The central area of Vestal, near Route 26 at Choconut Creek, was the site of an indigenous village of the Ochugnut tribe of the Tuscarora people. During the American Revolution, a squad of soldiers from the Sixth Massachusetts Regiment, under the command of Lt. William McKendry were sent to engage the tribes, when possible, and destroy their homes and crops. During the summer of 1779, the squad did burn at least two villages without encountering resistance, including one situated in what is now nearby downtown Binghamton (the Chenango, at the confluence of the Chenango and Susquehanna rivers), and the Ochugnut (Choconut) at the site of Choconut Creek near present-day Vestal High School.

This campaign during the American Revolution was initiated following Indigenous predations against settlers, presumed to have been carried out by tribes forming part of the Iroqouis alliance. This hostile activity against settlers was encouraged by the British. However, some evidence indicates that at least some of the indigenous people were actually Tuscarora— who fled from North Carolina after wars in 1711 and the War of 1763. This community was actually sympathetic to the American cause, siding against the rest of the Iroquois confederation. See Sullivan Expedition or external links for more information on the role of Upstate New York in this conflict.

Following the war, several European families settled in the area near the town of Union. The town of Vestal was formed from the southern half of Union in 1823.

On June 8, 1901, dynamite exploded aboard a train of the Delaware, Lackawanna and Western Railroad. While at a stop and taking on water, a second train crashed into it from behind. The trains were destroyed and twelve trainmen were killed or injured. So many curiosity seekers came to view the scene that extra trains were run to accommodate them.

The history of the town is closely related to its neighbors, Binghamton, Endicott, and Johnson City. During the 20th century, Vestal served as a residential suburb to emerging industries in its area, such as Endicott Johnson Corporation, IBM, and Lockheed Martin. In 1954, the state of New York broke ground on a new 387-acre (1.57 km^{2}) campus for Harpur College in Vestal. The college, part of the SUNY system, moved from Endicott to Vestal by 1961, and has since grown significantly and been renamed Binghamton University.

The Kopernik Observatory & Science Center is a public observatory in Vestal opened to the public on June 16, 1974, by the Kopernik Society of Broome County to commemorate the 500th anniversary of the birth of the astronomer Nicolaus Copernicus (Polish: Mikołaj Kopernik) in 1973. It is one of the best-sited and best equipped public observatories in the Northeast United States.

During the 1990s, Vestal became the major retail center of the Southern Tier region of New York, with many large shopping centers such as the Town Square Mall, Parkway Plaza, Shoppes at Vestal, and Campus Plaza being built along the Vestal Parkway (NY Route 434), which became one of the busiest roads in the area. Vestal's historic central business district is located along three blocks of Front Street, still lined with small shops.

The Drovers Inn and Round Family Residence and Vestal Central School were listed on the National Register of Historic Places in 2010.

== Geography ==
According to the United States Census Bureau, the town has a total area of 52.6 square miles (136.2 km^{2}), of which 51.7 square miles (134.0 km^{2}) is land, and 0.85 square miles (2.2 km^{2}) (1.62%) is water. The town of Vestal is on the south side of the Susquehanna River.

New York State Route 17 passes across the northern part of the town and intersects north–south highway New York State Route 26 by the Susquehanna River. New York State Route 434, Vestal Parkway, intersects NY-26 south of the NY-17 junction. New York State Route 201 also crosses to the north shore of the Susquehanna River, linking the eastern part of Vestal with the village of Johnson City.

=== Hamlets ===
The Town of Vestal recognizes five hamlets within its borders:

- Ross Corners is named for David Ross, a prominent lumberman who owned a store during much of the 19th century in the west of the town.
- Tracy Creek is named for Benjamin Tracy and is situated by a creek of the same name. It was originally a lumbering and farming community. It is also located in the western section of the town.
- Twin Orchards is a hamlet on the south bank of the Susquehanna River, named for the large orchards that used to border both sides of its main road.
- Vestal Center is located on NY-26 at the intersection of County Road 53, on the Big Choconut Creek about 4 miles (6 km) south of the main district, and approximately 3 miles (5 km) north of the Pennsylvania state line. It was originally spelled in English fashion ("Vestal Centre"), but this was changed in 1893. President Theodore Roosevelt once visited and gave a speech.
- Willow Point is located east of Twin Orchards, also on the south bank of the Susquehanna River.

== Demographics ==
Historical population
Census	Pop.	Note	%±
1830	948		—
1840	1,253		32.2%
1850	2,054		63.9%
1860	2,211		7.6%
1870	2,221		0.5%
1880	2,184		−1.7%
1890	2,076		−4.9%
1900	1,850		−10.9%
1910	1,618		−12.5%
1920	1,910		18.0%
1930	2,848		49.1%
1940	5,710		100.5%
1950	8,902		55.9%
1960	16,806		88.8%
1970	26,909		60.1%
1980	27,238		1.2%
1990	26,733		−1.9%
2000	26,567		−0.6%
2010	28,043		5.6%
2020	29,110		3.8%
2023 (est.)	31,517		8.3%
U.S. Decennial Census

As of the Census of 2000, there were 26,535 people, 8,525 households, and 5,924 families residing in the town. In the 2010 census, the number becomes 28,043. The population density was 508.5/sq mi (196.3/km^{2}). There were 8,898 housing units at an average density of 170.5/sq mi (65.8/km^{2}). The racial makeup of the town was 87.13% White, 2.19% African American, 0.15% Native American, 8.33% Asian, 0.99% from other races, and 1.20% from two or more races. Hispanic or Latino of any race were 2.40% of the population.

There were 8,525 households, out of which 29.6% had children under the age of 18 living with them, 59.9% were married couples living together, 7.0% had a female householder with no husband present, and 30.5% were non-families. Of all households 25.1% were made up of individuals, and 10.7% had someone living alone who was 65 years of age or older. The average household size was 2.45 and the average family size was 2.95.

In the town, the population was spread out, with 18.9% under the age of 18, 24.0% from 18 to 24, 20.6% from 25 to 44, 20.8% from 45 to 64, and 15.8% who were 65 years of age or older. The median age was 34 years. For every 100 females, there were 90.6 males. For every 100 females age 18 and over, there were 86.7 males.

The median income for a household in the town was $51,098, and the median income for a family was $60,676. Males had a median income of $48,731 versus $29,035 for females. The per capita income for the town was $22,363. About 4.3% of families and 7.1% of the population were below the poverty line, including 7.6% of those under age 18 and 5.1% of those age 65 or over.

== Parks and recreation ==
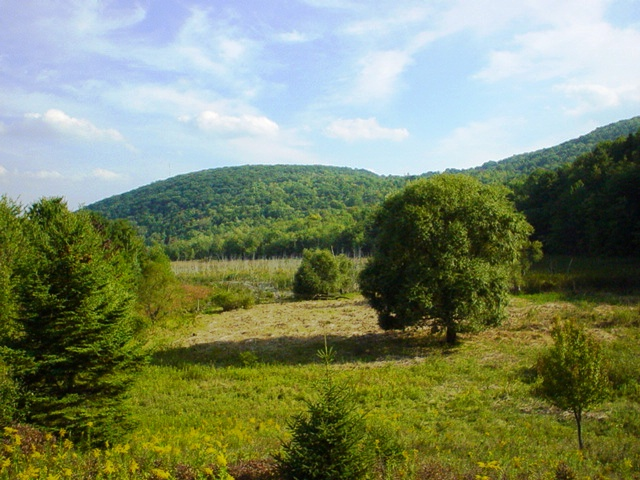
Nature preserve at Binghamton University

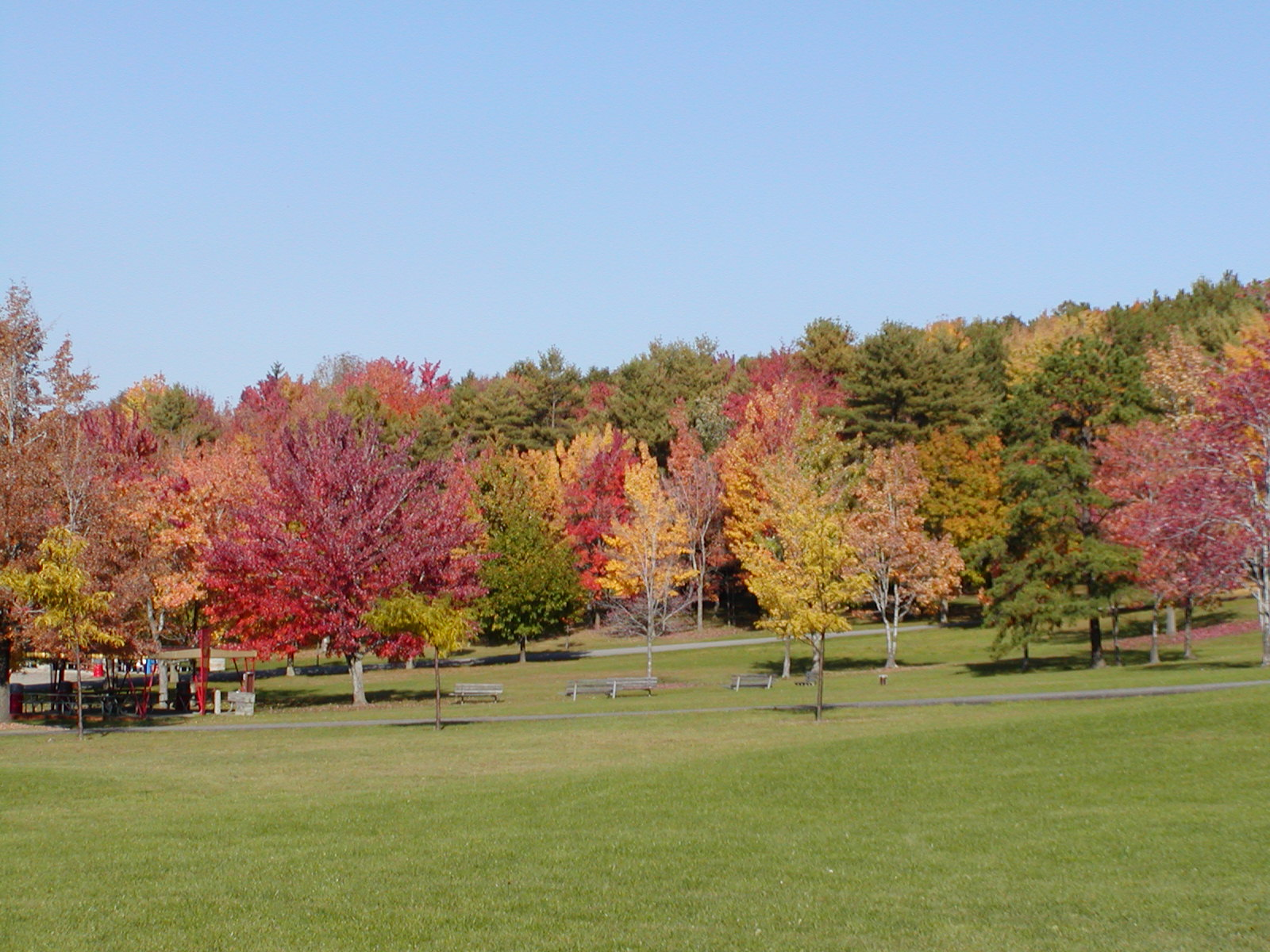
Arnold Park in the Fall

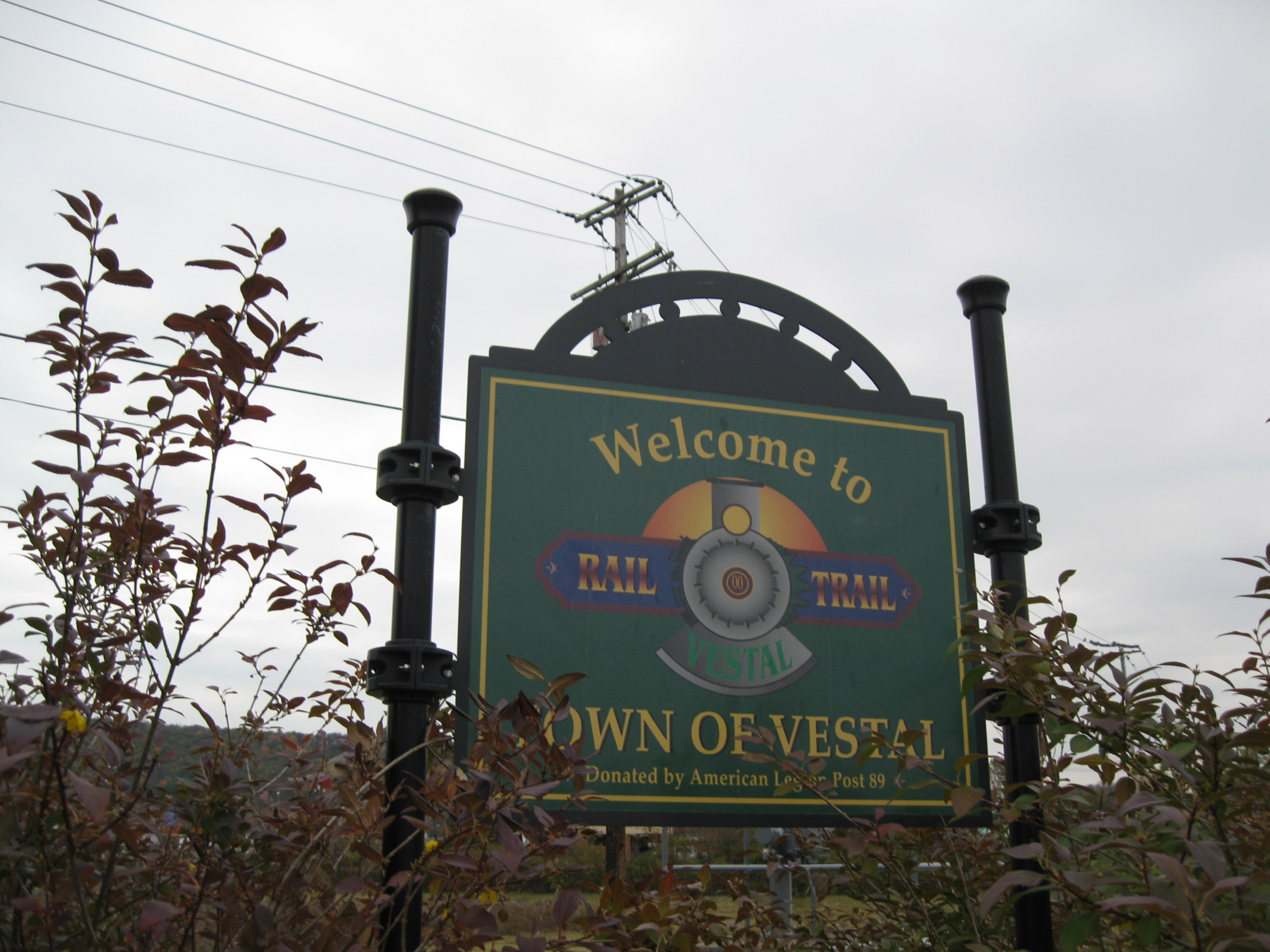
Welcome sign at the Town of Vestal Rail Trail

The town of Vestal has 21 town operated and maintained parks.

Vestal Rail Trail is 2.1 miles (3.4 km) long, and features a paved path.

== Government ==
Vestal is a "full service town", and has a police department, fire department, EMS, highway department, water department, library, museum, and school district.

== Education ==
- Binghamton University, a SUNY university center with over 17,000 students
- Vestal Central School District offers a K-12 education to over 4,000 students. The school district which includes Vestal High School.
- Ross Corners Christian Academy
- Hillel Academy

== Infrastructure ==
=== Transportation ===
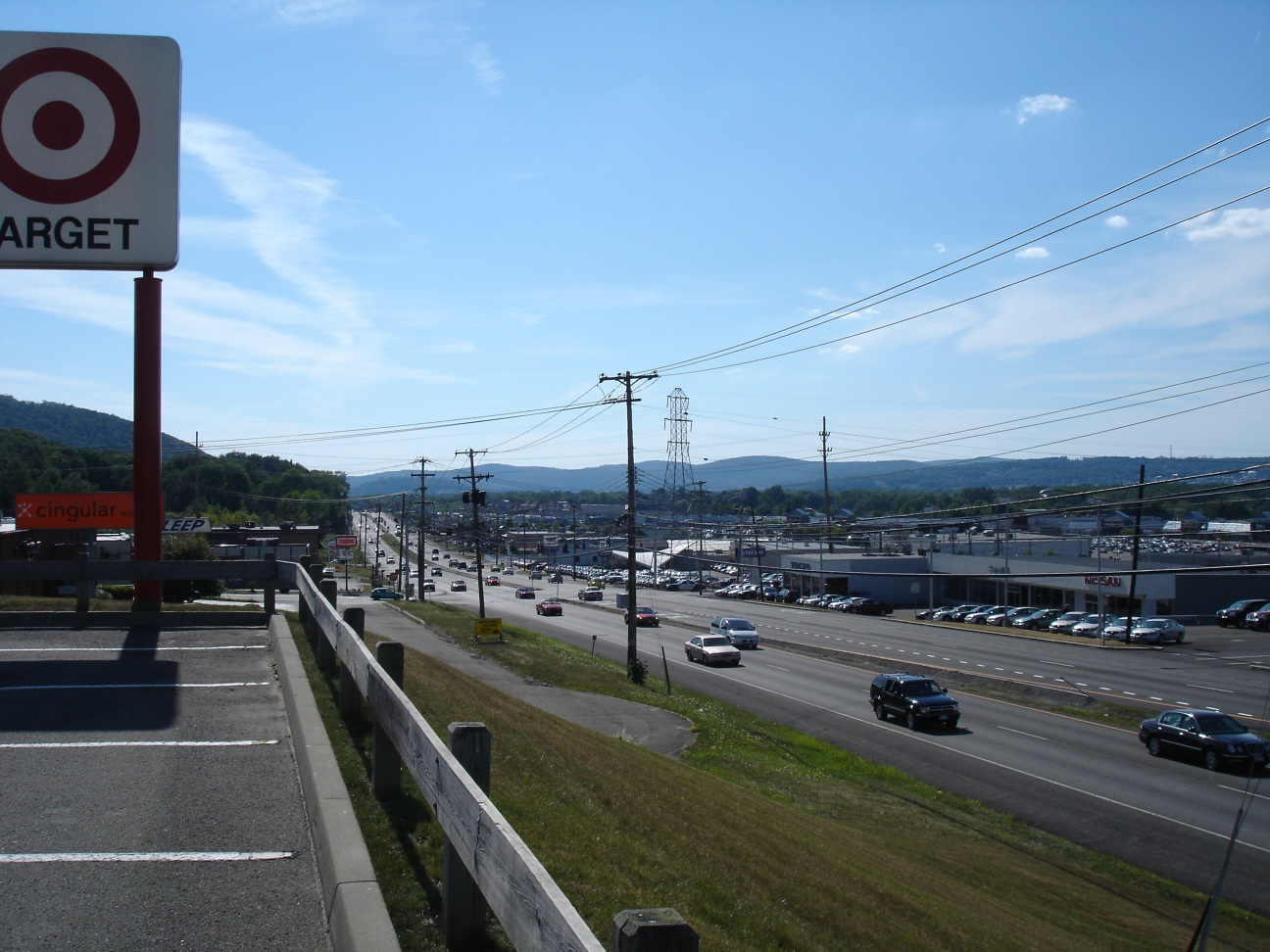
Retail along the Vestal Parkway

Interstate 86 / New York State Route 17 (Southern Tier Expressway) passes through Vestal.

Broome County Transit provides bus service.

Vestal had been a stop, midway between Binghamton and Owego, on the Delaware, Lackawanna and Western's mainline, serving passenger trains such as the Phoebe Snow.

=== Fire department ===
The Vestal Fire Department (VFD) is a volunteer fire department operating in Vestal, and neighboring communities when called to assist. It is taxpayer supported.

=== Volunteer Emergency Squad ===
The Vestal Volunteer Emergency Squad (VVES) provides emergency medical services. It receives no taxpayer support, and has one station, four nontransporting EMS vehicles, five ambulances, one gator, one trailer, six operational officers, 45 volunteer EMS personnel, 21 volunteer support members, eight full time paramedics, 12 part time paramedics, and receives over 38,000 calls per year.

=== Police ===
The Vestal Police Department (VPD) has 39 sworn police officers, three civilian staff, 10 civilian school crossing guards, and three school resource officers. The VPD shares a joint special response team with other Broome County agencies, a K-9 unit, detectives, and bicycle patrol.

== Notable people ==
- Howard G. Garrison, US Army major general, born and raised in Vestal
- Rocco Passionino, Film and Television Visual Effects Designer and Director
