= New York State Mathematics League =

Mathematics competition

The New York State Mathematics League (NYSML) competition was originally held in 1973 and has been held annually in a different location each year since. It was founded by Alfred Kalfus. The American Regions Math League competition is based on the format of the NYSML competition. The current iteration contains four sections: the team round, power question, individual round, and a relay. These are done in competition in that order. All of these rounds are done without a calculator. Each individual team can have up to fifteen students, which is the usual amount per team. Like ARML, it has banned the use of calculators beginning in the 2009 contest.

== Competition format ==
There are four sections in the current iteration, done so in a day:

- A team round where a team collaborates to solve ten questions in twenty minutes. There is a possible 50 points to earn here.
- A power question where a team has an hour to complete ten questions which requires proofs and explanations for a possible 50 points.
- An individual round, where each team member has five groups of two questions to answer, with each group of questions taking ten minutes, totaling fifty minutes for ten questions for a possible 150 points.
- A relay round, where teams are broken up into five groups of three if possible. There are three problems, with each member giving their answer back to the next member until it hits the third member, who can rise at 3 minutes for a correct answer to get 5 points, or rise at the time limit of 6 minutes for a correct answer to get 3 points. The maximum is fifty points.
- This brings the total maximum for points to 300.

== Past NYSML Competition Sites ==
Year	Location
2004	Westlake High School
2005	Fayetteville-Manlius High School
2006	Nyack High School
2007	Stuyvesant High School
2008	Victor Senior High School
2009	John Jay Senior High School
2010	SUNY Albany
2011	Suffolk County Community College
2012	Susquehanna Valley High School
2013	Byram Hills High School
2014	Fayetteville-Manlius High School
2015	Syosset High School
2016	Penfield High School
2017	Stuyvesant High School
2018	SUNY Geneseo
2019	Middletown High School
2020	N/A (Planned to be Ithaca High School)
2021	N/A (Online)
2022	N/A (Online)
2023	Ithaca High School
2024	Owego Free Academy
2025	Chaminade High School
2026	Webster Thomas High School

== Past NYSML Winners ==
Year	Division A Winners	Winning score	Division B Winners
2006	New York City A	N/A	Albany Area Math Circle
2007	New York City A	N/A	Monroe A
2008	New York City A	N/A	DUSO (Dutchess-Ulster-Sullivan-Orange) A
2011	New York City Manhattan	242	Ithaca High School
2012	New York City MBkSIBx	243	Onondaga A
2013	New York City A	237	Suffolk A
2014	New York City Seniors	223	Suffolk A
2020	N/A (Cancelled)		
2021	New York City Tin Man	274	N/A (One online division)
2022	New York City Tin Man	281	N/A (One online division)
2023	New York City Tin Man	242	Scarsdale High School
2024	New York City Tin Man	252	Scarsdale High School
2025	New York City Tin Man	264	Albany
2026	New York City Mad Hatter	247	Ithaca High School Math Team

== Past NYSML Individual Winners (a.k.a. the Curt Boddie Award) ==
Year	Individual Winner
2010	Allen Liu (Monroe County)
2011	Sam Duchovni (NYC)
2012	Allen Liu (Monroe County)
2013	Allen Liu (Monroe County)
2014	Max Fishelson (NYC)
2023	Andrew Li (NYC Tin Man)
2024	Emily Yu (Monroe County)
2025	Liran Zhou (Nassau County, New York)
