= List of state highways in Chautauqua County, New York =

- Map of New York with Chautauqua County highlighted in red

Highway names
- Interstates: Interstate X (I-X)
- US Highways: U.S. Route X (US X)
- State: New York State Route X (NY X)

System links
- New York Highways; Interstate; US; State; Reference; Parkways

There are 18 state-designated highways in Chautauqua County, New York, which comprise a combined 387.2 miles (623.1 km) of the touring route total mileage in New York. The 18 state highways include 11 state touring routes and seven reference routes. The nationally-assigned US 20 and US 62 also go through the county, as do I-86 and I-90.

== Touring routes ==
=== NY 5 ===
NY 5 is a major east–west highway in upstate New York that passes through fourteen counties before ending in the state capital of Albany. It extends for a total of 370.87 miles (596.86 km), 41.23 miles (66.35 km) of which is in Chautauqua County.

NY 5 begins in Chautauqua County at the Pennsylvania state line (into Pennsylvania, the road becomes Pennsylvania Route 5). NY 5 follows the shore of Lake Erie through the county, passing through Ripley, Westfield, Portland, Dunkirk, Sheridan, Silver Creek and Irving before crossing into Erie County.

Lake Erie State Park in Portland is accessible from NY 5.

=== NY 17 ===
NY 17 is concurrent with I-86 through Chautauqua County, as it is throughout most of the Southern Tier. It extends for a total of 396.84 miles (638.65 km) through twelve counties. 37.86 miles (60.93 km) of its path is within Chautauqua County. In Chautauqua County, NY 17 passes through Mina, Sherman, North Harmony, Bemus Point, Jamestown, Falconer and Kennedy.

=== NY 39 ===
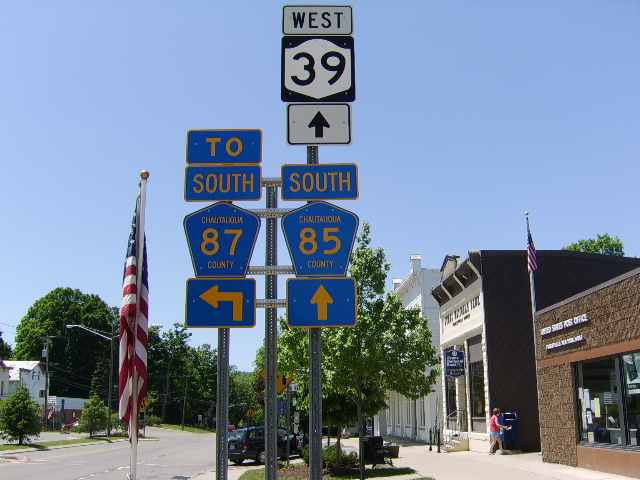
NY 39 in Forestville.

NY 39 begins at U.S. Route 20 in Sheridan. It is an east–west highway that extends for a total of 98.89 miles (159.15 km) through five Western New York counties. 11.13 miles (17.91 km) of its path goes through Chautauqua County. In Chautauqua County, NY 39 passes through Sheridan, Hanover and Forestville.

=== NY 60 ===
NY 60 begins at U.S. Route 62 in Kiantone. It is a north–south highway with a length of 33.16 miles (53.37 km), all of which is in Chautauqua County. NY 60 passes through Kiantone, Jamestown, Gerry, Charlotte, Cassadaga, Fredonia and Dunkirk.

=== NY 76 ===
NY 76 begins at an intersection with New York State Route 474 in Clymer. It is a north–south highway with a length of 19.35 miles (31.14 km), all of which is in Chautauqua County. NY 76 passes through Clymer, Sherman and Ripley.

=== NY 83 ===
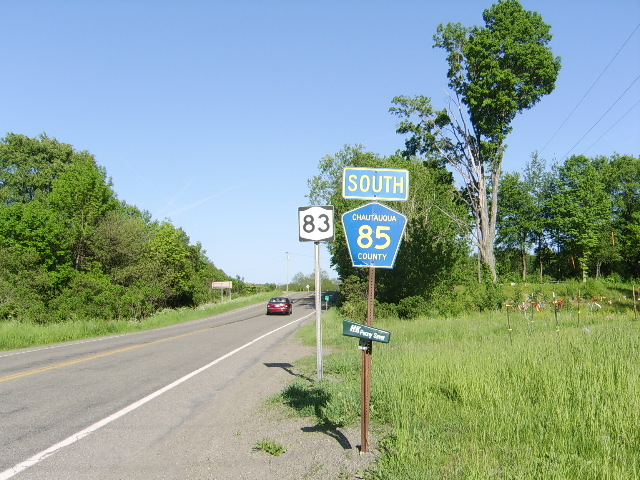
NY 83 running concurrent with County Route 85 in Arkwright.

NY 83 begins at U.S. Route 62 at the Cattaraugus County line. It is a north–south highway with a length of 21.82 miles (35.12 km), all of which is in Chautauqua County. NY 83 passes through Cherry Creek, Villenova and Arkwright.

=== NY 322 ===
NY 322 begins at New York State Route 83 in Villenova. It is an east–west highway with a total length of 4.70 miles (7.56 km), 1.55 miles (2.49 km) of which is in Chautauqua County before it crosses into Cattaraugus County.

=== NY 394 ===
NY 394 begins at New York State Route 5 in Westfield. It is an east–west highway with a total length of 52.32 miles (84.20 km), 40.13 miles (64.58 km) of which is in Chautauqua County before it crosses into Cattaraugus County. In Chautauqua County, NY 394 passes through Westfield, Mayville, Chautauqua, Lakewood, Jamestown, Falconer and Kennedy.

=== NY 426 ===
NY 426 begins at the Pennsylvania state line near Clymer, looping through the southwestern corner of the county and re-entering Pennsylvania near Findley Lake, becoming Pennsylvania Route 426 at both ends. It is a north–south highway with a length of 13.32 miles (21.44 km), all of which is in Chautauqua County. NY 426 passes through French Creek and Findley Lake.

=== NY 430 ===
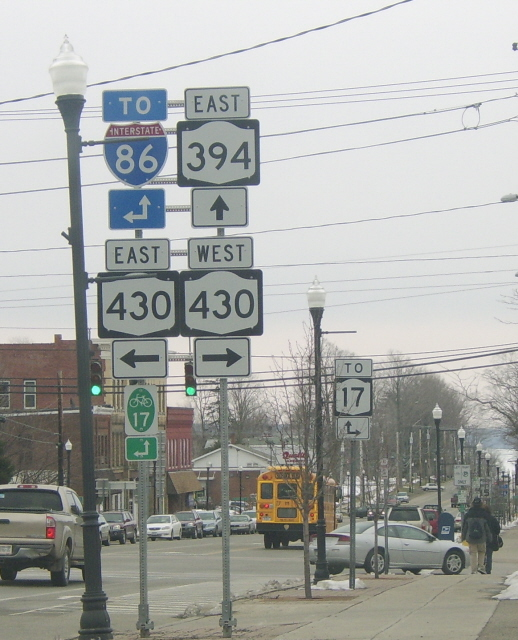
NY 430 intersects with NY 394 in Mayville.

NY 430 begins at the Pennsylvania state line near Findley Lake. It is an east–west highway with a length of 38.49 miles (61.94 km), all of which is in Chautauqua County. NY 430, also known as the Sen. Jess J. Present Memorial Highway, passes through Findley Lake, Sherman, Mayville, Bemus Point and Jamestown.

=== NY 474 ===
NY 474 begins at the Pennsylvania state line in French Creek. It is a north–south highway with a length of 24.58 miles (39.56 km), all of which is in Chautauqua County. NY 474 passes through French Creek, Clymer, Panama, Ashville and Lakewood.

== Reference routes ==
=== NY 950D ===
New York State Route 950D, also known as Shortman Road, is a reference route in Ripley. It is 1.22 miles (1.96 km) in length, running between New York State Route 5 and U.S. Route 20 and providing access from those routes to Interstate 90.

=== NY 951C ===
New York State Route 951C was the former designation of Washington Street in Jamestown. The 1.08-mile (1.74 km) north-to-south stretch connected Fluvanna Avenue (New York State Route 430) to New York State Route 394, parallel to Route 60. Some time in the early 21st century, the east end of Route 430 was rerouted onto Washington Street, eliminating the 951C designation.

=== NY 952H ===
New York State Route 952H, also known as Center Street, is a reference route in Silver Creek. It is just 0.04 miles (0.06 km) in length, providing a connection between New York State Route 5 and U.S. Route 20.

=== NY 952P ===
New York State Route 952P, also known as Forest Avenue Extension, is a reference route in Busti. It is 7.61 miles (12.25 km) in length, connecting Jamestown with the Pennsylvania state line.

=== NY 953B ===
New York State Route 953B, also known as Strunk Road, is a reference route in Ellicott. It is 0.44 miles (0.71 km) in length, providing access to I-86 from New York State Route 430.

=== NY 954J ===
New York State Route 954J is a reference route that serves as an I-86 access road near Bemus Point. It is 1.62 miles (2.61 km) in length and provides a connection between New York State Route 430 and the interstate.

=== NY 954K ===
New York State Route 954K is a reference route in Jamestown. It is 1.09 miles (1.75 km) in length, running along Third Street and McDaniel Avenue parallel to and south of New York State Route 394 and connecting to Route 394 at both ends of the route.
