= New York State Route 394 =

Highway in New York

New York State Route 394
- Map of southwestern New York with NY 394 highlighted in red, and extension south as NY 950A in blue

Route information
- Maintained by NYSDOT and the city of Jamestown
- Length: 52.32 mi (84.20 km)
- Existed: November 1973–present

Major junctions
- West end: NY 5 in Westfield town
- I-90 near Westfield village; NY 430 in Mayville; I-86 / NY 17 near Bemus Point; NY 60 in Jamestown; US 62 in Poland
- East end: I-86 / NY 17 / NY 950A in Coldspring

Location
- Country: United States
- State: New York
- Counties: Chautauqua, Cattaraugus

Highway system
- New York Highways; Interstate; US; State; Reference; Parkways
← NY 393	→ NY 395
← NY 17G	NY 17J	→ NY 17K

New York State Route 394 (NY 394) is a state highway located within Cattaraugus and Chautauqua counties in southwestern New York in the United States. Its western terminus is located on the shore of Lake Erie at an intersection with NY 5 in the Westfield hamlet of Barcelona. The eastern terminus is located at an interchange with the Southern Tier Expressway (I-86/NY 17) at the Coldspring hamlet of Steamburg. From Mayville to Jamestown, NY 394 follows the western edge of Chautauqua Lake. East of Jamestown, the route straddles the Southern Tier Expressway and connects to the highway in four different locations, including at its eastern terminus.

The segments of NY 394 between Westfield and Mayville, as well as east of Jamestown were originally designated as NY 17 in 1924. Six years later, the remainder of current NY 394 gained a pair of designations as part of the 1930 renumbering of state highways in New York; however, by the mid-1940s, the Mayville–Jamestown stretch was solely designated as New York State Route 17J. In November 1973, NY 17 was realigned onto the new Southern Tier Expressway east of Jamestown. The former alignment of NY 17 between Jamestown and Steamburg and all of NY 17J were redesignated as NY 394. NY 394 was extended westward to Barcelona shortly afterward. Today the route is also concurrent with part of New York State Bicycle Route 17.

== Route description ==
=== Lake Erie to Mayville ===
NY 394 begins at an intersection with NY 5 (here part of the Seaway Trail) in Barcelona, on the shore of Lake Erie. The route heads to the southeast, paralleling Chautauqua Creek and meeting the New York State Thruway (I-90) at exit 60 a quarter-mile (0.4 km) from NY 5. NY 394 crosses over the Thruway and enters the village of Westfield, passing baseball fields and local businesses ahead of an intersection with U.S. Route 20 (US 20). The road continues through the outskirts of Westfield, passing more local businesses and parks. After the intersection with East Campbell Avenue, NY 394 leaves Westfield and heads into rural regions of Chautauqua County.

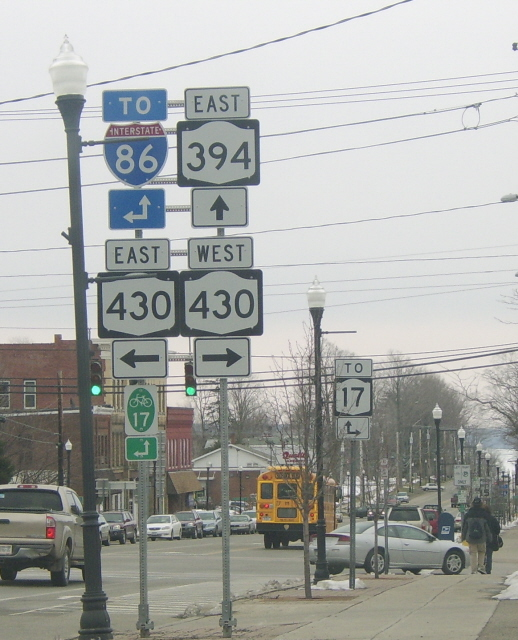
The intersection of NY 394 and NY 430 comprises the main intersection of the village of Mayville. Chautauqua Lake is visible in the background.

After leaving Westfield, NY 394 heads to the southeast towards Mayville through predominantly farmland and open fields. Here, NY 394 is known as South Portage Road as it winds its way southeast through the town of Chautauqua. The highway leaves the vicinity of Chautauqua Creek shortly after entering the town. Roughly 2 miles (3.2 km) from the creek, NY 394 enters the Mayville village limits upon intersecting Beaujean Road. Within the village, NY 394 passes by Chautauqua Lake Central School ahead of a junction with NY 430, a road ultimately leading westward to Erie, Pennsylvania. Past the intersection, both NY 394 and NY 430 begin to parallel Chautauqua Lake as they head southeastward, with NY 394 following the western edge of the water body.

=== Chautauqua Lake ===
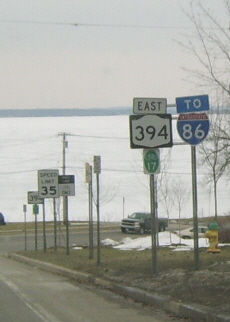
NY 394 encounters the northern end of Chautauqua Lake in Mayville.

Outside of Mayville, the highway reenters the town of Chautauqua and goes along the shore of the lake. NY 394 intersects with some local roads as it approaches the Chautauqua Institution, where it passes the Chautauqua Golf Club just west of the grounds. Just south of the golf club is an access road to a fish hatchery maintained by the state. NY 394 leaves Chautauqua quickly and passes to the east of Willow Run Golf Course. After intersections with County Route 18 (CR 18, named Magnolia–Stedman Road) and CR 16 (Stow Road), NY 394 turns southward and meets the Southern Tier Expressway (I-86 and NY 17) at exit 8 less than 1 mile (1.6 km) from Bemus Point.

South of the expressway, NY 394 remains the primary lakeside roadway as it passes through the communities of Quigley Park and Cheney's Point. NY 394 turns back to the southeast at an intersection with CR 43, passing Edward F. Loomis Park and remaining on the now-southern edge of Chautauqua Lake. As the route approaches Lakewood, traffic generally becomes more dense and it intersects NY 474, a largely rural roadway linking the Jamestown area to Wattsburg, Pennsylvania. NY 394 continues onward through Lakewood and into Jamestown, where the lake comes to an end near an intersection with Jackson Avenue.

=== Jamestown area ===
NY 394, initially known as Sixth Street within the city limits, splits into a one-way pair after crossing the Chadakoin River. At this point, eastbound NY 394 shifts one block south to follow Fifth Street while westbound NY 394 remains on Sixth. Between Washington Street and North Main Street, NY 394 is concurrent with NY 60, with NY 60 south overlapping NY 394 west on Sixth Street and NY 60 north overlapping NY 394 east on Fifth. The one-way pair remains intact through downtown to Prendergast Avenue, where NY 394 comes back together and shifts south onto Fourth Street. Two blocks later, NY 394 veers onto Second Street and passes south of Jamestown Community College before exiting the city. The portion of NY 394 within Jamestown from the western city line to Prendergast Avenue is maintained by the city and is the only section of the route not maintained by the New York State Department of Transportation.

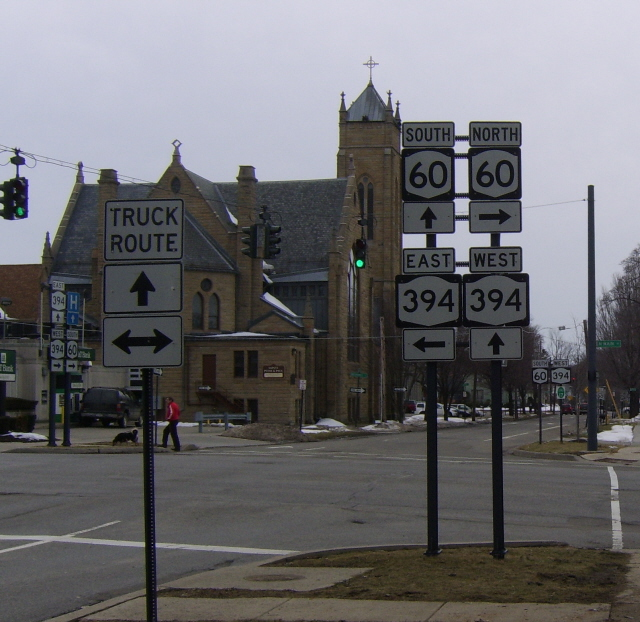
Eastern terminus of NY 60 south/NY 394 west overlap along Sixth Street in Jamestown

In nearby Falconer, the route becomes Main Street and intersects with CR 380, an extension of former NY 380. The highway heads to the northeast through the village, intersecting with local roads before connecting to the Southern Tier Expressway again at exit 13. The road parallels the expressway as both head northeast out of Falconer.

=== Poland and Cattaraugus County ===
Outside of Falconer, NY 394 enters the town of Poland and heads northeast to the hamlet of Kennedy, home to a junction with US 62. US 62 and NY 394 become concurrent and head through Kennedy to Schermerhorn Corners, where US 62 leaves to the north. NY 394 continues eastward, passing into Cattaraugus County and meeting the Southern Tier Expressway at exit 15 by way of Schoolhouse Road. The segment of Schoolhouse Road between NY 394 and the freeway is designated as NY 953A, an unsigned reference route. NY 394 enters the hamlet of Randolph roughly 3 miles (5 km) later and intersects with both the Southern Tier Expressway at exit 16 via Main Street (unsigned NY 952M) and NY 241. Outside of Randolph, NY 394 separates from the expressway and follows a northeasterly routing to the neighboring hamlet of East Randolph. Here, the route meets NY 242 as it turns southward toward the Southern Tier Expressway once again.

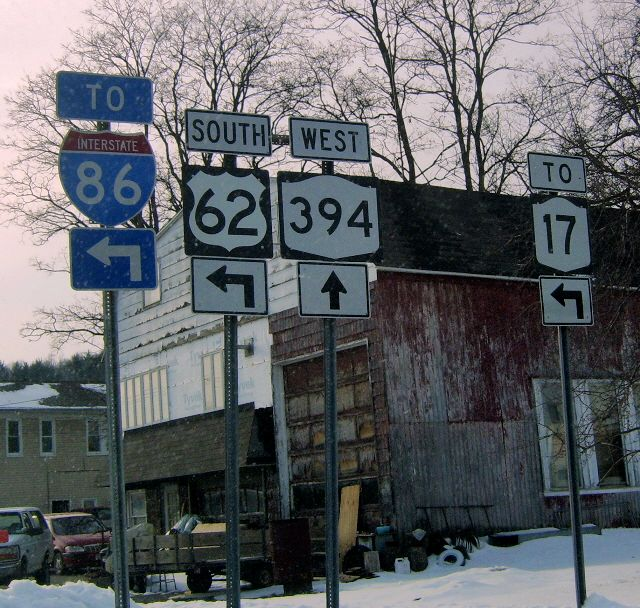
Western terminus of the overlap between NY 394 and US 62 in Kennedy. Exit 14 of the Southern Tier Expressway is accessible by following US 62 south.

NY 394 leaves East Randolph and heads southward through the town of Coldspring, where it rejoins the corridor of the Southern Tier Expressway about 3.5 miles (5.6 km) from East Randolph. The two highways follow parallel routings for an additional 1.5 miles (2.4 km) to exit 17 on the expressway (at the hamlet of Steamburg), where NY 394 terminates. Past the interchange, the right-of-way of NY 394 continues southward along the Allegheny Reservoir past the Onoville Marina to the Pennsylvania state line (a distance of 12.76 miles or 20.54 kilometres) as West Perimeter Road, designated with the reference number NY 950A. Past the Pennsylvania border, the right-of-way continues via Commonwealth-maintained quadrant routes into Warren, where it meets U.S. Route 6 Business.

== History ==
=== Westfield–Mayville corridor ===
The Westfield–Mayville corridor was originally connected by way of a 9-mile (14 km) long Native American trail. French explorers, led by Étienne Brûlé, apparently discovered the trail in 1615 and used it periodically thereafter; since Brûlé did not write about his journeys and the only evidence of them comes from secondhand sources, the tribes who originally occupied the territory at the time of Brûlé's pass-through remain unknown (in contrast, Joseph de La Roche Daillon, who conducted a missionary journey further east in 1626, kept meticulous notes that to this day are the only surviving accounts of pre-Beaver Wars native activity in Western New York). In 1749, an expedition under the command of Pierre Joseph Céloron de Blainville landed at the mouth of Chautauqua Creek on Lake Erie with the intent of claiming the Ohio Valley for the French. They hacked out a road to Chautauqua Lake through the forests that lined the trail on their way to the Allegheny River and thus to the Ohio River.

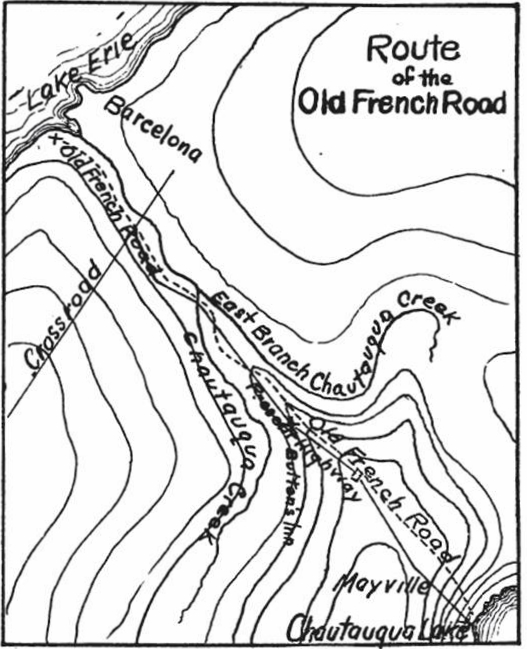
Hand Drawn Illustration of the French Portage Road c. 1912.

Another French expedition in 1753 converted the portage road into a military road. The road was still in evidence in 1802 when settlers first moved into the area. They called it the "Old French Road" and the Holland Land Company used it as the western end of Chautauqua Road, the first road cut through the Southern Tier of Western New York. Remnants of the portage road remain to this day: most of NY 394 between the two waterbodies is named Portage Street, and a loop road off NY 394 south of the village of Westfield is called Old Portage Road.

The portion of NY 394 between East Randolph and Jamestown was originally the Jamestown Road, established by the Holland Land Company in the 1810s and 1820s. In East Randolph, the Jamestown Road (still in existence under that name) continued northeast through Napoli to rejoin the Chautauqua Road near Little Valley.

=== Designations ===
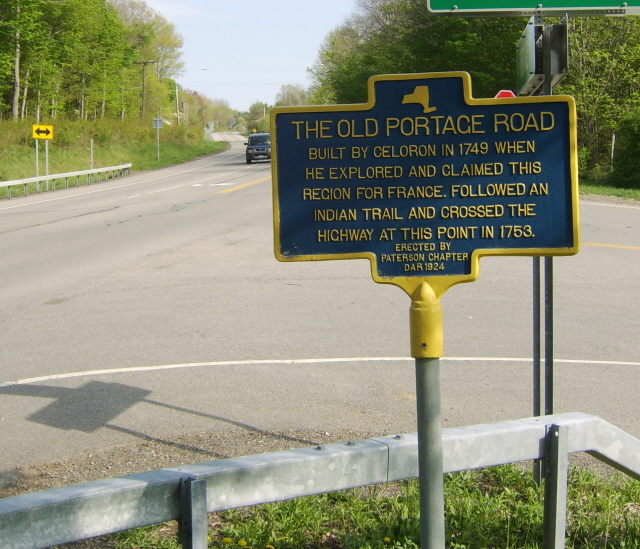
A historical marker on NY 394 east of Westfield commemorating the Old Portage Road.

When the first set of posted routes in New York were assigned in 1924, what is now NY 394 from Westfield to Mayville, as well as from Jamestown to Steamburg, was designated as part of NY 17, a cross-state highway extending across the Southern Tier from Westfield to New Jersey. In the 1930 renumbering of state highways in New York, an alternate route of NY 17 from Mayville to Jamestown was designated as NY 17J from Mayville to Ashville and part of NY 74 from Ashville to Jamestown. In the mid-1930s, NY 17J was extended eastward to rejoin NY 17 at Washington Street in Jamestown, creating an overlap with NY 74. This overlap was eliminated in the mid-1940s when NY 74 was truncated to Ashville. NY 17, meanwhile, was extended to Barcelona to meet NY 5 by 1946.

Construction began on a new limited-access highway through Cattaraugus and Chautauqua counties (part of the modern Southern Tier Expressway) in the mid-1960s. The initial section of the highway, extending from Kennedy (exit 14) to Randolph (exit 16), opened to traffic by 1967 and became part of a rerouted NY 17 in the late 1960s. By November 1973, the expressway had been extended west to Fluvanna (exit 11) and east to Steamburg (exit 17). NY 17 was then realigned to follow the expressway while its former routing from Jamestown to Steamburg, as well as all of NY 17J, was redesignated as NY 394. By 1977, the Southern Tier Expressway was completed up to exit 10 in Bemus Point.

In the late 1970s, NY 394 was extended northwestward to Barcelona, overlapping NY 17. The concurrency was only temporary as NY 17 was realigned to follow the Southern Tier Expressway from Bemus Point to Mina once that segment was completed in the early 1980s. On April 1, 1980, ownership and maintenance of NY 394 from Westfield to Barcelona was transferred from Chautauqua County to New York State as part of a highway maintenance swap between the two levels of government.

== Major intersections ==
County	Location	mi	km	Destinations	Notes
Chautauqua	Town of Westfield	0.00	0.00	NY 5 – Erie, PA, Buffalo	Western terminus; hamlet of Barcelona
Chautauqua	Town of Westfield	0.26	0.42	I-90 – Cleveland, Buffalo	Exit 60 on I-90 / Thruway
Chautauqua	Village of Westfield	1.56	2.51	US 20 – Brocton, Ripley	
Chautauqua	Mayville	7.83	12.60	NY 430	
Chautauqua	North Harmony	17.24	27.75	I-86 / NY 17 – Erie, PA, Olean	Exit 8 on I-86; hamlet of Stow
Chautauqua	Busti	22.08	35.53	NY 474 west – Ashville, Panama	Eastern terminus of NY 474; hamlet of Cottage Park
Chautauqua	Jamestown	27.45	44.18	McDaniel Avenue (NY 954K east)	
Chautauqua	Jamestown	27.83	44.79	NY 60 south	Western end of NY 60 concurrency
Chautauqua	Jamestown	27.95	44.98	NY 60 north	Eastern end of NY 60 concurrency
Chautauqua	Falconer	30.86	49.66	CR 380	
Chautauqua	Ellicott	31.62	50.89	I-86 / NY 17 – Erie, PA, Olean	Exit 13 on I-86
Chautauqua	Poland	37.31	60.04	US 62 south to I-86 / NY 17 – Warren, PA	Hamlet of Kennedy; western end of US 62 concurrency
Chautauqua	Poland	38.41	61.81	US 62 north – Buffalo	Hamlet of Schermerhorn Corners; eastern end of US 62 concurrency
Cattaraugus	Randolph	41.52	66.82	To I-86 / NY 17	Access via NY 953A
Cattaraugus	Randolph	44.63	71.83	To I-86 / NY 17	Access via NY 952M; hamlet of Randolph
Cattaraugus	Randolph	44.95	72.34	NY 241 north	Southern terminus of NY 241
Cattaraugus	Coldspring	46.82	75.35	NY 242 east – Little Valley	Western terminus of NY 242
Cattaraugus	Coldspring	51.95	83.61	Old Route 17 (NY 951T east)	Hamlet of Steamburg
Cattaraugus	Coldspring	52.32	84.20	I-86 / NY 17 – Erie, PA, Olean	Exit 17 on I-86
Cattaraugus	Coldspring	52.32	84.20	West Bank Perimeter Road (NY 950A south) – Onoville	Continuation south
1.000 mi = 1.609 km; 1.000 km = 0.621 mi: Concurrency terminus; Electronic toll collection
