= New York State Route 430 =

State highway in Chautauqua County, New York, US

New York State Route 430
- Senator Jess J. Present Memorial Highway
- Map of Chautauqua County with NY 430 highlighted in red, and NY 954J in blue

Route information
- Maintained by NYSDOT, Chautauqua County, and the city of Jamestown
- Length: 39.24 mi (63.15 km)
- History: Designated NY 75 in 1930; renumbered to NY 430 c. 1932

Major junctions
- West end: PA 430 at the Pennsylvania state line in Findley Lake
- NY 76 in Sherman; NY 394 in Mayville; I-86 / NY 17 / Southern Tier Expressway in Bemus Point
- East end: NY 60 / NY 394 in Jamestown

Location
- Country: United States
- State: New York
- Counties: Chautauqua

Highway system
- New York Highways; Interstate; US; State; Reference; Parkways
← NY 429	→ NY 431

New York State Route 430 (NY 430) is a state highway located entirely within Chautauqua County, New York, in the United States. Its western terminus is located at the Pennsylvania state line near the hamlet of Findley Lake in the town of Mina. The eastern terminus is located in the city of Jamestown at a junction with NY 60 and NY 394. NY 430 is ceremoniously designated as the Senator Jess J. Present Memorial Highway in honor of Jess Present, a New York State Senator from Jamestown.

Municipalities NY 430 runs through include (from west to east) the villages of Sherman and Mayville, the hamlet of Maple Springs, the village of Bemus Point and the city of Jamestown. Besides NY 60, NY 430 intersects with NY 76 in Sherman and NY 394 in Mayville. It meets the Southern Tier Expressway (Interstate 86 or I-86 and NY 17) multiple times: in Sherman via NY 76, twice in Bemus Point (once by way of a short expressway designated as the unsigned NY 954J and also via an interchange located southwest of NY 954J), and in Jamestown via Strunk Road. NY 430 also runs along the east side of Chautauqua Lake, and services both Long Point State Park and Midway Park.

The portion of NY430 east of Mayville was originally designated as part of NY 17 in 1924; the remainder was originally designated as New York State Route 75 as part of the 1930 renumbering of state highways in New York. NY 75 was renumbered to NY 430 c. 1932. NY 430 was extended eastward to its current terminus in Jamestown in the late 1970s after NY 17 was realigned onto a newly completed section of the Southern Tier Expressway between Bemus Point and Jamestown.

== Route description ==
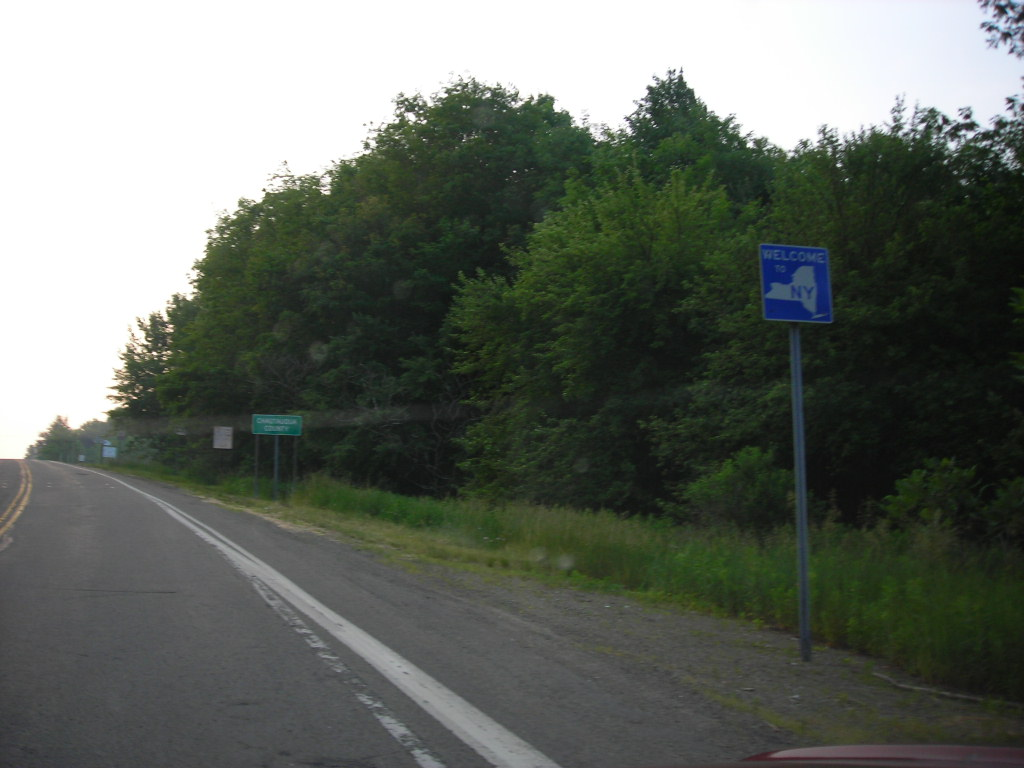
NY 430 at its beginning near Findley Lake

West of Mayville, NY 430 is a largely rural route connecting Erie, Pennsylvania, (via Pennsylvania Route 430 or PA 430) to Mayville via Sherman; however, east of Mayville, the route is a primary arterial serving the northern and eastern shores of Chautauqua Lake.

=== Western Chautauqua County ===
NY 430 begins at the Pennsylvania state line in rural western Chautauqua County as a continuation of PA 430, which begins roughly 13 miles (21 km) to the west in Erie. The route proceeds eastward as a county-maintained, state-numbered highway through the westernmost portion of the town of Mina to the hamlet of Findley Lake, a small community located at the northern tip of the lake of the same name. Here, the New York State Department of Transportation assumes maintenance of the route at a junction with NY 426. NY 430 briefly overlaps with NY 426 through the community and past the northern tip of the waterbody that gives the hamlet its name. The two routes split at the eastern edge of the community.

While NY 426 leaves NY 430 to follow the eastern edge of the lake southward toward French Creek, NY 430 continues to the northeast, passing through the hamlet of Mina and over the Southern Tier Expressway (I-86 and NY 17) on its way to the town of Sherman and the village of the same name. Within the village of Sherman, NY 430 becomes Main Street and intersects NY 76 west of the village center. The two routes overlap for a single block before separating at the heart of the village, with NY 76 continuing southward to an interchange with the Southern Tier Expressway just outside the village and, farther south, to its southern terminus at NY 474 in Clymer. NY 430, however, exits Sherman to the east before turning northward to parallel an old railroad bed northward into the town of Chautauqua.

At the hamlet of Summerdale, NY 430 curves to the northeast, generally following the former rail line into Mayville, a village situated at the northwestern tip of Chautauqua Lake. In the center of the village, NY 430 intersects NY 394 at an intersection that once was the eastern terminus of NY 430. Now, however, NY 430 continues northeast past NY 394 and out of Mayville.

=== Chautauqua Lake ===
East of Mayville, NY 430 parallels the northern and eastern shoreline of Chautauqua Lake, providing access to several lakeside residences and communities along the route. Roughly halfway down the length of the lake in Ellery, NY 430 passes both Midway State Park, a local amusement park, and Long Point State Park. South of Long Point, NY 430, a two-lane undivided roadway up to this point, becomes a limited-access highway as it approaches Bemus Point. NY 430 exits from the road soon after while the expressway heads south as NY 954J for another 1.62 miles (2.61 km) to exit 10 on the Southern Tier Expressway.

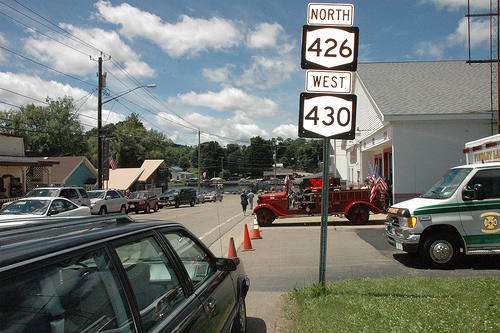
NY 430 runs concurrently with NY 426 in the hamlet of Findley Lake in the town of Mina.

NY 430, once more a surface road, becomes county-maintained again as it heads southwest on Lakeside Drive to Bemus Point, a village located at the narrowest point of Chautauqua Lake between Mayville and Jamestown. Due to the narrow width of the lake at Bemus Point, a ferry once ran from the end of Lakeside Drive to the North Harmony hamlet of Stow; however, it has since been replaced with the Chautauqua Lake Bridge on the Southern Tier Expressway farther south. NY 430, however, turns southeast at Main Street and connects to the aforementioned expressway at the eastern end of the Chautauqua Lake Bridge by way of an interchange near the southern edge of Bemus Point.

Past the exit, NY 430 becomes state-maintained again as it parallels both the Southern Tier Expressway and Chautauqua Lake into the town of Ellicott, where NY 430 meets I-86 and NY 17 one final time at exit 11 (via Strunk Road). NY 430 continues eastward into the city of Jamestown, where it becomes Fluvanna Avenue. Within the city, NY 430 turns southward from Fluvanna Avenue onto Washington Street and heads toward downtown. The eastern terminus of NY 430 comes at an intersection with NY 394 westbound (West 5th Street). The state highway is signed to the next block with West 4th Street where NY 394 heads east and NY 60 turns from Washington Street onto West 4th Street.

== History ==
When the first set of posted routes in New York were assigned in 1924, what is now NY 430 between Mayville and Jamestown was designated as part of NY 17. In the 1930 renumbering of state highways in New York, this section of NY 17 was left unchanged while a previously unnumbered roadway leading from NY 17 in Mayville to Findley Lake via Sherman was designated as NY 75. When U.S. Route 62 (US 62) was extended into New York c. 1932, NY 75 was reassigned to what had been designated as NY 62 as part of the 1930 renumbering. The original NY 75 was renumbered to NY 430.

NY 430 remained unchanged until the late 1950s when the route was extended westward to the Pennsylvania state line to connect to the new PA 430, an east–west highway leading to Erie. In the late 1970s, NY 17 was rerouted onto the new Southern Tier Expressway (STE) from Bemus Point to Jamestown. Its former at-grade alignment between the two locations became an eastward extension of NY 430. At the time, the portion of the STE between Sherman and Bemus Point was under construction, resulting in a temporary overlap between NY 17 and NY 430 from Mayville to modern NY 954J. Work began c. 1981 on the segment of the STE between Findley Lake and Sherman. The entirety of the Findley Lake–Bemus Point section of the expressway was completed by 1985 as a realignment of NY 17; the former section of NY 17 connecting the STE to NY 430 became NY 954J. In Jamestown, NY 430 formerly continued east on Fluvanna Avenue to end at NY 60; it was changed to its current routing in the 2010s. In 2005, the entirety of NY 430 was ceremoniously designated as the "Senator Jess J. Present Memorial Highway" in honor of Jess Present, a New York State Senator from Jamestown.

== Major intersections ==
The entire route is in Chautauqua County.

Location	mi	km	Destinations	Notes
Mina	0.00	0.00	PA 430 west – North East, Erie	Continuation into Pennsylvania
Mina	1.27– 1.30	2.04– 2.09	NY 426 north to I-86 / NY 17 / Southern Tier Expressway / I-90 CR 1 (Mann Road)	Hamlet of Findley Lake; western terminus of NY 426 / NY 430 overlap
Mina	1.53	2.46	NY 426 south (Sunnyside Road) CR 3 (North Road)	Hamlet of Findley Lake; eastern terminus of NY 426 / NY 430 overlap
Village of Sherman	9.47	15.24	NY 76 north (Kipp Street) / CR 15 (Hart Street)	Western terminus of NY 76 / NY 430 overlap
Village of Sherman	9.57	15.40	NY 76 south (Franklin Street) to I-86 / NY 17 / Southern Tier Expressway	Eastern terminus of NY 76 / NY 430 overlap
Mayville	18.52	29.81	NY 394 (Erie Street) to I-86 / NY 17 / Southern Tier Expressway / I-90 – Chautauqua, Westfield	
Bemus Point	28.54– 28.84	45.93– 46.41	NY 954J to I-86 / NY 17 / Southern Tier Expressway – Jamestown, Erie, PA CR 44 east (Bemus Point–Ellery Road) – Ellery Center	Interchange; to exit 10 on I-86; western terminus of CR 44
Town of Ellery	30.20– 30.34	48.60– 48.83	I-86 west / NY 17 west / Southern Tier Expressway west – Erie, PA	Eastbound exit and westbound entrance; exit 9 on I-86; hamlet of Oriental Park
Jamestown	36.64	58.97	Strunk Road / NY 953B to I-86 / NY 17 / Southern Tier Expressway – Binghamton	To exit 11 on I-86
Jamestown	39.24	63.15	NY 394 / NY 60 (West 5th Street / West 4th Street / Washington Street)	Eastern terminus
1.000 mi = 1.609 km; 1.000 km = 0.621 mi: Concurrency terminus; Incomplete access

== See also ==
- State highways in Chautauqua County, New York
