= Sherman, New York (disambiguation) =

Sherman, New York, is the name of two places in Chautauqua County, New York, USA:

- Sherman (town), New York
- Sherman (village), New York, a village in the northern part of the town
