= Long Point State Park on Lake Chautauqua =

State park in Chautauqua County, New York

- Location within New York
- Type: State park
- Location: 4459 Route 430; Bemus Point, New York
- Coordinates: 42°10′48″N 79°24′32″W
- Area: 360 acres (1.5 km^{2})
- Created: 1956
- Operator: New York State Office of Parks, Recreation and Historic Preservation
- Visitors: 62,034 (in 2014)
- Open: All year
- Website: Long Point State Park on Lake Chautauqua

Long Point State Park (on Chautauqua Lake) is a 360-acre (1.5 km^{2}) state park located in the Town of Ellery, near the hamlet of Maple Springs in Chautauqua County, New York. The park is located on a short peninsula on the east side of the lake and can be reached on Route 430.

== History ==
The park was formed from two gifts of former estates on Chautauqua Lake. The first estate was donated to New York State in 1956 by Mr. and Mrs. John W. Minturn; Mrs. Minturn was the granddaughter of former state governor Reuben E. Fenton. The park was expanded several years later with the gift of the summer estate of Bainbridge Colby, former United States Secretary of State under Woodrow Wilson.

== Facilities ==
The park offers a beach, a playground, picnic tables and pavilions, a nature trail, showers, fishing, a boat launch with marine pump-out station, and cross-country skiing and snowmobiling.

== See also ==
- List of New York state parks
