= Ellery, New York =

- Town
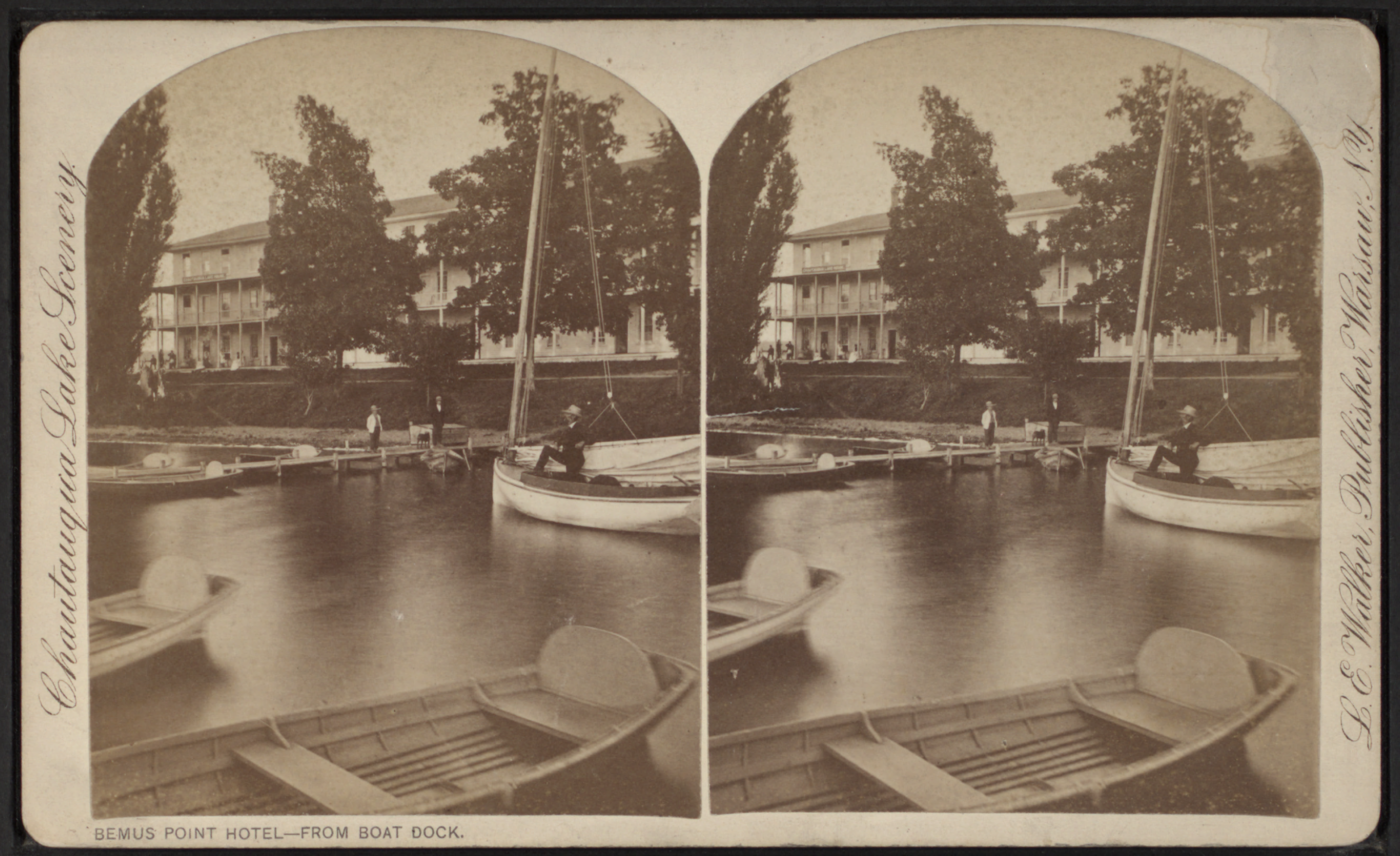
- Bemus Point Hotel and Boat Dock, Bemus Point, NY

- Location within Chautauqua County and New York state

- Location within New York Location within the United States
- Coordinates: 42°10′15″N 79°22′37″W
- Country: United States
- State: New York
- County: Chautauqua

Government
  - Type: Town Council
  - Town Supervisor: Larry Anderson (R)
  - Town Council: Members' List: • John C. Cresanti (R); • Jeremy Crist (R); • Mark R. Schlemmer (R); • David Boughton (R)

Area
  - Total: 47.57 sq mi (123.21 km^{2})
  - Land: 47.45 sq mi (122.90 km^{2})
  - Water: 0.12 sq mi (0.30 km^{2})
- Elevation: 1,594 ft (486 m)

Population (2020)
  - Total: 4,105
  - Estimate (2021): 4,080
  - Density: 93/sq mi (35.8/km^{2})
- Time zone: UTC-5 (Eastern (EST))
  - Summer (DST): UTC-4 (EDT)
- ZIP Codes: 14712 (Bemus Point); 14728 (Dewittville); 14742 (Greenhurst); 14756 (Maple Springs); 14701 (Jamestown); 14782 (Sinclairville)
- Area code: 716
- FIPS code: 36-013-23976
- GNIS feature ID: 0978932
- Website: elleryny.org

Ellery is a town in Chautauqua County, New York, United States, located northwest of Jamestown and with an extended lakefront on the east side of Chautauqua Lake. In the 2020 census, Ellery had a population of 4,105.

== History ==
The area known as Ellery was originally home to the Erie People. The first settlement of European colonists was made circa 1806. The town of Ellery was founded in 1821 from a part of the town of Chautauqua. William Ellery, signer of the Declaration of Independence, is the town's namesake. The lake frontage was developed early as a tourist and recreational location.

== Government ==
The Ellery town government consists of a supervisor, council, and various department heads. The Town Hall/Courtroom is located in the population center of Bemus Point, at 25 Sunnyside Avenue, one block from the Bemus Point Village Hall, Post Office, Library, Fire Department, and Elementary School. Municipal services shared with the Village of Bemus Point include the positions of Codes Enforcement Officer and Assessor.

=== Supervisors ===
The following is a list of supervisors of the town:

#	Supervisor	Took office	Left office	Political party
1	Almon Ives	1821	1822	
2	Peter Loucks	1822	1823	Republican
3	Abijah Clark	1823	1824	
4	Almon Ives	1824	1828	
5	Jonadab Winchester	1828	1829	
6	Robertson Whiteside	1829	1830	
7	John Hammond	1830	1831	
8	Jonadab Winchester	1831	1832	
9	Almon Ives	1832	1833	
10	Odin Benedict	1833	1840	Whig
11	Minot Hoyt	1840	1840	
12	Odin Benedict	1841	1842	Whig
13	George F. Vandervort	1843	1843	
14	Odin Benedict	1844	1847	
15	George F. Vandervort	1848	1848	
16	Odin Benedict	1849	1849	
17	George F. Vandervort	1850	1850	
18	William S. Aldrich	1851	1853	
19	Ira Haskins	1854	1854	
20	Elias Clark	1855	1855	
21	Leman Pickett	1856	1857	
22	Wm. C. Benedict	1858	1863	
23	James Hale	1864	1864	
24	Wm. C. Benedict	1865	1866	
25	John R. Russell	1867	1867	
26	John S. Bemus	1868	1869	
27	Oscar Hale	1870	1871	
28	Wm. C. Benedict	1872	1872	
29	Geo. W. Belden	1873	1874	
30	Oscar Hale	1875	1876	
31	Asa Cheney	1877	1883	Republican
32	Wm. C. Benedict	1884	1885	
33	Oscar Hale	1886	1887	
34	Samuel Weaver	1888	1888	
35	Benj. A. Pickard	1889	1890	
36	S. Dwight Thum	1891	1897	Republican
37	Frank F. Pickard	1898	1905	
38	A.M. Cheney	1906	1917	
39	Orville Casselman	1918	1921	
40	A.M. Cheney	1922	1933	
41	Earl J Parker	1934	1935	
42	Clark L. Lord	1936	1947	Republican
43	Albert S. Samuelson	1948	1949	
44	William G. West	1950	1951	
45	Richard O. Evans	1951	1971	Republican
46	Arden Johnson	1972	2022	Republican
47	Larry Anderson	2022	Incumbent	Republican

== Geography ==
According to the United States Census Bureau, the town has a total area of 47.6 square miles (123.2 km^{2}), of which 47.5 square miles (122.9 km^{2}) is land and 0.12 square miles (0.3 km^{2}), or 0.25%, is water.

The Southern Tier Expressway (Interstate 86 and New York State Route 17) crosses Chautauqua Lake at Bemus Point. New York State Route 430 follows the east shore of Chautauqua Lake. New York State Route 380 is a north-south highway in the eastern part of Ellery.

=== Adjacent towns and locations ===
Ellery is bordered mostly by the town of Stockton to the north, although its northwest corner shares a small border with the town of Chautauqua. Directly to the east of Ellery are the towns of Gerry and Ellicott. Its southern and western edges are mostly bordered by Chautauqua Lake.

== Demographics ==
Historical population
Census	Pop.	Note	%±
1830	2,001		—
1840	2,242		12.0%
1850	2,104		−6.2%
1860	1,751		−16.8%
1870	1,616		−7.7%
1880	1,555		−3.8%
1890	1,789		15.0%
1900	1,628		−9.0%
1910	1,695		4.1%
1920	1,496		−11.7%
1930	1,919		28.3%
1940	2,088		8.8%
1950	2,852		36.6%
1960	3,953		38.6%
1970	4,594		16.2%
1980	4,617		0.5%
1990	4,534		−1.8%
2000	4,574		0.9%
2010	4,528		−1.0%
2020	4,105		−9.3%
2021 (est.)	4,080		−0.6%
U.S. Decennial Census

As of the census of 2000, there were 4,576 people, 1,852 households, and 1,316 families residing in the town. The population density was 96.2 inhabitants per square mile (37.1/km^{2}). There were 2,630 housing units at an average density of 55.3 per square mile (21.4/km^{2}). The racial makeup of the town was 98.40% White, 0.20% African American, 0.22% Native American, 0.17% Asian, 0.57% from other races, and 0.44% from two or more races. Hispanic or Latino of any race were 0.85% of the population.

There were 1,852 households, out of which 29.0% had children under the age of 18 living with them, 60.5% were married couples living together, 7.5% had a female householder with no husband present, and 28.9% were non-families. 26.2% of all households were made up of individuals, and 13.0% had someone living alone who was 65 years of age or older. The average household size was 2.42 and the average family size was 2.91.

In the town, the population was spread out, with 23.8% under the age of 18, 4.8% from 18 to 24, 23.3% from 25 to 44, 28.0% from 45 to 64, and 20.1% who were 65 years of age or older. The median age was 44 years. For every 100 females, there were 95.8 males. For every 100 females age 18 and over, there were 93.0 males.

The median income for a household in the town was $41,916, and the median income for a family was $48,093. Males had a median income of $40,733 versus $29,128 for females. The per capita income for the town was $20,619. About 6.1% of families and 8.3% of the population were below the poverty line, including 12.5% of those under age 18 and 4.4% of those age 65 or over.

As of the Census of 2010, there were 4,528 (a decrease of 48 people or 1.05%) and 1,891 households (an increase of 39 households or 2.11%). The population density was 95.1 inhabitants per square mile (36.7/km^{2}). The racial makeup of the town was: 97.9% (4,433 people) white; 0.49% (22 people) African-American; 0.49% (22 people) Asian; 0.07% (3 people) Native American/Alaskan; 0.11% (5 people) other; and 0.95% (43 people) two or more races. The Hispanic/Latino population of any race was 0.60% (27 people).

In the town, the population was spread out, with 19.92% (902 people) under the age of 18, 1.83% ages (83 people) 18 and 19, 3.34% (151 people) ages 20–24, 6.45% (292 people) ages 25–34, 19.46% (881 people) ages 35–49, 25.20% (1,141 people) ages 50–64, and 23.81% (1,078 people) over the age of 65. Of the population, 48.96% (2,217 people) were male and 51.04% (2,311 people) were female.

== Communities and locations in Ellery ==
- Alden Corners – A location north of Ellery Center at the crossing of County Route 52 and Slide Joslyn Road.
- Bayview – A lakeside hamlet north of Bemus Point.
- Belleview – A small lakeside community on Route 430 in the south part of the town.
- Bemus Bay – A bay on Chautauqua Lake between Long Point State Park and Bemus Point.
- Bemus Point – The village of Bemus Point, named after a projection of land into Chautauqua Lake.
- Chedwel – A lakeside community along the north shore of the town.
- Colburns – A hamlet on the shore of the lake and on Route 430 south of Bemus Point.
- Crosswinds – A marina community on Route 430 in the northwest corner of the town.
- Driftwood – A lakeside community south of Colburns.
- Dutch Hollow Creek – A stream that flows southward from Ellery Center and enters Chautauqua Lake between Greenhurst and Sunnyside.
- Ellery Center – A hamlet at the junction of County Roads 44, 46, 48, and 57.
- Greenhurst – A lakeside hamlet in the south part of the town.
- Griffiths – A lakeside hamlet in the south part of the town.
- Jones Corners – A hamlet at the intersection of County Roads 52 and 57.
- Long Point State Park – On Route 430 on the east shore of the lake.
- Maple Springs – A lakeside hamlet north of Long Point State Park.
- Midway Park – A location on the lake shore north of Long Point State Park.
- Oriental Park – A hamlet bordering Bemus Point on the south.
- Phillips Mill – A hamlet on the shore of Chautauqua Lake.
- Point Stockholm – A lakeside community.
- Red Bird – A hamlet on County Route 380 in the northeast town corner.
- Sheldon Hall – A lakeside community in the south part of the town.
- Sunnyside – A lakeside community in the south part of the town.
- Sunset Bay – A community of homes and cottages located by a bay with the same name on Chautauqua Lake.
- Towerville – A hamlet at the junction of County Road 48 and Route 380 in the northeast town corner.
- Watermans Corners – A hamlet on the junction of County Road 52, Thumb Road and Bayview Road in the north part of the town.
- West Ellery – A hamlet in the north part of the town on County Road 46.
- Willow Brook – A location north of Bemus Point.
- Warner Bay - A community of homes and cottages along the bay on Chautauqua Lake with the same name.
