= Camp Onyahsa =

YMCA summer camp in Dewittville, New York

- Interactive map of Camp Onyahsa
- Coordinates: 42.233594°N 79.442847°W
- Website: www.onyahsa.org

Camp Onyahsa is a YMCA summer camp located on Lake Chautauqua in Dewittville, New York, and one of the oldest summer camps in the U.S. The word Onyahsa is purported to be Haudonosaunee in origin, and relates to the shape of the Lake. The Camp was given this name by director, Roy Wagner, in 1924. According to Camp legend, the word is used for "hello" and "goodbye." It was established in 1898 by YMCA of Jamestown, New York and served boys from this growing industrial town as well as males from Westfield, NY and Buffalo, NY during its first decades. In 1924, the camp moved from rented acreage near Cheney's Point, on Chautauqua Lake to Dewittville, NY. The property was purchased for $12,000 from funds generated through Jamestown YMCA's capital campaign in 1925. At this time, Roy A. Wagner directed both the summer camp and the Boys Department of YMCA. He led both programs until his resignation in 1946. After several short-term directors, Spiro Bello became director in 1962 and directed Onyahsa and Jamestown YMCA's Youth Department until his retirement in 1984.

== Background ==
Onyahsa has been home to mostly New York kids, but has accommodated youth from across the United States, and all over the world. International campers include youth from Spain, France, Japan, China, Canada, and many other countries. The staff is also very diverse having members from Denver, Virginia, New York, Ohio, Pennsylvania, Boston, New Jersey, Maryland, Quebec, Japan, Sweden, and Spain. The Mess Hall, originally constructed in 1938, represent the national flags of former campers and staff. Along with the main lakefront campus, Onyahsa has acquired over 150 acres of "forever wild" woodlands across East Lake Road. Along with the traditional overnight camping experience, Onyahsa offers many specialty camps, day camping, teen camp, leader training, and school-year monthly overnights. The site also rents it facility to groups for overnight events, weddings, or other uses from September to June.
