= Jay LaDue =

American politician

Jay LaDue (April 7, 1827 – October 12, 1926) was an American farmer and politician.

LaDue was born in Sherman, Chautauqua County, New York. He went to the public schools. In 1856, LaDue moved to Luverne, Rock County, Minnesota with his wife and family and was a farmer. LaDue served in the Minnesota Senate from 1891 to 1894.
