= Stow, New York =

- Hamlet
- Location within New York Location within the United States
- Coordinates: 42°09′24″N 79°24′05″W
- Country: United States
- State: New York
- County: Chautauqua
- Town: North Harmony
- Elevation: 1,312 ft (400 m)
- Time zone: UTC-5 (Eastern (EST))
  - Summer (DST): UTC-4 (EDT)
- ZIP code: 14785
- Area code: 716
- GNIS feature ID: 966608

Stow is a hamlet in Chautauqua County, New York, United States. The community is located along the western shore of Chautauqua Lake; a ferry connects it to Bemus Point on the eastern shore. Stow has a post office with ZIP code 14785, which opened on December 6, 1880.
