= Westfield, New York =

- Town
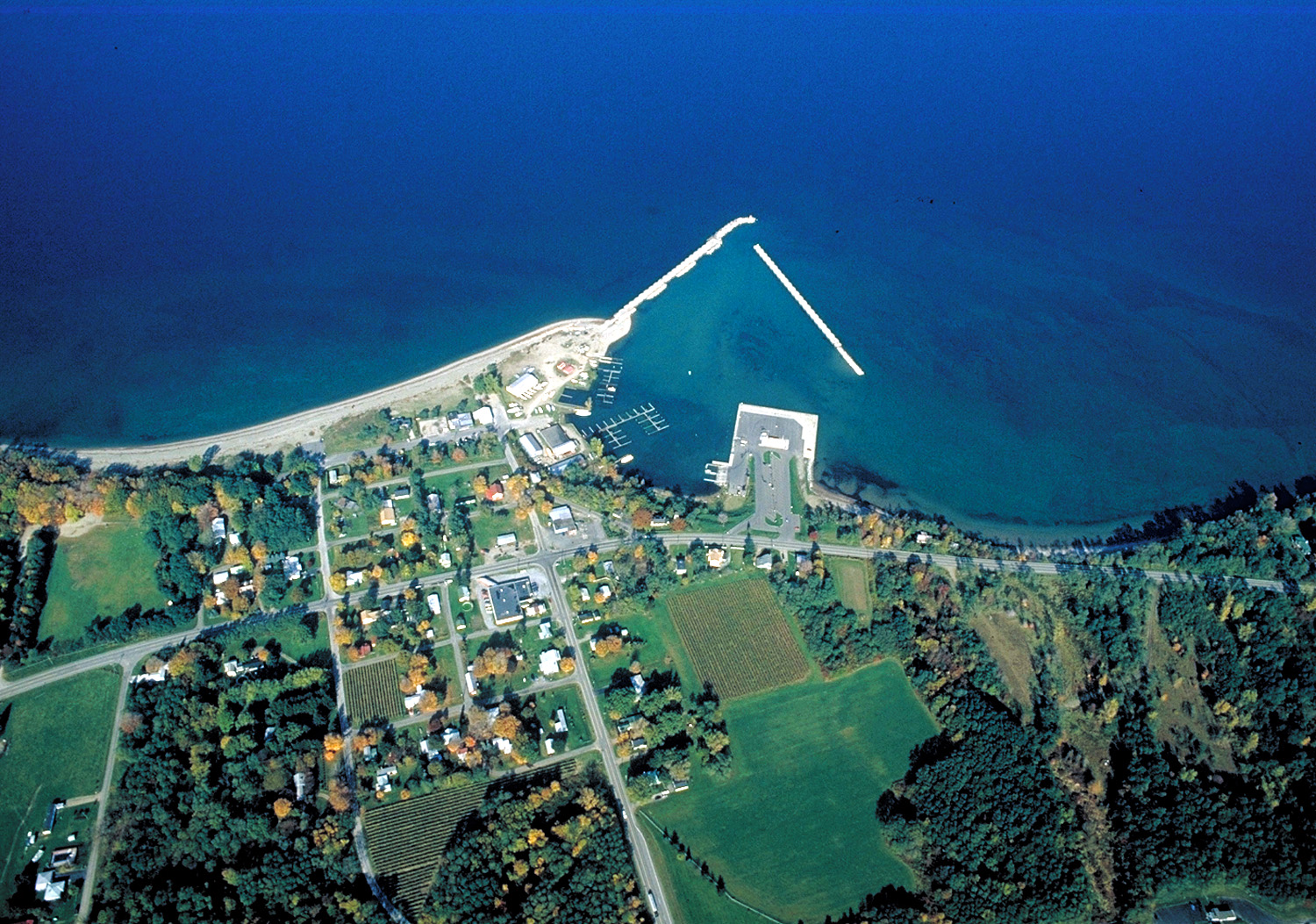
- Aerial view of Barcelona in the northern part of the town of Westfield. View is to the north over Lake Erie.

- Location within Chautauqua County and New York state

- Location within New York Location within the United States
- Coordinates: 42°19′N 79°35′W
- Country: United States
- State: New York
- County: Chautauqua
- Settled: 1802
- Created: 1823

Government
  - Type: Town Council
  - Town Supervisor: Martha R. Bills (R)
  - Town Council: Members' List: • James R. Herbert, Sr. (R); • David S. Brown (R); • Raymond L. Schuster (R); • David A. Spann (R)

Area
  - Total: 47.25 sq mi (122.38 km^{2})
  - Land: 47.19 sq mi (122.21 km^{2})
  - Water: 0.066 sq mi (0.17 km^{2})
- Elevation: 754 ft (230 m)

Population (2020)
  - Total: 4,545
  - Estimate (2021): 4,513
  - Density: 99.1/sq mi (38.28/km^{2})
- ZIP Codes: 14787 (Westfield); 14775 (Ripley); 14781 (Sherman)
- FIPS code: 36-013-79950
- Website: www.townofwestfield.org

Westfield is a town in the western part of Chautauqua County, New York, United States. The population was 4,513 at the 2020 census. Westfield is also the name of a village within the town, containing 65% of the town's population. This unique town is accompanied by vineyards, gorges and historical buildings.

== History ==
The area was first settled in 1802 by James McMahan, formerly of Northumberland County, Pennsylvania. McMahan established a mill near the mouth of Chautauqua Creek, where it empties into Lake Erie. The mill was later dismantled in advance of the War of 1812 to prevent it from falling into the hands of the British. Today some of the millstones from McMahan's mill rest outside the Patterson Library in Westfield village.

The town of Westfield was established in 1828 from parts of the towns of Portland and Ripley.

The Barcelona Lighthouse was constructed in 1829 to overlook Barcelona Harbor and aided sailors on Lake Erie until being deactivated in 1859. It was the first lighthouse in the world to be powered by natural gas.

In 1897, the founder of Welch's Grape Juice, Charles E. Welch, moved his company to Westfield from New Jersey to take advantage of the ideal climate for the cultivation of grapes, particularly of Concord grapes. The region soon became noted for the growing of grapes for both wine and grape juice.

An unusually large number of buildings, twenty in all, are listed on the National Register of Historic Places, with all but one (the Barcelona Lighthouse, listed in 1972) being listed on the register in fall 1983.

== Geography ==
According to the United States Census Bureau, the town of Westfield has a total area of 47.3 square miles (122.4 km^{2}), of which 47.2 square miles (122.2 km^{2}) is land and 0.08 square miles (0.2 km^{2}), or 0.14%, is water.

=== Surrounding towns or areas ===
(Clockwise)

- Lake Erie
- Portland; Chautauqua
- Sherman
- Ripley

Chautauqua Creek serves as much of the boundary between Westfield and Chautauqua.

== Demographics ==
Historical population
Census	Pop.	Note	%±
1830	2,476		—
1840	3,199		29.2%
1850	3,100		−3.1%
1860	3,640		17.4%
1870	3,645		0.1%
1880	3,323		−8.8%
1890	3,401		2.3%
1900	3,882		14.1%
1910	4,481		15.4%
1920	4,300		−4.0%
1930	4,785		11.3%
1940	4,638		−3.1%
1950	5,001		7.8%
1960	5,498		9.9%
1970	5,200		−5.4%
1980	5,102		−1.9%
1990	5,194		1.8%
2000	5,232		0.7%
2010	4,896		−6.4%
2020	4,545		−7.2%
2021 (est.)	4,513	▼	−0.7%
U.S. Decennial Census

As of the census of 2000, there were 5,232 people, 2,075 households, and 1,419 families residing in the town. The population density was 110.8 inhabitants per square mile (42.8/km^{2}). There were 2,493 housing units at an average density of 52.8 per square mile (20.4/km^{2}). The racial makeup of the town was 96.98% White, 0.27% Black or African American, 0.25% Native American, 0.54% Asian, 1.30% from other races, and 0.67% from two or more races. Hispanic or Latino of any race were 2.64% of the population.

There were 2,075 households, out of which 31.6% had children under the age of 18 living with them, 55.3% were married couples living together, 9.7% had a female householder with no husband present, and 31.6% were non-families. 27.2% of all households were made up of individuals, and 11.8% had someone living alone who was 65 years of age or older. The average household size was 2.46 and the average family size was 2.98.

In the town, the population was spread out, with 25.4% under the age of 18, 6.8% from 18 to 24, 25.7% from 25 to 44, 24.2% from 45 to 64, and 18.0% who were 65 years of age or older. The median age was 40 years. For every 100 females, there were 93.2 males. For every 100 females age 18 and over, there were 91.0 males.

The median income for a household in the town was $32,534, and the median income for a family was $43,156. Males had a median income of $30,203 versus $23,250 for females. The per capita income for the town was $15,738. About 8.8% of families and 13.8% of the population were below the poverty line, including 17.0% of those under age 18 and 14.8% of those age 65 or over.

== Economy ==
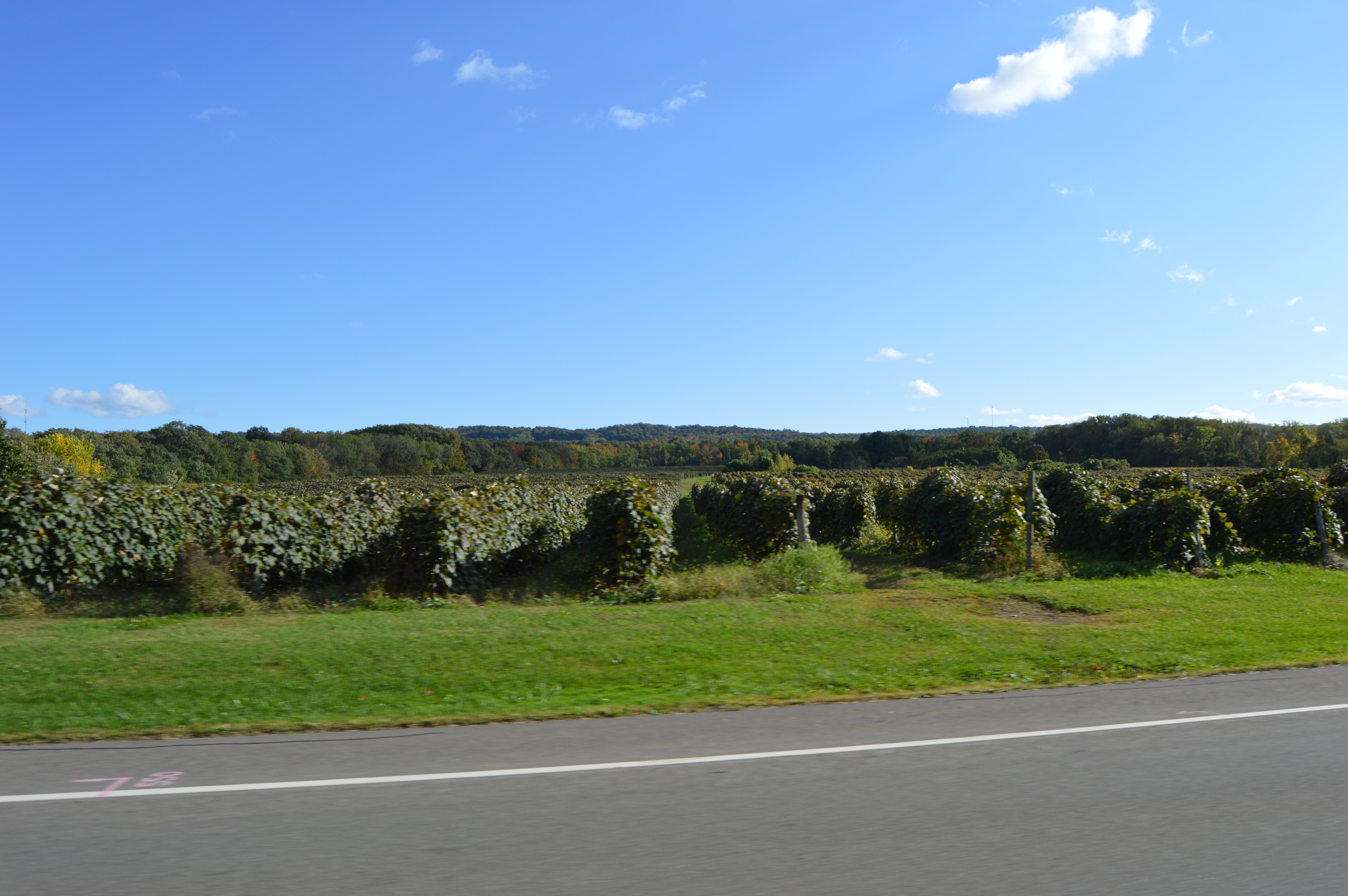
Vineyards along U.S. Route 20 west of the village of Westfield

The economy of the town is primarily agriculture, and the major crop is grapes. The Welch Grape Juice Company has ties to this region.

== Infrastructure ==
=== Transportation ===
The New York State Thruway (Interstate 90), US 20, NY 5, and NY 394 pass through the town.

CSX Transportation and Norfolk Southern both have routes running through Westfield. CSX operates a double-track mainline on the former New York Central "Water Level Route", and Norfolk Southern operates over former Nickel Plate Road, later Norfolk and Western, trackage. Both routes come east out of Cleveland to Buffalo.

As recently as 1967, the New York Central Railroad had a train, Empire State Express, (#51) making a stop westbound in Westfield itself, and the Fifth Avenue-Cleveland Limited (#6) and the Chicagoan (#90) stopping eastbound in Westfield. As recently as January 1968 the New York Central operated a Buffalo-Chicago daytime train, #51, the then former Empire State Express, that made a stop westbound. Two other daily trains eastbound stopped in Westfield, #64 and #90, the then former Chicagoan. Amtrak's Lake Shore Limited passes twice daily on the CSX tracks but does not stop. The closest stops are Erie, to the west, and Buffalo-Depew station, to the east.

== Notable people ==
- Grace Bedell, girl who suggested to then-candidate Abraham Lincoln that he should grow a beard
- Francis B. Brewer, US congressman
- George Emerson Brewer, surgeon, urologist
- Jimmy Caci, member of the Los Angeles crime family
- Harry Castlemon, writer
- Marion Dickerman, vice-principal of the Todhunter School
- Lou DiMuro, Major League Baseball umpire
- Charles G. Groat, geologist
- George W. Patterson, US congressman for the 33rd district and Lieutenant Governor of New York
- Robert Weathers, former NFL running back
- Alexander Wilson, former Wisconsin Attorney General
- John Wrench, mathematician
- John H. Haight, Medal of Honor recipient in the American Civil War

== Communities and locations in Westfield ==
- Barcelona – A hamlet located by Barcelona Harbor, a harbor in Lake Erie.
- Bournes Beach – A community at the mouth of Bournes Creek in the northeast corner of the town.
- Camp Vernon Airport – A small airfield between I-90 and Route 5 in the northeast corner of the town.
- Forest Park – A small community on Lake Erie southwest of Barcelona.
- Hawthorne Park – A lakeside community near Bournes Beach.
- Lombard – A hamlet located in the western part of the town at the crossing of Lombard, Pigeon, and Parker Roads.
- Volusia – A hamlet near Chautauqua Creek in the eastern part of the town.
- Westfield – A village at the junction of Route 394 and Route 20 in the northern part of the town.
