= Barcelona Light =

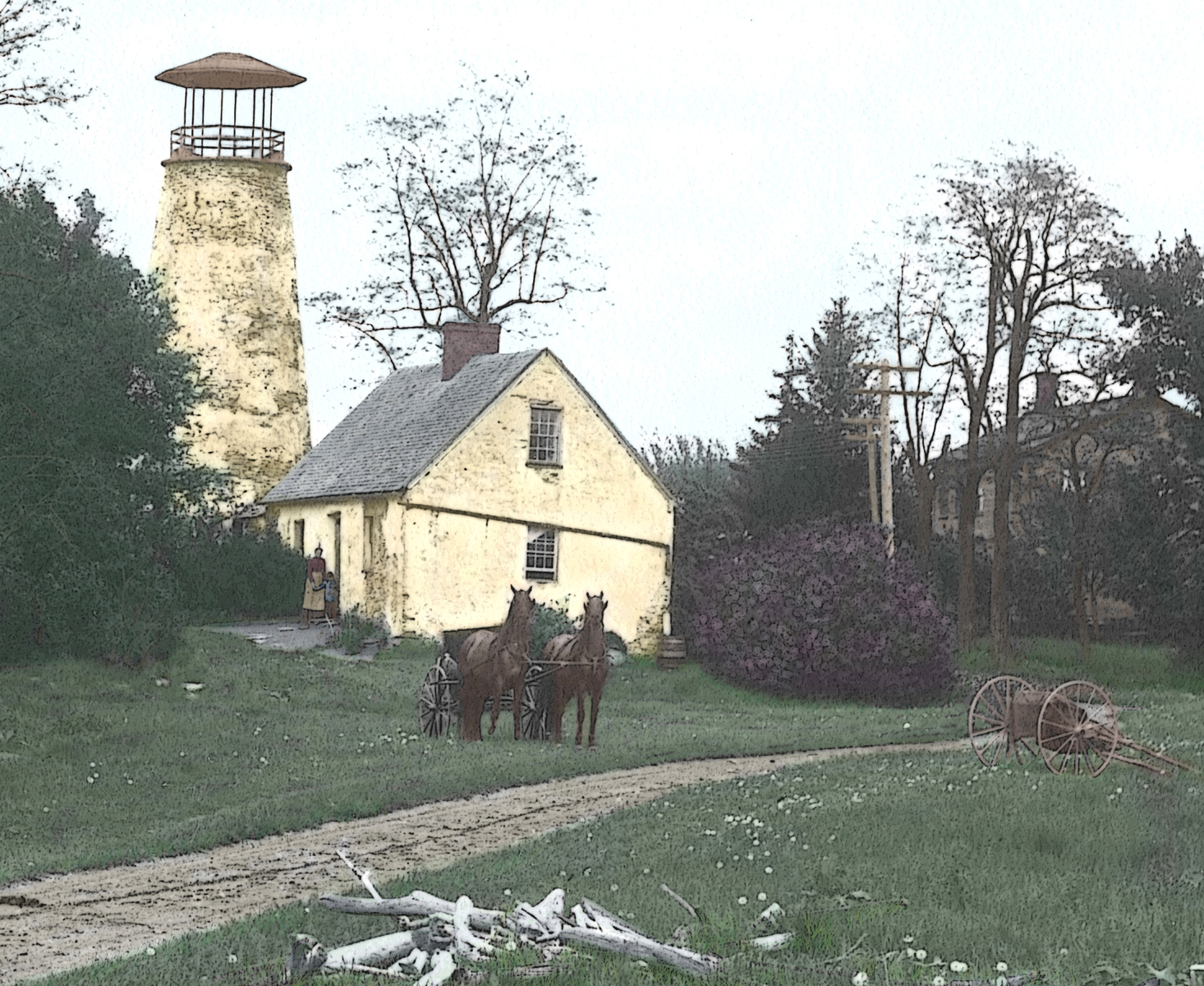
- Historical view of Barcelona Lighthouse from the southwest
- Location: Barcelona Harbor on Lake Erie in Westfield (town), New York
- Coordinates: 42°20′27″N 79°35′42″W

Tower
- Constructed: 1829; 197 years ago
- Foundation: Natural emplaced
- Construction: Fieldstone
- Height: 40 feet (12 m)
- Shape: Conical
- Markings: Natural
- Heritage: National Register of Historic Places listed place

Light
- First lit: 1829; 197 years ago
- Deactivated: 1859; 167 years ago
- Lens: 11 lamps with 14-inch (360 mm) reflectors
- Barcelona Lighthouse
- U.S. National Register of Historic Places
- Area: 0 acres (0 ha)
- NRHP reference No.: 72000825
- Added to NRHP: April 13, 1972; 54 years ago

Barcelona Light, also known as Portland Harbor Light, is a lighthouse overlooking Barcelona Harbor on Lake Erie in the Town of Westfield, New York.

== History ==
Westfield was once part of the Town of Portland and the natural harbor there was known as Portland Harbor. When the Town of Westfield was established formally in 1823, the harbor area became known as Barcelona.

The lighthouse was established in 1829 through the efforts of Thomas B. Campbell. The conical tower and attached keeper's cottage were constructed of fieldstone, with a natural, emplaced foundation. The light was emitted by eleven lamps with 14-inch (360 mm) reflectors. It was the first lighthouse in the world to be powered by natural gas, which Campbell transported from a "burning spring" about a mile distant by means of wooden pipes. Thirty years later, in 1859, the lighthouse was deactivated, but it still stands lit today after over 100 years in private ownership, it is now owned by the New York State Office of Parks, Recreation, and Historic Preservation.

The lighthouse was added to the National Register of Historic Places in 1972.

The lighthouse was in the path of totality for the 2024 solar eclipse, with 3 minute and 43 seconds of totality.

== Historical information from Coast Guard site ==
Congress appropriated $5,000 on May 23, 1828, "for building a lighthouse at a proper site, at or near Portland, on Lake Erie, in the State of New York." The site was purchased for $50 and contract was made to erect a lighthouse and dwelling which cost $3,456.78. The first keeper appointed May 27, 1829, was Joshua Lane, a "deaf, superannuated clergyman, having numerous female dependents" whose salary was $350 per annum. The first light apparatus was described in the contract as 11 patent lamps with 11 14 inch reflectors and 2 spare lamps. There were double tin oil butts for 500 US gallons (1,900 L; 420 imp gal) of oil. No mention was made at that time of equipment for burning natural gas.

On January 1, 1831, a contract was made to provide the light with natural gas "at all times and seasons" and to keep the apparatus and fixtures in repair at an annual cost of $213. This was described at the time as follows: "The Lighthouse at Portland Harbor in the County of Chautauqua and State of New York, is now illuminated, in the most splendid style, by natural carburetted hydrogen gas. Ever since the first settlement of the country about Portland, it has been known that an inflammable gas constantly issued from the fissures of a rock, which forms the bed of a little brook that empties into Lake Erie, near the harbor, in such quantity as to be easily set on fire by applying a flame to it. This fountain of gas was known to the early settlers of the country by the name of the 'burning spring.’ No valuable use, however, was made of this gas until Mr. W. A. Hart, an ingenious gunsmith of the village of Fredonia, and some other young mechanics, five or six years ago, collected a quantity of similar gas from the rocky bed of Canadaway creek in a reservoir, and conveyed it from thence to all the principal stores, taverns, and shops in the said village, where it is still used instead of lamps."

In the fall of 1829, on completion of the lighthouse at Portland Harbor, several persons associated together for the purpose of conveying the gas from the "burning spring" to the lighthouse. They dug into the rock at the place where the largest quantity of gas was found, in the form of a common well, about 40 or 50 feet (12 or 15 m) in diameter and 3 feet (0.91 m) deep. Over this well they erected a cone of solid mason work, so tight as to contain the gas which should collect within it, and at the same time exclude the water around it. They inserted a pipe at the base of the cone; bent down the end toward the bottom of the well; and then extended the pipe along on the bed of the brook to its termination below the dam. From that point it was conducted by pipes buried in the ground the distance of 230 rods (3,800 ft; 1,200 m) to the lighthouse.

A stand of lamps adapted to the reception, emission, and burning of the gas was next invented and constructed by Mr. Hart. These consisted of several horizontal arms extended like the radii of a semicircle, at the end of each of which a brass pipe was attached. The quantity of gas consumed by each burner was regulated by a stopcock. Each burner had a large and suitable reflector. There were two tiers of these lamps, seven on the lower tier and six in the upper, interspaced so that, when viewed from the lake at night, the whole tower represented one complete, constant and unwavering blaze.

"Altogether" the account continues "this is one of the greatest natural, philosophical and mechanical curiosities which the country can produce. As a light for a lighthouse it exceeds, both in quantity and brilliancy, anything of the kind I ever saw."

In November 1838 it was reported, however, that "Owing to a failure of gas, that may be attributed to the excessive draught, oil is now substituted. It is presumed, however, that the fall rains will replenish the stream from which the fountain is supplied, and thus prevent the escape and loss of the gas."

In 1851 the report read: "We have one lighthouse at Portland on Lake Erie, lighted with natural gas, carried a distance of 2 miles in pipes to the tower; and even here we are obliged to keep oil and lamps, as water frequently collects in the pipes, over which the gas will not pass, and whilst they are being taken up and freed from water, oil light has to be used. We have a contract for supplying this gas at the annual cost of the oil which would be required, if lighted with that material."

The Portland Harbor (Barcelona) Light was discontinued in 1859 and in 1872 the buildings were sold to the highest bidder. It was acquired by the New York State Office of Parks, Recreation & Historic Preservation in 2007 as a historic site.
