= Bainbridge Colby =

American politician (1869–1950)

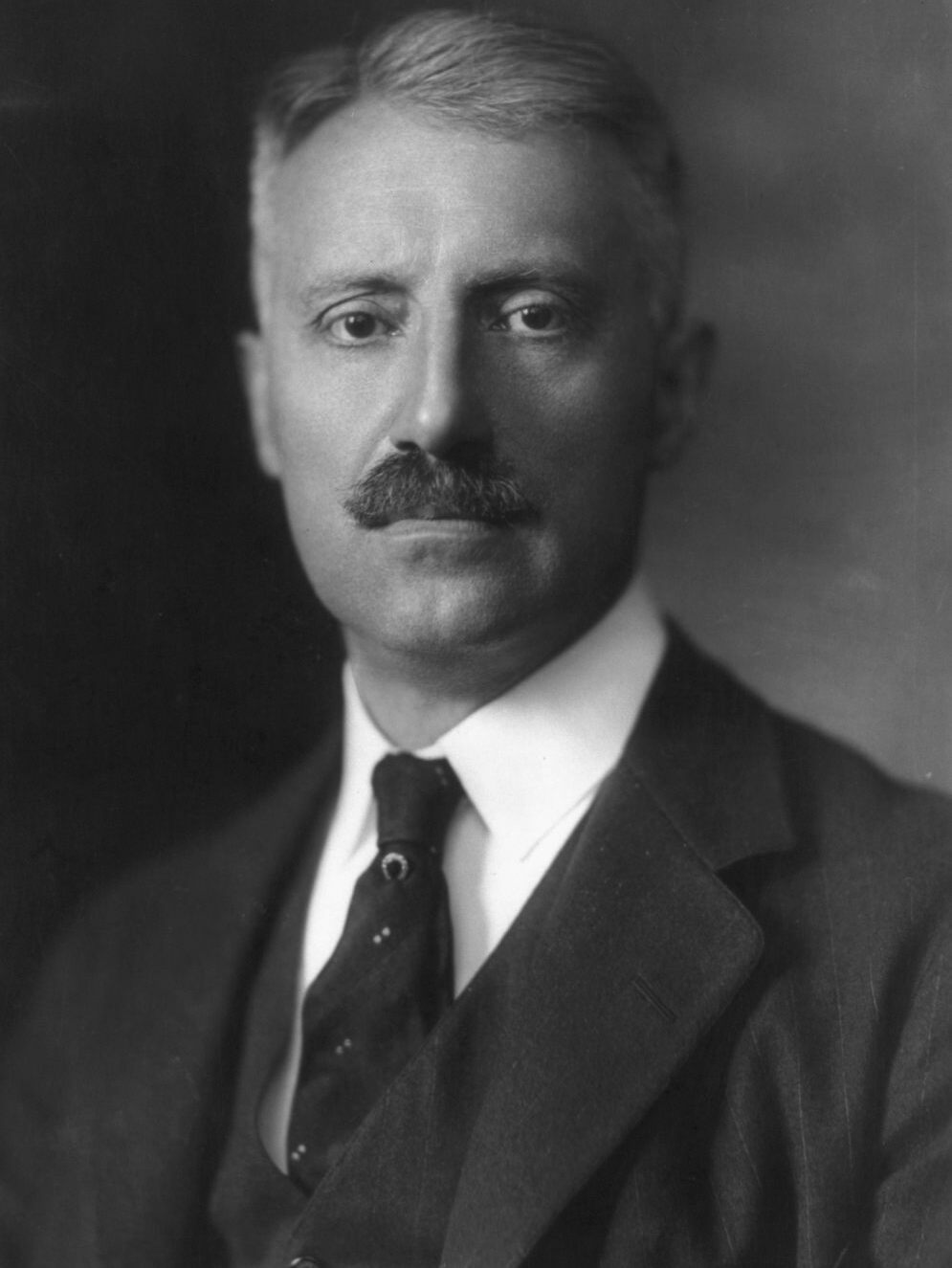
- Colby in 1920

43rd United States Secretary of State
- In office February 13, 1920 – March 4, 1921
- President: Woodrow Wilson
- Preceded by: Robert Lansing
- Succeeded by: Charles Evans Hughes

Member of the New York State Assembly from the 29th New York County district
- In office January 1, 1901 – December 31, 1902
- Preceded by: Hal Bell
- Succeeded by: George B. Clark

Personal details
- Born: December 22, 1869 St. Louis, Missouri, U.S.
- Died: April 11, 1950 (aged 80) Bemus Point, New York, U.S.
- Party: Republican (Before 1912); Progressive (1912–1920); Democratic (1920–1950)
- Other political affiliations: Independence (1916)
- Spouse(s): Nathalie Sedgwick; Ann Ahlstrand Ely
- Children: 7
- Education: Williams College (BA); New York Law School (LLB)

Bainbridge Colby (December 22, 1869 – April 11, 1950) was an American politician and attorney who was a co-founder of the United States Progressive Party and Woodrow Wilson's last Secretary of State. Colby was a Republican until he helped co-found the National Progressive Party in 1912; he ran for multiple offices as a member of that party, but did not win any.

Colby served as Secretary of State from February 1920 until 1921, at a time when President Woodrow Wilson was medically handicapped and largely out of touch. He is best known for promoting a Good Neighbor policy for Latin America, and for denouncing the communist regime in Russia.

== Early life and education ==
Bainbridge Colby was born in St. Louis, Missouri on December 22, 1869. He graduated from Williams College, where he was admitted to Phi Beta Kappa, then attended Columbia Law School and New York Law School (1892).

== Career ==
He was admitted to the New York bar, and served as a member of the New York State Assembly (New York Co., 29th D.) 1901–1902. He spoke at the Colby College commencement on June 19, 1933, at which time he was awarded an honorary Doctor of Laws degree.

=== Politics ===
At the 1914 New York state election, Colby ran on the Progressive ticket for U.S. Senator from New York, but was defeated by Republican James W. Wadsworth, Jr. At the 1916 New York state election, he ran again, this time on the Progressive and Independence League tickets, but was defeated by Republican William M. Calder.

During World War I, Colby was a member of the United States Shipping Board.

Colby was a special assistant to the United States Attorney General in an anti-trust action in 1917, and represented the U.S. at the Inter-Allied Conference at Paris the same year.

=== Secretary of State ===
Wilson appointed him Secretary of State on March 23, 1920, after firing his predecessor, Robert Lansing, for insubordination. Wilson's appointment of Colby was "bizarre," says historian John Milton Cooper, for Colby had no diplomatic experience or skills. Editorial responses from leading newspapers ranged "from puzzlement to outrage." Colby was chosen because he was totally loyal to Wilson.

On August 26, eight days after ratification of the Nineteenth Amendment, Colby issued the official proclamation that it had become a part of the Constitution of the United States, guaranteeing women the right to vote. In December 1920, Colby embarked on the battleship Florida for an official goodwill cruise to South America. His goodwill trip set the stage for the transition to a "Good Neighbor" policy.

Colby advocated his policies firmly even as Wilson suffered the debilitating side effects of a series of strokes. Colby supported the League of Nations and established a precedent for not recognizing newly Communist Russia; that would be reversed in 1933. In a major statement in 1920, Colby declared:

It is not possible for the Government of the United States to recognize the present rulers of Russia as a government with which the relations common to friendly governments can be maintained. This conviction has nothing to do with any particular political or social structure which the Russian people themselves may see fit to embrace. It rests upon a wholly different set of facts....that the existing regime in Russia is based upon the negation of every principle of honor and good faith, and every usage and convention, underlying the whole structure of international law; the negation, in short, of every principle upon which it is possible to base harmonious and trustful relations, whether of nations or of individuals. The responsible leaders of the regime have frequently and openly boasted that they are willing to sign agreements and undertakings with foreign Powers while not having the slightest intention of observing such undertakings or carrying out such agreements....it is their understanding that the very existence of Bolshevism in Russia, the maintenance of their own rule, depends, and must continue to depend, upon the occurrence of revolutions in all other great civilized nations, including the United States, which will overthrow and destroy their governments and set up Bolshevist rule in their stead. They have made it quite plain that they intend to use every means, including, of course, diplomatic agencies, to promote such revolutionary movements in other countries.

He served until Wilson left office on March 4, 1921.

The Library of Congress maintains a collection of Colby’s documents.

=== Later career ===
After leaving office as secretary of state, Colby continued to practice law for the remainder of his career. As an attorney, Colby accepted Woodrow Wilson as a partner after the latter's presidency; Colby left that firm in 1923. Earlier in his career, Colby's most notable client was Mark Twain. Colby addressed the fractious 1924 Democratic National Convention as the chief spokesman for the minority of delegates that unsuccessfully sought a platform plank denouncing the then-powerful Ku Klux Klan by name.

Colby was a prominent member of the American Liberty League, a group of wealthy, anti-New Deal Democrats. He eventually supported the Republican candidate, Alf Landon, over Franklin Roosevelt in 1936.

== Personal life ==
Colby was married twice. His first wife was Nathalie Sedgwick, who became a novelist; they were married in 1895 and had three children (Katherine Sedgwick Colby, Nathalie Sedgwick Colby and Frances Bainbridge Colby). Colby decided to divorce his wife while he was in Paris in 1928. The divorce was finalized in Reno, Nevada later that year. The marriage apparently was very contentious and Colby felt the need to include in his divorce decree a monthly payment of $1,500.00 to stop Nathalie from "ridiculing him in her writings". Less than a year later, he married Anne Ahlstrand Ely, who was politically engaged in many of the same issues as Colby, such as women's suffrage. (As Secretary of State, Colby would issue the proclamation announcing that the 19th Amendment, guaranteeing women the right to vote, had been ratified as part of the U.S. Constitution.)

Colby died in 1950. He is buried in Bemus Point, New York. After his death, his widow donated much memorabilia to the local library; it eventually found a home at the Library of Congress. She never remarried and died in 1963. At the time of his death, Colby was the last surviving member of the Wilson Cabinet.

New York State Assembly
Preceded by Hal Bell	New York State Assembly; New York County, 29th District; 1902	Succeeded by George B. Clark
Political offices
Preceded by Robert Lansing	U.S. Secretary of State; Served under: Woodrow Wilson; 1920 – 1921	Succeeded by Charles Evans Hughes
