= Sherman, New York =

- Town
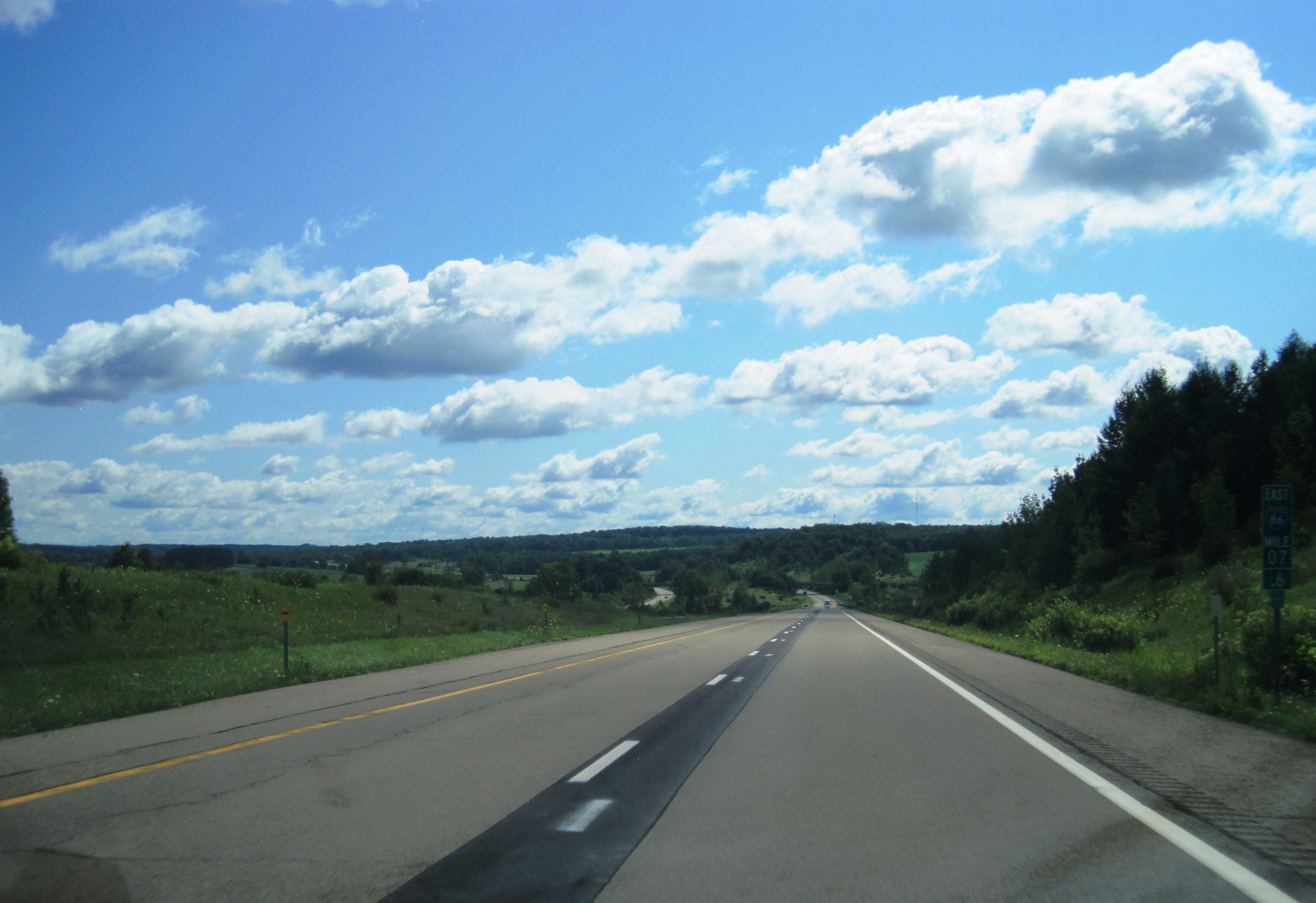
- Scenery of Sherman along eastbound I-86

- Location within Chautauqua County and New York state

- Location within New York Location within the United States
- Coordinates: 42°09′33″N 79°35′44″W
- Country: United States
- State: New York
- County: Chautauqua
- Settled: 1823
- Created: 1924

Government
  - Type: Town Council
  - Town Supervisor: Mark D. Persons (R)
  - Town Council: Members' List: • Bessie V. Endress (R); • Howard E. Crump (R); • Gerald W. Russell (R); • James L. Higginbotham (R)

Area
  - Total: 36.40 sq mi (94.28 km^{2})
  - Land: 36.27 sq mi (93.94 km^{2})
  - Water: 0.13 sq mi (0.34 km^{2})
- Elevation: 1,550 ft (470 m)

Population (2020)
  - Total: 1,618
  - Estimate (2021): 1,630
  - Density: 44.1/sq mi (17.02/km^{2})
- ZIP Codes: 14781 (Sherman); 14724 (Clymer); 14767 (Panama)
- FIPS code: 36-013-66960
- Website: www.shermanny.gov

Sherman is a town in Chautauqua County, New York, United States. It is an interior town in the county, west of Chautauqua Lake. As of the 2020 census, the town population was 1,618. The town contains the village of Sherman.

== History ==
The area was first settled around 1823. The town of Sherman was formed in 1824 from the town of Mina.

The source of the town's name is Roger Sherman, a signer of the Declaration of Independence.

== Geography ==
According to the United States Census Bureau, the town has a total area of 36.4 square miles (94.3 km^{2}), of which 36.3 square miles (93.9 km^{2}) is land and 0.12 square miles (0.3 km^{2}), or 0.36%, is water.

The Southern Tier Expressway (Interstate 86 and New York State Highway 17) passes across the north part of the town. Access is from Exit 6 on the south side of Sherman village.

=== Adjacent towns and areas ===
(Clockwise)

- Westfield; Chautauqua
- North Harmony
- Clymer
- Mina

== Regular events ==
- The Brushwood Folklore Center in Sherman plays annual host to the Sirius Rising pagan festival and spent many years hosting the Starwood Festival before it was moved to Wisteria in Athens, Ohio.
- The Great Blue Heron Music Festival has been held in Sherman every July since 1992. The festival grounds expanded into other events including the Night Lights Music Festival (Electronic Music) in 2011 and the Great Rhythm Revival. They have also held a Bluegrass Festival in 2015 and a Farm Conference in 2018.
- Sherman Day is the first Saturday in August.

== Demographics ==
Historical population
Census	Pop.	Note	%±
1840	1,899		—
1850	1,292		−32.0%
1860	1,394		7.9%
1870	1,470		5.5%
1880	1,558		6.0%
1890	1,531		−1.7%
1900	1,560		1.9%
1910	1,558		−0.1%
1920	1,467		−5.8%
1930	1,350		−8.0%
1940	1,101		−18.4%
1950	1,611		46.3%
1960	1,511		−6.2%
1970	1,428		−5.5%
1980	1,490		4.3%
1990	1,505		1.0%
2000	1,553		3.2%
2010	1,653		6.4%
2020	1,618		−2.1%
2021 (est.)	1,630	▲	0.7%
U.S. Decennial Census

As of the census of 2000, there were 1,553 people, 546 households, and 400 families residing in the town. The population density was 42.8 inhabitants per square mile (16.5/km^{2}). There were 631 housing units at an average density of 17.4 per square mile (6.7/km^{2}). The racial makeup of the town was 97.88% White, 0.32% Black or African American, 0.19% Native American, 0.39% Asian, 0.06% Pacific Islander, 0.19% from other races, and 0.97% from two or more races. Hispanic or Latino of any race were 0.19% of the population.

There were 546 households, out of which 40.7% had children under the age of 18 living with them, 61.2% were married couples living together, 9.0% had a female householder with no husband present, and 26.6% were non-families. 22.0% of all households were made up of individuals, and 10.8% had someone living alone who was 65 years of age or older. The average household size was 2.84 and the average family size was 3.36.

In the town, the population was spread out, with 32.1% under the age of 18, 9.2% from 18 to 24, 26.4% from 25 to 44, 21.8% from 45 to 64, and 10.5% who were 65 years of age or older. The median age was 33 years. For every 100 females, there were 100.4 males. For every 100 females age 18 and over, there were 99.1 males.

The median income for a household in the town was $32,969, and the median income for a family was $39,083. Males had a median income of $26,121 versus $21,250 for females. The per capita income for the town was $13,947. About 9.5% of families and 11.9% of the population were below the poverty line, including 16.1% of those under age 18 and 5.9% of those age 65 or over.

== Communities and locations in the town ==
- Sherman – A village in the north part of the town.
- Slab City – A hamlet in the west part of the town on Route 15.
- Stebbins Corners – A location at the eastern town line at the Route 18 and 25 junction.
- Wait Corners – A location in the eastern part of the town at Bailey Hill and Wait Corners Roads.

== Notable people ==
- Jay LaDue member of the New York Senate
- Jerome B. Miller, member of the Wisconsin State Assembly.
