= Mina, New York =

- Town
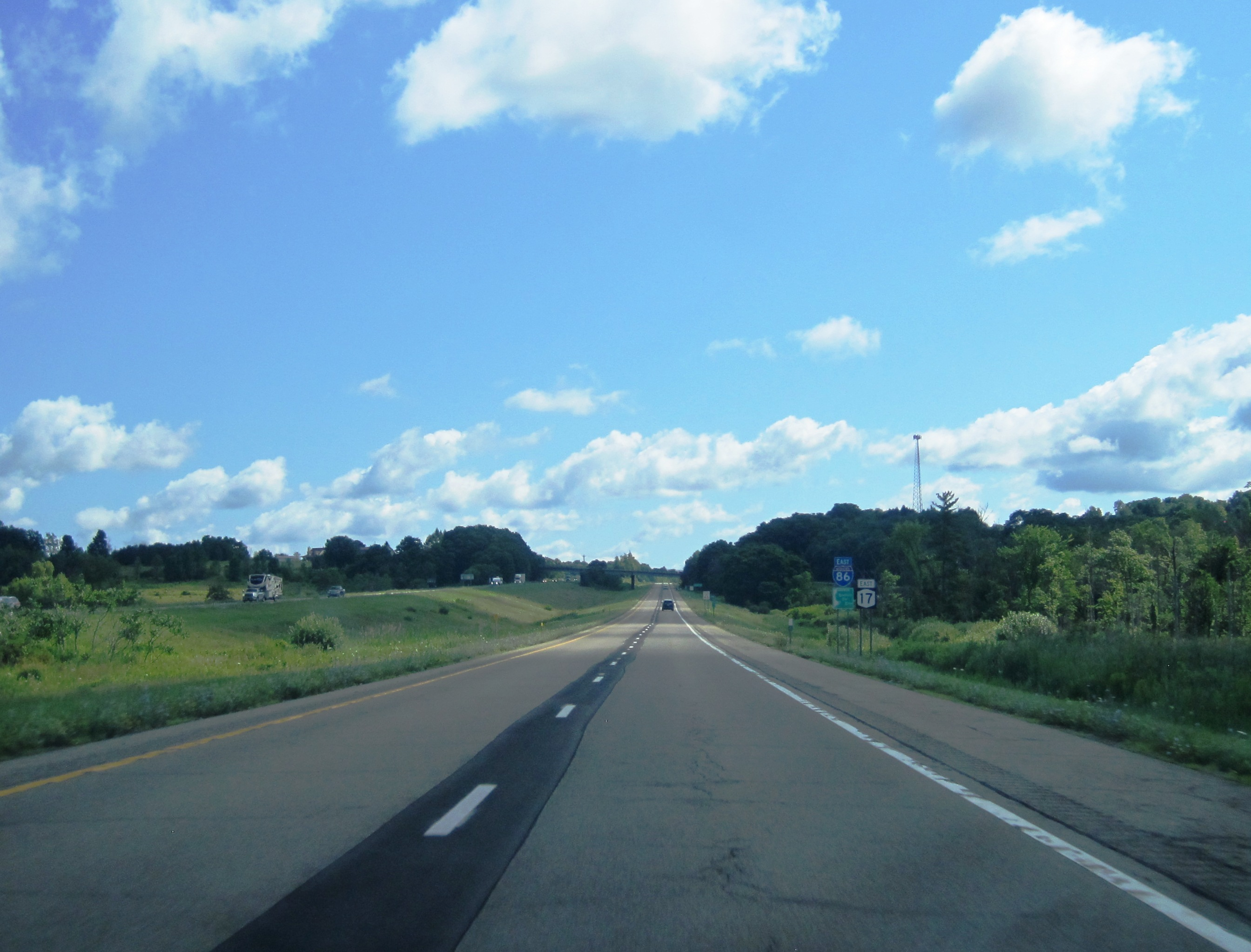
- Scenery in Mina along eastbound Interstate 86
- Motto: "The western gateway to New York State"
- Location within Chautauqua County and New York state

- Location within New York Location within the United States
- Coordinates: 42°7′56″N 79°42′19″W
- Country: United States
- State: New York
- County: Chautauqua

Government
  - Type: Town Council
  - Town Supervisor: Rebecca N. Brumagin (D)
  - Town Council: Members' List: • Scott Bensink (R); • David T. Wilcox (R); • Denis R. Cooper (R); • Dennis M. Luce (R)

Area
  - Total: 36.33 sq mi (94.09 km^{2})
  - Land: 35.82 sq mi (92.77 km^{2})
  - Water: 0.51 sq mi (1.32 km^{2})
- Elevation: 1,634 ft (498 m)

Population (2020)
  - Total: 1,004
  - Estimate (2021): 994
  - Density: 29.9/sq mi (11.56/km^{2})
- Time zone: UTC-5 (Eastern (EST))
  - Summer (DST): UTC-4 (EDT)
- ZIP Codes: 14736 (Findley Lake); 14724 (Clymer); 14781 (Sherman); 14775 (Ripley)
- FIPS code: 36-013-47592
- GNIS feature ID: 0979222
- Website: www.townofmina.info

Mina is a town in Chautauqua County, New York, United States. The population was 1,004 at the 2020 census. It is at the western county border and state line. The town is best known as a summer resort area, centered on the hamlet of Findley Lake.

== History ==
The area was first settled around 1815 by Alexander Findley, who built the first mills. The town of Mina was formed in 1824 from a partition of the town of Clymer. In 1832, part of the town was used to form the town of Sherman.

In 1915, the population of Mina was 1,021.

== Geography ==
According to the United States Census Bureau, the town has a total area of 36.3 square miles (94.1 km^{2}), of which 35.8 square miles (92.8 km^{2}) is land and 0.50 square miles (1.3 km^{2}), or 1.41%, is water.

Interstate 86 passes through the north part of the town, with access from exit 4. New York State Route 426 and New York State Route 430 intersect at Findley Lake.

=== Adjacent towns and areas ===
Mina is bordered by the townships of North East and Greenfield in Erie County, Pennsylvania, at its western town line. The town of Ripley is to the north, and the town of French Creek is to the south. The town of Sherman is to the east.

== Demographics ==
Historical population
Census	Pop.	Note	%±
1830	1,388		—
1840	871		−37.2%
1850	996		14.4%
1860	1,200		20.5%
1870	1,092		−9.0%
1880	1,102		0.9%
1890	1,125		2.1%
1900	1,038		−7.7%
1910	1,033		−0.5%
1920	903		−12.6%
1930	944		4.5%
1940	818		−13.3%
1950	1,012		23.7%
1960	1,188		17.4%
1970	1,129		−5.0%
1980	1,245		10.3%
1990	1,129		−9.3%
2000	1,176		4.2%
2010	1,106		−6.0%
2020	1,004		−9.2%
2021 (est.)	994		−1.0%
U.S. Decennial Census

As of the census of 2000, there were 1,176 people, 456 households, and 336 families residing in the town. The population density was 32.8 inhabitants per square mile (12.7/km^{2}). There were 750 housing units at an average density of 20.9 per square mile (8.1/km^{2}). The racial makeup of the town was 98.1% White, 0.3% African American, 0.3% Native American, 0.2% Asian, 0.3% from other races, and 0.9% from two or more races. Hispanic or Latino of any race were 0.9% of the population.

There were 456 households, out of which 28.3% had children under the age of 18 living with them, 64.7% were married couples living together, 3.5% had a female householder with no husband present, and 26.3% were non-families. 23.7% of all households were made up of individuals, and 10.1% had someone living alone who was 65 years of age or older. The average household size was 2.58 and the average family size was 2.99.

In the town, the population was spread out, with 24.7% under the age of 18, 6.0% from 18 to 24, 28.1% from 25 to 44, 26.4% from 45 to 64, and 14.6% who were 65 years of age or older. The median age was 40 years. For every 100 females, there were 100.7 males. For every 100 females age 18 and over, there were 103.0 males.

The median income for a household in the town was $40,139, and the median income for a family was $45,074. Males had a median income of $32,391 versus $22,404 for females. The per capita income for the town was $18,240. About 6.8% of families and 9.3% of the population were below the poverty line, including 15.4% of those under age 18 and 7.3% of those age 65 or over.

== Notable people ==
- Julian Buesink, car owner and crew chief of Bill Rexford's 1950 NASCAR Grand National Series championship run; lived in Findley Lake
- Alva J. Brasted, 4th Chief of Chaplains of the United States Army, born in Findley Lake
- Jehuu Caulcrick, NFL fullback, grew up Findley Lake
- Lloyd Moore, NASCAR Grand National Series driver
- Ebenezer Skellie, Medal of Honor recipient
- Amos Madden Thayer, federal judge

== Communities and locations in Mina ==
- Findley Lake – A lake in the southwest part of the town. Water from the lake drains to the north into the West Branch of French Creek, part of the Allegheny River watershed.
- Findley Lake – A hamlet named after the lake and the location of many summer homes. The village is at the north end of the lake by the junction of NY-426 and NY-430.
- Marks Corners – A location in the southeast corner of the town.
- Mina – The hamlet of Mina, located on NY Route 430 in the eastern part of the town.
