= Chautauqua, New York =

Town in New York, United States

- Town
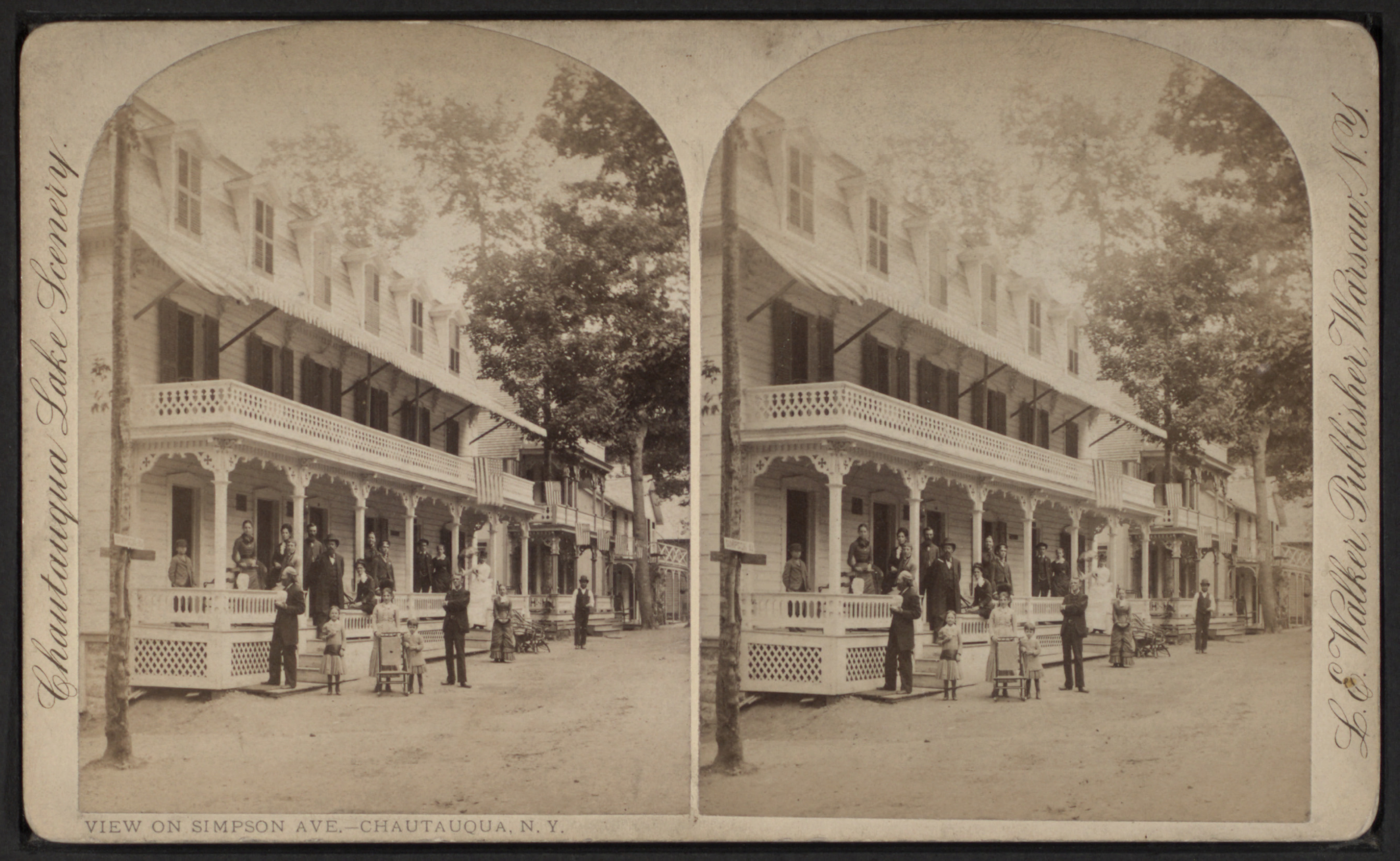
- Stereoscopic view of Simpson Avenue

- Location in Chautauqua County and New York state

- Location within New York Location within the United States
- Coordinates: 42°13′34″N 79°29′2″W
- Country: United States
- State: New York
- County: Chautauqua

Government
  - Type: Town council
  - Town supervisor: Donald D. Emhardt (D)
  - Town council: Members' list: • Kenneth W. Burnett (D); • David P. Ward (); • Thomas J. Carlson (); • James V. Kurtz (R)

Area
  - Total: 67.49 sq mi (174.80 km^{2})
  - Land: 67.40 sq mi (174.56 km^{2})
  - Water: 0.093 sq mi (.24 km^{2})
- Elevation: 1,342 ft (409 m)

Population (2020)
  - Total: 4,009
  - Estimate (2022): 4,014
  - Density: 59.48/sq mi (22.97/km^{2})
- Time zone: UTC-5 (Eastern (EST))
  - Summer (DST): UTC-4 (EDT)
- ZIP Codes: 14722 (Chautauqua); 14728 (Dewittville); 14757 (Mayville); 14781 (Sherman); 14784 (Stockton); 14787 (Westfield)
- Area code(s): 716, 624
- FIPS code: 36-013-14069
- GNIS feature ID: 0978815
- Website: www.townofchautauqua.gov

Chautauqua (/ʃəˈtɔːkwə/ shə-TAW-kwə) is a town and lake resort community in Chautauqua County, New York. The population was 4,009 at the 2020 census. The town is named after Chautauqua Lake. It is the home of the Chautauqua Institution and the birthplace of the Chautauqua movement.

== History ==
=== 19th century ===
Chautauqua was formed on April 11, 1805, from the town of Batavia, while still part of Genesee County. The first settler arrived the year before, near the current village of Mayville. When Chautauqua County was created on March 11, 1808, the town's territory was increased to include the eastern tier of townships, so that the town and the new county were coextensive. The town is the "mother of towns" in Chautauqua County since all other towns in the county towns were once part of it. The town is still one of the largest in the county.

The meaning of the name Chautauqua remains unknown and a source of speculation, with two longstanding folk translations being “bag tied in the middle” and “place where fish are taken out,” the latter having some support based on similar words in other Iroquoian languages. In Seneca it is known as Dza’dáhgwëh.

=== 20th century ===
In the years of the Chautauqua Institution's heyday, rail transport was the chief means by which long distance travelers accessed the town. To 1926, the Chautauqua Traction interurban operated several interurbans a day from Chautauqua to Mayville, and then to Westfield; to the opposite direction the interurban went to Lakewood and Jamestown. To the latter 1940s, Pennsylvania Railroad offered service at nearby Mayville, on a Pittsburgh-Buffalo route. From prior to the interurbans to the waning years of interurbans, steamboats provided access to different parts of the lake from Mayville and Jamestown.

The Lewis Miller Cottage of the Chautauqua Institution was listed in the National Register of Historic Places and as a National Historic Landmark in 1966. The Chautauqua Institution Historic District was listed in 1974.

== Geography ==
According to the U.S. Census Bureau, the town has a total area of 67.2 square miles (174.0 km^{2}), of which 67.1 square miles (173.8 km^{2}) is land and 0.077 square miles (0.2 km^{2}), or 0.14%, is water.

== Demographics ==
Historical population
Census	Pop.	Note	%±
1820	2,518		—
1830	2,432		−3.4%
1840	2,980		22.5%
1850	2,622		−12.0%
1860	2,837		8.2%
1870	3,064		8.0%
1880	3,570		16.5%
1890	3,259		−8.7%
1900	3,590		10.2%
1910	3,515		−2.1%
1920	3,533		0.5%
1930	3,802		7.6%
1940	3,819		0.4%
1950	4,222		10.6%
1960	4,376		3.6%
1970	4,341		−0.8%
1980	4,728		8.9%
1990	4,554		−3.7%
2000	4,666		2.5%
2010	4,464		−4.3%
2020	4,009		−10.2%
2022 (est.)	4,014	▲	0.1%
U.S. Decennial Census

As of the census of 2000, there were 4,666 people, 1,881 households, and 1,269 families residing in the town. The population density was 69.4 inhabitants per square mile (26.8/km^{2}). There were 4,174 housing units at an average density of 62.1 per square mile (24.0/km^{2}). The racial makeup of the town was 96.3% White, 1.6% African American, 0.2% Native American, 0.4% Asian, 0.1% Pacific Islander, 0.2% from other races, and 1.3% from two or more races. Hispanic or Latino of any race were 1.1% of the population.

There were 1,881 households, out of which 27.1% had children under the age of 18 living with them, 56.7% were married couples living together, 7.0% had a female householder with no husband present, and 32.5% were non-families. 28.3% of all households were made up of individuals, and 12.8% had someone living alone who was 65 years of age or older. The average household size was 2.35 and the average family size was 2.87.

In the town, the population was spread out, with 22.4% under the age of 18, 7.3% from 18 to 24, 25.4% from 25 to 44, 26.9% from 45 to 64, and 18.0% who were 65 years of age or older. The median age was 41 years. For every 100 females, there were 105.2 males. For every 100 females age 18 and over, there were 104.2 males.

The median income for a household in the town was $36,379, and the median income for a family was $41,923. Males had a median income of $30,767 versus $23,561 for females. The per capita income for the town was $19,003. About 7.5% of families and 12.0% of the population were below the poverty line, including 17.3% of those under age 18 and 5.3% of those age 65 or over.

== Transportation ==
New York State Route 394 and New York State Route 430, which intersect in Mayville, are the two primary roads in the town. Route 394 comes from Jamestown on the western side of the lake and continues on to Westfield. Route 430 comes from Jamestown on the eastern side of the lake and goes southwest from Mayville to the state line west of Findley Lake, where it becomes Pennsylvania Route 430.

== Places ==
- Chautauqua — The hamlet (and census-designated place) of Chautauqua, located on the west shore of Chautauqua Lake and location of the Chautauqua Institution on Route 394
- Chautauqua Creek — A stream forming most of the town's boundary with Westfield
- Chautauqua Institution — a nonprofit education center and summer resort located on Route 394
- Chautauqua post pffice — United States Postal Service facility located on Bestor Plaza inside the gates of Chautauqua Institution
- Cottage Park — A lakeside hamlet south of Mayville on Route 394
- Dart Airfield (D79) — A grass runway airfield east of Mayville
- Dean — A hamlet in the northeast corner of the town on County Road 37
- Dewittville — A lakeside hamlet on the east side of the lake on County Road 52
- Dewittville Bay — A bay near Point Chautauqua
- Hartfield — A hamlet in the northeast part of the town
- Hartfield Bay — A bay at the north end of Chautauqua Lake
- Irwins Bay — A small bay between Lighthouse Point and Wahmeda
- Lakeside Park — A small lakeside community south of Mayville
- Lighthouse Point — A hamlet at a projection into the lake south of Mayville on Route 394
- Magnolia — A lakeside hamlet in the southeast corner of the town on Chautauqua Lake on Route 394.
- Mayville — The village of Mayville is the county seat and is located on the northern end of Chautauqua Lake
- Orchard Terrace — A lakeside community south of Chautauqua on Route 394
- Pleasantville — A hamlet near the east town line on County Road 54
- Point Chautauqua — A hamlet on a peninsula on the eastern side of the lake
- Point Pleasant — A projection into Chautauqua Lake south of Mayville
- Prendergast Point — A projection into Lake Chautauqua in the southeast corner of the town
- Shorelands — A hamlet on the east side of Chautauqua Lake, east of Mayville on Route 430
- Summerdale — A hamlet in the western part of the town on NY Route 430
- Wahmeda — A lakeside hamlet north of Chautauqua on Route 394.
- Wooglin — A lakeside hamlet on the east side of the lake on Route 430

== Notable people ==
- Arthur Bestor, historian, public education critic
- John Jachym, businessman, philanthropist, sportsman
- Michael John LaChiusa, musical theater composer
- Hiram L. Richmond, former U.S. Congressman from Pennsylvania
- Gar Samuelson, original drummer of Megadeth (classic line-up)
- Glenni W. Scofield, U.S. Congressman from Pennsylvania
- Garnet Sixsmith, one of the first professional ice hockey players
- Heidi VanDerveer, women's basketball coach, Sacramento Monarchs

== See also ==
- National Register of Historic Places listings in Chautauqua County, New York
