= Bemus Point, New York =

- Village
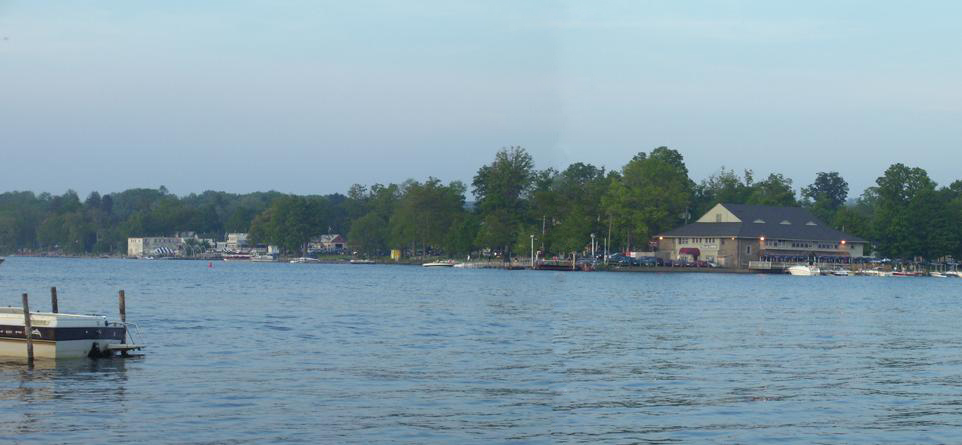
- From right to left: Village Casino, Stow Ferry landing, The Fish Restaurant
- Motto: Meet Us in the Middle
- Location within the state of New York
- Coordinates: 42°9′46″N 79°23′28″W
- Country: United States
- State: New York
- County: Chautauqua
- Town: Ellery
- Established: colonized 1806, incorporated 1911

Government
  - Mayor: Jeffrey Molnar (R)

Area
  - Total: 0.42 sq mi (1.09 km^{2})
  - Land: 0.42 sq mi (1.09 km^{2})
  - Water: 0 sq mi (0.00 km^{2})
- Elevation: 1,322 ft (403 m)

Population (2020)
  - Total: 306
  - Density: 729.7/sq mi (281.72/km^{2})
- Time zone: UTC-5 (Eastern (EST))
  - Summer (DST): UTC-4 (EDT)
- ZIP code: 14712
- Area code: 716
- FIPS code: 36-05848
- GNIS feature ID: 0943649
- Website: bemuspointny.org

Bemus Point is a village in Chautauqua County, New York, United States. The village is within the town of Ellery and is located along the eastern shore of Chautauqua Lake. The population was 312 at the 2020 census.

== Geography ==
Bemus Point is located along the southwestern edge of the town of Ellery, on the eastern shore of Chautauqua Lake at 42°9′46″N 79°23′28″W (42.162886, -79.391230). The village is immediately north of the location where Interstate 86 crosses Chautauqua Lake. Access to the village is from exits 9 and 10.

According to the United States Census Bureau, the village has a total area of 0.44 square miles (1.13 km^{2}), all land.

== History ==
The area currently known as Bemus Point was once part of the territory of the Erielhonan or Erie People Indigenous tribe, first colonized by William Bemus in 1806. Bemus had purchased land on both sides of Chautauqua Lake from the Holland Land Company in 1805 for $1.50. He moved his family to the east side of the lake (in the area now known as Bemus Point) on March 9, 1806. The Bemus family lived in a log cabin approximately 500 to 660 feet (150 to 200 m) northeast of the current ferry landing site. Bemus descendants still reside on original family property along Lakeside Drive north of Bemus Street.

The village of Bemus Point was incorporated in 1911.

A ferry connecting Bemus Point and Stow was founded in 1811 by Thomas Bemus. The original ferry was a raft built by Thomas and had to be poled across the lake. Today, a cable-drawn ferry exists in its place and is operated by the Sea Lion Project. Until the nearby bridge (now part of I-86) opened October 30, 1982, the Bemus-Stow Ferry was the only way to cross Chautauqua Lake. When closed for the winter months, motorists had to travel northwest to Mayville or southeast to Jamestown to reach Stow. Either way was a 19-mile (31 km) round trip. Residents often purchased a seasonal pass to use the ferry, commuting to Lakewood, Sherman, or other areas west of the lake.

Throughout the 1800s, Bemus Point gained popularity as a tourist destination, which promoted its growth and development. By the early 1900s, a dance hall known as the Village Casino, which still exists under the same name, became a well-known venue for entertainment, particularly big band music.

Bemus Point hosted the "Bemus Bay Pops" concert, which involved many local musicians, and was also host to the "Chautauqua Lake Voices", similar to American Idol.

The village volunteer fire department was chartered in 1920 and began its operations with a Model T fire truck. Today, the Bemus Point Volunteer Fire Department continues to serve the village's residents and the surrounding community.

Today, Bemus Point is still a popular summer tourist destination, with a large influx of summer visitors.

== Demographics ==
Historical population
| Census | Pop. | Note | %± |
|---|---|---|---|
| 1920 | 227 | | — |
| 1930 | 280 | | 23.3% |
| 1940 | 290 | | 3.6% |
| 1950 | 424 | | 46.2% |
| 1960 | 443 | | 4.5% |
| 1970 | 487 | | 9.9% |
| 1980 | 444 | | −8.8% |
| 1990 | 383 | | −13.7% |
| 2000 | 340 | | −11.2% |
| 2010 | 364 | | 7.1% |
| 2020 | 306 | | −15.9% |
| 2021 (est.) | 310 | ▲ | 1.3% |
U.S. Decennial Census

As of the census of 2000, there were 340 people, 170 households, and 95 families residing in the village. The population density was 850.0 inhabitants per square mile (328.2/km^{2}). There were 218 housing units at an average density of 545.0 per square mile (210.4/km^{2}). The racial makeup of the village was 97.65% White, 0.88% Native American, 0.59% Asian, 0.29% from other races, and 0.59% from two or more races. Hispanic or Latino of any race were 0.88% of the population.

There were 170 households, of which 18.8% had children under 18 living with them, 44.1% were married couples living together, 9.4% had a female householder with no husband present, and 44.1% were non-families. 38.8% of all households comprised individuals, and 24.7% had someone who was 65 or older living alone. The average household size was 2.00 and the average family size was 2.65.

The village's population was spread out, with 17.6% under 18, 4.7% from 18 to 24, 23.5% from 25 to 44, 26.5% from 45 to 64, and 27.6% who were 65 or older. The median age was 47 years. For every 100 females, there were 85.8 males. For every 100 females age 18 and over, there were 79.5 males.

The median income for a household in the village was $33,333, and the median income for a family was $46,250. Males had a median income of $37,708 versus $25,625 for females. The per capita income for the village was $19,943. About 3.9% of families and 7.6% of the population were below the poverty line, including 10.8% of those under age 18 and 9.5% of those age 65 or over.

As of the Census of 2010, there were 364 people (an increase of 24 people or 7.06%) and 170 households in the village. The population density was 910.0 inhabitants per square mile (351.4/km^{2}). The racial makeup of the village was 96.43% (351 people) white, 2.20% (8 people) Asian, 0.28% (1 person) other, and 1.10% (4 people) of two or more races. The Hispanic/Latino population of any race was 0.28% (1 person).

The population was spread out, with 19.23% (70 people) under the age of 18, 2.20% (8 people) ages 18 and 19, 3.02% (11 people) ages 20–24, 4.40% (16 people) ages 25–34, 19.78% (72 people) ages 35–49, 25.55% (93 people) ages 50–64, and 25.82% (94 people) over the age of 65. The male population comprised 46.43% (169 people) of the total population, and the female population comprised 53.57% of the total population.

== Education ==
=== Schools ===
The village is within the Bemus Point Central School District (BPCSD).

- Bemus Point Elementary School
- Maple Grove Junior Senior High School (MGHS)

== Community ==
Bemus Point has a 9-hole golf course, tennis courts, basketball courts, a park, and a free boat launch. The village's school district, Bemus Point Central School District, is home to the Red Dragons of Maple Grove High School, who have won two New York State football championships and three state championships in women's cross country (2010, 2011, 2012).

== Notable people ==
- Kevyn Adams, retired NHL player and current general manager of the Buffalo Sabres
- Bill Baldwin, science fiction writer
- Jorn Barger, notable blogger
- Bainbridge Colby, United States Secretary of State, maintained a home north of the village on what is now Sunset Bay Road, where he died in 1950
