= Chautauqua Lake =

Lake in New York

- Seneca: Dza’dáhgwëh
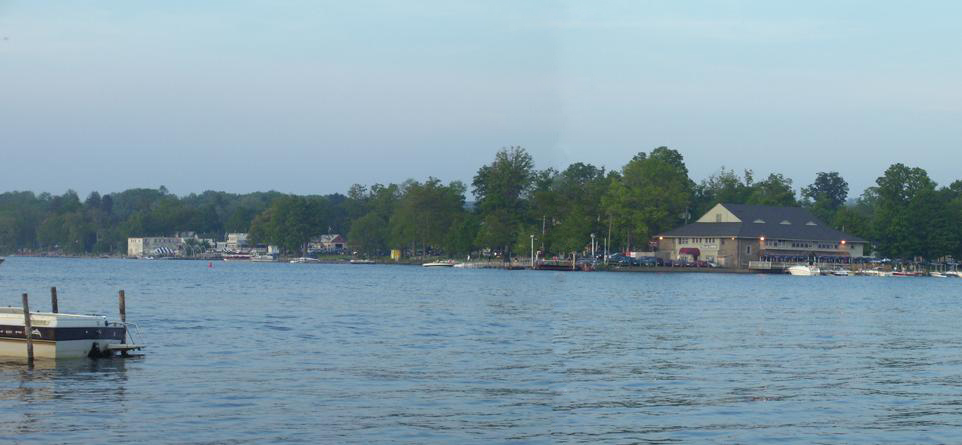
- View from Stow, New York, towards Bemus Point

- Location within New York Location within the United States
- Location: Chautauqua County, New York, United States
- Coordinates: 42°09′22″N 79°23′44″W
- Lake type: Natural
- Primary inflows: Big Inlet
- Primary outflows: Chadakoin River
- Catchment area: 180 sq mi (470 km^{2})
- Basin countries: United States
- Max. length: 17 mi (27 km)
- Max. width: 2 mi (3.2 km)
- Surface area: 13,000 acres (5,300 ha)
- Max. depth: 78 ft (24 m)
- Shore length^{1}: 41 mi (66 km)
- Surface elevation: 1,308 ft (399 m)
- Settlements: Jamestown
- ^{1} Shore length is not a well-defined measure.

Chautauqua Lake (Seneca: Dza’dáhgwëh) is located entirely within Chautauqua County, New York, United States. The lake is approximately 17 miles (27 km) long and two miles (3.2 km) wide at its greatest width. The surface area is approximately 13,000 acres (5,300 ha). The maximum depth is about 78 feet (24 m). The shoreline is about 41.1 miles (66 km) of which all but 2.6 mi (4 km) are privately owned.

The lake's name comes from the now-extinct Erie language. Because the Erie people were defeated in the Beaver Wars before a comprehensive study of their language could be made, its meaning remains unknown and a source of speculation, with two longstanding folk translations being "bag tied in the middle" and "place where fish are taken out," the latter having some support based on similar words in other Iroquoian languages. A Seneca legend, dating at least to the days of Seneca diplomat Cornplanter, attests to the Chautauqua having a reputation as a "place of easy death." In the Seneca language, the lake is known as Dza’dáhgwëh.

== Geography ==
While the lake has a similar geologic structure (a very long, narrow valley) to the Finger Lakes in the east, it is not considered one of the Finger Lakes. Chautauqua Lake runs perpendicular to the westernmost of those lakes (much like an opposable thumb), lies in a different watershed, and was likely formed by a different process.

Chautauqua Lake, at an elevation of 1,308 feet (399 m) above sea level, is higher than any of the Finger Lakes. It is also one of the highest navigable lakes in North America. The lake's water level is regulated by Warner Dam, with the water level lifted during the summer to allow for recreational boat use and lowered during the winter months.

Instead of flowing north into the Great Lakes, the water from Chautauqua Lake drains to the south, emptying first into the Chadakoin River in Jamestown, New York, before traveling east into Cassadaga Creek and Conewango Creek, south into the Allegheny River in Warren, Pennsylvania, and the Ohio River in Pittsburgh. Chautauqua Creek and Little Chautauqua Creek have their headwaters near the lake, but flow north into lake Erie. The drainage divide was spanned by Pierre-Joseph Céloron de Blainville in his 1749 Ohio River expedition that started from Montreal, and the town of Celoron at the southern end of the lake is named for him. The lake's drainage area is about 180 square miles (470 km^{2}).

Also at the southern end of the lake is the City of Jamestown while the Village of Mayville is located at the northern end. Other communities located on the lake are Bemus Point, Maple Springs, Lakewood and Chautauqua, the site of the influential Chautauqua Institution founded in 1874. There are many other settlements located on the lake, including Fluvanna, Greenhurst, Dewittville, Stow, and Ashville Bay.

=== Civil division ===
As of February 19, 2008, Chautauqua Lake has the unique distinction of being an unorganized territory within Chautauqua County. Unlike most large bodies of water in New York which are administratively divided up among the surrounding towns, villages, and cities, Chautauqua Lake is demarcated by the USGS and U.S. Census Bureau as a nonfunctioning political division of its own.

== Tourism and recreation ==
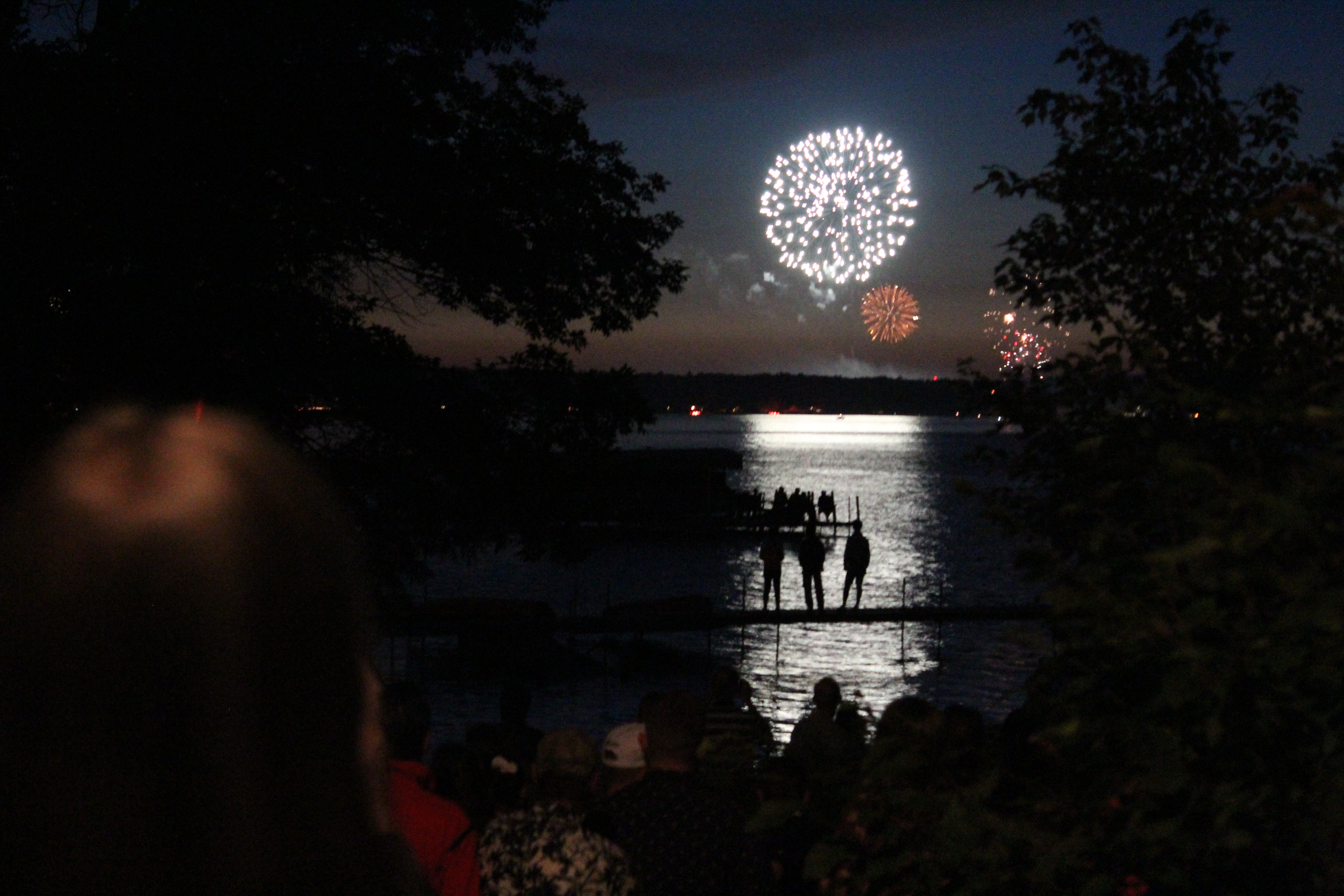
Fireworks above Chautauqua Lake on the Fourth of July

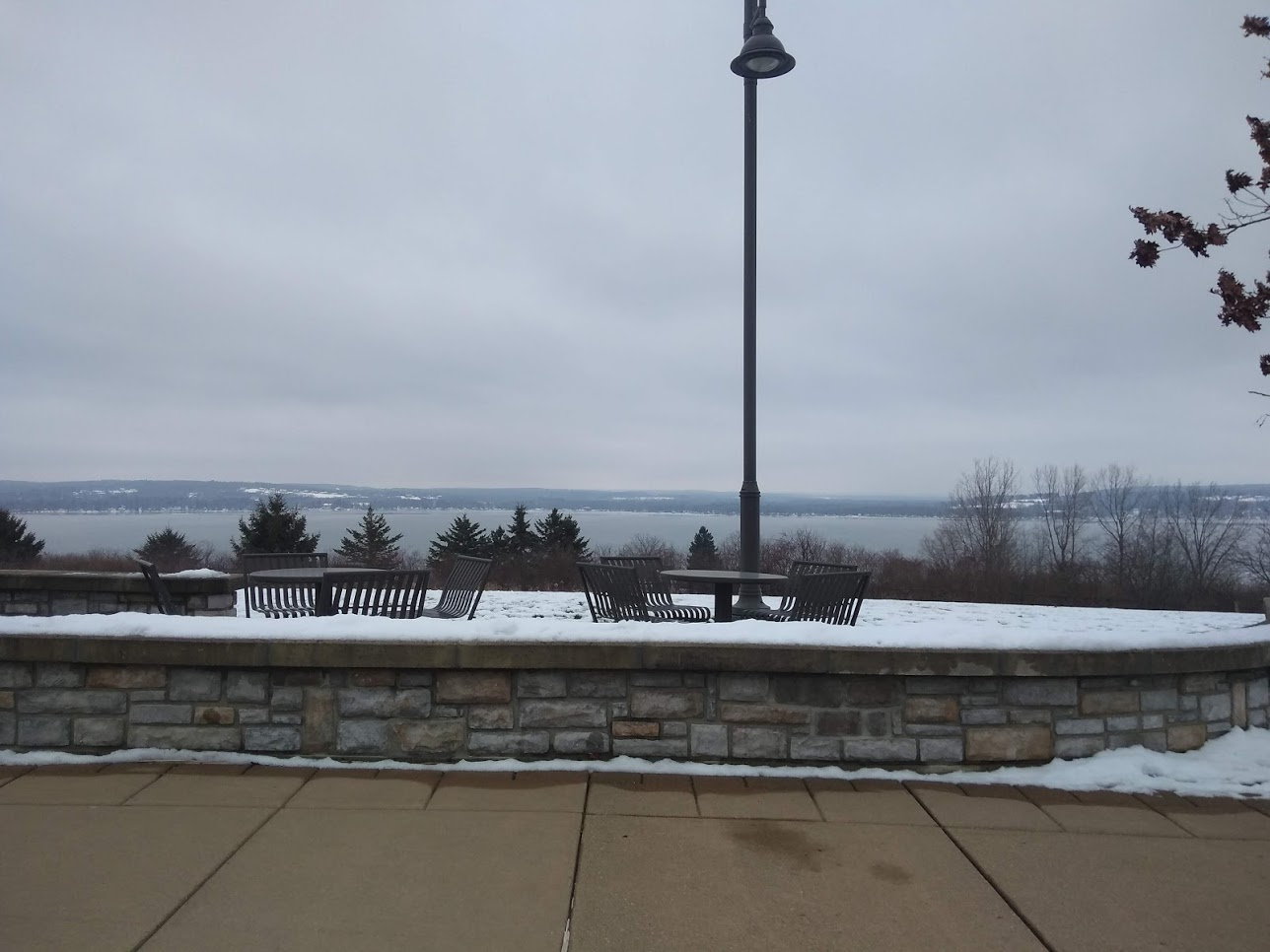
View from Bemus Point's Chautauqua Lake Rest Area

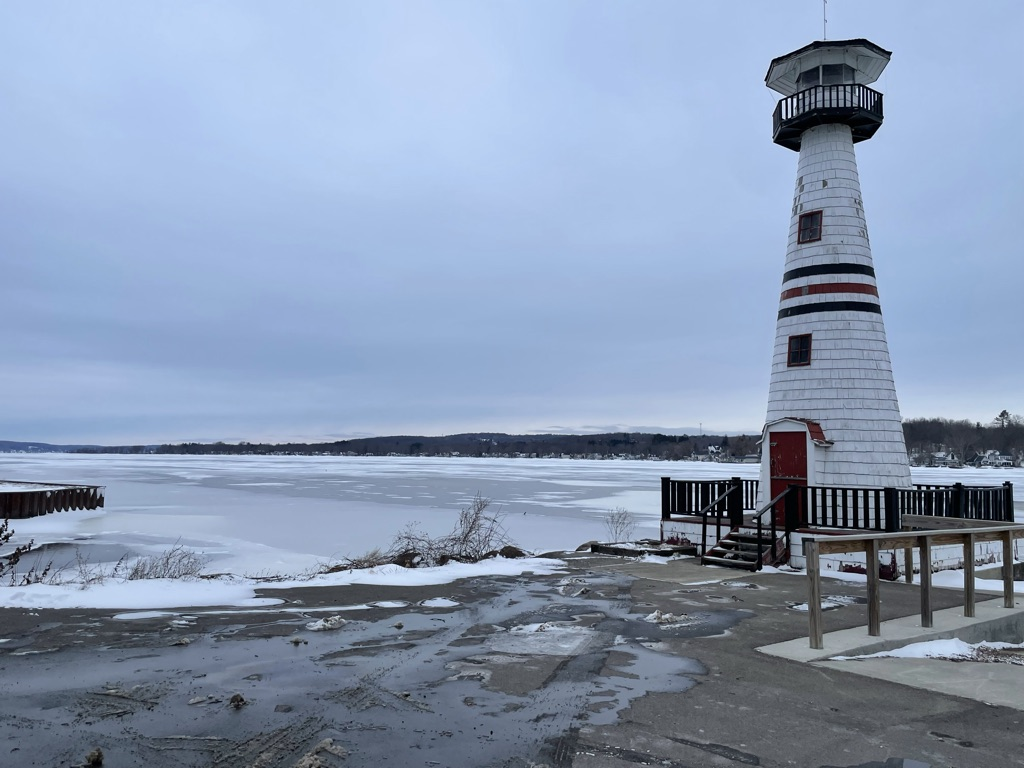
Chautauqua Lake typically freezes over in the winter. Image date: December 2022.

The lake is used primarily for recreation, such as boating and fishing, and tourism. The majority of tourists flock to the Chautauqua Institution, which contains a wide variety of stores and restaurants and is home to live music entertainment and many public lectures during the summer months. Chautauqua Lake is known for its muskellunge fishing and sailing. There are two very popular boating locations on the lake, "Sandy Bottoms" (aka "The Sand Bar") in the northernmost part of the lake, and "Party Bay," located to the east/southeast of Long Point State Park, near Maple Springs. On busy, warm weekends, it is not uncommon to see nearly 100 boats in this area of the lake. Every Fourth of July, fireworks are launched from communities around the lake.

There is one bridge that connects the opposite sides of the lake, the Veterans Memorial Bridge (also known as the Chautauqua Lake Bridge). The structure was completed on October 30, 1982, and joins Bemus Point to Stow on I-86 (at the time known as Route 17). Prior to the construction of the bridge, the only means for cars to cross the lake was the Bemus Point–Stow ferry, a nine-car cable guided ferry, which still operates during the summer months and has become more of a tourist attraction. The cost of the ferry ride is free, though donations are accepted, and it is operated by the Sea Lion Project Ltd.

The lake is the home of the Chautauqua Belle, a replica sternwheeler steamboat constructed in 1975 for the US Bicentennial, which offers sightseeing cruises on the lake.

The Village of Bemus Point has several popular attractions on the lake during the summer months. Prior to 2018, a popular tourist location was the Bemus Point restaurant, The Italian Fisherman, since renamed "The Fish." Prior to its change in name and ownership, the Italian Fisherman boasted a popular floating stage that hosted an annual summertime concert series. As of 2020 plans were underway to move the floating stage series to Mayville. Bemus Point offers The Village Casino, a restaurant and bar that can easily be reached by boat. Boaters are able to tie up at the Casino's dock where waitresses will serve them from their location. This establishment also has historical value in the area and offers nightlife on the lake. Contrary to its name, the Casino does not offer gambling.

From the late 1990s until September 2018, visitors could schedule a lake tour or dinner cruise on The Summer Wind, a large leisure boat that departed from Celoron at the southern end of the lake. The Summer Wind was damaged in a storm in 2019 and missed the 2020 tourist season. The Summer Wind was sold in late 2021 and moved out of Chautauqua County.

Two yacht clubs are located at the lake, Chautauqua Lake Yacht Club in Lakewood and Chautauqua Yacht Club in Chautauqua.

Chautauqua Lake supports a diverse sportfishery, with angling for walleye, muskellunge, largemouth bass, smallmouth bass and several species of panfish. Additional species include yellow perch, pumpkinseed, bluegill, black crappie, white crappie, white perch, white bass, brown bullhead, yellow bullhead, white sucker, common carp, rock bass, longnose gar and golden shiner.

== In popular culture ==
Chautauqua Lake is mentioned in at least one episode of I Love Lucy. Lucille Ball (a native of nearby Celoron, New York), playing the role of Lucy Ricardo, finds a stuffed and mounted fish in a trunk in her attic and recalls that Ricky caught it at Chautauqua Lake, and was so thrilled that he had mounted and kept it.

Chautauqua Lake is of major significance in the novel Wish You Were Here by Stewart O'Nan, published in 2002. The German translation of the title was Abschied von Chautauqua, which means "A Farewell from Chautauqua".

It is also the origin and namesake of the Chautauqua adult education movement, which was heavily referenced in the novel Zen and the Art of Motorcycle Maintenance by Robert M. Pirsig.

== See also ==
- Camp Onyahsa
