= Sherman (village), New York =

Sherman, New York
- Village
- Location within the state of New York
- Coordinates: 42°9′36″N 79°35′41″W
- Country: United States
- State: New York
- County: Chautauqua
- Town: Sherman
- Incorporated: 1890

Area
  - Total: 0.81 sq mi (2.10 km^{2})
  - Land: 0.81 sq mi (2.10 km^{2})
  - Water: 0 sq mi (0.00 km^{2})
- Elevation: 1,539 ft (469 m)

Population (2020)
  - Total: 649
  - Density: 799.1/sq mi (308.54/km^{2})
- Time zone: UTC-5 (Eastern (EST))
  - Summer (DST): UTC-4 (EDT)
- ZIP code: 14781
- Area code: 716
- FIPS code: 36-66949
- GNIS feature ID: 0965073
- Website: shermanny.org

Sherman is a village in the town of Sherman, Chautauqua County, New York, United States. The village lies in the northern part of the town at intersections of county routes 15 and 18, NY-76, and NY-430. The population was 681 at the 2020 census.

== History ==
The village of Sherman was incorporated in 1890. Sherman was named for Roger Sherman, a signer of the Declaration of Independence. The first settler was Dearing Dorman. A granite monument exists at the site of his original settlement on what is now known as Titus Road.

== Geography ==
According to the United States Census Bureau, the village has a total area of 0.85 square miles (2.2 km^{2}), all land.

Sherman is the westernmost incorporated village in New York.

== Demographics ==
Historical population
Census	Pop.	Note	%±
1870	610		—
1880	731		19.8%
1890	785		7.4%
1900	760		−3.2%
1910	836		10.0%
1920	847		1.3%
1930	769		−9.2%
1940	675		−12.2%
1950	861		27.6%
1960	873		1.4%
1970	769		−11.9%
1980	775		0.8%
1990	694		−10.5%
2000	714		2.9%
2010	730		2.2%
2020	681		−6.7%
2021 (est.)	677		−0.6%
U.S. Decennial Census

As of the census of 2000, there were 714 people, 287 households, and 198 families residing in the village. The population density was 860.4 inhabitants per square mile (332.2/km^{2}). There were 316 housing units at an average density of 380.8 per square mile (147.0/km^{2}). The racial makeup of the village was 97.90% White, 0.28% Native American, 0.42% Asian, and 1.40% from two or more races. Hispanic or Latino of any race were 0.42% of the population.

There were 287 households, out of which 34.1% had children under the age of 18 living with them, 53.0% were married couples living together, 12.2% had a female householder with no husband present, and 30.7% were non-families. 27.2% of all households were made up of individuals, and 16.0% had someone living alone who was 65 years of age or older. The average household size was 2.48 and the average family size was 2.99.

In the village, the population was spread out, with 26.6% under the age of 18, 9.4% from 18 to 24, 25.2% from 25 to 44, 24.4% from 45 to 64, and 14.4% who were 65 years of age or older. The median age was 37 years. For every 100 females, there were 93.5 males. For every 100 females age 18 and over, there were 88.5 males.

The median income for a household in the village was $30,583, and the median income for a family was $37,857. Males had a median income of $26,645 versus $20,833 for females. The per capita income for the village was $15,266. About 7.2% of families and 10.6% of the population were below the poverty line, including 14.7% of those under age 18 and 7.8% of those age 65 or over.

== Schools ==
Sherman has only one school, Sherman Central School, covering pre-school through grade 12. There are about 550 enrolled students in total, with an approximate graduating class of 40 students, and an attendance rate of 97%. The student ethnicity is 99% white/non-Hispanic, and 1% black/non-Hispanic. The average student-teacher ratio is 14:1, and the average years of experience for the teachers is 13 years.
