= The North East Breeze =

The North East Breeze was a newspaper founded in 1868 and serving North East, Pennsylvania and its environs. According to the 1984 header, the paper covered "North East, Greenfield, Ripley, Wattsburg, Venango, Findley Lake, and Harborcreek."

== Previous names ==
- 1868: The North East Herald
- 1868–1873: The North East Star
- 1873–1928: The North East Sun
