= Pennsylvania Route 89 =

State highway in Pennsylvania, US

Pennsylvania Route 89

Route information
- Maintained by PennDOT
- Length: 47.86 mi (77.02 km)
- Existed: 1928–present

Major junctions
- South end: PA 8 / PA 27 in Titusville
- US 6 near Elgin; I-86 in Greenfield Township; I-90 in North East Township; US 20 in North East
- North end: PA 5 near North East

Location
- Country: United States
- State: Pennsylvania
- Counties: Crawford, Erie

Highway system
- Pennsylvania State Route System; Interstate; US; State; Scenic; Legislative
| ← PA 88 | → I-90 |

Pennsylvania Route 89 (PA 89) is a 50-mile-long (80 km) north–south state highway located in northwestern Pennsylvania. The southern terminus of the route is at PA 8/PA 27 in Titusville. The northern terminus is at PA 5 north of North East.

== Route description ==
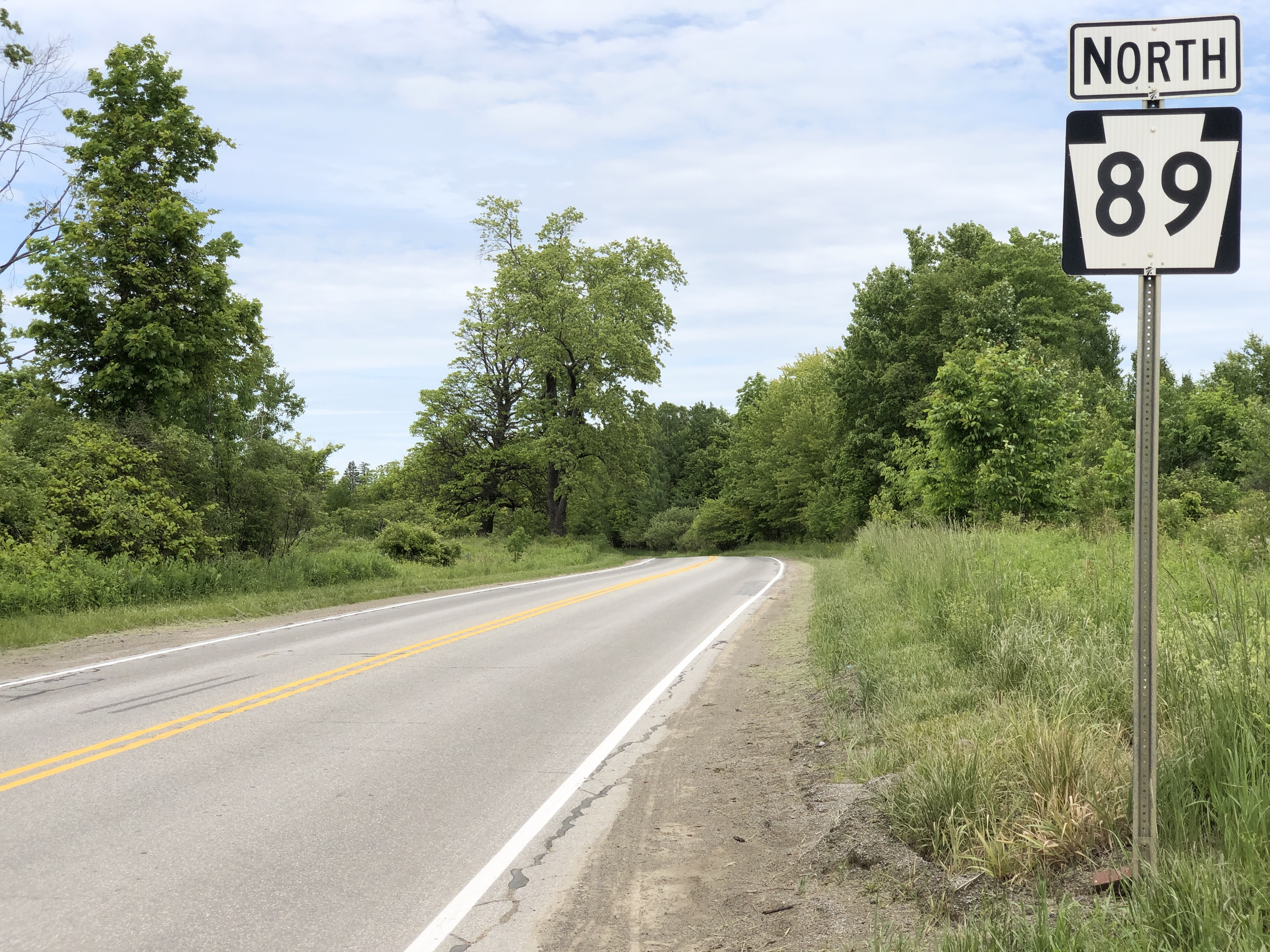
PA 89 northbound in Rome Township

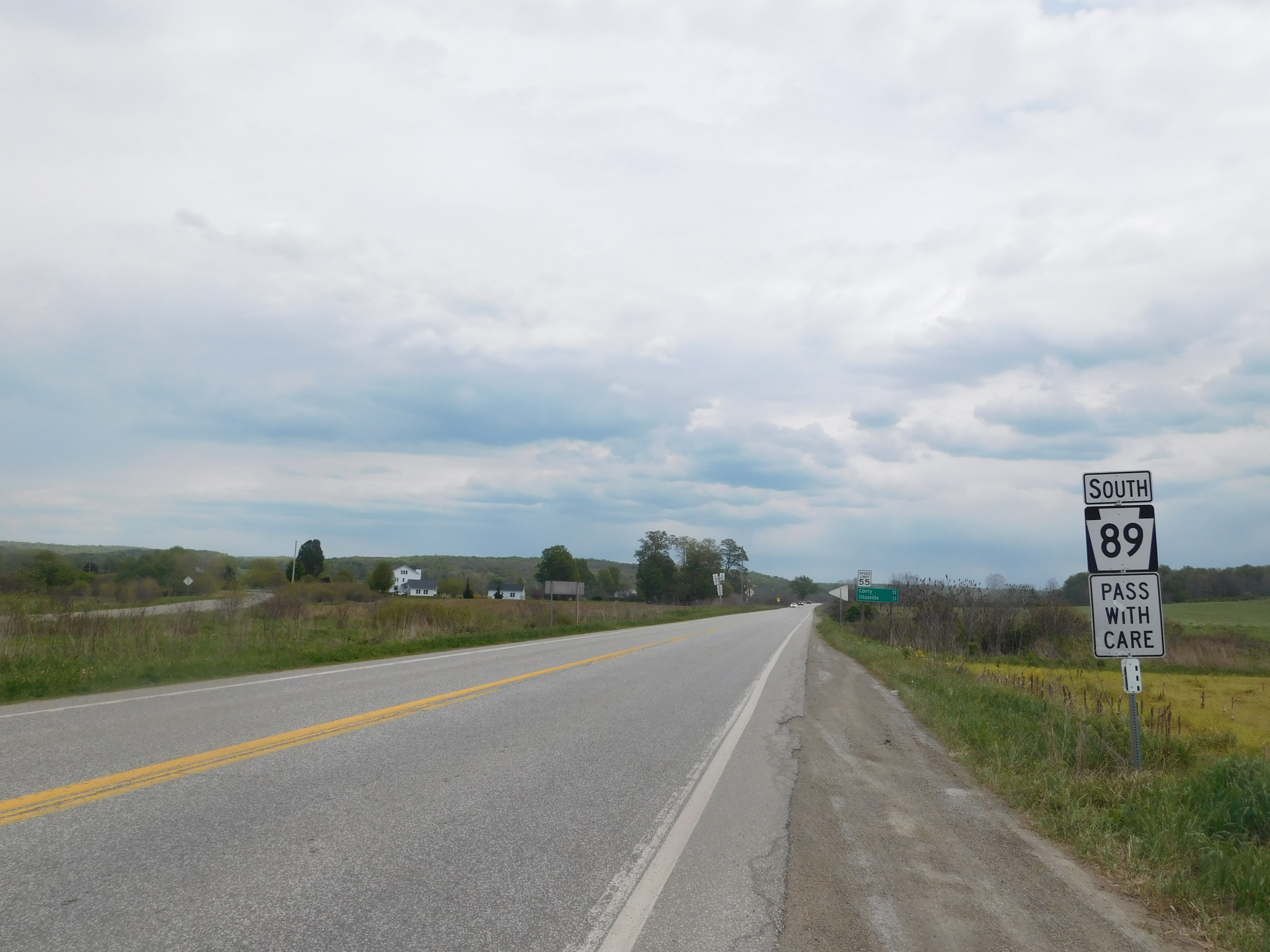
PA 89 south of Wattsburg, heading away from PA 8

PA 89 begins running north on Franklin Street in the city of Titusville just after the PA 8/PA 27 junction. PA 89 runs northeast out of the city before arcing back around to the north and passing through the community of Vrooman. The highway then bypasses Rome and Buells Corners to the east and then continues north through Hatchtown. West of the borough of Spartansburg, PA 89 forms a brief concurrency with PA 77. PA 89 then crosses over into Erie County.

PA 89 continues north to US 6, which it overlaps with from Lovell to the borough of Elgin. After splitting off to the north once again, the highway turns more northwest and meets Pennsylvania Route 8 south of the borough of Wattsburg. The two routes overlap through Wattsburg (where they meet the western terminus of PA 474) and split up in Lowville. At Colt Station, PA 89 crosses PA 430. North of the PA 430 junction, PA 89 has an interchange with Interstate 86 (exit 3). 4 miles (6 km) later, PA 89 has an interchange with Interstate 90 (exit 41). PA 89 then enters the borough of North East. There, it serves as the western terminus of PA 426 before crossing US 20. PA 89 then comes to an end at PA 5, near Lake Erie.

== History ==
PA 89 was established in 1928. In 1930, the highway ran from U.S. Route 6 in Beaver Dam to U.S. Route 20 in North East. By 1941, PA 89 was extended south to the current southern terminus at Titusville. The northern terminus was also extended to Pennsylvania Route 5 in North East.

== Major intersections ==
| County | Location | mi | km | Destinations | Notes |
|---|---|---|---|---|---|
| Crawford | Titusville | 0.00 | 0.00 | PA 8 / PA 27 (Central Avenue) | Southern terminus |
| Crawford | Sparta Township | 13.62 | 21.92 | PA 77 west – Blooming Valley, Meadville | Southern end of PA 77 concurrency |
| Crawford | Sparta Township | 14.77 | 23.77 | PA 77 east – Spartansburg | Northern end of PA 77 concurrency |
| Erie | Concord Township | 22.17 | 35.68 | US 6 east – Corry | Southern end of US 6 concurrency |
| Erie | Elgin | 23.75 | 38.22 | US 6 west – Meadville | Northern end of US 6 concurrency |
| Erie | Amity Township | 30.74 | 49.47 | PA 8 south (Main Street) | Southern end of PA 8 concurrency |
| Erie | Wattsburg | 31.24 | 50.28 | PA 474 east (Jamestown Street) – Clymer, Jamestown | Western terminus of PA 474 |
| Erie | Venango Township | 32.82 | 52.82 | PA 8 north – Erie | Northern end of PA 8 concurrency |
| Erie | Greenfield Township | 39.37 | 63.36 | PA 430 (Station Road) – Wesleyville, Findley Lake | |
| Erie | Greenfield Township | 40.71 | 65.52 | I-86 – Erie, Jamestown | Exit 3 on I-86; former PA 17 |
| Erie | North East Township | 44.29 | 71.28 | I-90 – Erie, Buffalo | Exit 41 on I-90 |
| Erie | North East | 45.97 | 73.98 | PA 426 south (Grahamville Street) | Northern terminus of PA 426 |
| Erie | North East | 46.45 | 74.75 | US 20 (Main Street) | |
| Erie | North East Township | 47.86 | 77.02 | PA 5 (Lake Road) – Erie, Buffalo | Northern terminus |
1.000 mi = 1.609 km; 1.000 km = 0.621 mi: Concurrency terminus
