= Seneca High School (Pennsylvania) =

High school in Wattsberg

Coordinates: 42.05679°N 79.90603°W

Seneca High School is a high school which serves the townships of Greene, Greenfield, Venango, and Amity in Erie County, Pennsylvania.

Also includes Wattsburg Area Middle School (WAMS) and Wattsburg Area Elementary Center (WAEC)
