= Wattsburg Area School District =

School District in Pennsylvania, United States

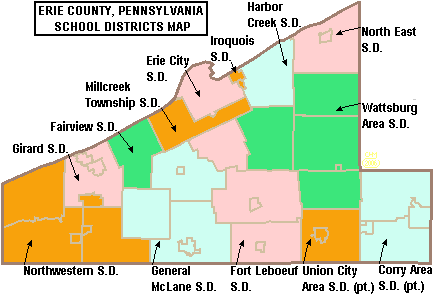

Address
- 10782 Wattsburg Road Erie, Pennsylvania, 16509; United States

District information
- Type: Public
- Grades: K–12
- NCES District ID: 4225080

Students and staff
- Students: 1,296
- Teachers: 101.57 (FTE)
- Staff: 130.43 (FTE)
- Student–teacher ratio: 12.76

Other information
- Website: www.wattsburg.org

The Wattsburg School District is a public school district serving parts of Erie County, Pennsylvania. Centered in Wattsburg, the townships of Amity, Venango, Greene, and Greenfield are also included in district boundaries. The district contains three schools: Wattsburg Area Elementary Center, Wattsburg Area Middle School, and Seneca High School.
