= Pennsylvania Route 474 =

State highway in Erie County, Pennsylvania, US

Pennsylvania Route 474

Route information
- Maintained by PennDOT
- Length: 3.200 mi (5.150 km)
- Existed: 1984–present

Major junctions
- West end: PA 8 / PA 89 in Wattsburg
- East end: NY 474 in Venango Township

Location
- Country: United States
- State: Pennsylvania
- Counties: Erie

Highway system
- Pennsylvania State Route System; Interstate; US; State; Scenic; Legislative
← PA 472	→ PA 475

Pennsylvania Route 474 (PA 474) (designated by the Pennsylvania Department of Transportation as SR 0474) is a short state highway in Venango Township, Erie County, Pennsylvania. The route begins at an intersection with PA 8 and PA 89 (which are concurrent) in the borough of Wattsburg, heading for 3.20 miles (5.15 km) into the rural parts of Venango Township before crossing the state line into New York, where it continues to Sherman, New York as New York State Route 474 (NY 474). The route in Pennsylvania was assigned in 1984 as a continuation of NY 474, which was designated in the early 1970s as a replacement to New York State Route 74.

The route itself began as the privately maintained and tolled Wattsburg and State Line Plank Road. The plank road was chartered on March 25, 1851, running from North Street in Wattsburg to the state line, where it would continue to Sherman. The plank road was set $6,250 (1851 USD) in shares to begin.

== Route description ==
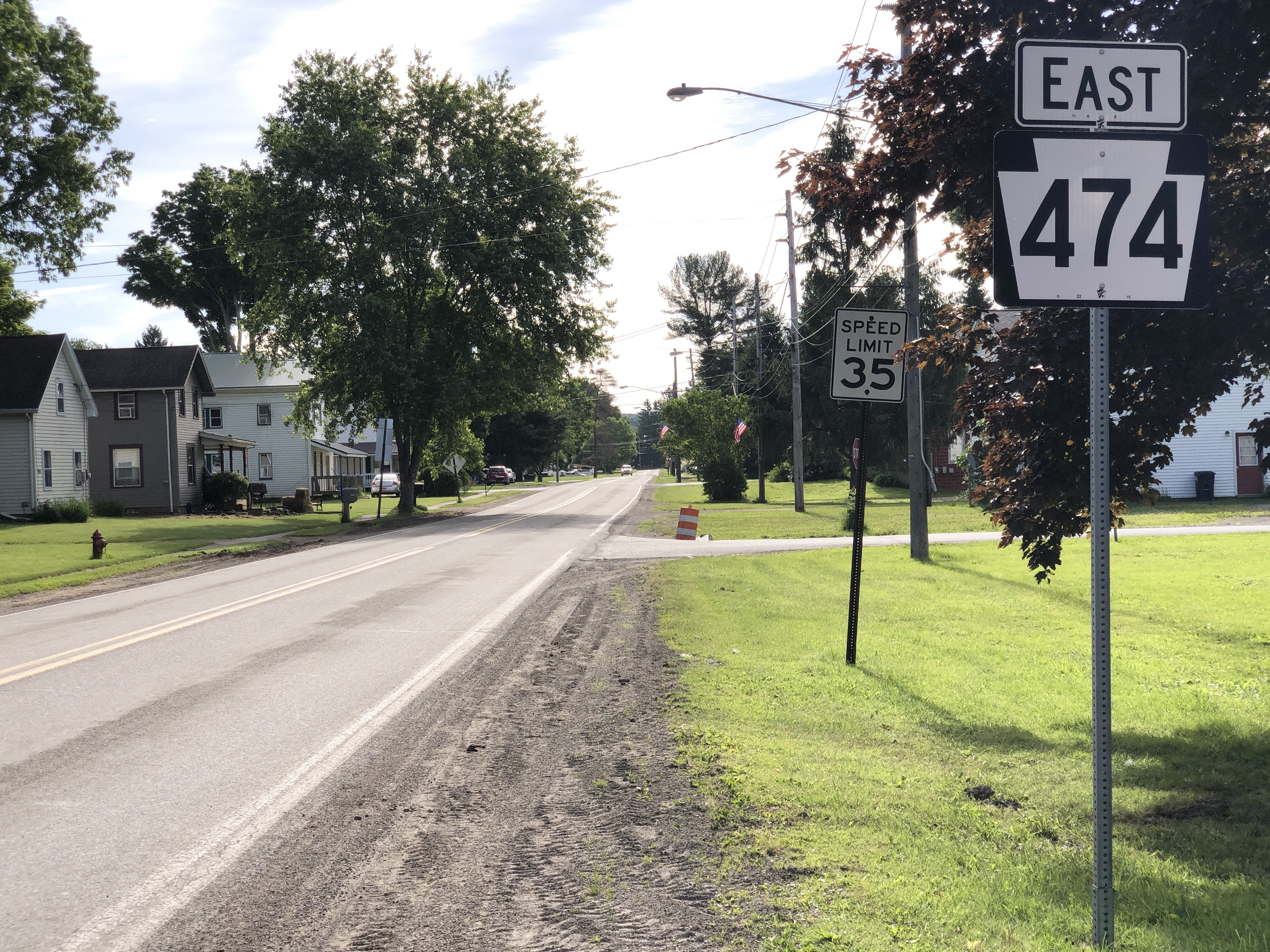
PA 474 eastbound past PA 8/PA 89 in Wattsburg

PA 474 begins at an intersection with PA 8 and PA 89 in the borough of Wattsburg. The route heads eastward along Jamestown Street in downtown Wattsburg, passing residential homes for several blocks. At the intersection with Raun Street, PA 474 intersects with the local roads serving the Wattsburg Cemetery in the community. At the intersection with the second cemetery street, the highway leaves the community of Wattsburg and turns to the northeast along Jamestown Road. PA 474 continues to the northeast in the farmlands in rural Erie County, passing small patches of woodlands for most of its length. The route progresses for a distance along this alignment until an intersection with Macedonia Road, where the route turns and begins to wind to the northeast.

PA 474 continues through Venango Township, turning eastward at a gradual bend in the local woodlands. The highway continues, entering a clear area soon after. After an intersection with Weeks Valley Road, PA 474 and the paralleling Tanner Road continue to the New York state line, where the highway continues as NY 474. Tanner Road intersects and terminates in New York soon after.

== History ==
PA 474 follows the alignment of the Wattsburg and State Line Plank Road. The plank road was first chartered on March 25, 1851, when the Pennsylvania State Legislature enacted eight commissioners to start the private highway. The charter detailed that the to-be-constructed plank road was assigned to head from the intersection with North Street in the community of Wattsburg to the New York state line, where it ended near the house of J.B. Foote, a local. Following the rules set in a legislation on January 26, 1851. The plank road company, called the Wattsburg and State Line Plank Road Company, was granted 250 shares of $25 company stock (a total of $6,520 in 1851 USD). They were also given a timetable for the construction of the new highway, that if the road was not completed between 1854 and 1858, the charter would be null and void and money would be necessary to repay the state and debts of the company. The plank road itself remained one of the several public roads in Erie County, and by 1884, was still serving its purpose.

PA 474 was assigned in 1984, when the Pennsylvania Department of Transportation used the plank road alignment to connect Wattsburg to NY 474, which was designated about a decade prior as a replacement to the original NY 74.

== Major intersections ==
The entire route is in Erie County.

Location	mi	km	Destinations	Notes
Wattsburg	0.000	0.000	PA 8 / PA 89 (Main Street) – Titusville, Erie	Western terminus
Venango Township	3.200	5.150	NY 474 east – Clymer, Jamestown	New York state line; eastern terminus
1.000 mi = 1.609 km; 1.000 km = 0.621 mi

== See also ==
- Pennsylvania Route 426
- Pennsylvania Route 430
