= New York State Route 474 =

State highway in Chautauqua County, New York, US

New York State Route 474
- Map of Chautauqua County with NY 474 highlighted in red

Route information
- Maintained by NYSDOT
- Length: 24.58 mi (39.56 km)
- History: Designated NY 74 in 1930; renumbered to NY 474 on July 1, 1972

Major junctions
- West end: PA 474 at the Pennsylvania state line in French Creek
- East end: NY 394 near Lakewood

Location
- Country: United States
- State: New York
- Counties: Chautauqua

Highway system
- New York Highways; Interstate; US; State; Reference; Parkways
← NY 470	→ I-478

New York State Route 474 (NY 474) is a state highway located entirely within Chautauqua County in the westernmost corner of New York in the United States. It begins at the section of the Pennsylvania state line that runs north–south and runs eastward, initially paralleling the state line before taking a more northeasterly alignment toward Chautauqua Lake. The route ends adjacent to the lake at a junction with NY 394 in the town of Busti. NY 474 was originally designated as New York State Route 74 in 1930 before being renumbered to NY 474 on July 1, 1972. The route continues westward into Pennsylvania as Pennsylvania Route 474 (PA 474), which was assigned in the 1980s.

== Route description ==
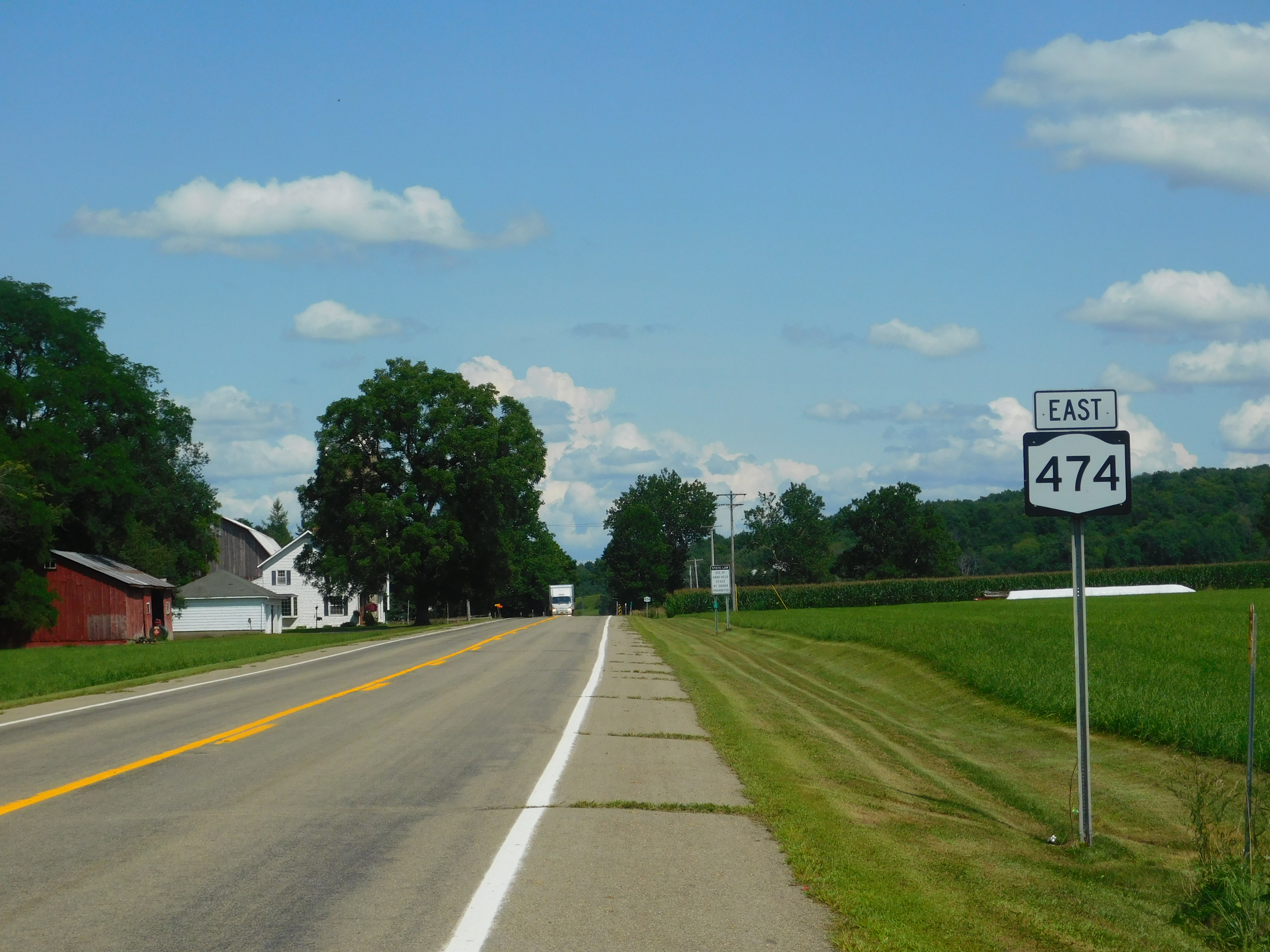
NY 474 eastbound from the state line in French Creek

NY 474 begins at the Pennsylvania state line in the town of French Creek as a continuation of PA 474, which in turn begins a short distance west of the state line in Wattsburg, Pennsylvania. NY 474 heads east through rural southwest Chautauqua County, briefly paralleling French Creek to the hamlet of Marvin before intersecting and briefly overlapping with NY 426 through the small hamlet of Cutting. NY 474 exits Cutting and continues on an easterly track into the town of Clymer and the hamlet of the same name, where it meets County Route 15 (CR 15), a local road leading from the Pennsylvania state line (where the road continues south to Corry) north to Sherman in the center of the community.

East of the hamlet of Clymer, NY 474 turns to the northeast, paralleling an old railroad bed to the community of North Clymer, where NY 474 intersects the southern terminus of NY 76. Outside of North Clymer, the route returns to an east–west alignment prior to entering the town of Harmony and the village of Panama (intersecting CR 33 in the latter) in quick succession. NY 474 continues on, passing through the Harmony hamlet of Blockville and the North Harmony community of Ashville before terminating at NY 394 just west of the Lakewood village limits in the town of Busti.

== History ==
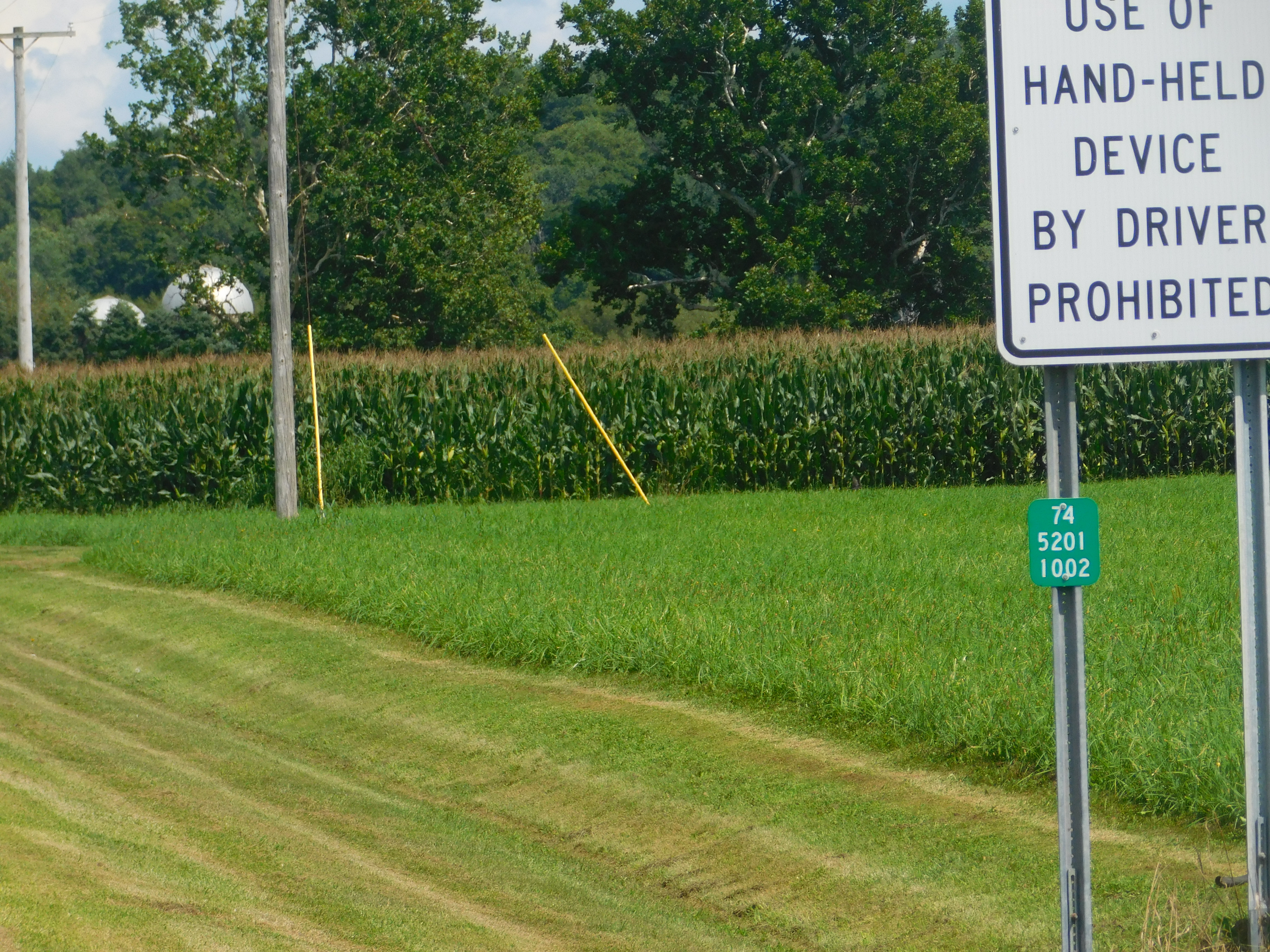
NY 74 reference markers on NY 474, referring to the former designation

All of what is now NY 474 was originally designated as part of NY 74 as part of the 1930 renumbering of state highways in New York. NY 74 also initially continued east from Lakewood to Jamestown by way of modern NY 394. The remainder of what is now NY 394 from Mayville south to Lakewood was designated as NY 17J. In the mid-1930s, NY 17J was extended eastward along NY 74 to rejoin NY 17 at Washington Street in Jamestown. The overlap was eliminated in the mid-1940s when NY 74 was truncated to Ashville. NY 74 remained unchanged until July 1, 1972 when it was renumbered to NY 474. The change in number allowed for the NY 74 designation to be used for the westward continuation of Vermont Route 74 in Essex County. The short continuation of NY 474 west to Wattsburg, Pennsylvania, was designated as PA 474 in the 1980s.

== Major intersections ==
The entire route is in Chautauqua County.

Location	mi	km	Destinations	Notes
French Creek	0.00	0.00	PA 474 west – Erie	Continuation into Pennsylvania
French Creek	3.62	5.83	NY 426 north – Findley Lake, Sherman	Hamlet of Cutting; western terminus of NY 426 / NY 474 overlap
French Creek	3.73	6.00	NY 426 south – Corry, Union City	Hamlet of Cutting; eastern terminus of NY 426 / NY 474 overlap
Clymer	12.55	20.20	NY 76 north – Sherman	Hamlet of North Clymer; southern terminus of NY 76
Busti	24.58	39.56	NY 394 – Jamestown, Mayville	Eastern terminus
1.000 mi = 1.609 km; 1.000 km = 0.621 mi: Concurrency terminus
