= New York State Route 76 =

State highway in Chautauqua County, New York, US

New York State Route 76
- Map of Chautauqua County in western New York with NY 76 highlighted in red

Route information
- Maintained by NYSDOT
- Length: 19.35 mi (31.14 km)
- Existed: 1930–present

Major junctions
- South end: NY 474 in Clymer
- I-86 / NY 17 in Sherman
- North end: NY 5 in Ripley

Location
- Country: United States
- State: New York
- Counties: Chautauqua

Highway system
- New York Highways; Interstate; US; State; Reference; Parkways
| ← NY 75 | → NY 77 |

New York State Route 76 (NY 76) is located entirely within Chautauqua County, New York, in the United States. It runs north–south from NY 474 in the hamlet of North Clymer in the town of Clymer at its southern end to NY 5 along the Lake Erie shoreline in the town of Ripley. It crosses both the Southern Tier Expressway (I-86/NY 17) and the New York State Thruway (I-90), although it does not connect to the latter.

== Route description ==
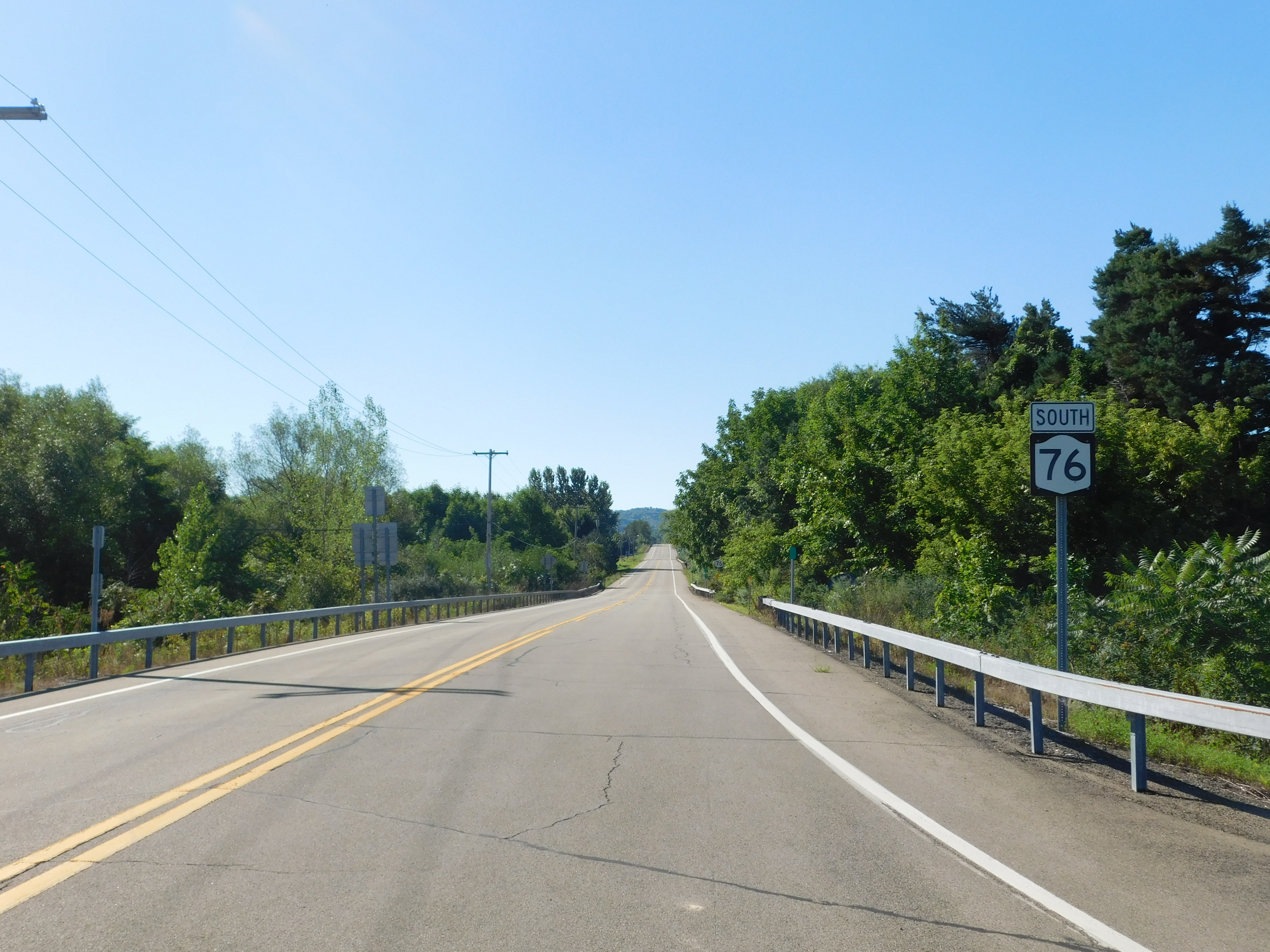
NY 76 southbound through the town of Ripley

NY 76 begins at a fork in the road with NY 474 in the hamlet of North Clymer within the town of Clymer. Intersecting with Church Street, a short connector between both roads, NY 76 bends to the north and out of North Clymer. The route soon bends to the northwest as a two-lane rural road, intersecting with the eastern terminus of County Route 4 (CR 4; Alder Bottom Road) after turning north into the town of Sherman. The route continues northward through the rural parts of Sherman, passing to the far east of Slab City, before turning northeastward and into the village of Sherman. During this northwestern bend, NY 76 enters interchange 6 of I-86 and NY 17 before entering the downtown portion of the village. In downtown Sherman, NY 76 gains the moniker of Osborne Street until the intersection with Mill Street, where it changes to Franklin Street. A short stint from the name change is all of Franklin Street, before NY 76 intersects with NY 430 (Main Street). The two routes head westward on a short concurrency, before NY 76 turns northwestward on Kipp Street, leaving the village of Sherman.

After leaving the village of Sherman for the namesake town, NY 76 changes names to Sherman-Ripley Road. A short distance later, the route crosses into the town of Westfield, forking west at an intersection with CR 21 (Sherman-Westfield Road) and CR 22 (Nettle Hill Road). The route bends southwestward, until the intersection with CR 6 (Northeast Sherman Road), where NY 76 turns northward as Sherman Road. The road remains rural, entering the town of Ripley and to the east of the hamlet of Wattlesburg. At the intersection with Noble Road, NY 76 bends westward once again, crossing to the north of Wattlesburg. Residences begin following the highway as the route begins to wind to the northwest through Ripley, becoming known as South State Street in the hamlet of Ripley. Passing to the southwest of Quincy Rural Cemetery, NY 76 crosses a former New York Central Railroad alignment before crossing an intersection with US 20 (Main Street) in Ripley. After this intersection, NY 76 becomes a major local thoroughfare, passing a long stretch of residences before crossing under I-90 and the New York State Thruway. After the crossing, NY 76 becomes a two-lane rural road before terminating at an intersection with NY 5 (Lake Road) in Ripley, just off the shore of Lake Erie.

== History ==
The entirety of NY 76 was assigned as part of the 1930 renumbering of state highways in New York. The bridge carrying NY 76 over the New York State Thruway in Ripley was built as part of the Thruway's construction in 1957.

== Major intersections ==
The entire route is in Chautauqua County.

| Location | mi | km | Destinations | Notes |
|---|---|---|---|---|
| Clymer | 0.00 | 0.00 | NY 474 – Jamestown, Clymer | Southern terminus; hamlet of North Clymer |
| Village of Sherman | 5.74 | 9.24 | I-86 / NY 17 – Erie, PA, Jamestown | Exit 6 on I-86 |
| Village of Sherman | 6.18 | 9.95 | NY 430 east (Main Street) | Southern end of NY 430 concurrency |
| Village of Sherman | 6.28 | 10.11 | NY 430 west (Main Street) | Northern end of NY 430 concurrency |
| Town of Ripley | 18.31 | 29.47 | US 20 (Main Street) | Hamlet of Ripley |
| Town of Ripley | 19.35 | 31.14 | NY 5 (Lake Road) – Erie, Buffalo | Northern terminus |
1.000 mi = 1.609 km; 1.000 km = 0.621 mi: Concurrency terminus
