= New York State Route 74 (disambiguation) =

New York State Route 74 is an east–west state highway in Essex County, New York, United States, that was established in the early 1970s.

New York State Route 74 may also refer to:

- New York State Route 74 (1920s–1930) in Wyoming, Genesee, and Orleans counties
- New York State Route 74 (1930–1973) in Chautauqua County
