= West Branch French Creek (French Creek tributary) =

Stream in Pennsylvania, USA

West Branch French Creek Tributary to French Creek
- Location of West Branch French Creek mouth West Branch French Creek (French Creek tributary) (the United States)

Location
- Country: United States
- States: Pennsylvania; New York
- Counties: Erie; Chautauqua

Physical characteristics
- Source: divide between West Branch French Creek and French Creek
  - location: about 1 mile northeast of Mina, New York
  - coordinates: 42°08′25″N 079°40′17″W
  - elevation: 1,610 ft (490 m)
- Mouth: French Creek
  - location: Wattsburg, Pennsylvania
  - coordinates: 41°59′56″N 079°48′47″W
  - elevation: 1,273 ft (388 m)
- Length: 28.69 mi (46.17 km)
- Basin size: 77.89 square miles (201.7 km^{2})
- Discharge
  - location: French Creek
  - average: 180.76 cu ft/s (5.119 m^{3}/s) at mouth with French Creek

Basin features
- Progression: French Creek → Allegheny River → Ohio River → Mississippi River → Gulf of Mexico
- River system: Allegheny River
- Tributaries
  - left: Darrow Brook; Bailey Brook
  - right: Townley Run; Alder Brook
- Bridges: I-86, Hazen Road, North Road, Findley Lake Road, Greenman Road, I-86, Station Road, Ashton Road, NY 89, Wildman Road, Knoyle Road, Jones Road, PA 89,

West Branch French Creek is a 28.69 mi (46.17 km) long tributary to French Creek that rises in Chautauqua County, New York and flows into Erie County, Pennsylvania. It is classed as a 2nd order stream on the EPA waters geoviewer site.

== Course ==
West Branch French Creek rises in the Town of Mina, New York in western Chautauqua County and flows southwest into Erie County, Pennsylvania and then turns south towards Wattsburg, Pennsylvania.

== Watershed ==
West Branch French Creek drains 77.89 square miles (201.7 km^{2}) of Erie Drift Plain (glacial geology). The watershed receives an average of 46.8 in/year of precipitation and has a wetness index of 474.55. The watershed is about 44% forested.

=== Tributaries ===
Tributaries to West Branch French Creek (French Creek tributary)

Name, Bank	River Mile (km)	Watershed Area in Square Miles (km^{2})	Average Discharge	Mouth Coordinates	Mouth Elevation	Source Coordinates	Source Elevation	Remarks
Mouth		77.89 square miles (201.7 km^{2})	180.76 cu ft/s (5.119 m^{3}/s)	41°59′56″N 079°48′47″W	1,273 ft (388 m)	42°08′25″N 79°40′17″W	1,610 ft (490 m)	West Branch French Creek rises in the Town of Mina, New York on the French Creek divide and then flows southwest and south to meet French Creek in the Borough of Wattsburg, Pennsylvania.
Bailey Brook, left bank	4.06 mi (6.53 km)	4.63 square miles (12.0 km^{2})	9.14 cu ft/s (0.259 m^{3}/s)	42°02′01″N 079°49′40″W	1,296 ft (395 m)	42°03′48″N 079°46′34″W	1,660 ft (510 m)	Bailey Brook rises on the French Creek divide about 3 miles southeast of Little Hope, Pennsylvania. The brook then flows southwest to meet West Branch French Creek about 0.5 miles north of Lowville, Pennsylvania.
Alder Brook, right bank	7.12 mi (11.46 km)	6.63 square miles (17.2 km^{2})	12.63 cu ft/s (0.358 m^{3}/s)	42°03′27″N 079°50′30″W	1,299 ft (396 m)	42°03′58″N 079°53′46″W	1,335 ft (407 m)	Alder Brook rises on the LeBoeuf Creek divide about 2 miles east of Bogus Corners, Pennsylvania. The brook then flows east to meet West Branch French Creek about 3 miles north-northwest of Lowville, Pennsylvania. Alder Brook is the largest West Branch tributary by watershed area.
Townley Run, right bank	11.00 mi (17.70 km)	4.71 square miles (12.2 km^{2})	9.36 cu ft/s (0.265 m^{3}/s)	42°05′03″N 079°50′55″W	1,312 ft (400 m)	42°07′59″N 079°51′22″W	1,450 ft (440 m)	Townley Run rises near Greenfield Church on the Sevenmile Creek divide. The run then flows southeast to meet West Branch French Creek about 2 miles southwest of Little Hope, Pennsylvania.
Darrow Brook, left bank	18.54 mi (29.84 km)	6.50 square miles (16.8 km^{2})	12.84 cu ft/s (0.364 m^{3}/s)	42°06′58″N 079°46′38″W	1,352 ft (412 m)	42°07′42″N 079°45′18″W	1,720 ft (520 m)	Darrow Brook rises about 4 miles west of French Creek, New York within the Town of Mina. The brook then flows north and northwest entering Erie County, Pennsylvania and meeting West Branch French Creek about 0.25 miles southeast of Ashton Corners, Pennsylvania. Darrow Brook is the largest West Branch tributary by average discharge.

== See also ==
- List of rivers of Pennsylvania
- List of tributaries of the Allegheny River
