= Bailey Brook (West Branch French Creek tributary) =

Stream in Pennsylvania, USA

Bailey Brook Tributary to West Branch French Creek
- Location of Bailey Brook mouth Bailey Brook (West Branch French Creek tributary) (the United States)

Location
- Country: United States
- State: Pennsylvania
- County: Erie
- Township: Venango

Physical characteristics
- Source: divide between Bailey Brook and French Creek
  - location: about 3 miles southeast of Little Hope, Pennsylvania
  - coordinates: 42°03′48″N 079°46′34″W
  - elevation: 1,660 ft (510 m)
- Mouth: West Branch French Creek
  - location: about 0.5 miles north of Lowville, Pennsylvania
  - coordinates: 42°02′01″N 079°49′40″W
  - elevation: 1,296 ft (395 m)
- Length: 4.39 mi (7.07 km)
- Basin size: 4.63 square miles (12.0 km^{2})
- Discharge
  - location: West Branch French Creek
  - average: 9.14 cu ft/s (0.259 m^{3}/s) at mouth with West Branch French Creek

Basin features
- Progression: West Branch French Creek → French Creek → Allegheny River → Ohio River → Mississippi River → Gulf of Mexico
- River system: Allegheny River
- Tributaries
  - left: unnamed tributaries
  - right: unnamed tributaries
- Bridges: Kimball Road (x2) and PA 89

Bailey Brook is a 4.39 mi (7.07 km) long tributary to West Branch French Creek that is classed as a 1st order stream on the EPA waters geoviewer site.

== Course ==
Bailey Brook rises in Venango Township of eastern Erie County, Pennsylvania and then flows southwest to meet West Branch French Creek near Lowville.

== Watershed ==
Bailey Brook drains 4.63 square miles (12.0 km^{2}) of Erie Drift Plain (glacial geology). The watershed receives an average of 46.6 in/year of precipitation and has a wetness index of 423.76. The watershed is about 54% forested.
