= Townley Run =

Stream in Pennsylvania, USA

Townley Run Tributary to West Branch French Creek
- Location of Townley Run mouth Townley Run (the United States)

Location
- Country: United States
- State: Pennsylvania
- County: Erie
- Townships: Venango; Greenfield

Physical characteristics
- Source: divide between Townley Run and Sevenmile Creek
  - location: just east of Greenfield Church
  - coordinates: 42°07′59″N 079°51′22″W
  - elevation: 1,450 ft (440 m)
- Mouth: West Branch French Creek
  - location: about 2 miles southwest of Little Hope, Pennsylvania
  - coordinates: 42°05′03″N 079°51′55″W
  - elevation: 1,312 ft (400 m)
- Length: 3.68 mi (5.92 km)
- Basin size: 4.71 square miles (12.2 km^{2})
- Discharge
  - location: West Branch French Creek
  - average: 9.36 cu ft/s (0.265 m^{3}/s) at mouth with West Branch French Creek

Basin features
- Progression: West Branch French Creek → French Creek → Allegheny River → Ohio River → Mississippi River → Gulf of Mexico
- River system: Allegheny River
- Tributaries
  - left: unnamed tributaries
  - right: unnamed tributaries
- Bridges: Station Road, Williams Road, Wildman Road, and New Road

Townley Run is a 3.68 mi (5.92 km) long tributary to West Branch French Creek that is classed as a 1st order stream on the EPA waters geoviewer site.

== Course ==
Townley Run rises in Greenfield Township of eastern Erie County, Pennsylvania and then flows southeast to meet West Branch French Creek southwest of Little Hope, Pennsylvania.

== Watershed ==
Townley Run drains 4.71 square miles (12.2 km^{2}) of Erie Drift Plain (glacial geology). The watershed receives an average of 47.0 in/year of precipitation and has a wetness index of 484.45. The watershed is about 53% forested.
