= Pennsylvania Route 426 =

State highway in Pennsylvania, US

Pennsylvania Route 426

Route information
- Maintained by PennDOT
- Length: 26.92 mi (43.32 km)

Southern segment
- Length: 19.85 mi (31.95 km)
- South end: PA 27 in Pittsfield Township
- Major intersections: PA 77 in Corry; US 6 in Corry
- North end: NY 426 at the New York state line near Clymer, NY

Northern segment
- Length: 7.07 mi (11.38 km)
- South end: NY 426 at the New York state line near Findley Lake, NY
- North end: PA 89 in North East

Location
- Country: United States
- State: Pennsylvania
- Counties: Warren, Erie

Highway system
- Pennsylvania State Route System; Interstate; US; State; Scenic; Legislative
← PA 425	→ PA 427
← PA 188	→ PA 190

Pennsylvania Route 426 (PA 426) is a 26-mile-long (42 km) state highway in Warren and Erie counties of Pennsylvania. The route is split up into two segments, connected by New York State Route 426 (NY 426) through New York. The southern terminus is at PA 27 in Pittsfield Township and the northern terminus is at PA 89 in North East.

== Route description ==
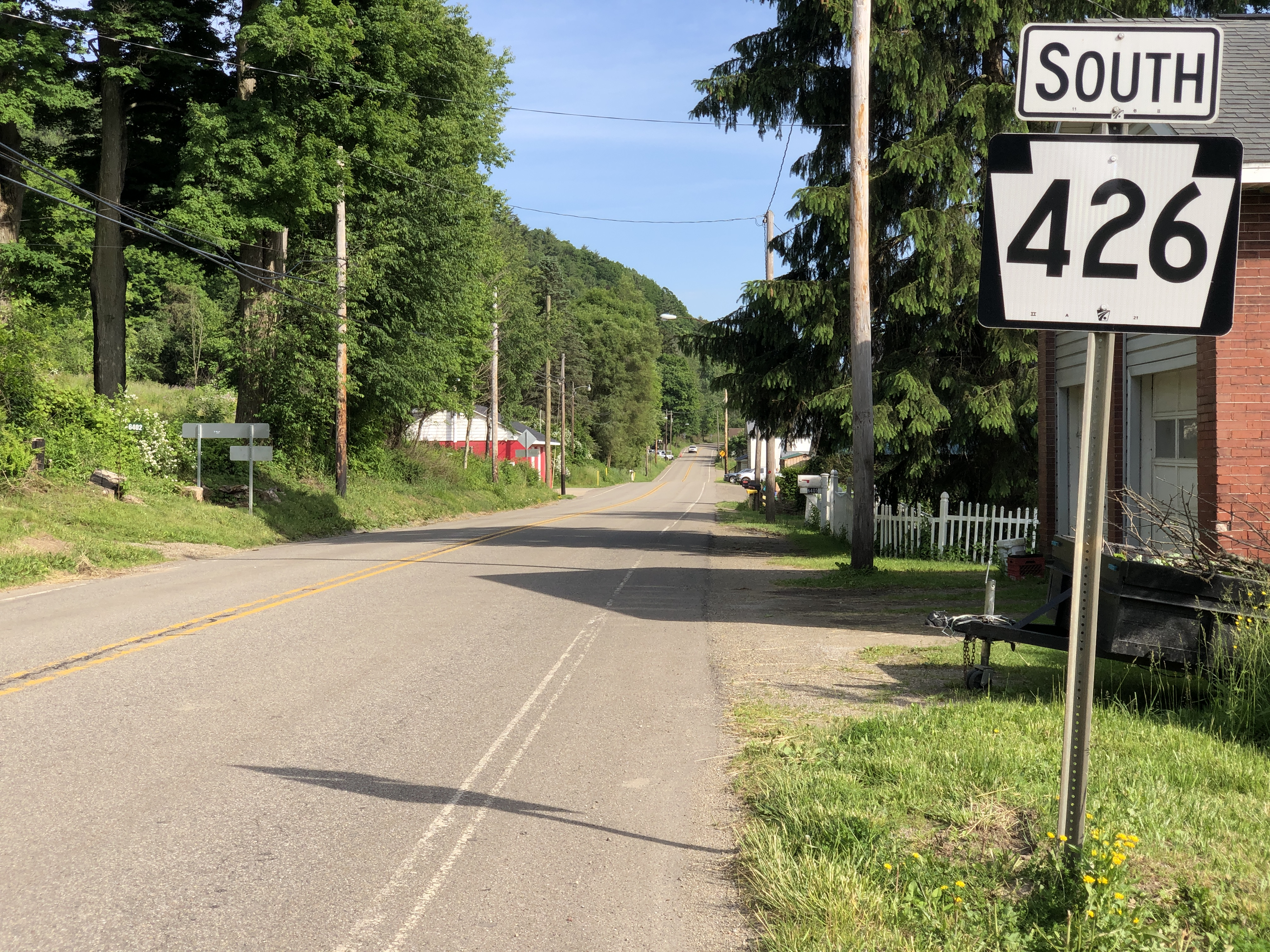
PA 426 southbound in Spring Creek

PA 426 begins at an intersection with PA 27 west of Pittsfield and north of Garland in Pittsfield Township. The route heads northwest through rural Warren County, intersecting Old PA 77 (also formerly known as PA 277) at Spring Creek on its way to the Erie County line and the city of Corry beyond. PA 426, now East Main Street, proceeds west through southern Corry to an intersection with PA 77 (West Main Street) at Center Street. PA 426 turns north onto Center, crossing over a set of railroad tracks immediately north of the junction with PA 77 and passing through northern Corry prior to meeting U.S. Route 6 near the northern city line. Outside of Corry, PA 426 becomes Hare Creek Road, named for the waterway that PA 426 parallels into New York, where it becomes NY 426.

At the opposite end of NY 426, the route re-enters Pennsylvania as the northern segment of PA 426. Like most of the areas surrounding the southern segment of PA 426, most of the northern portion is as equally rural. Other than the two routes at its termini, the northern PA 426 does not intersect any signed routes along its length. The route heads northwest, then west from the state line as Findley Lake Road. In the area surrounding the borough of North East, PA 426 passes under Interstate 90 prior to terminating at PA 89 near the southern edge of the borough.

== History ==
PA 426 was established in 1928, in Bedford County, northwest of Breezewood, as a short spur of Pennsylvania Route 26. By 1940, the designation was removed. The route existed on what is today the southernmost segment of Pennsylvania Route 36.

In the 1930s and 1940s, what is now PA 426, had many designations. The northern segment of route had no number in the 1930s. From Garland to Spring Creek, the route was Pennsylvania Route 77. From Spring Creek to Corry, it was designated as Pennsylvania Route 177. From the city of Corry to the New York state line, Pennsylvania Route 189 ran on PA 426.

By 1950, the route was commissioned along where it mostly runs today. The only exception was the southernmost segment of PA 426, which was still designated as PA 77 from Spring Creek to Garland.

By 1980, the southernmost section was redesignated from PA 77.

== Major intersections ==
County	Location	mi	km	Destinations	Notes
Warren	Pittsfield Township	0.00	0.00	PA 27 – Pittsfield, Warren, Titusville	Southern terminus
Erie	Corry	13.61	21.90	PA 77 west	Eastern terminus of PA 77
Erie	Corry	14.74	23.72	US 6 (Columbus Avenue) – Union City, Warren	
Erie	Wayne Township	19.85	31.95	NY 426 north	Continuation into New York
Connection made via NY 426 (13.32 mi or 21.44 km)
Erie	North East Township	0.00	0.00	NY 426 south – Findley Lake, Corry	Continuation into New York
Erie	North East	7.07	11.38	PA 89 (South Lake Street)	Northern terminus
1.000 mi = 1.609 km; 1.000 km = 0.621 mi
