= Findley Lake (lake) =

Lake in New York, United States

- Location within New York Location within the United States
- Location: Chautauqua County, New York, United States
- Coordinates: 42°06′22″N 079°43′33″W
- Basin countries: United States
- Surface area: 292 acres (1.18 km^{2})
- Average depth: 11 feet (3.4 m)
- Max. depth: 37 feet (11 m)
- Shore length^{1}: 5.5 miles (8.9 km)
- Surface elevation: 1,421 feet (433 m)
- Islands: 3
- Settlements: Findley Lake, New York
- ^{1} Shore length is not a well-defined measure.

Findley Lake is a lake south of the hamlet Findley Lake, New York. Fish species present in the lake are largemouth bass, northern pike, smallmouth bass, pumpkinseed sunfish, bluegill, walleye, yellow perch, and black bullhead. There is a state owned carry down launch located in Findley Lake off NY-426.
