= Hornby School =

- U.S. National Register of Historic Places
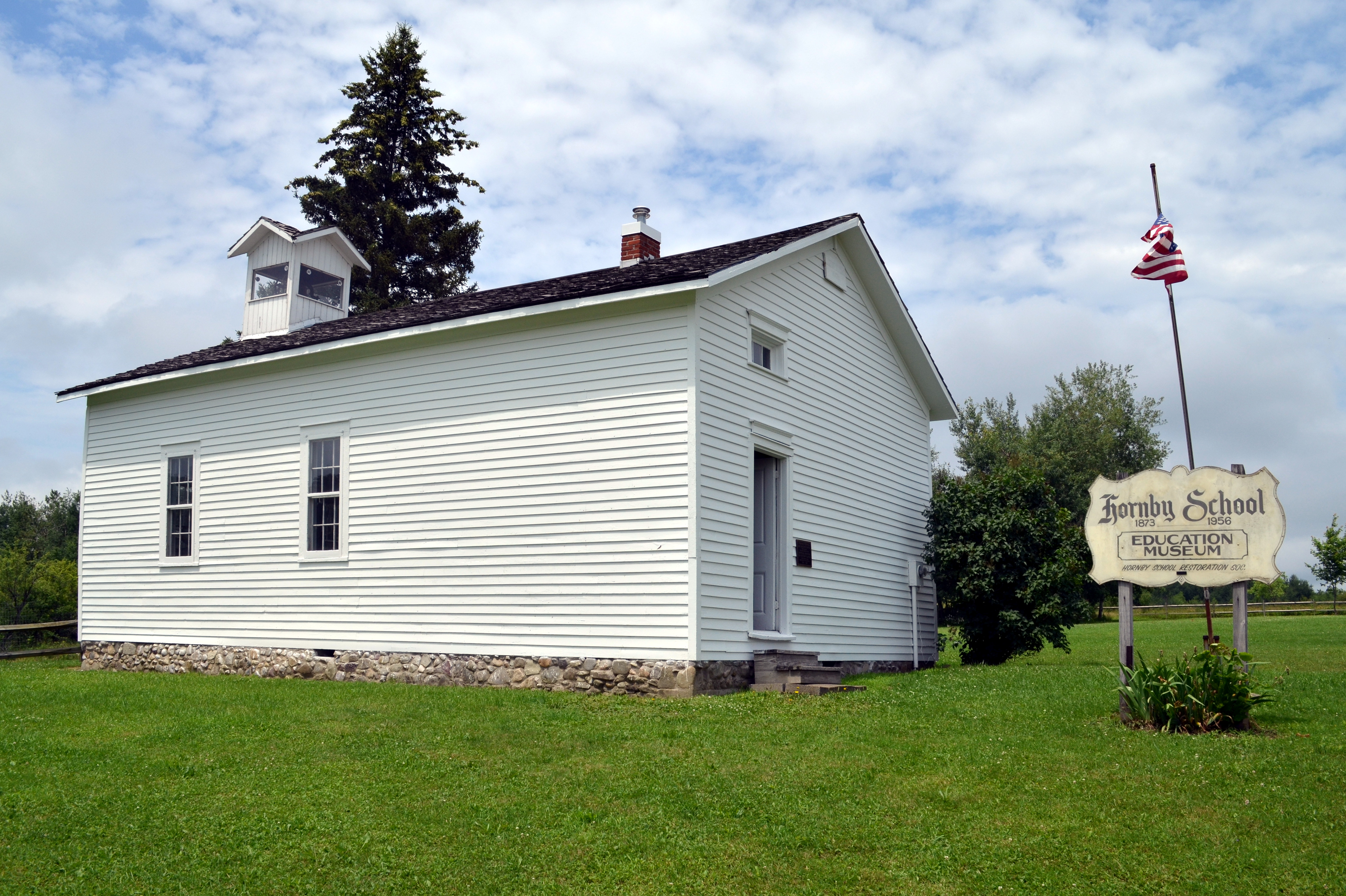
- Hornby School in June 2013

- Location within Pennsylvania Location within the United States
- Location: 10000 Station Road, Greenfield Township, Erie County, Pennsylvania
- Coordinates: 42°6′59.9″N 79°51′57.6″W
- Area: 1.1 acres (0.4 ha)
- Built: 1875
- Built by: Fred Hart
- Architectural style: Vernacular
- NRHP reference No.: 08000783
- Added to NRHP: August 13, 2008

Hornby School is a one-room schoolhouse in Greenfield Township, Erie County in the U.S. state of Pennsylvania. The school was one of the ten similar schools constructed in Greenfield Township, and is one of only two one-room schoolhouses remaining in Erie County that are not heavily altered. The schoolhouse was constructed in 1875, and was originally called Shadduck School. Hornby School stayed in continuous operation as a school until 1956. It was restored and opened as the Hornby School Museum in 1984, and was listed on National Register of Historic Places in 2008.

== Design ==
Hornby School is located on Station Road (Pennsylvania Route 430) in Greenfield Township, a 1/4-mile (0.4 km) from the intersection of Station and Williams Roads. The school consists of a one-story, frame building 36 feet (11 m) long and 22 feet (7 m). Its gable roof shingled with cedar shakes and topped with a belfry. The interior of the school divided into three rooms: the cloakroom, the wood storage room, and the school classroom. The schoolhouse was not built with indoor plumbing; water is supplied from a well and hand pump adjacent to the building. Also on the property is a two-person outhouse; only one stall is operational with the other being used for storage. The original holding pit beneath the outhouse was removed and replaced with a septic tank in 1982.

== History ==
The first school to be established in Greenfield Township was at Colt Station in 1820. Shadduck School was originally a log cabin built in 1850; the building was replaced in 1865 with another log cabin. After the passage of the Free Schools Acts of 1834 by the Pennsylvania General Assembly, state funding allowed Greenfield Township to build ten, frame, one-room schoolhouses that either replaced older schools or established new ones. On December 23, 1873, the Greenfield Township School Board authorized the construction of two new schoolhouses—replacing the older Shadduck School and another schoolhouse. The school board decided on a location for the building on June 12, 1875, and the school was completed by October 27.

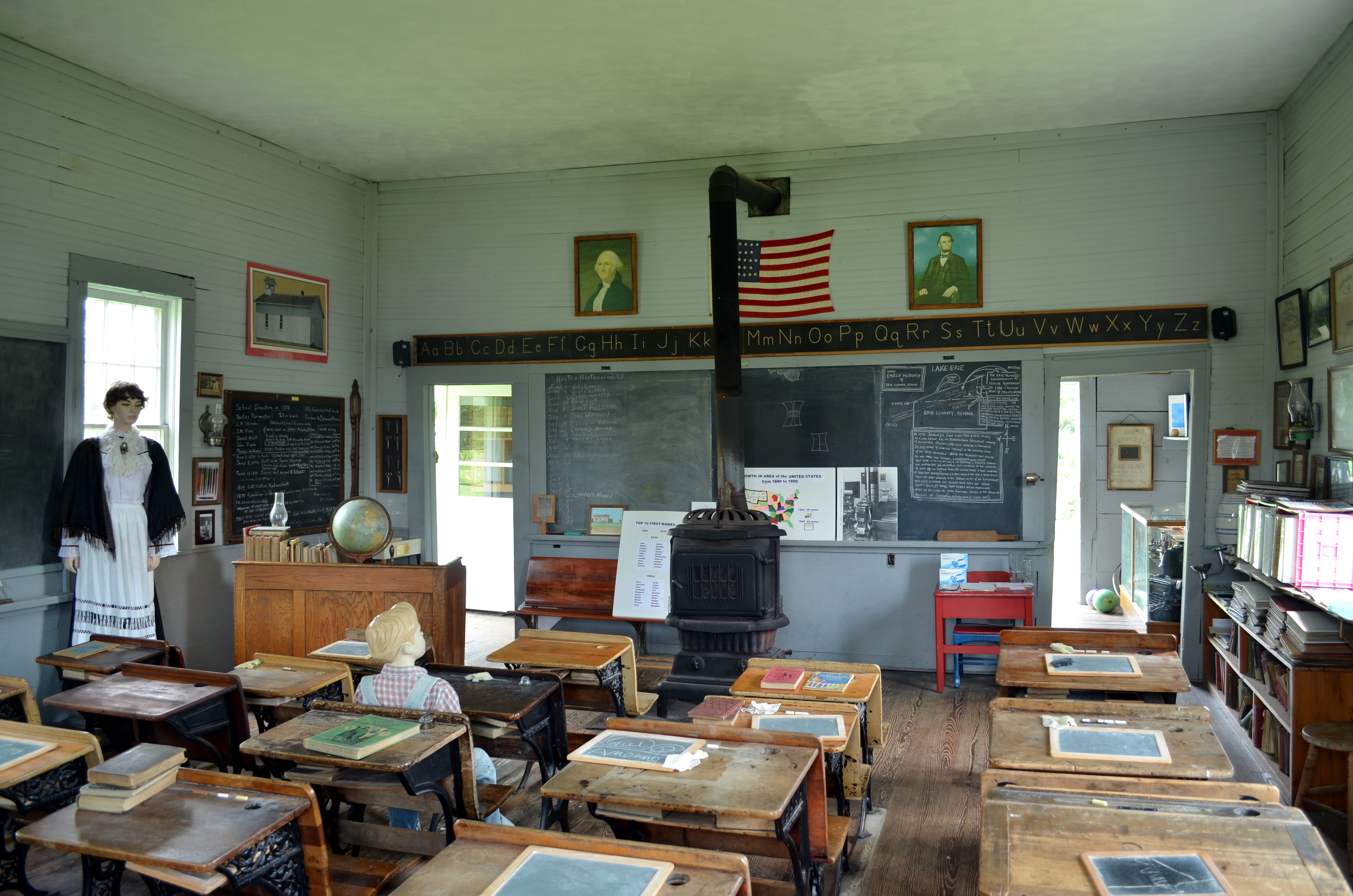
Interior of the schoolhouse

The school was known as Shadduck School until 1900, when it was changed to reflect the name of the nearest post office, Hornby. The school's belfry was also erected in 1900. Hornby School was closed in 1956 after the township became a part of the Wattsburg Area School District and the Greenfield Elementary School was completed. The property, including the building and its contents, were subsequently auctioned off.

The Hornby School Restoration Society was formed and the school, along with a 1/2-acre (0.2 ha) of land, was donated to the organization in 1973; an additional 1/2-acre (0.2 ha) was donated in 1991. Hornby School was reopened on August 26, 1984 and now functions as a museum. It was listed on the National Register of Historic Places on August 13, 2008.

The Hornby School is a working one-room schoolhouse and replicate the operation of the school from the 1870s to the early 1900s. Of the ten constructed in Greenfield Township and the six that survived to the 1940s, it is the only one that was not modified: one is an automotive parts store, three are residential homes, and another burned down in a fire. All of the "chalkboards, desks and other teaching implements" were original to Hornby School or were from one of the other schoolhouses in the township. The only other one-room schoolhouse in the county is located on the campus of Northwestern High School in Albion.

== See also ==
- List of museums in Pennsylvania
- National Register of Historic Places listings in Erie County, Pennsylvania

== Sources ==
- Prather, Linda R. (February 29, 2008). National Register of Historic Places Registration: Pennsylvania SP Hornby School. National Archives and Records Administration. (Downloading may be slow.)
