= Ely Bruce Dewing =

American merchant and politician

Ely Bruce Dewing (June 21, 1834 – August 7, 1902) was an American merchant and politician.

Born in French Creek, Chautauqua County, New York, Dewing moved to Elkhorn, Wisconsin Territory in 1843, From 1847 to 1854, Dewing lived in St. Joseph County, Michigan and then returned to Elkhorn. Ely held various county, town, and village offices and was a Republican. In 1879, Dewing served in the Wisconsin State Assembly. Dewing died at his home in Elkhorn, Wisconsin.
