= Clymer District School No. 5 =

Historic school building in New York, US

- U.S. National Register of Historic Places
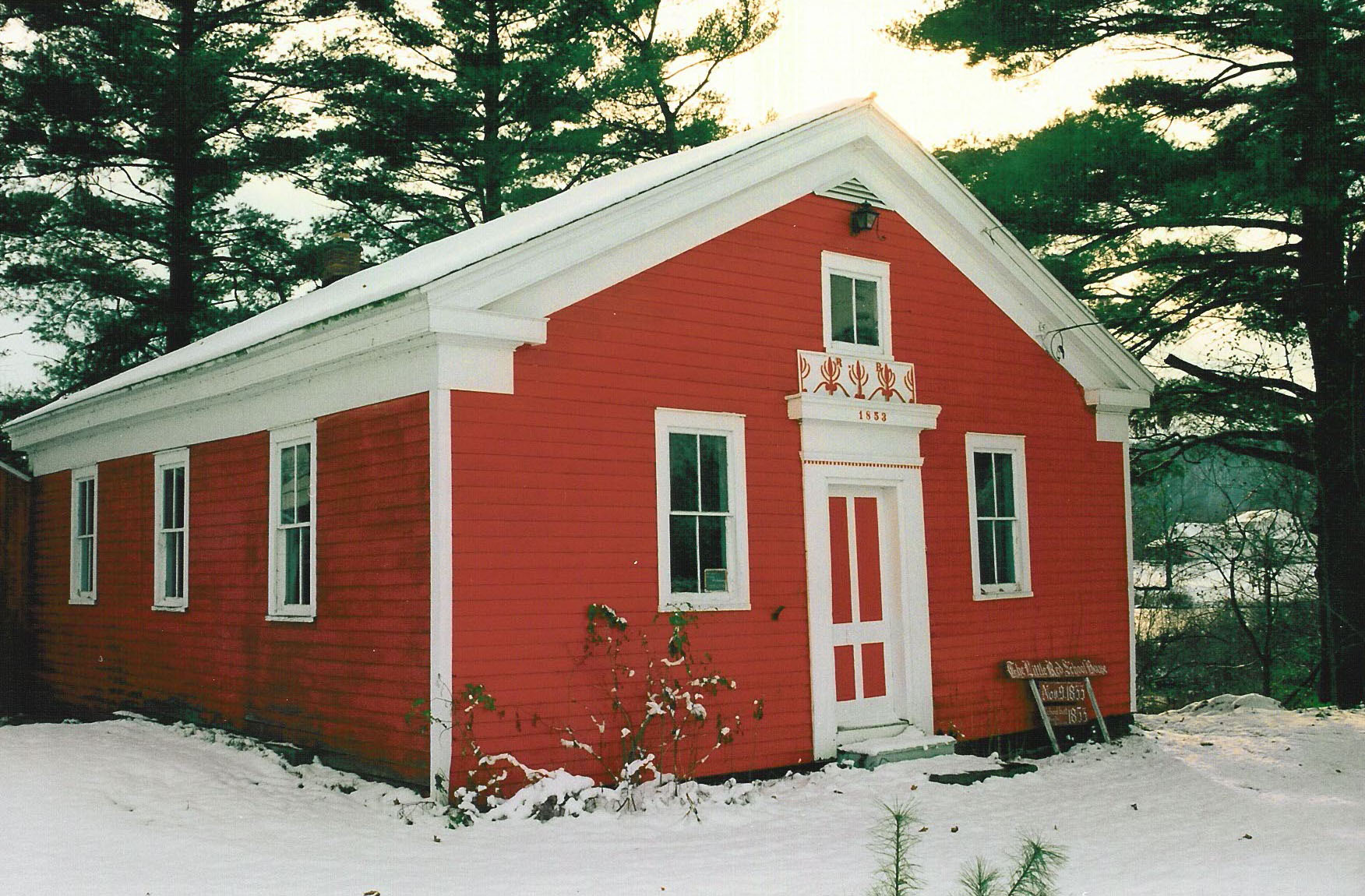
- Little Red Schoolhouse in 1997

- Location within New York Location within the United States
- Location: 7929 Clymer Center Rd. (Co. Rt. 613), Clymer, New York
- Coordinates: 42°3′17″N 79°34′57″W
- Built: 1853
- Architect: Braman, Rinaldo
- Architectural style: Greek Revival
- NRHP reference No.: 94001004
- Added to NRHP: August 29, 1994

Clymer District School No. 5, also known as the Little Red Schoolhouse, is a historic one-room school building located in Clymer, Chautauqua County, New York. It was designed and built around 1853 in the vernacular Greek Revival style.

It was listed on the National Register of Historic Places in 1994 in the United States.
