= Buells Corners, Pennsylvania =

Unincorporated community in Pennsylvania, US

Coordinates: 41°45′10.05″N 79°40′13.3″W

Buells Corners is an unincorporated community in Crawford County, Pennsylvania, United States, located in the northwestern part of the state. The village is located at the intersection of Pennsylvania Route 89 and Buells Corners Road in Rome Township.
