= L. B. Nims =

American politician

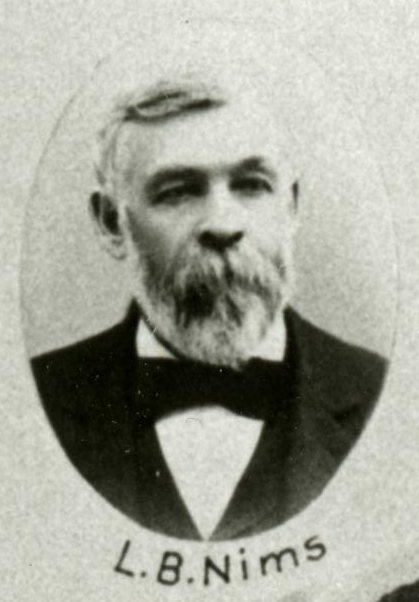
- Nims in 1895

Member of the Washington House of Representatives for the 28th district
- In office 1889–1890; 1895–1897

Personal details
- Born: March 8, 1837 Wattsburg, Pennsylvania, United States
- Died: December 25, 1918 (aged 81) Cosmopolis, Washington, United States
- Party: Republican

Luther Bingham Nims (March 8, 1837 – December 25, 1918) was an American politician in the state of Washington. He served in the Washington House of Representatives from 1895 to 1897 and 1889 to 1890.
