= New York State Route 426 =

State highway in Chautauqua County, New York, US

New York State Route 426
- Map of southwestern New York with NY 426 highlighted in red

Route information
- Maintained by NYSDOT
- Length: 13.32 mi (21.44 km)
- Existed: 1930–present

Major junctions
- South end: PA 426 at the Pennsylvania state line
- I-86 / NY 17 in Mina
- North end: PA 426 at the Pennsylvania state line

Location
- Country: United States
- State: New York
- Counties: Chautauqua

Highway system
- New York Highways; Interstate; US; State; Reference; Parkways
← NY 425	→ NY 427

New York State Route 426 (NY 426) is a state highway located entirely within Chautauqua County, New York, in the United States. It runs just over 13 miles (21 km) from one section of the Pennsylvania state line to another, passing through two small hamlets and providing the Southern Tier Expressway (I-86/NY 17) with its westernmost exit in New York. NY 426 is the westernmost north–south state highway in New York.

At both crossings of the state line it continues as Pennsylvania Route 426 (PA 426). It is the only other state highway besides NY 440 that can claim the distinction of being a middle segment of another state's similarly numbered highway. The New York alignment has remained virtually unchanged since it was assigned as part of the 1930 renumbering of state highways in New York, while the designations of the roads it connects to in Pennsylvania have varied over the years. The two segments of PA 426 were established at different times in the 1940s.

== Route description ==
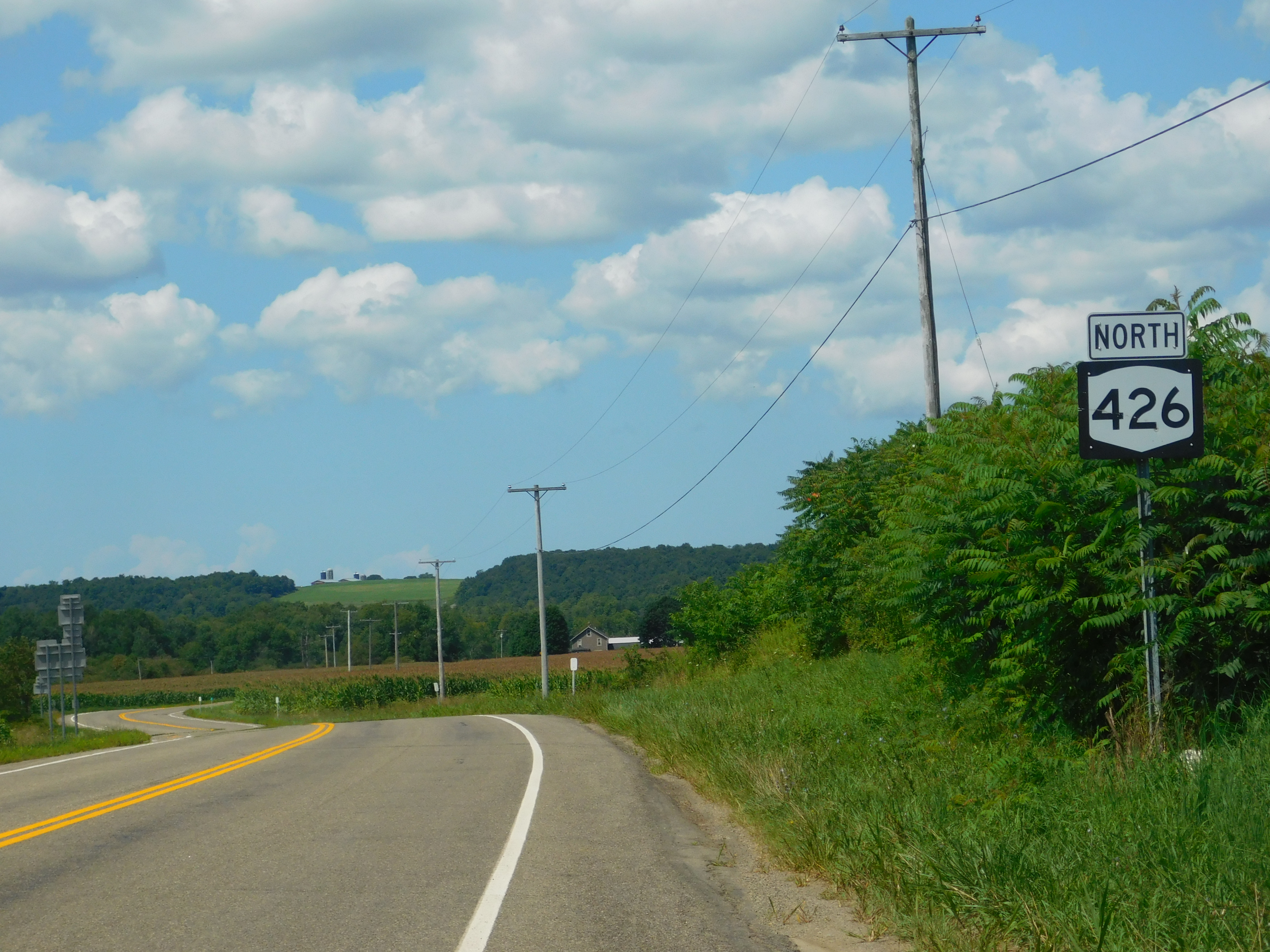
NY 426 north from NY 474 in French Creek

NY 426 begins where the southern segment of PA 426 leaves off at the Pennsylvania state line in French Creek 6 miles (10 km) north of Corry, Pennsylvania. The route heads north through rural southwestern Chautauqua County to the small community known as Cutting, where it overlaps NY 474 for one-tenth of a mile (0.16 km) westward before resuming its trek northward. Roughly 1.5 miles (2.4 km) north of Cutting, NY 426 veers to the west to avoid a large ridge situated near Beaver Meadow Brook, a small stream leading to French Creek. The route follows the brook to where it converges with the creek, then parallels French Creek northward toward the waterside hamlet of French Creek. The creek and NY 426 split south of the community, with the creek continuing along French Creek–Mina Road to the hamlet while NY 426 bypasses French Creek to the west. The route enters the town of Mina upon intersecting Harrington Hill Road a mile (1.6 km) to the north.

A half mile (0.8 km) into Mina, NY 426 comes within view of Findley Lake, a body of water 2 miles (3.2 km) long from south to north and as wide as one-half mile (0.80 km) at points. The route follows the eastern edge of the lake north to the hamlet of Findley Lake, situated at the northern tip of the lake. Here, NY 426 overlaps NY 430 westward for three blocks through the community prior to connecting to the Southern Tier Expressway (I-86 and NY 17) by way of an interchange 1 mile (1.6 km) north of Findley Lake. The exit is the westernmost exit on NY 17; however, the expressway itself continues west to I-90 near Erie, Pennsylvania, as I-86. Past the expressway, NY 426 continues northwest for another 2 miles (3.2 km) through nondescript terrain to the Pennsylvania state line, where it becomes the northern segment of PA 426.

== History ==
The entirety of NY 426 was assigned as part of the 1930 renumbering of state highways in New York as a northward extension of PA 189, a short route leading south to Corry, Pennsylvania. Originally, NY 426 broke from its modern alignment at French Creek–Mina Road to serve the hamlet of French Creek via French Creek–Mina and King roads before rejoining its current route west of the hamlet. The route was realigned onto its present alignment west of French Creek c. 1936. In the early 1940s, the 426 designation was extended southward into Pennsylvania as PA 426. It was also extended northwestward into Pennsylvania in the mid-1940s, effectively making NY 426 the missing segment of an otherwise discontinuous PA 426.

== Major intersections ==
The entire route is in Chautauqua County.

Location	mi	km	Destinations	Notes
French Creek	0.00	0.00	PA 426 south – Corry	Continuation into Pennsylvania
French Creek	2.08	3.35	NY 474 east – Clymer, Jamestown	Southern end of NY 474 concurrency
French Creek	2.19	3.52	NY 474 west – Erie, PA	Northern end of NY 474 concurrency; hamlet of Cutting
Mina	10.36	16.67	NY 430 east	Southern end of NY 430 concurrency; hamlet of Findley Lake
Mina	10.62	17.09	NY 430 west – North East, Erie, PA	Northern end of NY 430 concurrency
Mina	11.46	18.44	I-86 / NY 17 – Erie, PA, Jamestown, Binghamton	Exit 4 on I-86
Mina	13.32	21.44	PA 426 north	Continuation into Pennsylvania
1.000 mi = 1.609 km; 1.000 km = 0.621 mi
