= Alder Brook (West Branch French Creek tributary) =

Stream in Pennsylvania, USA

Alder Brook Tributary to West Branch French Creek
- Location of Alder Brook mouth Alder Brook (West Branch French Creek tributary) (the United States)

Location
- Country: United States
- State: Pennsylvania
- County: Erie
- Township: Venango

Physical characteristics
- Source: divide between Alder Brook and LeBeouf Creek
  - location: about 2 miles east of Bogus Corners, Pennsylvania
  - coordinates: 42°03′58″N 079°53′46″W
  - elevation: 1,335 ft (407 m)
- Mouth: West Branch French Creek
  - location: about 3 miles NNW of Lowville, Pennsylvania
  - coordinates: 42°03′27″N 079°50′30″W
  - elevation: 1,299 ft (396 m)
- Length: 2.93 mi (4.72 km)
- Basin size: 6.63 square miles (17.2 km^{2})
- Discharge
  - location: West Branch French Creek
  - average: 12.63 cu ft/s (0.358 m^{3}/s) at mouth with West Branch French Creek

Basin features
- Progression: West Branch French Creek → French Creek → Allegheny River → Ohio River → Mississippi River → Gulf of Mexico
- River system: Allegheny River
- Tributaries
  - left: unnamed tributaries
  - right: unnamed tributaries
- Bridges: Wattsburg Road, Phillipsville Road

Alder Brook is a 2.93 mi (4.72 km) long tributary to West Branch French Creek classified as a 1st order stream by the EPA Waters Geoviewer.

== Course ==
Alder Brook rises in Venango Township in eastern Erie County, Pennsylvania, and flows east to meet West Branch French Creek north of Lowville.

== Watershed ==
The Alder Brook watershed is part of the Erie Drift Plain (glacial geology) and covers an area of 6.63 square miles (17.2 km^{2}). The watershed receives an average of 46.2 inches per year of precipitation and has a wetness index of 473.57. About 41% of the watershed is forested.
