= Peek'n Peak =

Ski area in New York, United States

Peek'n Peak Resort & Spa
- Interactive map of Peek'n Peak Resort & Spa
- Location: Town of French Creek, Chautauqua County, near Findley Lake, New York, USA
- Nearest city: Erie
- Coordinates: 42°3′45″N 79°44′12″W
- Vertical: 400 ft (120 m)
- Top elevation: 1,800 ft (550 m)
- Base elevation: 1,400 ft (430 m)
- Skiable area: 130 acres (53 ha)
- Trails: 25
- Longest run: 4,100 ft (1,200 m)
- Lift system: 8 lifts; 5 Triples, 2 Doubles, 1 Surface
- Lift capacity: 11,560/hr
- Terrain parks: 4
- Snowfall: 105 inches
- Snowmaking: 85%
- Website: pknpk.com

Peek'n Peak Resort and Spa is ski resort in southwestern New York in Chautauqua County. The resort is located at the western end of the ski country snowbelt. Peek'n Peak opened in 1964. The lodge was built in the Tudor architecture style. Peek'n Peak has 27 skiing and snowboarding trails as well as a 18-hole golf course. In 2007 Peek'n Peak opened "The Spa at Peek'n Peak".

Peek'n Peak also hosts the annual Peek'n Peak Classic golf tournament.

In June 2010, Peek'n Peak filed for Chapter 11 bankruptcy, which the parent company attributes to the death of a co-owner. On August 24, 2011, the resort was purchased by Scott Enterprises, in an auction.
