= Darrow Brook =

Stream in Pennsylvania, USA

Darrow Brook Tributary to West Branch French Creek
- Location of Darrow Brook mouth Darrow Brook (the United States)

Location
- Country: United States
- States: Pennsylvania; New York
- Counties: Erie; Chautauqua

Physical characteristics
- Source: divide between Darrow Brook and French Creek
  - location: about 4 miles west of French Creek, New York
  - coordinates: 42°03′42″N 079°45′18″W
  - elevation: 1,720 ft (520 m)
- Mouth: West Branch French Creek
  - location: about 0.25 miles southeast of Ashton Corners, Pennsylvania
  - coordinates: 42°06′58″N 079°46′38″W
  - elevation: 1,352 ft (412 m)
- Length: 4.25 mi (6.84 km)
- Basin size: 6.50 square miles (16.8 km^{2})
- Discharge
  - location: West Branch French Creek
  - average: 12.84 cu ft/s (0.364 m^{3}/s) at mouth with West Branch French Creek

Basin features
- Progression: West Branch French Creek → French Creek → Allegheny River → Ohio River → Mississippi River → Gulf of Mexico
- River system: Allegheny River
- Bridges: Pekin Hill Road (x2), Wilson Road

Darrow Brook is a 4.25 mi (6.84 km) long tributary to West Branch French Creek that rises in Chautauqua County, New York and flows into Erie County, Pennsylvania. It is classed as a 1st order stream on the EPA waters geoviewer site.

== Course ==
Darrow Brook rises in the Town of Mina, New York in western Chautauqua County and flows north and northwest into Erie County, Pennsylvania to meet West Branch French Creek near Ashton Corners.

== Watershed ==
Darrow Brook drains 6.5 square miles (17 km^{2}) of Erie Drift Plain (glacial geology). The watershed receives an average of 46.8 in/year of precipitation and has a wetness index of 424.71. The watershed is about 59% forested.
