= Greenfield Township, Erie County, Pennsylvania =

Township in Pennsylvania, US

Coordinates: 42°08′00″N 79°49′59″W

Greenfield Township
- Township
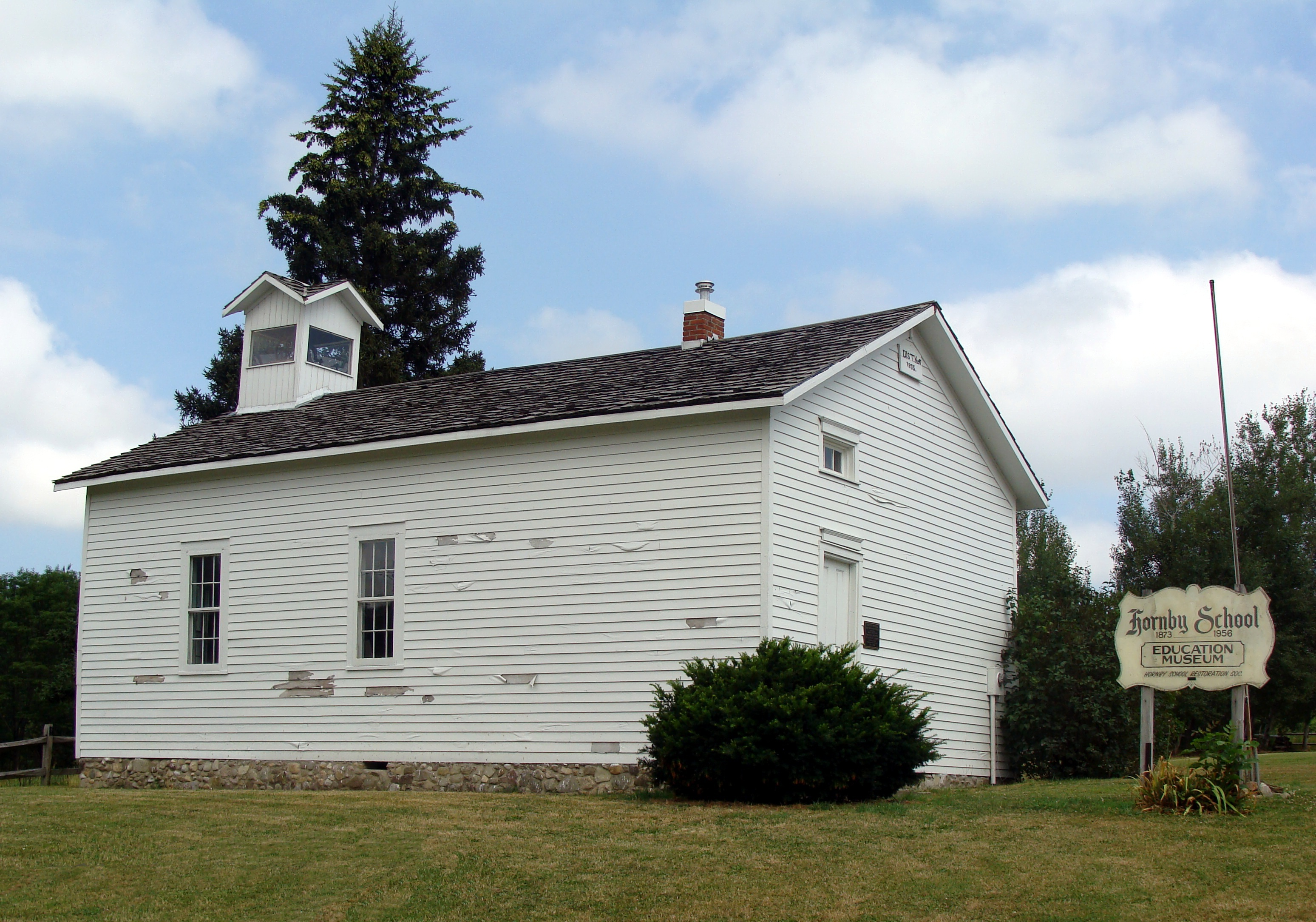
- Hornby School (1873); National Register of Historic Places

- Location in Erie County and the U.S. state of Pennsylvania
- Country: United States
- State: Pennsylvania
- County: Erie

Area
  - Total: 34.15 sq mi (88.45 km^{2})
  - Land: 33.77 sq mi (87.47 km^{2})
  - Water: 0.38 sq mi (0.99 km^{2})
- Highest elevation (southeast end of township, east of Macedonia Road): 1,660 ft (510 m)
- Lowest elevation (Eightmile Creek): 1,130 ft (340 m)

Population (2020)
  - Total: 1,804 ▼
  - Estimate (2024): 1,791
  - Density: 56.8/sq mi (21.92/km^{2})
- Time zone: UTC-4 (EST)
  - Summer (DST): UTC-5 (EDT)
- Area code: 814
- FIPS code: 42-049-31008
- Website: https://greenfieldtownship.info/

Greenfield Township is a township in Erie County, Pennsylvania, United States. The population was 1,804 at the 2020 census,

== History ==
The Hornby School was listed on the National Register of Historic Places in 2008.

== Geography ==
Greenfield Township is in eastern Erie County and is bordered to the east by Chautauqua County, New York. Interstate 86 crosses the township from east to west, with access from Exit 3 (Pennsylvania Route 89) in the north-central part of the township. I-86 has its western terminus in the northwest corner of the township, where it meets Interstate 90, 11 miles (18 km) east of Erie and 86 miles (138 km) southwest of Buffalo, New York.

According to the United States Census Bureau, Greenfield Township has a total area of 34.2 square miles (88.5 km^{2}), of which 33.8 square miles (87.5 km^{2}) is land and 0.39 square miles (1.0 km^{2}), or 1.11%, is water.

Greenfield Township is drained by West Branch French Creek and its tributaries, Townley Run and Darrow Brook and by Lake Erie tributaries including Twelvemile Creek, Eightmile Creek, and Sixmile Creek.

== Demographics ==
Historical population
Census	Pop.	Note	%±
2000	1,909		—
2010	1,933		1.3%
2020	1,804		−6.7%
2024 (est.)	1,791		−0.7%
U.S. Decennial Census

As of the census of 2000, there were 1,909 people, 666 households, and 534 families residing in the township. The population density was 56.4 inhabitants per square mile (21.8/km^{2}). There were 699 housing units at an average density of 20.7/sq mi (8.0/km^{2}). The racial makeup of the township was 97.85% White, 0.79% African American, 0.16% Native American, 0.10% Asian, 0.05% Pacific Islander, 0.16% from other races, and 0.89% from two or more races. Hispanic or Latino of any race were 0.42% of the population.

There were 666 households, out of which 40.7% had children under the age of 18 living with them, 68.8% were married couples living together, 5.4% had a female householder with no husband present, and 19.7% were non-families. 17.7% of all households were made up of individuals, and 4.7% had someone living alone who was 65 years of age or older. The average household size was 2.87 and the average family size was 3.22.

In the township the population was spread out, with 30.0% under the age of 18, 5.9% from 18 to 24, 30.8% from 25 to 44, 25.8% from 45 to 64, and 7.5% who were 65 years of age or older. The median age was 36 years. For every 100 females, there were 105.9 males. For every 100 females age 18 and over, there were 110.1 males.

The median income for a household in the township was $44,922, and the median income for a family was $50,352. Males had a median income of $33,750 versus $24,400 for females. The per capita income for the township was $17,569. About 4.3% of families and 5.3% of the population were below the poverty line, including 7.5% of those under age 18 and 3.4% of those age 65 or over.
