= Ripley (CDP), New York =

Ripley, New York
- Census-designated place
- Location within the state of New York
- Coordinates: 42°15′56″N 79°42′40″W
- Country: United States
- State: New York
- County: Chautauqua
- Town: Ripley

Area
  - Total: 1.37 sq mi (3.55 km^{2})
  - Land: 1.37 sq mi (3.55 km^{2})
  - Water: 0 sq mi (0.00 km^{2})
- Elevation: 735 ft (224 m)

Population (2020)
  - Total: 852
  - Density: 621.1/sq mi (239.79/km^{2})
- Time zone: UTC-5 (Eastern (EST))
  - Summer (DST): UTC-4 (EDT)
- ZIP code: 14775
- Area code: 716
- FIPS code: 36-61874
- GNIS feature ID: 0962542

Ripley is a census-designated place (CDP) in the town of Ripley in Chautauqua County, New York, United States. As of the 2010 census, the population of the CDP was 872, out of a total town population of 2,415.

Ripley is located on U.S. Route 20 and Interstate 90 in the northeast corner of the town. Ripley is a few miles east of the Pennsylvania border.

== Geography ==
According to the U.S. Census, the CDP has a total area of 1.37 square miles (3.55 km^{2}), all land.

== Demographics ==
Historical population
Census	Pop.	Note	%±
2020	852		—
U.S. Decennial Census

As of the census of 2000, there were 1,030 people, 418 households, and 285 families residing in the CDP. The population density was 753.0 inhabitants per square mile (290.7/km^{2}). There were 455 housing units at an average density of 128.2 persons/km^{2} (332.6 persons/sq mi). The racial makeup of the CDP was 98.35% White, 0.29% African American, 0.10% Pacific Islander, 0.19% from other races, and 1.07% from two or more races. Hispanic or Latino of any race were 1.55% of the population.

There were 418 households, out of which 28.2% had children under the age of 18 living with them, 52.9% were married couples living together, 10.5% had a female householder with no husband present, and 31.8% were non-families. 26.6% of all households were made up of individuals, and 15.3% had someone living alone who was 65 years of age or older. The average household size was 2.46 and the average family size was 2.97.

In the CDP, the population was spread out, with 25.4% under the age of 18, 9.1% from 18 to 24, 26.4% from 25 to 44, 21.7% from 45 to 64, and 17.4% who were 65 years of age or older. The median age was 38 years. For every 100 females, there were 100.0 males. For every 100 females age 18 and over, there were 89.2 males.

The median income for a household in the CDP was $33,125, and the median income for a family was $37,188. Males had a median income of $28,125 versus $24,135 for females. The per capita income for the CDP was $16,966. About 8.0% of families and 10.9% of the population were below the poverty line, including 15.2% of those under the age of 18 and 20.0% ages 65 or older.
