= French Creek, New York =

- Town
- Location within Chautauqua County and New York state

- Location within New York Location within the United States
- Coordinates: 42°2′44″N 79°41′57″W
- Country: United States
- State: New York
- County: Chautauqua

Government
  - Type: Town Council
  - Town Supervisor: David J. White (R)
  - Town Council: Members' List: • George Yaiko (R); • Leo McCray (R); • Norvel R. Willink (R); • Paul W. Carey (R)

Area
  - Total: 36.28 sq mi (93.96 km^{2})
  - Land: 36.26 sq mi (93.91 km^{2})
  - Water: 0.019 sq mi (0.05 km^{2})
- Elevation: 1,414 ft (431 m)

Population (2020)
  - Total: 997
  - Estimate (2021): 987
  - Density: 24.2/sq mi (9.35/km^{2})
- Time zone: UTC-5 (Eastern (EST))
  - Summer (DST): UTC-4 (EDT)
- ZIP Code: 14724 (Clymer)
- FIPS code: 36-013-27606
- GNIS feature ID: 0978977
- Website: frenchcreekny.org

French Creek is a town in Chautauqua County, New York, United States. The population was 997 at the 2020 census. The town is named after the stream flowing through it, which ultimately flows to the Allegheny River in Pennsylvania. The town of French Creek is located in the far southwestern corner of the state.

== History ==
The land was first settled circa 1811. The town of French Creek was founded in 1829 from part of the town of Clymer.

== Geography ==
According to the United States Census Bureau, the town has a total area of 36.3 square miles (94.0 km^{2}), of which 0.02 square miles (0.05 km^{2}), or 0.06%, is water.

French Creek, which flows southward through the town, is a tributary of the Allegheny River. Its tributaries are Beaver Meadow Brook, Cutting Brook and Herrick Creek.

New York State Route 426 is a major north–south route through the town and intersects New York State Route 474, an east–west highway at Cutting.

=== Adjacent towns and areas ===
French Creek is bordered by the state of Pennsylvania to the west and south. To the west is Venango Township and to the south is Wayne Township, both in Erie County, Pennsylvania. The north town line is the border of the town of Mina, and the east town line is shared with the town of Clymer.

== Demographics ==
Historical population
Census	Pop.	Note	%±
1830	420		—
1840	621		47.9%
1850	725		16.7%
1860	968		33.5%
1870	973		0.5%
1880	1,042		7.1%
1890	1,033		−0.9%
1900	1,014		−1.8%
1910	882		−13.0%
1920	806		−8.6%
1930	768		−4.7%
1940	694		−9.6%
1950	817		17.7%
1960	906		10.9%
1970	848		−6.4%
1980	878		3.5%
1990	916		4.3%
2000	935		2.1%
2010	906		−3.1%
2020	997		10.0%
2021 (est.)	987		−1.0%
U.S. Decennial Census

As of the census of 2000, there were 935 people, 332 households, and 260 families residing in the town. The population density was 25.8 inhabitants per square mile (10.0/km^{2}). There were 592 housing units at an average density of 16.3 per square mile (6.3/km^{2}). The racial makeup of the town was 98.93% White, 0.11% Native American, 0.11% Asian, 0.11% from other races, and 0.75% from two or more races.

There were 332 households, out of which 40.4% had children under the age of 18 living with them, 69.0% were married couples living together, 4.5% had a female householder with no husband present, and 21.4% were non-families. 19.0% of all households were made up of individuals, and 7.5% had someone living alone who was 65 years of age or older. The average household size was 2.82 and the average family size was 3.21.

In the town, the population was spread out, with 31.1% under the age of 18, 6.7% from 18 to 24, 30.4% from 25 to 44, 19.7% from 45 to 64, and 12.1% who were 65 years of age or older. The median age was 35 years. For every 100 females, there were 113.0 males. For every 100 females age 18 and over, there were 111.8 males.

The median income for a household in the town was $36,667, and the median income for a family was $38,688. Males had a median income of $28,583 versus $19,444 for females. The per capita income for the town was $15,496. About 9.7% of families and 12.4% of the population were below the poverty line, including 14.8% of those under age 18 and 9.3% of those age 65 or over.

== Notable people ==
- Ely B. Dewing, Wisconsin State Assemblyman
- Tommy Leach, major league baseball player who was in the first World Series

== Communities and locations in the town of French Creek ==
- Cutting – A hamlet in the south part of the town on State Route 474.
- French Creek – A stream that flows through the town into Pennsylvania; tributary of the Allegheny River.
- French Creek – The hamlet of French Creek, located on County Road 4 (French Creek–Mina Road) and French Creek.
- Marks Corners – A location in the northeast corner of the town.
- Marvin – A hamlet in the southwest corner of the town.
- Morgan Corners – A hamlet in the east side of the town at Bush and Ravlin Roads.
- Peek'n Peak – A skiing area in the western part of the town.
