= Ripley, New York =

- Town
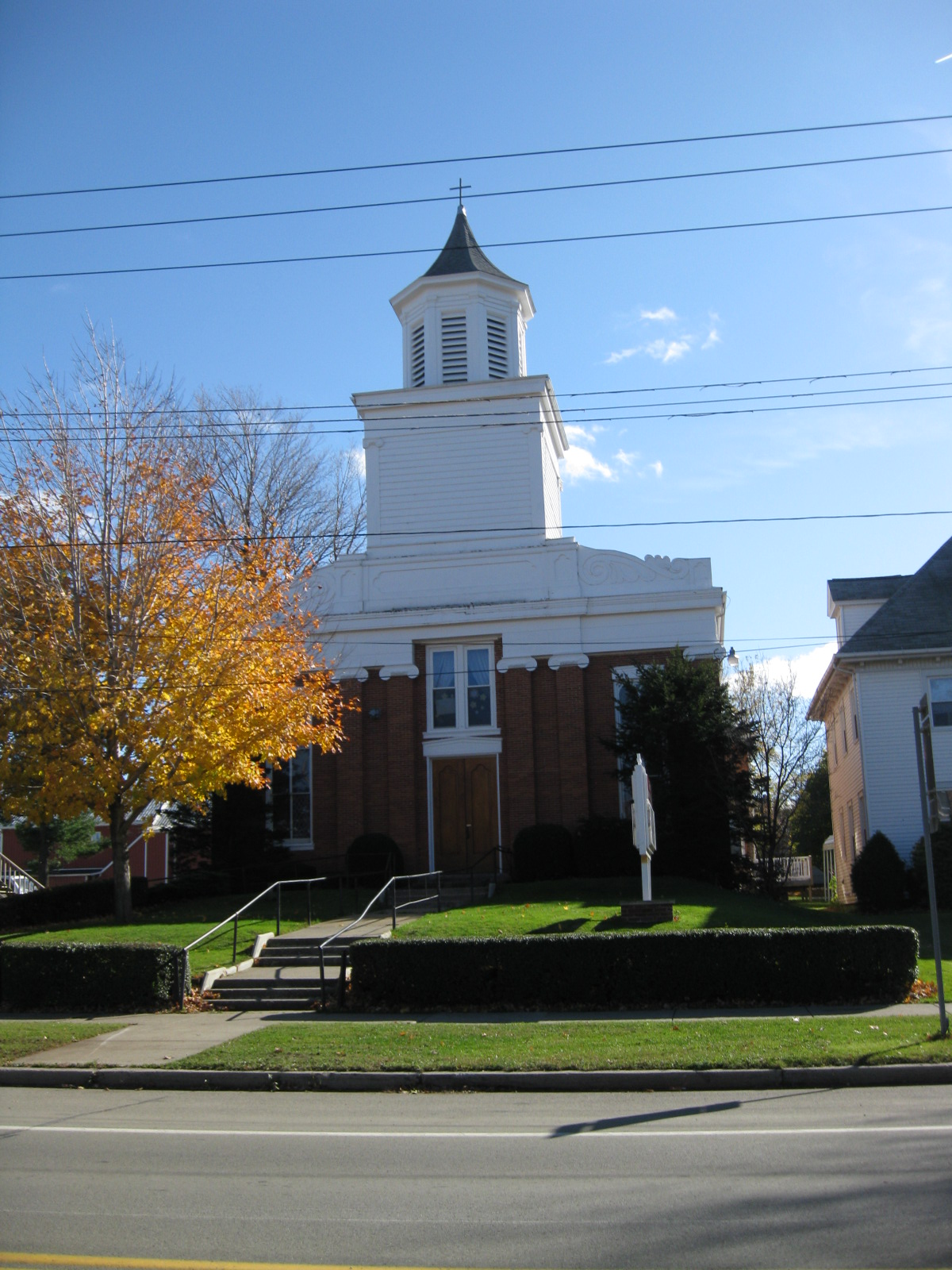
- Church in Ripley
- Motto: "The Gateway to New York State"
- Location in Chautauqua County and New York state

- Location within New York Location within the United States
- Coordinates: 42°15′42″N 79°41′53″W
- Country: United States
- State: New York
- County: Chautauqua
- Named after: Eleazer W. Ripley

Government
  - Type: Town Council
  - Town Supervisor: Douglas Bowen
  - Town Council: Members' List: • Deborah Hunt (D); • Kirk J. Carris (R); • Douglas A. Bowen (D); • Patricia A. Hathaway (R)

Area
  - Total: 48.87 sq mi (126.57 km^{2})
  - Land: 48.76 sq mi (126.30 km^{2})
  - Water: 0.10 sq mi (0.27 km^{2})
- Elevation: 1,299 ft (396 m)

Population (2020)
  - Total: 2,310
  - Estimate (2021): 2,292
  - Density: 47.6/sq mi (18.38/km^{2})
- Time zone: UTC-5 (Eastern (EST))
  - Summer (DST): UTC-4 (EDT)
- ZIP Codes: 14775 (Ripley); 14787 (Westfield)
- Area code: 716
- FIPS code: 36-013-61885
- GNIS feature ID: 0979424
- Website: www.ripleyny.gov

Ripley is a town on Lake Erie in the westernmost part of Chautauqua County, New York, United States. The population was 2,310 at the time of the 2020 census. The town was named after Eleazer Wheelock Ripley, a general in the War of 1812. There are no incorporated villages in the town, but there is one census-designated place: the hamlet of Ripley. The town is perhaps best known as being the western terminus of the New York State Thruway.

== History ==
Ripley was first settled circa 1804 in the vicinity of Ripley village. The town was established in 1817 from part of the town of Portland.

Much of the economy of the town in recent years has been based on growing fruit, especially Concord grapes.

== Notable people ==
- Richard Theodore Ely, economist
- B.F. Goodrich, founder of the popular rubber company
- Charles Mann Hamilton, former US congressman
- Dudley Marvin, former US congressman
- Joseph A. McGinnies, former New York state assemblyman
- Edward Orton Sr., first president of the Ohio State University

== Geography ==
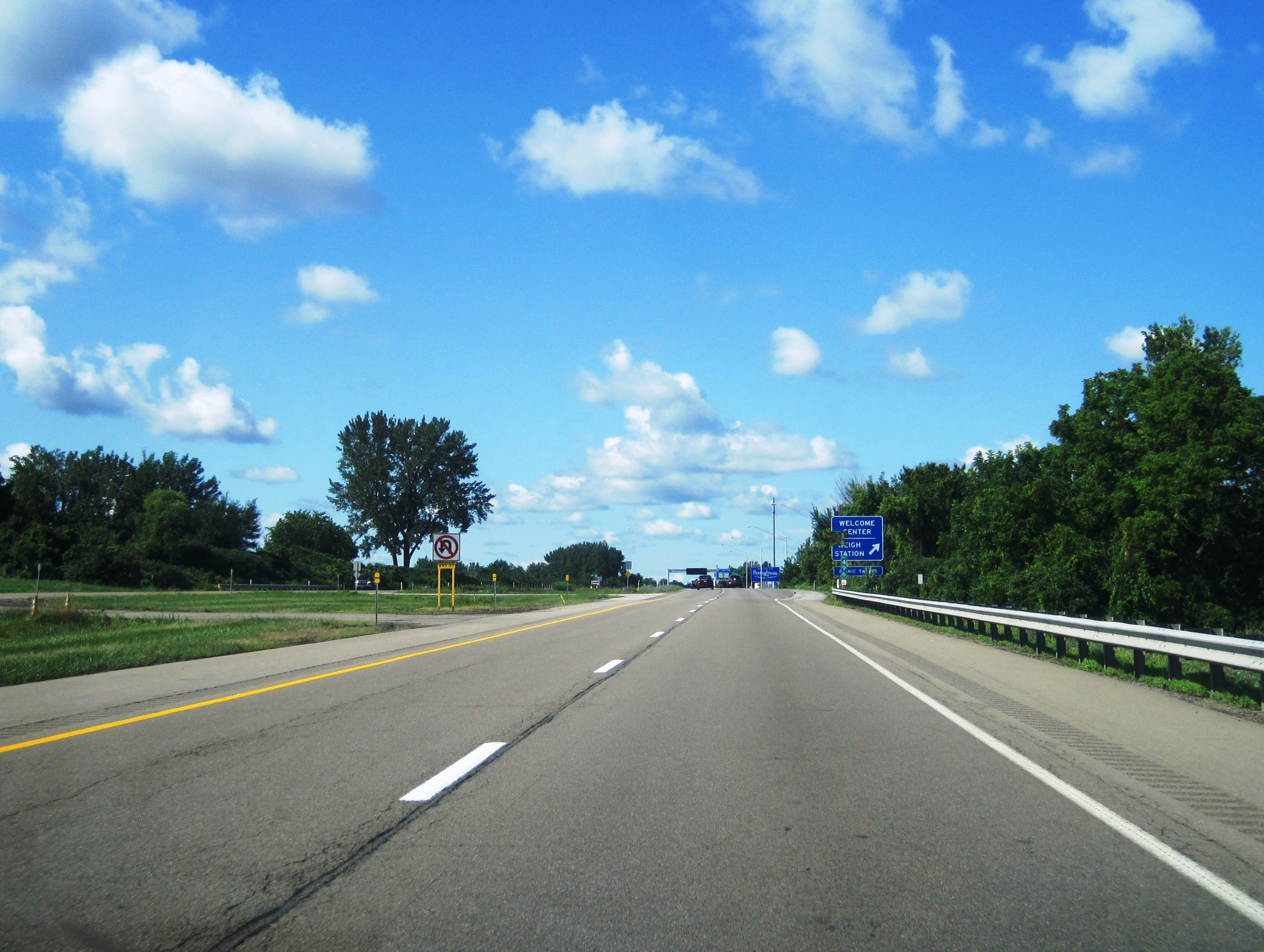
Western terminus of the New York State Thruway in Ripley at the Pennsylvania state line

According to the United States Census Bureau, the town has a total area of 48.9 square miles (126.6 km^{2}), of which 48.8 square miles (126.3 km^{2}) is land and 0.12 square miles (0.3 km^{2}), or 0.21%, is water.

The New York State Thruway (Interstate 90), US 20, NY 5, and NY 76 pass through the town.

=== Adjacent towns and areas ===
(Clockwise)

- Lake Erie
- Westfield
- Mina
- North East Township, Erie County, Pennsylvania

== Demographics ==
Historical population
Census	Pop.	Note	%±
1820	1,111		—
1830	1,647		48.2%
1840	2,197		33.4%
1850	1,732		−21.2%
1860	2,013		16.2%
1870	1,946		−3.3%
1880	1,990		2.3%
1890	2,020		1.5%
1900	2,256		11.7%
1910	2,239		−0.8%
1920	2,116		−5.5%
1930	2,254		6.5%
1940	2,250		−0.2%
1950	2,694		19.7%
1960	2,848		5.7%
1970	2,934		3.0%
1980	3,181		8.4%
1990	2,967		−6.7%
2000	2,636		−11.2%
2010	2,415		−8.4%
2020	2,310		−4.3%
2021 (est.)	2,292	▼	−0.8%
U.S. Decennial Census

As of the census of 2000, there were 2,636 people, 1,004 households, and 722 families residing in the town. The population density was 53.9 inhabitants per square mile (20.8/km^{2}). There were 1,211 housing units at an average density of 9.6 persons/km^{2} (24.7 persons/sq mi). The racial makeup of the town was 98.25% White, 0.19% African American, 0.11% Native American, 0.08% Asian, 0.04% Pacific Islander, 0.34% from other races, and 0.99% from two or more races. 1.44% of the population were Hispanic or Latino of any race.

There were 1,004 households, out of which 33.0% had children under the age of 18 living with them, 57.8% were married couples living together, 7.7% have a woman whose husband does not live with her, and 28.0% were non-families. 23.4% of all households were made up of individuals, and 11.6% had someone living alone who was 65 years of age or older. The average household size was 2.63 and the average family size was 3.08.

In the town, the population was spread out, with 26.5% under the age of 18, 8.6% from 18 to 24, 27.4% from 25 to 44, 22.5% from 45 to 64, and 15.0% who were 65 years of age or older. The median age was 38 years. For every 100 females, there were 103.7 males. For every 100 females age 18 and over, there were 98.1 males.

The median income for a household in the town was $33,237, and the median income for a family was $37,083. Males had a median income of $28,278 versus $23,359 for females. The per capita income for the town was $15,652. 10.3% of the population and 7.8% of families were below the poverty line. Out of the total people living in poverty, 12.1% are under the age of 18 and 9.9% are 65 or older.

== Communities and locations in Ripley ==
- East Ripley – A small hamlet on Route 20 in the northeastern corner of the town between Forsyth and Ripley
- Forsyth – A hamlet on Route 20 in the northeastern corner of the town
- Minnegar Corners – A hamlet at the junction of Greenbush (Route 76) and Noble roads near the eastern town line
- Raters Corners – A location in the southeastern part of the town on County Road 22
- Ripley – The hamlet of Ripley, located on Route 20 in the north central part of the town. This community was once known as "Quincy."
- Ripley Beach – A location on the shore of Lake Erie, north of Forsyth
- Sheldon Corners – A location in the southeastern part of the town on County Road 22
- Shore Haven – a hamlet on the shore of Lake Erie and the eastern town line
- South Ripley – A hamlet in the southwestern part of the town on County Road 6
- State Line – a hamlet at the Pennsylvania-New York boundary on Route 20
- Wattlesburg – A hamlet in the center of the town, south of Ripley village

== Notable people ==
- William Avery Cochrane, member of the Wisconsin State Assembly
- Richard T. Ely, economist and author
- Benjamin Goodrich, industrialist and businessman in the rubber industry
- John H. Haight resting place, soldier in the American Civil War
- Charles Mann Hamilton, politician who represented New York's 43rd congressional district
- Bruce Johnstone, New Zealand-born jazz baritone saxophone player
- Dudley Marvin, politician who represented New York's 26th and 31st congressional district
- Joseph A. McGinnies, businessman and politician
- William Spencer Newbury, politician who served as the 23rd mayor of Portland, Oregon
