= Findley Lake, New York =

Town in New York, United States

Coordinates: 42°07′09″N 79°43′57″W

Findley Lake is part of the town of Mina in southwestern Chautauqua County, New York, United States. Situated at an elevation of 1440 ft (439 m) above sea level, this hamlet is located on the north shore of Findley Lake.

== History ==
Findley Lake was settled by War of 1812 veteran Alexander Findley, a native of Northern Ireland who had emigrated to America sometime around 1769, settled in eastern Pennsylvania, married and started a family, and returned to Ireland for a few years before making the decision to live permanently in the United States. After purchasing land in Greenfield, Pennsylvania, in 1805, he then purchased lot 52, near what is now Findley Lake, from the Holland Land Company in 1811, and built a dam there in 1815 to power his mill, thus creating the lake from two ponds. The settlement that grew up around the mills prospered.

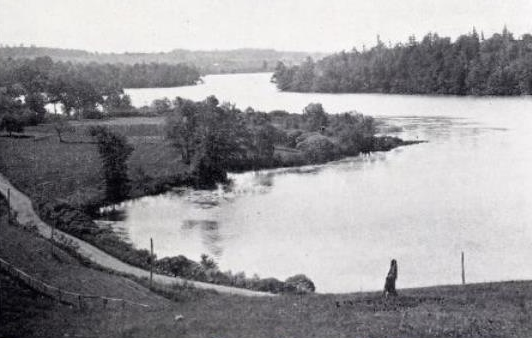
Findley Lake, Chautauqua County, New York, circa 1904

The Lakeside Assembly on the southwest shore entertained visitors to the region, during the summers between 1895 and 1915, with programs that rivaled Chautauqua Assembly, at the Chautauqua Institution. Founded in 1895 by United Brethren minister Rev. C. G. Langdon, who lived in a parsonage on the lake's east shore, the Lakeside Assembly's first president was Dr. F. E. Lilley, who was succeeded by American Civil War veteran and U.S. Medal of Honor winner Ebenezer Skellie. The Assembly was reached by two steamboats, the Silver Spray and the Daisy. The United Methodist Church (which absorbed the United Brethren in 1968) continued to operate a summer camp, Camp Findley, in the hamlet of Findley Lake until the early 21st century.

Findley Lake is a four season getaway for camping at Paradise Bay Park Family Campground (located right on the lake), hiking, biking, golf, fishing, hunting, boating, skiing and snowmobiles. Peek'n Peak Four Season Resort is less than five miles and all hamlet and town roads are approved and marked as snowmobile trails. The community has antique and specialty shops as well as restaurants, bed and breakfasts and country inns.

== Geography ==
Findley Lake is entirely centered in the town of Mina. The hamlet is approximately 19 miles east of Erie, 11 miles of south Ripley, 16 miles north-northwest of Corry, Pennsylvania, and about 27 miles west of Jamestown. Though the main routes are State Routes 426 and 430, there is access to Findley Lake via Interstate 86 (exit 4). Other secondary routes include county routes 1 and 78.
