= Little Hope, Pennsylvania =

Unincorporated community in Pennsylvania, U.S.

Coordinates: 42.098921°N 79.818939°W

Little Hope is an unincorporated community in Erie County, Pennsylvania, United States.

== History ==
The origin of the name "Little Hope" is obscure. A variant name was "Greenfield". A post office called Greenfield was established in 1822, and remained in operation until 1905.
