= Amity Township, Erie County, Pennsylvania =

Township in Pennsylvania, US

Amity Township
- Township
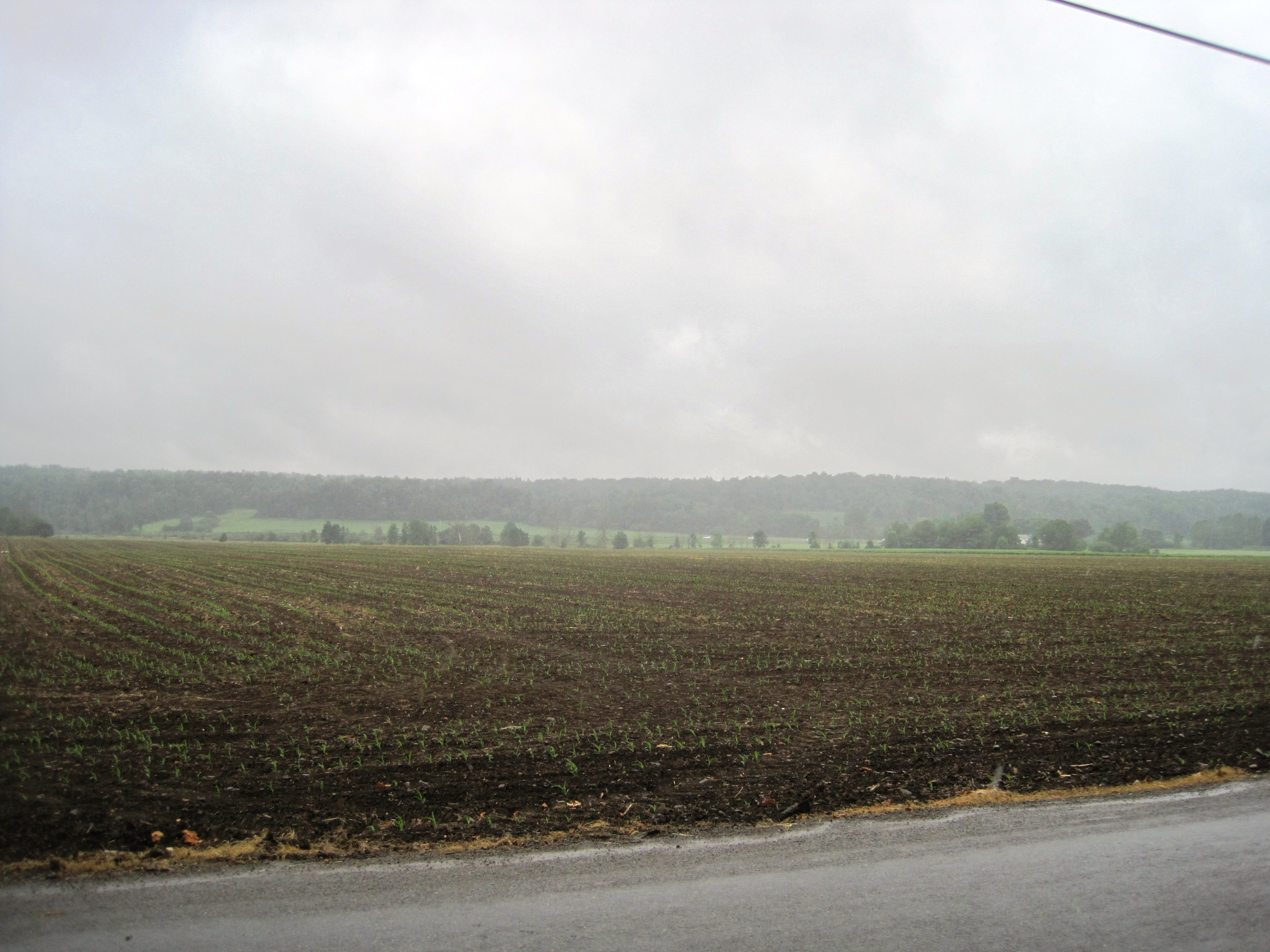
- Farmland in Amity Township along Old State Line Road

- Location in Erie County and the U.S. state of Pennsylvania
- Coordinates: 41°58′00″N 79°48′59″W
- Country: United States
- State: Pennsylvania
- County: Erie

Area
  - Total: 28.17 sq mi (72.97 km^{2})
  - Land: 28.02 sq mi (72.57 km^{2})
  - Water: 0.15 sq mi (0.40 km^{2})
- Highest elevation (several points east of Lyons Road): 1,700 ft (520 m)
- Lowest elevation (French Creek): 1,240 ft (380 m)

Population (2020)
  - Total: 983 ▼
  - Estimate (2024): 977
  - Density: 37.8/sq mi (14.61/km^{2})
- Time zone: UTC-4 (EST)
  - Summer (DST): UTC-5 (EDT)
- Area code: 814
- FIPS code: 42-049-02336
- Website: amityeriecounty.com

Amity Township is a township in Erie County, Pennsylvania, United States. The population was 983 at the 2020 census. There are no longer any boroughs or villages in the township, after the disappearance of Arbuckle and Hatch Hollow. The latter was the birthplace of famed muckraker Ida M. Tarbell, who was born in her grandfather's log cabin in Hatch Hollow in 1857.

== Geography ==
Amity Township is in southeastern Erie County. According to the U.S. Census Bureau, it has a total area of 28.2 square miles (73.0 km^{2}), of which 28.0 square miles (72.6 km^{2}) is land and 0.2 square miles (0.4 km^{2}), or 0.55%, is water. French Creek flows through the township, impounded by Union City Dam in neighboring Waterford Township.

== Demographics ==
Historical population
Census	Pop.	Note	%±
2000	1,140		—
2010	1,073		−5.9%
2020	983		−8.4%
2024 (est.)	977		−0.6%
U.S. Decennial Census

As of the census of 2000, there were 1,140 people, 387 households, and 315 families residing in the township. The population density was 40.3 inhabitants per square mile (15.6/km^{2}). There were 408 housing units at an average density of 14.4/sq mi (5.6/km^{2}). The racial makeup of the township was 99.30% White, 0.09% African American, 0.35% from other races, and 0.26% from two or more races. Hispanic or Latino of any race were 0.61% of the population.

There were 387 households, out of which 37.7% had children under the age of 18 living with them, 69.5% were married couples living together, 5.7% had a female householder with no husband present, and 18.6% were non-families. 13.4% of all households were made up of individuals, and 6.5% had someone living alone who was 65 years of age or older. The average household size was 2.94 and the average family size was 3.19.

In the township the population was spread out, with 28.7% under the age of 18, 6.3% from 18 to 24, 28.5% from 25 to 44, 26.0% from 45 to 64, and 10.5% who were 65 years of age or older. The median age was 36 years. For every 100 females, there were 106.1 males. For every 100 females age 18 and over, there were 105.3 males.

The median income for a household in the township was $42,569, and the median income for a family was $44,861. Males had a median income of $32,375 versus $21,125 for females. The per capita income for the township was $15,186. About 6.6% of families and 10.9% of the population were below the poverty line, including 13.0% of those under age 18 and 4.9% of those age 65 or over.
