= Venango Township, Erie County, Pennsylvania =

Township in Pennsylvania, US

Coordinates: 42°03′00″N 79°49′59″W

Venango Township
- Township
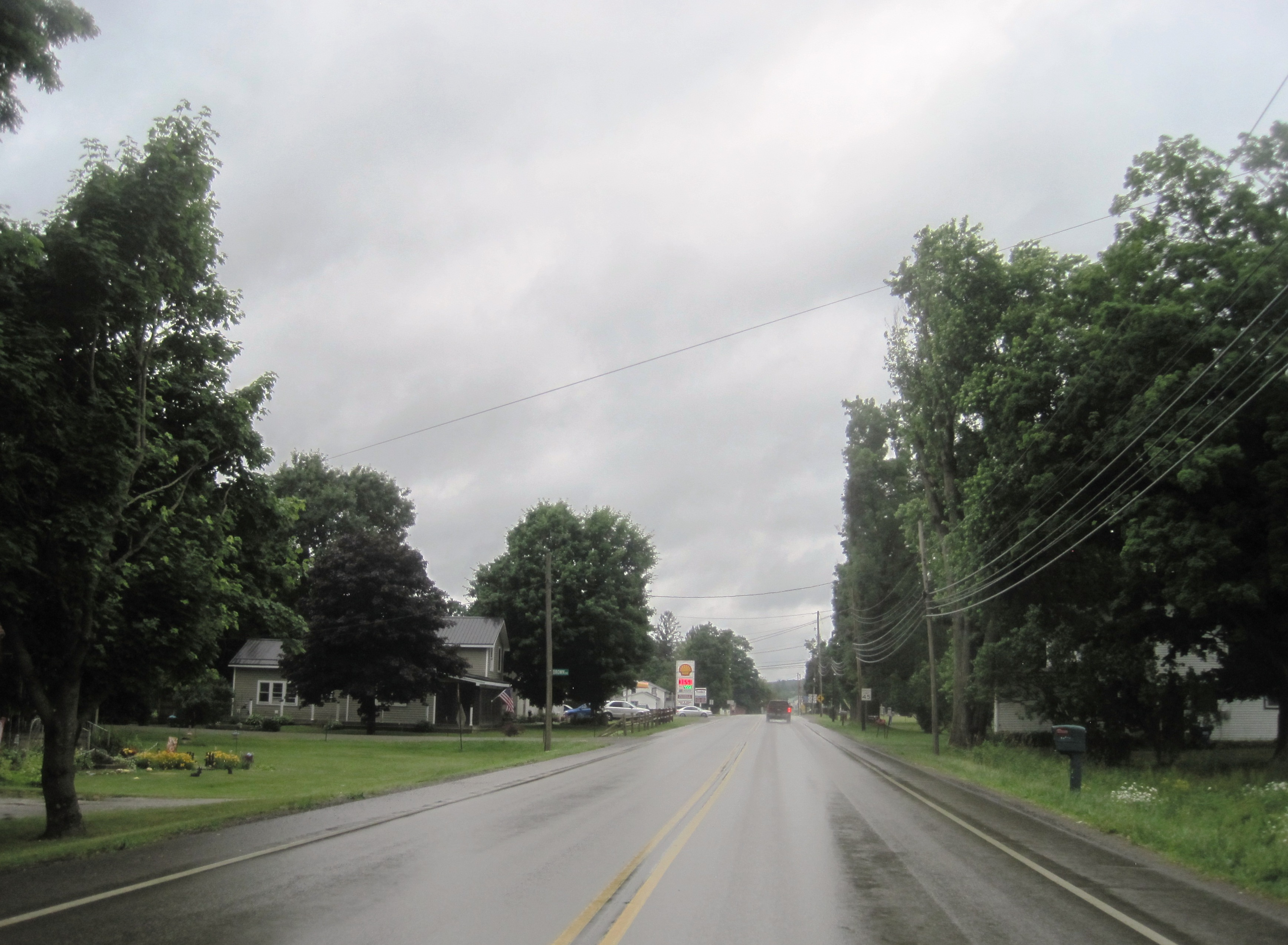
- PA 8/PA 89 in the Venango Township of Lowville

- Location in Erie County and the U.S. state of Pennsylvania
- Country: United States
- State: Pennsylvania
- County: Erie

Area
  - Total: 43.80 sq mi (113.44 km^{2})
  - Land: 43.42 sq mi (112.46 km^{2})
  - Water: 0.37 sq mi (0.97 km^{2})

Population (2020)
  - Total: 2,253
  - Estimate (2023): 2,225
  - Density: 52.8/sq mi (20.39/km^{2})
- Time zone: UTC-4 (EST)
  - Summer (DST): UTC-5 (EDT)
- Area code: 814
- FIPS code: 42-049-79928
- Website: https://venangotwp.com/

Venango Township is a township in Erie County, Pennsylvania, United States. The population was 2,253 at the 2020 census,

== Geography ==
The township is on the eastern edge of Erie County, bordered to the east by Chautauqua County, New York. The borough of Wattsburg is along the southern edge of the township.

According to the United States Census Bureau, the township has a total area of 43.8 square miles (113.4 km^{2}), of which 43.4 square miles (112.5 km^{2}) is land and 0.39 square miles (1.0 km^{2}), or 0.86%, water. The West Branch French Creek flows from north to south across the center of the township, joining the main stem of French Creek, which crosses the southeastern corner of the township, at Wattsburg. Two tributaries to West Branch French Creek, Bailey Brook and Alder Brook begin in Venango Township and one, Townley Run, ends in the township. Lake Pleasant, a glacial lake, and its outlet are located in this township.

== Demographics ==
Historical population
Census	Pop.	Note	%±
2000	2,277		—
2010	2,297		0.9%
2020	2,253		−1.9%
2023 (est.)	2,225		−1.2%
U.S. Decennial Census

As of the census of 2000, there were 2,277 people, 771 households, and 637 families residing in the township. The population density was 52.3 inhabitants per square mile (20.2/km^{2}). There were 821 housing units at an average density of 18.8/sq mi (7.3/km^{2}). The racial makeup of the township was 98.99% White, 0.09% African American, 0.09% Native American, 0.44% Asian, and 0.40% from two or more races. Hispanic or Latino of any race were 0.22% of the population.

There were 771 households, out of which 43.5% had children under the age of 18 living with them, 72.2% were married couples living together, 5.1% had a female householder with no husband present, and 17.3% were non-families. 14.3% of all households were made up of individuals, and 5.3% had someone living alone who was 65 years of age or older. The average household size was 2.95 and the average family size was 3.26.

In the township the population was spread out, with 29.6% under the age of 18, 7.8% from 18 to 24, 30.1% from 25 to 44, 25.3% from 45 to 64, and 7.3% who were 65 years of age or older. The median age was 36 years. For every 100 females, there were 101.1 males. For every 100 females age 18 and over, there were 103.8 males.

The median income for a household in the township was $50,882, and the median income for a family was $55,357. Males had a median income of $39,022 versus $27,059 for females. The per capita income for the township was $18,653. About 2.5% of families and 3.7% of the population were below the poverty line, including 2.6% of those under age 18 and 9.9% of those age 65 or over.
