= Clymer, New York =

- Town
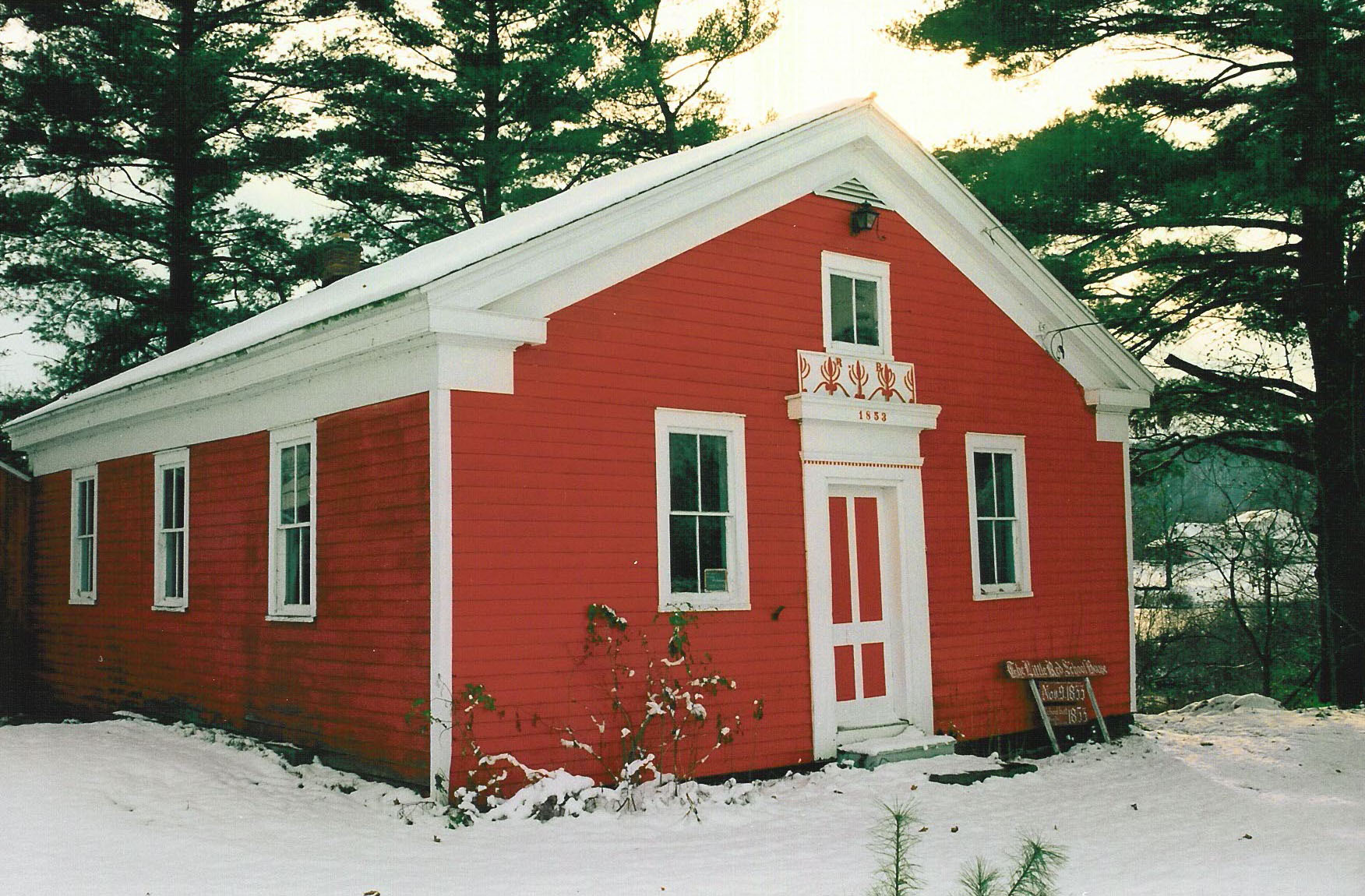
- Little Red Schoolhouse in 1997

- Location within Chautauqua County and New York state

- Location within New York Location within the United States
- Coordinates: 42°2′7″N 79°35′17″W
- Country: United States
- State: New York
- County: Chautauqua

Government
  - Type: Town council
  - Town supervisor: Brian Willink
  - Town council: Members' list: • John M. Holthouse (); • Norman H. Upperman (R); • Travis Heiser (R); • Russell A. Hunink ()

Area
  - Total: 36.16 sq mi (93.66 km^{2})
  - Land: 36.07 sq mi (93.42 km^{2})
  - Water: 0.093 sq mi (.24 km^{2})
- Elevation: 1,480 ft (451 m)

Population (2020)
  - Total: 1,748
  - Estimate (2021): 1,756
  - Density: 45.9/sq mi (17.73/km^{2})
- Time zone: UTC-5 (Eastern (EST))
  - Summer (DST): UTC-4 (EDT)
- ZIP Codes: 14724 (Clymer); 14767 (Panama)
- Area code: 716
- FIPS code: 36-013-16595
- GNIS feature ID: 0978842
- Website: www.townofclymerny.gov

Clymer is a town in Chautauqua County, New York, United States. The population was 1,748 at the 2020 census. The town is named for George Clymer, a signer of the Declaration of Independence. Clymer is located in the southwest part of the county.

== History ==
Settlement began circa 1820. The town of Clymer was established in 1821 from a division of the town of Chautauqua. In 1824, a division of Clymer was made to form the new town of Mina and again in 1829 to form the town of French Creek. In 1915, the population of Clymer was 1,341.

Neckers Co., a general store, has occupied the northwest corner of the main intersection in town since 1910, passing through four generations of the Neckers family.

The Clymer District School No. 5 was listed on the National Register of Historic Places in 1994.

On or about September 24, 2012, Clymer Central School superintendent Keith Reed Jr. was shot to death by an apparent murderer on his property near Clymer.

This town is known for a Dutch heritage that's personified throughout with the placement of artificial windmills and other decorations.

Clymer has been a dry town since 1974.

== Geography ==
According to the United States Census Bureau, the town has a total area of 36.2 square miles (93.7 km^{2}), of which 36.1 square miles (93.4 km^{2}) is land and 0.08 square miles (0.2 km^{2}), or 0.26%, is water.

New York State Route 474 passes through the town and intersects New York State Route 76 in North Clymer.

=== Adjacent towns and regions ===
Clymer borders Wayne Township, Erie County, Pennsylvania, and Columbus Township, Warren County, Pennsylvania, to the south. The town of French Creek is to the west and the town of Harmony is to the east. The town of Sherman is north of Clymer.

== Demographics ==
Historical population
Census	Pop.	Note	%±
1830	567		—
1840	909		60.3%
1850	1,127		24.0%
1860	1,330		18.0%
1870	1,486		11.7%
1880	1,455		−2.1%
1890	1,363		−6.3%
1900	1,229		−9.8%
1910	1,164		−5.3%
1920	1,205		3.5%
1930	1,181		−2.0%
1940	1,244		5.3%
1950	1,421		14.2%
1960	1,377		−3.1%
1970	1,352		−1.8%
1980	1,484		9.8%
1990	1,474		−0.7%
2000	1,501		1.8%
2010	1,698		13.1%
2020	1,748		2.9%
2021 (est.)	1,756		0.5%
U.S. Decennial Census

As of the census of 2000, there were 1,501 people, 502 households, and 400 families residing in the town. The population density was 41.6 inhabitants per square mile (16.1/km^{2}). There were 550 housing units at an average density of 15.3 per square mile (5.9/km^{2}). The racial makeup of the town was 99.13% White, 0.07% African American, 0.13% Native American, 0.27% Asian, 0.20% from other races, and 0.20% from two or more races. Hispanic or Latino of any race were 0.47% of the population.

There were 502 households, out of which 39.6% had children under the age of 18 living with them, 72.3% were married couples living together, 4.4% had a female householder with no husband present, and 20.3% were non-families. 17.5% of all households were made up of individuals, and 9.2% had someone living alone who was 65 years of age or older. The average household size was 2.99 and the average family size was 3.40.

In the town, the population was spread out, with 32.3% under the age of 18, 7.7% from 18 to 24, 27.6% from 25 to 44, 19.1% from 45 to 64, and 13.3% who were 65 years of age or older. The median age was 33 years. For every 100 females, there were 99.9 males. For every 100 females age 18 and over, there were 101.6 males.

The median income for a household in the town was $34,583, and the median income for a family was $38,654. Males had a median income of $30,000 versus $22,813 for females. The per capita income for the town was $13,710. 12.1% of the population and 9.0% of families were below the poverty line. Out of the total population, 17.3% of those under the age of 18 and 6.6% of those 65 and older were living below the poverty line.

== Notable people ==
- Charles F. Amidon, federal judge
- Loren B. Sessions, former US congressman
- Jehuu Caulcrick, former Michigan State fullback and NFL player; attended Clymer Central School

== Communities and locations in Clymer ==
- Clymer – The hamlet of Clymer is in the southwest corner of the town by the junction of State Route 474 and County Road 15. The Pennsylvania border lies 1.5 miles (2.4 km) miles to the south and 6.75 miles (10.86 km) to the west of the center of the hamlet.
- Clymer Center – A hamlet at the junction of County Road 10 and State Route 474 near the Little Red Schoolhouse in the middle of the town.
- Clymer Hill – A hamlet in the northwest part of the town, west of Clymer Center.
- Jaquins – A hamlet east of Clymer.
- Kings Corners – A location at the junction of County Roads 10 and 23 at the eastern town line.
- North Clymer – A hamlet at the junction of NY Route 474 and State Route 76 near the north town line. North Clymer was home to its own post office, ZIP code 14759, until May 24, 1997.
- Wickwire Corners – A location formed by the intersection of Wickwire Road and State Route 474, east of North Clymer.
