= Wattsburg, Pennsylvania =

Borough in Pennsylvania, US

- Borough
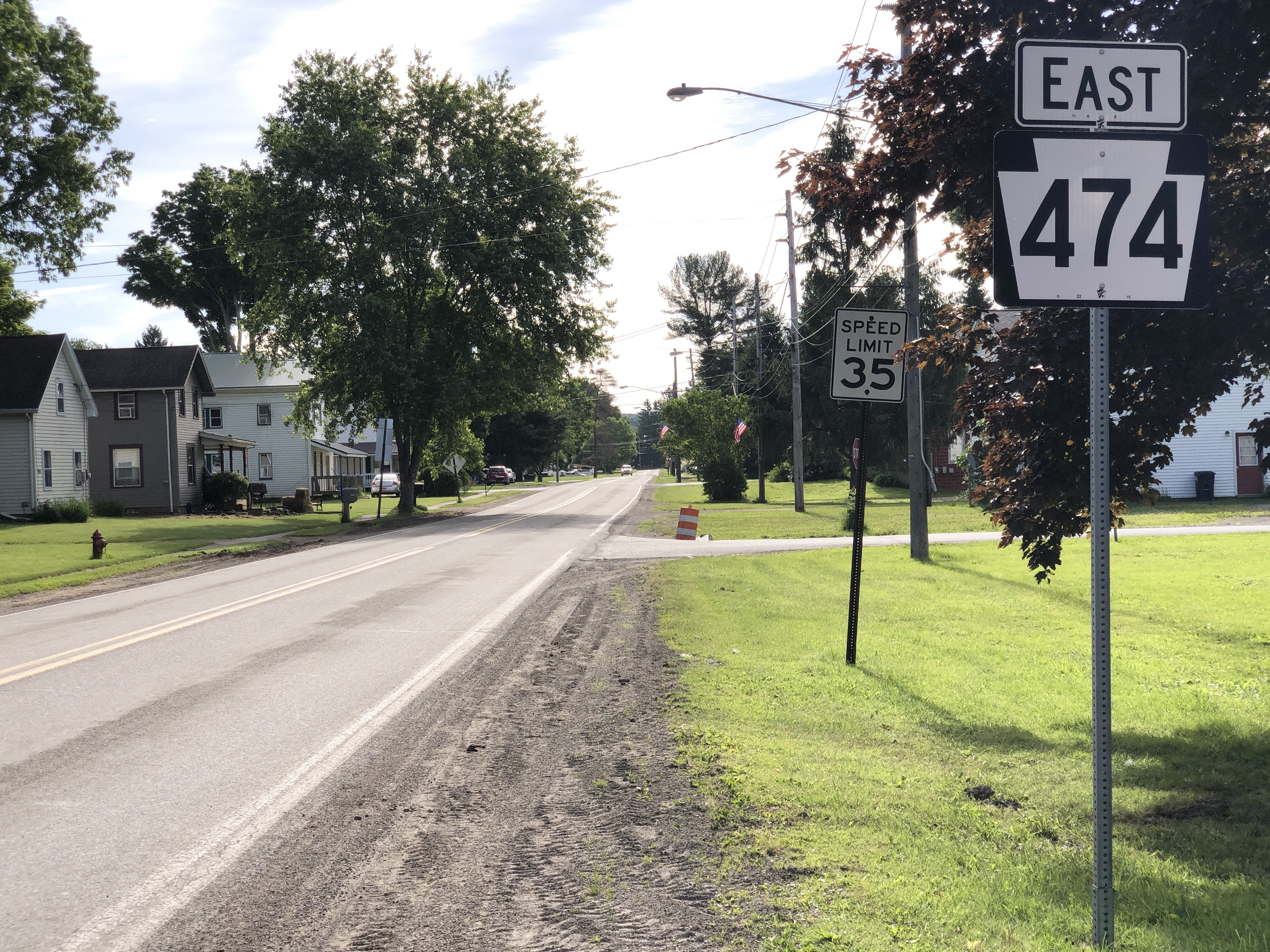
- PA 474 (Jamestown Street) in Wattsburg

- Location in Erie County and the U.S. state of Pennsylvania.
- Coordinates: 42°0′10″N 79°48′34″W
- Country: United States
- State: Pennsylvania
- County: Erie

Area
  - Total: 0.31 sq mi (0.80 km^{2})
  - Land: 0.30 sq mi (0.77 km^{2})
  - Water: 0.012 sq mi (0.03 km^{2})
- Elevation (Borough benchmark): 1,286 ft (392 m)
- Highest elevation (northeast end of borough): 1,300 ft (400 m)
- Lowest elevation (French Creek): 1,278 ft (390 m)

Population (2020)
  - Total: 353
  - Density: 1,186/sq mi (457.9/km^{2})
- Time zone: UTC-4 (EST)
  - Summer (DST): UTC-5 (EDT)
- ZIP code: 16442
- Area code: 814
- FIPS code: 42-81648

Wattsburg is a borough in Erie County, Pennsylvania, United States. The population was 352 at the 2020 census. It is part of the Erie Metropolitan Statistical Area.

== History ==
Incorporated in 1833, Wattsburg was once a thriving stagecoach center.

== Geography ==
Wattsburg is bordered to the west, north, and east by Venango Township, and to the south by Amity Township. The New York state border is 2.5 miles (4.0 km) to the east.

According to the United States Census Bureau, the borough has a total area of 0.31 square miles (0.8 km^{2}), of which 0.01 square miles (0.03 km^{2}), or 3.72%, is water. Wattsburg is at the junction of French Creek with its West Branch. The borough is in the Allegheny River watershed.

== Demographics ==
Historical population
Census	Pop.	Note	%±
1840	131		—
1850	227		73.3%
1860	329		44.9%
1870	286		−13.1%
1880	389		36.0%
1890	382		−1.8%
1900	351		−8.1%
1910	283		−19.4%
1920	232		−18.0%
1930	256		10.3%
1940	290		13.3%
1950	343		18.3%
1960	401		16.9%
1970	453		13.0%
1980	513		13.2%
1990	486		−5.3%
2000	378		−22.2%
2010	403		6.6%
2020	353		−12.4%
2021 (est.)	349	▼	−1.1%
U.S. Decennial Census

As of the census of 2000, there were 378 people, 148 households, and 97 families residing in the borough. The population density was 1,160.8 inhabitants per square mile (448.2/km^{2}). There were 166 housing units at an average density of 509.8 per square mile (196.8/km^{2}). The racial makeup of the borough was 99.47% White, 0.26% from other races, and 0.26% from two or more races. Hispanic or Latino of any race were 0.53% of the population.

There were 148 households, out of which 30.4% had children under the age of 18 living with them, 45.9% were married couples living together, 14.2% had a female householder with no husband present, and 33.8% were non-families. 26.4% of all households were made up of individuals, and 8.8% had someone living alone who was 65 years of age or older. The average household size was 2.55 and the average family size was 3.13.

In the borough the population was spread out, with 24.6% under the age of 18, 10.6% from 18 to 24, 29.6% from 25 to 44, 23.8% from 45 to 64, and 11.4% who were 65 years of age or older. The median age was 35 years. For every 100 females there were 92.9 males. For every 100 females age 18 and over, there were 96.6 males.

The median income for a household in the borough was $32,500, and the median income for a family was $37,813. Males had a median income of $29,250 versus $25,156 for females. The per capita income for the borough was $14,830. About 17.6% of families and 17.9% of the population were below the poverty line, including 16.2% of those under age 18 and 51.4% of those age 65 or over.

== Notable residents ==
- Luther B. Nims, politician

== See also ==
- WERI (FM)
