= Tioga High School =

Tioga Senior High School or Tioga High School may refer to:

- Tioga High School (California), Groveland, California
- Tioga High School (Louisiana), Tioga, Louisiana
- Tioga Central High School, Tioga Center, New York
- Tioga High School (North Dakota), Tioga, North Dakota
- Tioga High School (Texas), Tioga, Texas
