= List of county routes in Tioga County, New York =

County routes in Tioga County, New York, are signed with the Manual on Uniform Traffic Control Devices-standard yellow-on-blue pentagon shield. Even numbered routes are east–west in direction, while odd numbered routes are north–south. County routes in Tioga County are also assigned section numbers based on town. The second and third digits are the same for each road name on a given route, but the first digit varies by town. Routes in the town of Barton, the first of nine towns alphabetically in Tioga County, have section numbers beginning with "1" while routes in the town of Tioga, the last alphabetically, have section numbers beginning with "9". Routes in the other seven towns—Berkshire, Candor, Newark Valley, Nichols, Owego, Richford, and Spencer—have section numbers beginning with "2" through "8", respectively. The section numbers, listed below as CH #, exist solely for inventory purposes and are not posted.

== Route list ==
Route	Length (mi)	Length (km)	From	Via	To	Notes
CR 1	1.97	3.17	NY 34 / NY 96	Michigan Hollow Road (CH 803) in Spencer	Tompkins County line (becomes CR 187)	
CR 2	2.02	3.25	Poole Road / Stone Quarry Road in Barton	Hamilton Valley Road (CH 105 and CH 905)	CR 7 in Tioga	
CR 3	7.45	11.99	NY 34 in Barton	Dean Creek Road (CH 102 and 802)	CR 18 in Spencer	
CR 4	5.92	9.53	Pennsylvania state line	West River Drive (CH 501) in Nichols	NY 282	Formerly part of NY 283 from 1930 to 1949
CR 5	3.33	5.36	NY 96	Crumtown Road (CH 804) in Spencer	Tompkins County line (becomes CR 125)	
CR 6	5.84	9.40	NY 282	East River Drive (CH 502) in Nichols	Dead end	Formerly part of NY 283 from 1930 to 1970
CR 7	13.35	21.48	NY 17C in Tioga	Halsey Valley Road (CH 101, CH 801, and CH 901)	NY 96 in Spencer	Formerly NY 225 from 1930 to the late 1940s
CR 8	3.70	5.95	CR 33	Glen Road (CH 203) in Berkshire	NY 38	
CR 9	10.84	17.45	NY 17C in Barton	Ellis Creek Road (CH 103 and CH 903)	CR 7 in Tioga	
CR 10 (1)	2.50	4.02	NY 38	East Berkshire Road (CH 202) in Berkshire	CR 37	
CR 10 (2)	1.18	1.90	Waverly village line	Broad Street Extension (CH 107) and North Ellistown Road (CH 108) in Barton	NY 17C	Former number; renumbered to CR 12
CR 11	6.10	9.82	Barton Road in Barton	Oak Hill Road (CH 104 and CH 904)	CR 9 in Tioga	
CR 12	1.18	1.90	Waverly village line	Broad Street Extension (CH 107) and North Ellistown Road (CH 108) in Barton	NY 17C	
CR 14	6.14	9.88	NY 17C	Day Hollow Road (CH 605) in Owego	Broome County line (becomes CR 60)	
CR 15	2.30	3.70	NY 96B	Coddington (CH 301) Roads in Candor	Tompkins County line (becomes CR 119)	
CR 16	0.32	0.51	NY 96B	Willseyville Road (CH 303) in Candor	CR 15	Formerly designated CR 15B
CR 17			NY 96B / NY 960H	Honeypot Road (CH 305) in Candor	0.1 miles (0.2 km) south of Blinn Road	Former number
CR 17	0.77	1.24	Hunts Creek Road	Berry Road in Nichols	Stanton Hill Road	
CR 18	2.68	4.31	Chemung County line (becomes CR 46)	Sabin Road (CH 806) in Spencer	NY 96	
CR 19	1.03	1.66	Owego village line	Taylor Road (CH 606) in Owego	Barnes Creek Road	
CR 20	1.26	2.03	Barnes Creek Road	Bodle Hill Road (CH 606) in Owego	CR 14	
CR 21	8.75	14.08	CR 7 in Tioga	Straits Corners Road (CH 902 and CH 302)	NY 96 in Candor	
CR 23	5.65	9.09	NY 17C	Glen Mary Road (CH 906) in Tioga	NY 96	
CR 25	4.57	7.35	Sibley Road	Sulphur Springs Road and Southside Drive (CH 503 and CH 603) in Owego	NY 96 at NY 17 exit 64	Southside Drive portion was formerly part of NY 283 from 1930 to 1970
CR 27	7.70	12.39	Pennsylvania state line	Montrose Turnpike (CH 610) in Owego	Owego village line	
CR 29	1.02	1.64	Tompkins County line (becomes CR 117)	Harford Road (CH 702) in Richford	Tompkins County line (becomes CR 117)	
CR 33 (1)	10.04	16.16	NY 38 in Owego	West Creek Road (CH 608, CH 408, and CH 308)	Tompkins County line in Candor (becomes CR 115)	
CR 33 (2)	3.96	6.37	Tompkins County line in Berkshire (becomes CR 115M)	West Creek Road (CH 208 and CH 708)	NY 79 in Richford	
CR 37	5.38	8.66	NY 38 in Newark Valley	Wilson Creek Road (CH 401 and CH 201)	CR 10 in Berkshire	
CR 39	5.88	9.46	CR 14	Gaskill Road (CH 607) in Owego	NY 38	
CR 41	5.75	9.25	Pennsylvania state line (becomes PA 858)	Pennsylvania Avenue (CH 601) in Owego	NY 434	
CR 43 (1)	0.51	0.82	NY 17C	Goodrich Road (CH 903) in Tioga	CR 23	
CR 43 (2)	0.09	0.14	NY 17C	East leg of wye connection in Tioga	CR 43 (segment 1)	
CR 54	3.22	5.18	CR 6	Stanton Hill Road (CH 509) in Nichols	CR 25	
CR 60	0.33	0.53	Chemung County line (becomes CR 60)	Chemung Street (CH 106) in Barton	Waverly village line	Former routing of NY 17
CR 65	0.50	0.80	Dead end	Corporate Drive (CH 609) in Owego	NY 38	

== See also ==
- County routes in New York
- List of former state routes in New York (201–300)
