= New York State Route 282 =

State highway in Tioga County, New York, US

New York State Route 282
- Map of Tioga County and vicinity with NY 282 highlighted in red

Route information
- Maintained by NYSDOT
- Length: 3.48 mi (5.60 km)
- Existed: 1930–present

Major junctions
- South end: PA 187 at the Pennsylvania state line in Nichols
- I-86 / NY 17 / Southern Tier Expressway in Nichols
- North end: NY 17C in Tioga

Location
- Country: United States
- State: New York
- Counties: Tioga

Highway system
- New York Highways; Interstate; US; State; Reference; Parkways
← NY 281	→ NY 283

New York State Route 282 (NY 282) is a north–south state highway located within Tioga County in the Southern Tier of New York in the United States. It extends for 3.48 miles (5.60 km) from the Pennsylvania state line in the town of Nichols, where it connects to Pennsylvania Route 187 (PA 187), to an intersection with NY 17C in the town of Tioga. The route meets Interstate 86 (I-86) and crosses over the Susquehanna River just west of the village of Nichols.

NY 282 originally served the hamlet of Smithboro on the northern riverbank via a toll bridge when it was assigned as part of the 1930 renumbering of state highways in New York. The route south of the junction with former NY 283 was reconstructed during 1964 and 1965 while NY 282 was realigned in January 1969 to cross the river on a new bridge to the east of Smithboro as part of construction of the Southern Tier Expressway between Nichols and Owego.

== Route description ==
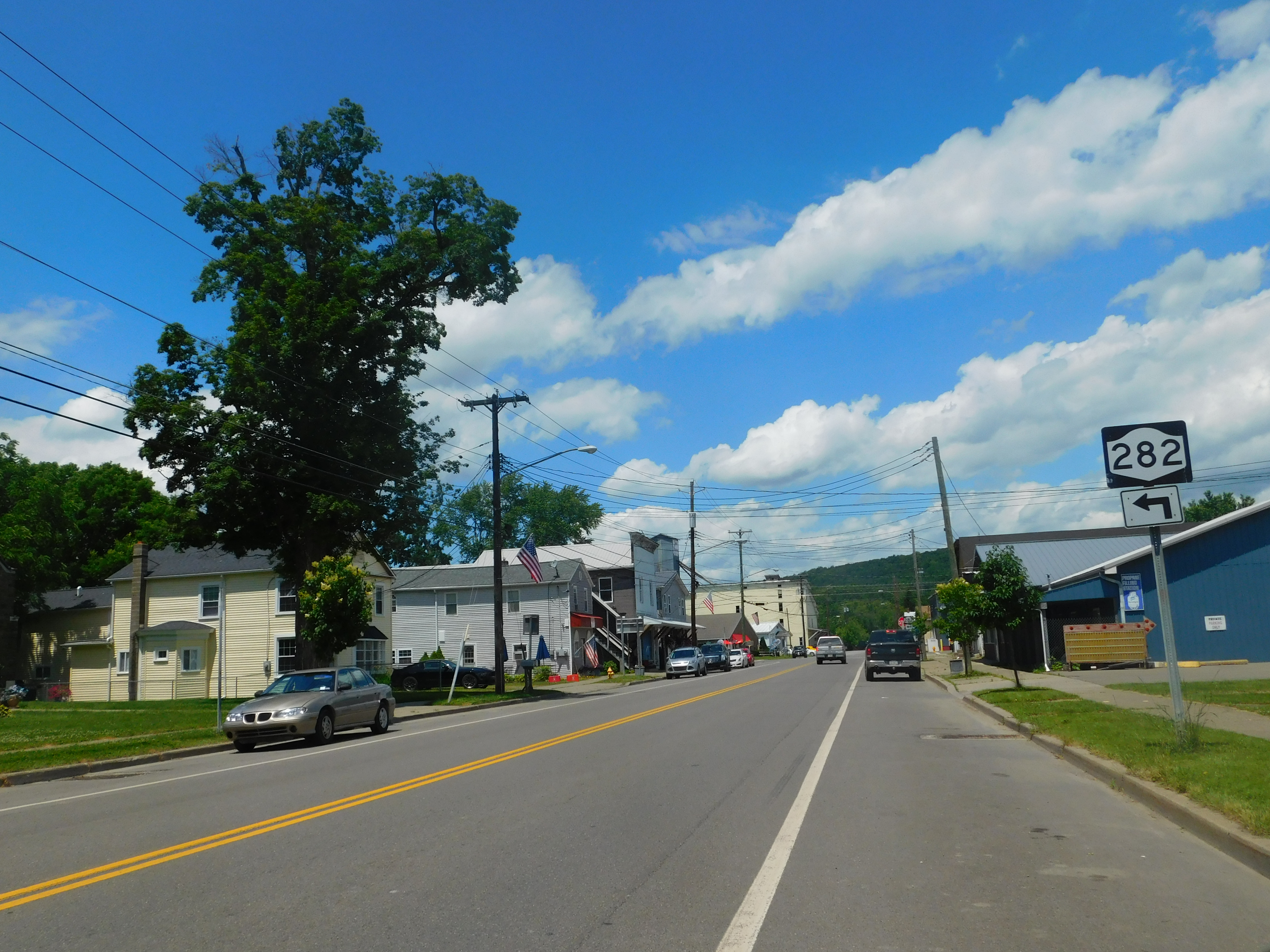
NY 282 in downtown Nichols

NY 282 begins at the Pennsylvania state line in the town of Nichols, where it connects to PA 187. The route heads to the northwest as a two-lane road, loosely paralleling Wappasening Creek as it passes farmland in the base of a valley surrounding the creek. It crosses over the creek and serves little more than farms on its way into the village of Nichols, where the open fields give way to residential neighborhoods and NY 282 becomes known as Main Street. After two blocks, the highway enters Nichols' central business district, where it intersects with County Route 6 (CR 6, named River Street), a highway once designated as NY 283. NY 282 turns west at the junction, following West River Street through another residential section of the village to Nichols' western village limits, where the street name changes to West River Road.

Just outside the village limits, the line of homes ends at an interchange with the eastbound side of I-86/NY 17. The route briefly continues west through a commercialized area of the town of Nichols, running parallel to the expressway before turning north onto an unnamed highway crossing over the Susquehanna River. At this point, West River Road becomes CR 4. Heading away from the river road, NY 282 passes under the expressway and connects to its westbound direction before crossing the river and entering the town of Tioga. It immediately passes over the Norfolk Southern Railway's Southern Tier Line on the northern riverbank before traversing a brief undeveloped area of rolling fields in the base of a valley surrounding the river. The open stretch ultimately leads to the route's end at an intersection with NY 17C on the northern edge of the valley.

== History ==
In late February 1922, Tioga County officials announced that employees in Albany placed a new state highway through the town of Nichols. This new route, 3.91 miles (6.29 km) long, would run from the Pennsylvania state line south of the village. This alignment would join Main Street in Nichols village, then make a left onto River Street until it reached the Smithboro bridge. From there, it would cross the Suquehanna River and join up with the Liberty Highway (future NY 17) in the hamlet of Smithboro. The road would be paid for under a 74–26% divide of state and county funds. This would cost Tioga County $31,591, most of which would come from a bond issue. Some property would need to be acquired near Smithboro to build the new state highway, which would also see its value go up with the proposed road. The Tioga County Board of Supervisors approved the new road on February 25 at a special meeting.

On April 27, 1922, the state of New York awarded a contract to rebuild a 4-mile (6.4 km) highway connecting the Pennsylvania state line south of the village of Nichols to the Smithboro. The project was 98 percent done by the end of 1922 and completed by 1926. Upon completion, the road was added to the state highway system as unsigned State Highway 1615 (SH 1615). In the 1930 renumbering of state highways in New York, hundreds of state-maintained highways were assigned posted route numbers for the first time. One of these was SH 1615, which was designated as NY 282.

=== Smithboro toll bridge ===
The alignment of NY 282 between Smithboro and Hoopers Valley originally followed a ferry across the Susquehanna River, dating back to the 18th century, opened by two local entrepreneurs. The ferry was replaced by one opened in 1811 by Caleb Lyons, followed by a wire ferry in 1842 constructed by Colonel William Ransom. On April 18, 1829, the Smithboro and Nichols Bridge Company, with Isaac Boardman, Nehemiah Platt, and John Coryell appointed as commissioners of the new company. The first of the bridges was constructed shortly after the bridge company was improved, but washed away the next spring. In March 1865, the second bridge at the site was constructed, only to be blown apart by a gale in October. After being reconstructed in forty days after the gale incident, the bridge would be demolished when a span of a bridge in Owego village crashed upon the structure. The bridge was rebuilt once again, and survived until 1880, when it was washed away again. This bridge was replaced by a rope ferry to cross the structure. The second of two bridge companies was chartered on June 9, 1899 across the river with a capital stock of $30,000 (1899 USD). This new bridge would be private for 50 years after it would be constructed, with its charter expiring in June 1949. The bridge, constructed by the Groton Bridge Company, was completed in 1899 and contained a toll of 25¢ to cross, covering the return trip.

The Smithboro toll bridge opened to traffic on June 28, 1900. A formal ceremony was held that day with several local dignitaries attending. Barnum Williams of the Groton Bridge Company presented the bridge on a form basis to the president of the toll company, William Lawrence. Judge Murray Poole of Ithaca noted that he was rejoicing in having the best bridge across the Susquehanna River for a 100-mile (160 km) span. The judge invited the Erie Railroad to build a switch and tracks onto the bridge to prove its strength. After the procession it was announced that the bridge would free to traffic for the first six months.

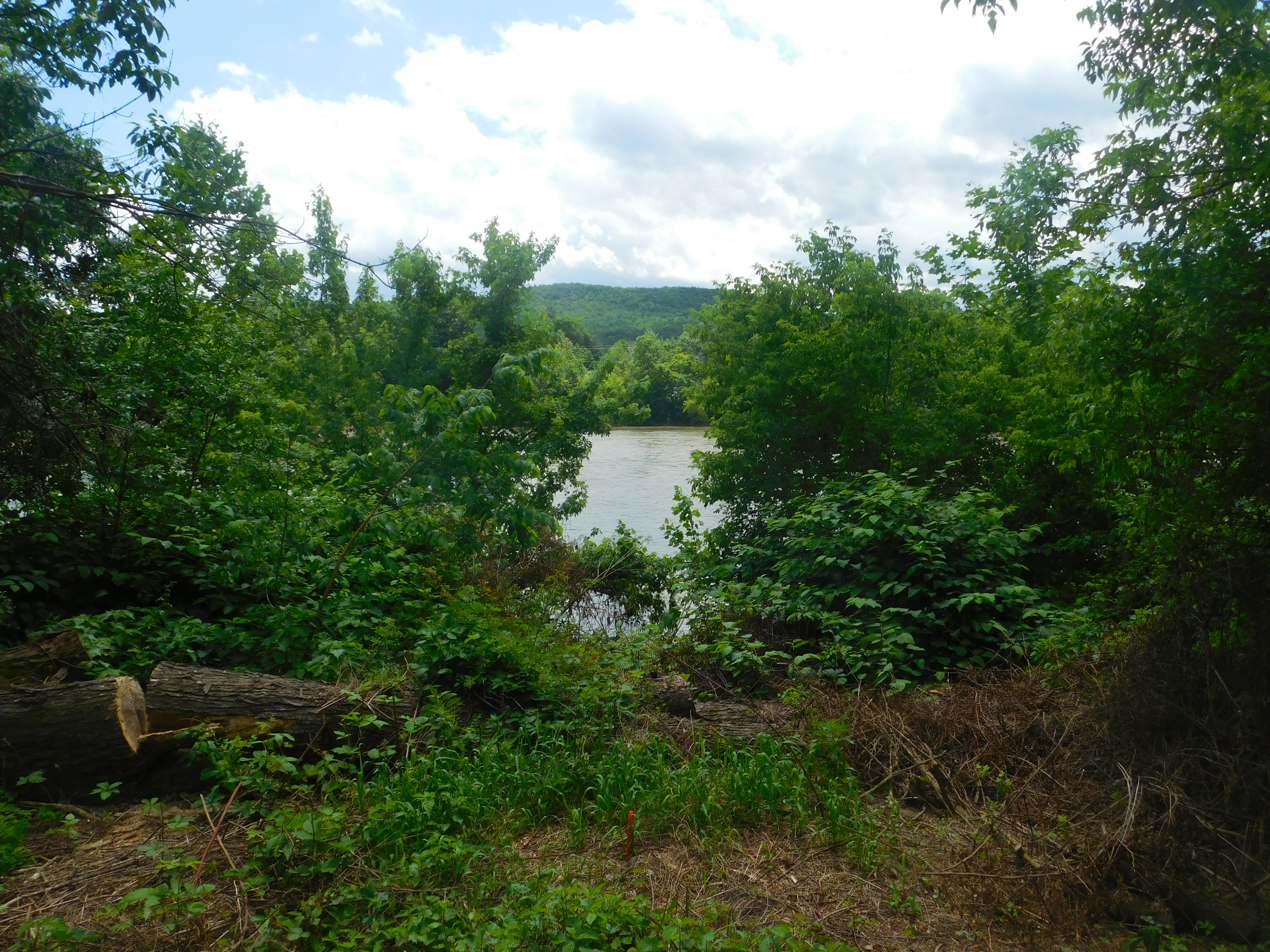
The former site of the Smithboro–Nichols Toll Bridge in June 2017

Attempts to purchase the bridge from the toll company were numerous in the 1930s and 1940s. A bill was defeated in 1931 by Governor of New York Franklin Delano Roosevelt that would have authorized the state to investigate purchasing the bridge. Roosevelt vetoed the bill, stating that the New York State Department of Public Works can choose to investigate without a legislated act. The state made an effort in 1933 which was unsuccessful. In 1937, the village of Waverly made an unsuccessful attempt to have the bridge bought by the state as part of construction of a road out of Waverly to improve connections. By July 1, 3,000 people had a signed a petition to have the structure purchased that would be delivered to Governor Thomas Dewey. The state declined the petition however, citing that the bridge company wanted too much money for the transaction.

In February 1948, State Senator Chauncey B. Hammond and State Assemblyman Myron Albro announced a bill that would authorize $30,000 to get the bridge purchased. The reasons for the bill was that the charter of the bridge company forbid any bridges being built in the area, which also led to delay the reconstruction of NY 17. The condition of the toll bridge, along with the fact that the structure was used by school buses, made it a priority to get the bill through. The bill, which passed both houses, was vetoed by Dewey because the section of NY 17 was just a concept and if the alignment was changed in the study phase, there is no reason to purchase the bridge.

On April 14, 1949, the state announced that Dewey had authorized the purchase of the structure, the last remaining privately owned toll bridge in New York State. As part of the deal, the state had through the end of the fiscal year (April 1, 1950) to use the money to acquire the bridge, at a cost of $30,000 or less. On June 14, 1949, two months after the appropriation, the state extended the charter through January 1, 1950 to work with negotiation of the transactions. In the time span of more than a year after the appropriation, negotiations were made for a fair purchase price to acquire the structure, which came to an amount of $26,000 by September 1950. As part of the purchase, the bridge would be made toll-free. However, the state was not able to acquire the structure until August 6, 1952, when the state officially took over, abandoning the toll. Albro, who was at a ceremony removing the sign denoting the toll, noted that there was multiple issues in the three-year span involving transfer of the bridge, such as titles of the approaches and miscellaneous technicalities.

In May 1953, the state announced that the bridge would need repairs costing $105,920 to replace the deck of the four-span, 680-foot-long (210 m) structure, along with repainting the bridge with three coast of paint as well as a deep cleaning. The state announced the bid would go to the Conn Welding and Machine Company of New Castle, Pennsylvania and be started by June with a slated completion date of December 1, 1953. The project was completed ahead of schedule and opened on October 26.

=== Nichols relocation ===
In July 1962, the state of New York proposed the relocation of NY 282 south of the village of Nichols. The project, proposed to cost $650,000, would involve reconstructing NY 282 for a 1.5-mile (2.4 km) stretch from the Pennsylvania state line to the corporation line of the village of Nichols. There would also be a section of the project reconstructing NY 282 through downtown Nichols to the junction with NY 283, a 0.5-mile (0.80 km) span. This project would involve straightening the roadway south of Nichols, with a new I-beam bridge constructed at the crossing of Wappasening Creek. A storm sewer would be installed along NY 282, which would also be widened from 16 feet (4.9 m) to 22 feet (6.7 m) south of the village and to 44 feet (13 m) in Nichols. The project would involve removing a former blacksmith shop, a residence next to the Wappasensing Creek bridge along with various pens and coops. 27 trees would also have to be removed along the alignment: 19 elms and eight maples that were in the process of dying from Dutch elm disease.

Opposition of the 60 residents who attended the public meeting on July 24, 1962 at Nichols Elementary School felt that the improvement of NY 282 was going to be dangerous for those who lived along the stretch. The contention felt that the relocation would bring drivers closer to houses. Residents also complained that Pennsylvania drivers coming off PA 187 were using NY 282 as a speedway and this new project would just make things worse. The residents proposed that the state focus on the relocation of NY 282 for a 0.4-mile (0.64 km) length stretch of the road between the Pennsylvania state line and the crossing of the Wappasening Creek. The state noted that they would investigate the possibility of a relocation but that it would involve the state of Pennsylvania in construction and cause issues of multiple state responsibility. Opponents also felt that the state was only doing this project more to focus on the construction of the Southern Tier Expressway, which would have a connection with NY 282. The opponents also noted that there was an unused property east of the road that would be acquirable and used at a cheaper price than the proposed project. The state rebutted, stating that since NY 282 was upgraded to a state highway in 1924, the road had never seen a reconstruction project and was a massive traffic hazard.

Despite the protests, the village of Nichols gained a $4,100 check to deposit as part of the connection of storm sewers along NY 282 for the project in May 1963. In October 1963, the state of New York announced the opening of bids on the project, which involved the construction of a 269.5-foot (82.1 m) bridge across Wappasening Creek, along with blacktopping the full 2-mile (3.2 km) stretch. The state totaled the project at around $644,000. The contract was given to the Dalrymple Gravel & Contracting Company at the cost of $603,667. The project was given a slated completion date of June 1, 1965.

=== Southern Tier Expressway and rail crossing controversy ===
In May 1962, the state of New York gave residents of Nichols a sneak preview at the proposed construction of the Southern Tier Expressway (NY 17). This sneak preview at Nichols Elementary School announced that two new interchanges would be constructed in the town of Nichols, one at the junction with Stanton Hill Road and one west of the village. As part of the Southern Tier construction, a new bridge across the Susquehanna River would be constructed to replace the one in downtown Smithboro. The mayor of Nichols, Donald Hunt, requested time to study the proposed location of the new bridge across the river, stating that one constructed east of the village would be more beneficial for residents. The state rebutted that the new bridge location was chosen because the river east of Nichols was wider and more prone to flooding.

In 1966, the relocation of NY 282 from Bridge Street in Smithboro was approved with the elimination of a grade crossing with the Lehigh Valley Railroad tracks. The project would also involve the elimination of the crossing on NY 282 of the Erie-Lackawanna Railway. On January 22, 1967, the state announced that they wished to update the proposed grade crossing elimination with local opposition exerting pressure because of new construction in the area. The New York State Department of Public Works now proposed that the elimination would still occur with the fact that NY 282 would end up being relocated eastward as part of construction of the Southern Tier Expressway, but that NY 282's old alignment would be open until a point south of the grade crossing so that access to a nearby house is not cut off, along with new houses being constructed in the area.

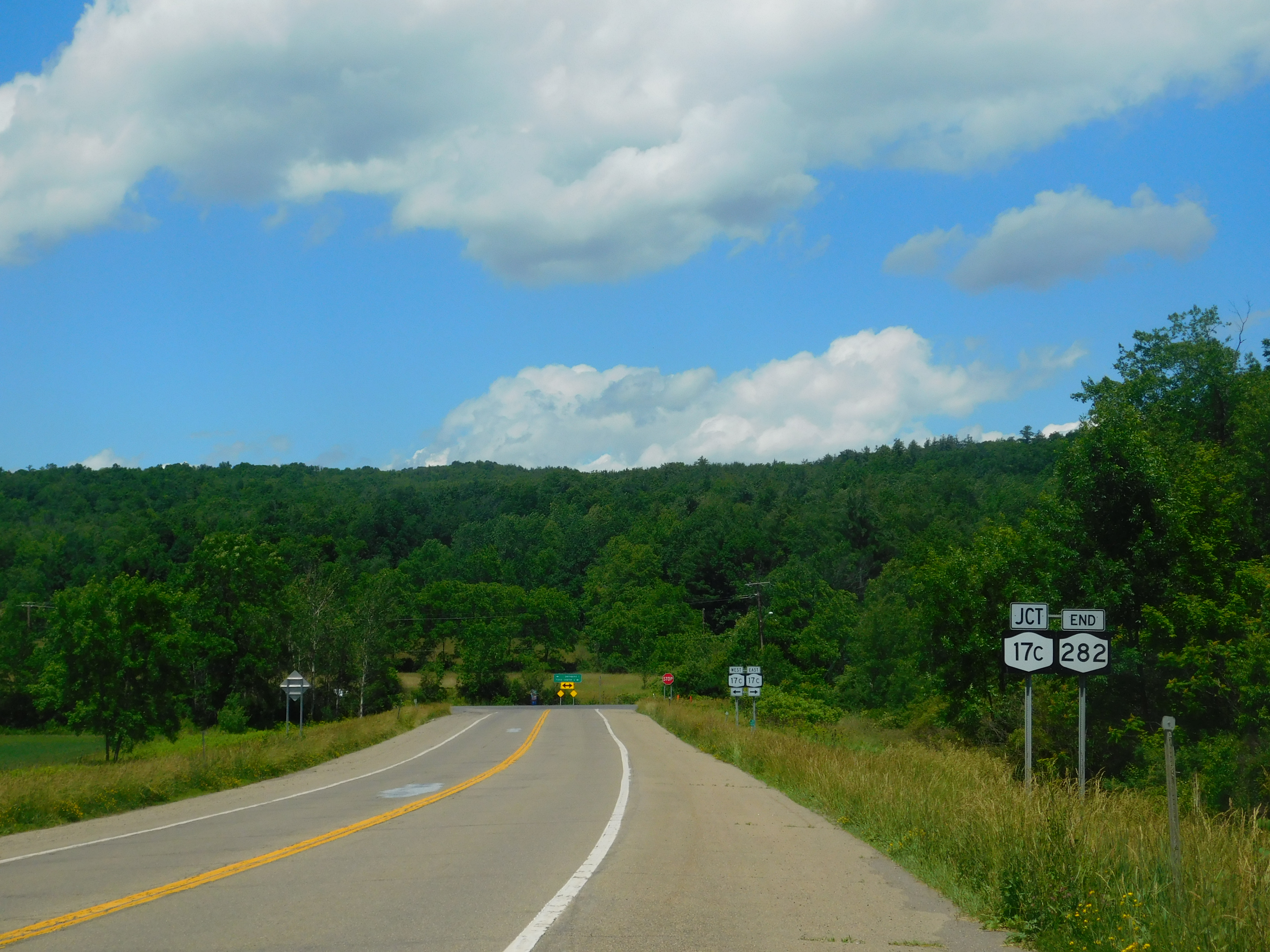
NY 282 approaching the junction with NY 17C in Smithboro

Just nine days prior to the grade crossing changes, Governor Nelson Rockefeller announced that bids would open on the construction of the new alignment of NY 17, the Southern Tier Expressway on February 16. The state announced that the amount would come out to $15.123 million for the new road, but half of that would be paid by Appalachia funds, while the state would pay for the rest. As part of the construction, a new, five-span, 720-foot-long (220 m) bridge across the Susquehanna River and Erie-Lackawanna Railroad tracks would be constructed. This new bridge would also involve a 0.5-mile (0.80 km) relocation of NY 282 to the east, while having the former toll bridge removed. In April 1967, the state of New York announced that the Perini Corporation of Framingham, Massachusetts, who was constructing a section of the expressway east of Owego village, won the bid of $11,706,225.10 to construct the new expressway, along with the relocated NY 282 with a slated completion date of December 1, 1969.

Preliminary work began in late April 1967 on the construction of the next segment of the Southern Tier Expressway. By June, construction through Nichols was visible, with construction of the interchange at Stanton Hill Road, along with draining pipes for construction of the new bridge across the Susquehanna River of NY 282. In January 1969, the state announced that the new bridge across the Susquehanna River would open on January 14, receiving its first traffic at 10 a.m. The road was opened early during construction of NY 17 to permit the demolition of the old toll bridge to go forward. The Perini firm took dynamite to the center span of the old bridge on February 6, 1969, with the eight charges causing the center spans to fall in the river.

NY 282's original alignment along the southern riverbank is now part of CR 4 while a small section in Smithboro is town-maintained and known as Bridge Street.

== Major intersections ==
The entire route is in Tioga County.

Location	mi	km	Destinations	Notes
Nichols	0.00	0.00	PA 187 south	Continuation into Pennsylvania
Village of Nichols	1.91	3.07	CR 6 (River Street)	Formerly part of NY 283
Nichols	2.61	4.20	I-86 east / NY 17 east / Southern Tier Expressway east – Owego, Binghamton	Exit 62 (NY 17)
Nichols	2.88	4.63	CR 4 (West River Road) – Tioga Downs	Formerly part of NY 282 until 1969
Nichols	2.96	4.76	I-86 west / NY 17 west / Southern Tier Expressway west – Waverly, Elmira	Exit 62 (NY 17)
Tioga	3.48	5.60	NY 17C – Smithboro, Tioga Center	Northern terminus
1.000 mi = 1.609 km; 1.000 km = 0.621 mi
