= New York State Route 17C =

State highway in New York, US

New York State Route 17C
- Map of the Southern Tier in New York with NY 17C highlighted in red

Route information
- Auxiliary route of NY 17
- Maintained by NYSDOT and the city of Binghamton
- Length: 40.34 mi (64.92 km)
- Existed: 1930–present

Major junctions
- West end: NY 34 in Waverly
- NY 96 in Owego; NY 26 in Endicott; Future I-86 / NY 17 in Union; NY 201 in Johnson City
- East end: US 11 in Binghamton

Location
- Country: United States
- State: New York
- Counties: Tioga, Broome

Highway system
- New York Highways; Interstate; US; State; Reference; Parkways
← NY 17B	→ NY 17D

New York State Route 17C (NY 17C) is a state highway in the Southern Tier of New York in the United States. Its western terminus is at an intersection with NY 34 in Waverly, Tioga County while its eastern terminus is at an intersection with U.S. Route 11 (US 11) in Binghamton, Broome County. The route runs concurrently with NY 96 for a block in Owego and for a few blocks with NY 26 in Endicott.

The stretch between Waverly and Owego is the former NY 17, as it was routed prior to the opening of the Southern Tier Expressway. The stretch from NY 96 to Binghamton is the original routing of NY 17C and serves as an alternate route between Owego and the Triple Cities. Through all three of the Triple Cities (Endicott, Johnson City, and Binghamton), NY 17C is named Main Street.

== Route description ==
=== Tioga County ===
==== Waverly to Tioga Center ====
NY 17C begins at an intersection with NY 34 (Cayuta Avenue) in the village of Waverly. NY 17C proceeds eastward away from NY 34 as a two-lane Chemung Street, crossing over a large creek, becoming a residential street to the east. Crossing over railroad tracks into the hamlet of East Waverly, the route becomes commercial, passing south of Dodge Pond. Dropping the Chemung Street moniker, NY 17C proceeds east out of East Waverly, crossing into the town of Barton, passing south of a large commercial strip and a former mobile home park. During this southeastern stretch, the route soon begins to parallel the Norfolk Southern-owned Southern Tier Line (ex-Erie Railroad tracks), becoming a two-lane residential street through Barton.

A short distance to the east, NY 17C begins a parallel with NY 17 (the Southern Tier Expressway) and the railroad tracks. NY 17C soon crosses an intersection with the southern terminus of County Route 9 (CR 9; Ellis Creek Road), entering the hamlet of Ellistown. Ellistown consists of several residences near the tracks, while NY 17C starts making a gradual bend to the northeast alongside the tracks and the Susquehanna River. Now proceeding northward, NY 17C parallels CR 9 far to the east, splitting away from the Southern Tier Line as it makes another bend to the east. After making the gradual bend, the route and railroad tracks enter the hamlet of Barton. In Barton, NY 17C intersects with CR 11 (Oak Hill Road).

After crossing through the hamlet of Barton, NY 17C and the tracks bend southeast once again, paralleling through the town of Barton. A short distance later, they cross into the town of Tioga and into the hamlet of Smithboro. In Smithboro, NY 17C and the Southern Tier split, with several buildings in the middle. NY 17C east through Smithboro is a two-lane residential street, soon leaving the hamlet. Just east of the hamlet, NY 17C and the lines come back together as NY 17C intersects with the northern terminus of NY 282, which connects to NY 17 and the village of Nichols. After NY 282, the route bends southeast, paralleling the railroad tracks once again, before turning northeast through Tioga. The route becomes more developed as it continues northeast, entering the hamlet of Tioga Center.

==== Tioga Center to Campville ====
In Tioga Center, NY 17C is a two-lane residential street, intersecting with Fifth Avenue, which connects to a large commercial section. A short distance to the northeast, the route intersects with CR 7 (Halsey Valley Road). This intersection served as the southern terminus of NY 225 until the late 1940s. Paralleling the tracks and the Susquehanna River, NY 17C continues northeast, bending further eastward through a string of fields. Just after crossing the railroad tracks, NY 17C intersects with the terminus of CR 23 (Glen Mary Drive). Now running northeast, the route is south and east of the railroad tracks, changing names to Waverly Road as it crosses through Tioga as a two-lane residential street.

NY 17C continues northeast through Tioga, passing southeast of Tioga Cemetery, intersecting with the southern terminus of CR 43 (Goodrich Road). After CR 43, NY 17C turns eastward, passing several spurts of commercial strips before entering the village of Owego. In Owego, the route passes south of Marvin Park, crossing northeast as Main Street, a two-lane commercial street through the village. After several blocks of residences and businesses, NY 17C meets NY 96 at an intersection with Park Street. The two routes form a concurrency for one block along two one-way, north–south streets, Court Street (westbound) and Park Street (eastbound). Together, they comprise a one-way couplet that travels around the Tioga County Courthouse. The overlap ends on the northern bank of the Susquehanna River, where NY 96 continues across the river to access NY 17 and NY 434 while NY 17C turns east onto a two-lane residential street named Front Street.

The route continues east through Owego, following Front Street for five blocks before veering southeast onto Fifth Avenue at a junction with John Street. Paralleling the Norfolk Southern tracks once again, NY 17C proceeds southeast alongside a stretch of houses near the Susquehanna River, crossing into the town of Owego. The route soon becomes commercial alongside the river, entering a large trumpet interchange which connects to NY 434 and NY 17 across the Susquehanna. After the interchange, NY 17C crosses over the tracks, bending southeast through Owego, becoming a two-lane residential street. Running alongside the tracks and the Susquehanna again, the route makes another stretch to the northeast, bending southeast through Owego.

Soon making a large bend to the south, NY 17C becomes residential, entering the hamlet of Campville. NY 17C through Campville remains residential, serving several homes on both sides of the road. Just after leaving the hamlet of Campville, NY 17C intersects with the northern terminus of NY 962J, a reference route erroneously signed as a touring route. NY 17C continues eastward through the town of Owego, running on an embankment high over the Norfolk Southern tracks, remaining a two-lane residential road as it bends northeast. Running northeast, the route crosses several residential neighborhoods of Owego before crossing the county line into Broome County.

=== Broome County ===
Crossing into Broome County, NY 17C abruptly climbs up the side of Bornt Hill and parallels the tracks and river into the town of Union, entering the urban core of the Binghamton metropolitan area. The route, still bearing the name of Campville Road, runs over the hill to the north and west of Tri-Cities Airport and the Triple Cities to the east become visible for the first time. After passing Glendale Technology Park, a former IBM complex, NY 17C crosses over to the south side of the railroad and passes the En-Joie Golf Course, one of the many remnants of the area's prosperity under Endicott-Johnson. As it takes on the name West Main Street and crosses South Grippen Avenue, NY 17C becomes a residential street, passing numerous single-family homes for a short distance as it crosses the border into Endicott. The route becomes a commercial village street before intersecting with NY 26, Nanticoke Avenue, at the center of downtown Union. Now concurrent, NY 17C and NY 26 pick up an additional lane on each side as they proceed east as East Main Street through Endicott. The next major intersection is with Vestal Avenue, where NY 26 formerly left NY 17C, turning south and crossing the Susquehanna River to enter Vestal on Bridge Street, now CR 48. After Vestal Avenue, NY 17C and NY 26 pass under the Endicott Square Deal Arch.

Just before entering the center of Endicott, passing several businesses along with Union-Endicott High School. Shortly after passing downtown Endicott, NY 26 forks off of NY 17C via a partial cloverleaf interchange, which crosses south across the Susquehanna River. NY 17C meanwhile, continues northeast along East Main Street, the two-lane commercial and residential street. Passing into the hamlet of Endwell, the route parallels the tracks to the south, intersecting with North Street. Becoming a two-lane commercial street through Endwell, NY 17C continues east into the hamlet of South Endwell. The route expands to four lanes, entering an interchange with CR 33 (Hooper Road).

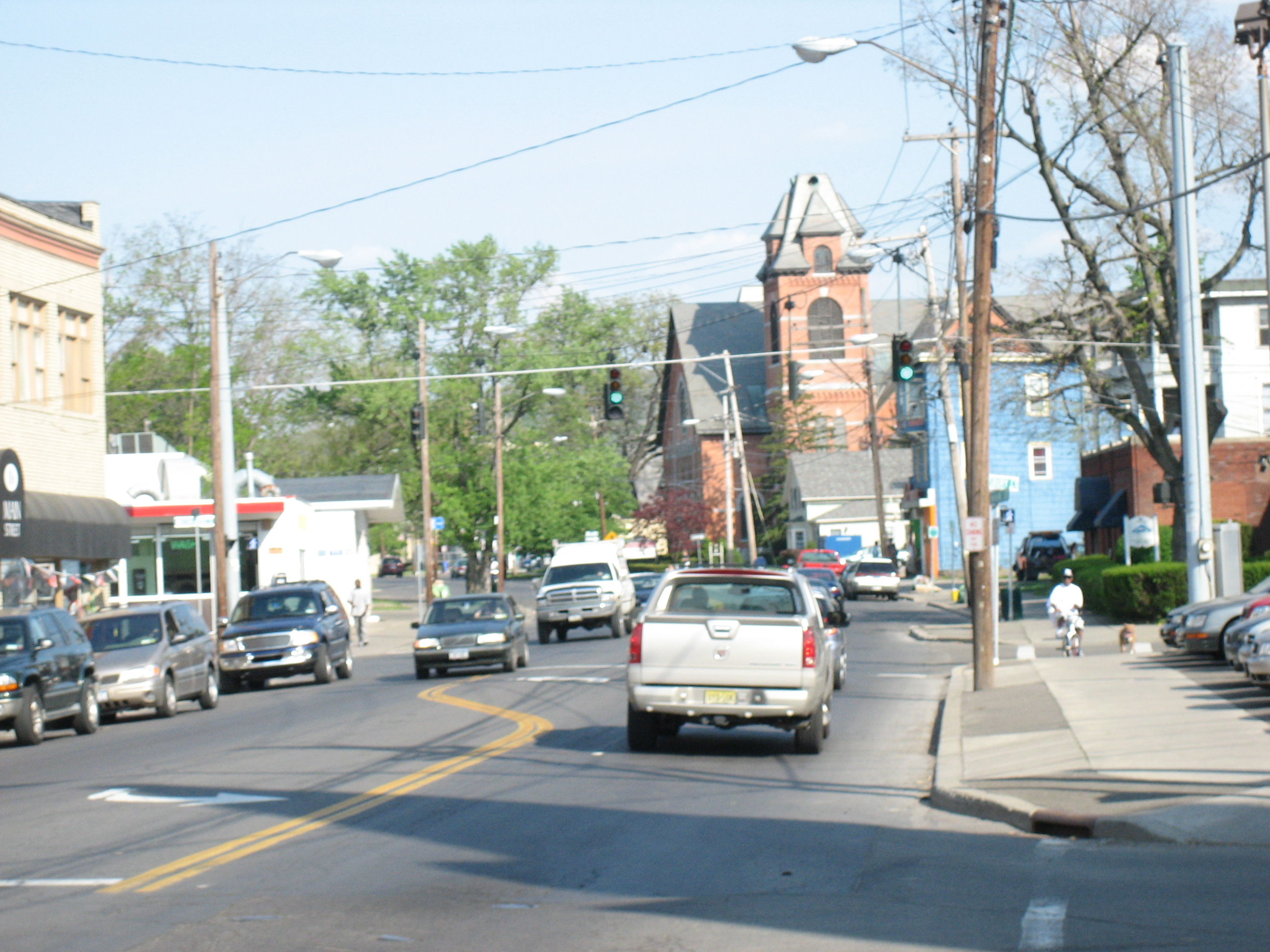
NY 17C (Main Street) at Chestnut Street in Binghamton

Paralleling the tracks and the Southern Tier Expressway once again, NY 17C forks away from the railroad tracks, becoming a divided highway split into one-way sections. Each section runs along opposite sides of the freeway; as such, each serves as a frontage road for exit 69 of the expressway. While in this configuration, NY 17C is known as the George F. Highway. The two directions of NY 17C come back together in the hamlet of Westover, located about 1.5 miles (2.4 km) to the east on the north bank of the Susquehanna River. In Westover, the route becomes a two-lane commercial street named Main Street. A short distance later, NY 17C enters an interchange with NY 201 before entering the village of Johnson City. Remaining the two-lane commercial street it was, NY 17C crosses east through Johnson City, passing north of Wilson Memorial Regional Medical Center, intersecting with Arch Street in the center of the village.

Paralleling south of the tracks, NY 17C crosses south of the Johnson City station site. The route proceeds southeast through Johnson City, running as a two-lane commercial street. Crossing over the tracks once owned by the Delaware, Lackawanna and Western Railroad, NY 17C enters the city of Binghamton, where maintenance shifts for the New York State Department of Transportation (NYSDOT) to the city. Retaining its Main Street moniker, NY 17C continues as a two-lane commercial street for several blocks, until the intersection with Schiller Street, where residences begin to appear. Continuing southeast through Binghamton, the route bends eastward along Main Street, passing north of Binghamton High School prior to intersecting US 11 (Front Street) just west of the Chenango River. NY 17C ends here while Main Street continues east for an additional 80 yards (73 m) to the Court Street Bridge as part of US 11.

== History ==
The section of what is now NY 17C between Waverly and Owego was originally designated as part of Route 4, an unsigned legislative route, by the New York State Legislature in 1908. When the first set of posted routes in New York were assigned in 1924, most of legislative Route 4—including from Waverly to Owego—became part of NY 17. In the 1930 renumbering of state highways in New York, NY 17 was left as-is from Waverly to Owego while NY 17C was assigned to the portion of its current alignment east of Owego.

On January 1, 1970, NY 17 was officially rerouted onto the new Southern Tier Expressway (STE) between Waverly and Vestal even though the section of the freeway between Waverly and Nichols had yet to be completed. In actuality, NY 17 continued to follow its original surface alignment from Waverly to Nichols, where it used a portion of NY 282 to reach the freeway. The former surface routing of NY 17 from Nichols to Owego became part of an extended NY 17C c. 1971. The Waverly–Nichols segment of the STE was completed c. 1974, at which time NY 17 was realigned to follow the freeway while NY 17C was extended west over NY 17's former alignment to Waverly.

== Major intersections ==
County	Location	mi	km	Destinations	Notes
Tioga	Waverly	0.00	0.00	NY 34 (Cayuta Street) to I-86 / NY 17 / Southern Tier Expressway – Sayre, Athens, Elmira, Binghamton	
Tioga	Tioga	9.93	15.98	NY 282 south to I-86 / NY 17 / Southern Tier Expressway – Nichols, Tioga Downs	Northern terminus of NY 282; hamlet of Smithboro
Tioga	Tioga	15.30	24.62	CR 7 north (Halsey Valley Road)	Southern terminus of CR 7 (former NY 225); hamlet of Tioga Center
Tioga	Village of Owego	18.74	30.16	NY 96 north (Main Street)	Western terminus of NY 96 concurrency
Tioga	Village of Owego	18.87	30.37	NY 96 south to I-86 / NY 17	Eastern terminus of NY 96 concurrency
Tioga	Town of Owego	20.95	33.72	To I-86 / NY 17 / Southern Tier Expressway – Binghamton, Corning, Elmira, Jamestown	Interchange; access via NY 960J
Tioga	Town of Owego	27.14	43.68	NY 962J south to I-86 / NY 17 / Southern Tier Expressway / NY 434	Northern terminus of NY 962J
Broome	Endicott	31.97	51.45	NY 26 north (Nanticoke Avenue)	Western terminus of NY 26 concurrency
Broome	Endicott	33.21	53.45	NY 26 south to I-86 west / NY 17 / Southern Tier Expressway – Vestal	Interchange; eastern terminus of NY 26 concurrency
Broome	Union	35.24	56.71	Future I-86 / NY 17 – Binghamton, Corning	Exit 69 on NY 17
Broome	Johnson City	37.43	60.24	NY 201 to Future I-86 / NY 17 / Riverside Drive	Partial cloverleaf interchange
Broome	Binghamton	40.34	64.92	US 11 (Front Street)	
1.000 mi = 1.609 km; 1.000 km = 0.621 mi: Concurrency terminus
