= Interstate 86 (Pennsylvania–New York) =

Interstate Highway in the northern U.S.

Interstate 86
- Map of Pennsylvania and New York with I-86 (signed segments) highlighted in red

Route information
- Maintained by PennDOT and NYSDOT
- Existed: December 3, 1999–present
- NHS: Entire route

Main segment
- Length: 244.00 mi (392.68 km)
- West end: I-90 in Greenfield Township, PA
- Major intersections: US 62 in Poland, NY; US 219 in Salamanca, NY; I-390 in Avoca, NY; I-99 / US 15 / NY 417 in Erwin, NY; US 220 in South Waverly, PA
- East end: NY 17 / NY 26 in Vestal, NY

Eastern segment
- Length: 10.02 mi (16.13 km)
- West end: I-81 / NY 17 / NY 990G in Kirkwood, NY
- East end: NY 17 / NY 79 in Windsor, NY

Location
- Country: United States
- States: Pennsylvania, New York
- Counties: PA: Erie; Bradford; NY: Chautauqua, Cattaraugus, Allegany, Steuben, Chemung, Tioga, Broome

Highway system
- Interstate Highway System; Main; Auxiliary; Suffixed; Business; Future
- Pennsylvania State Route System; Interstate; US; State; Scenic; Legislative
- New York Highways; Interstate; US; State; Reference; Parkways
← PA 85	PA	→ PA 86
← NY 85A	NY	→ NY 86

Interstate 86 (I-86) is an Interstate Highway that extends for 254.02 miles (408.81 km) through northwestern Pennsylvania and the Southern Tier region of New York, in the United States. The highway has two segments: the longer of the two begins at an interchange with I-90 east of Erie, Pennsylvania, and ends at New York State Route 26 (NY 26) in Vestal, New York, in Broome County, while the second extends from I-81 east of Binghamton to NY 79 in Windsor. When projects to upgrade the existing NY 17 to Interstate Highway standards are completed, I-86 will extend from I-90 near Erie to the New York State Thruway (I-87) in Woodbury. The portion in Erie County, Pennsylvania, is known as the Hopkins-Bowser Highway and is signed as such at each end. In New York, the current and future alignment of I-86 is known as the Southern Tier Expressway west of I-81 in Binghamton and the Quickway east of I-81.

I-86 travels 7.00 miles (11.27 km) in Pennsylvania and 247.02 miles (397.54 km) in New York. Except for a section of about 1.5 miles (2.4 km) that dips into Pennsylvania at exit 60 near the New York village of Waverly, the Pennsylvania borough of South Waverly, and the section passing through Greenfield Township from I-90 to the Pennsylvania–New York state line, the rest of I-86 will be in New York. The section of NY 17 through South Waverly is maintained by the New York State Department of Transportation (NYSDOT), however. The Southern Tier Expressway section of I-86 and NY 17 comprises Corridor T of the Appalachian Development Highway System. I-86 connects to US Route 219 (US 219) in Salamanca, I-390 near Avoca, and I-99/US 15 just west of Corning.

Most of the Quickway and the Southern Tier Expressway was built in stages from the 1950s to the 1980s. The I-86 designation was assigned on December 3, 1999, to the entirety of since-decommissioned Pennsylvania Route 17 (PA 17) and to the westernmost 177 miles (285 km) of NY 17. It has been extended eastward as more sections of the existing NY 17 freeway have been upgraded to Interstate Highway standards, first to NY 14 in Horseheads in 2004, to NY 352 in Elmira in 2008, to the Chemung–Tioga county line in 2013, and to exit 67 (NY 26) in Vestal in 2024.. The segment of NY 17 between I-81 and NY 79 was designated as part of I-86 in 2006, but this segment currently remains discontinuous with the rest of I-86 while work is being done in the Binghamton area to bring NY 17 up to Interstate standards.

== Route description ==
Lengths
	mi	km
PA	7.00	11.27
NY	247.02	397.54
Total	254.02	408.81

=== Pennsylvania to Olean ===
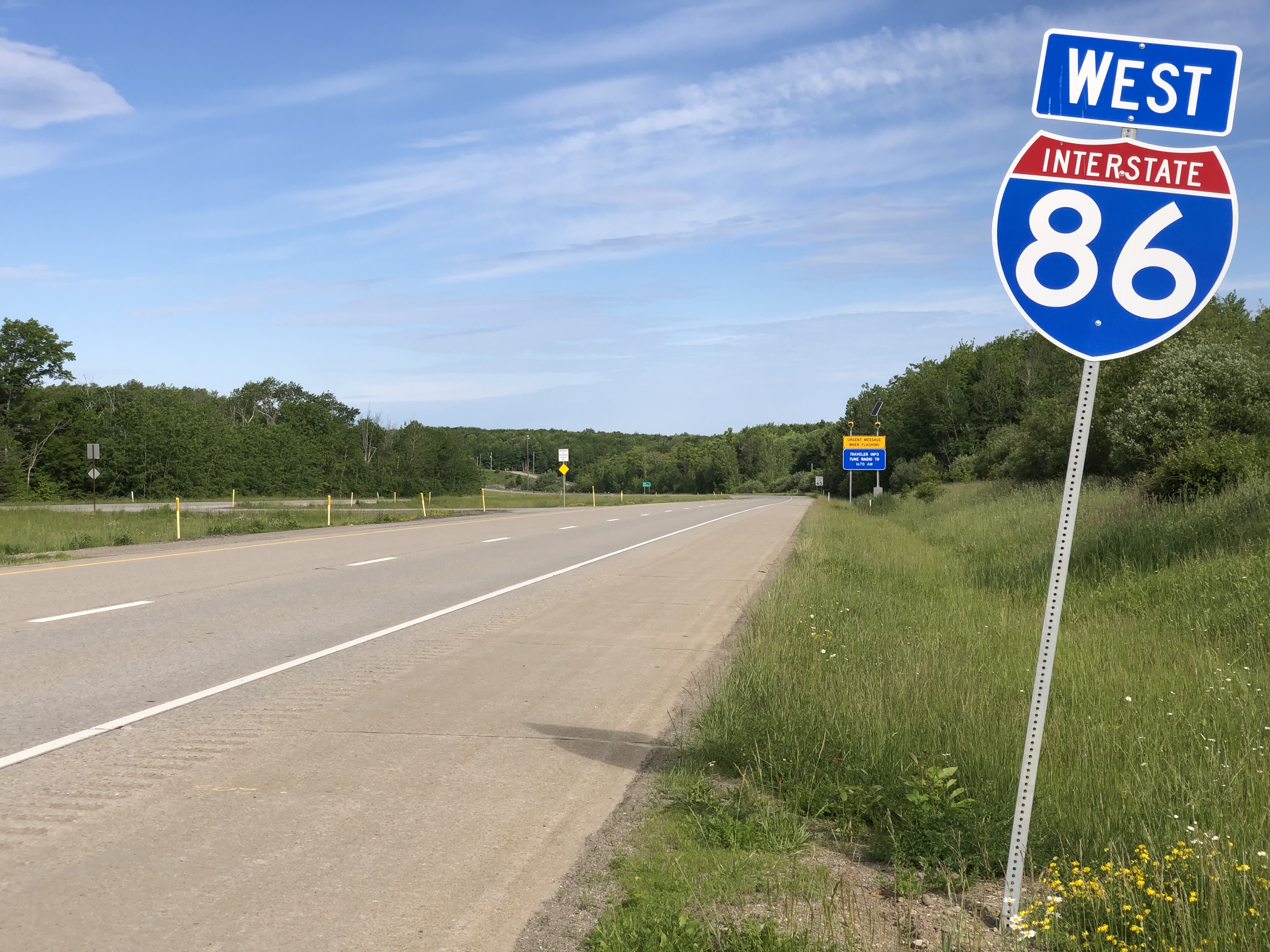
I-86 westbound past PA 89 in Greenfield Township

I-86 begins at an interchange with I-90 in a relatively flat area of northwestern Pennsylvania. It heads to the southeast, meeting PA 89 at exit 3 before curving to the east and crossing into New York, where it becomes concurrent with NY 17. The freeway heads generally eastward across southwest Chautauqua County, serving the hamlet of Findley Lake and the village of Sherman via NY 426 and NY 76, respectively, as it proceeds toward Chautauqua Lake.

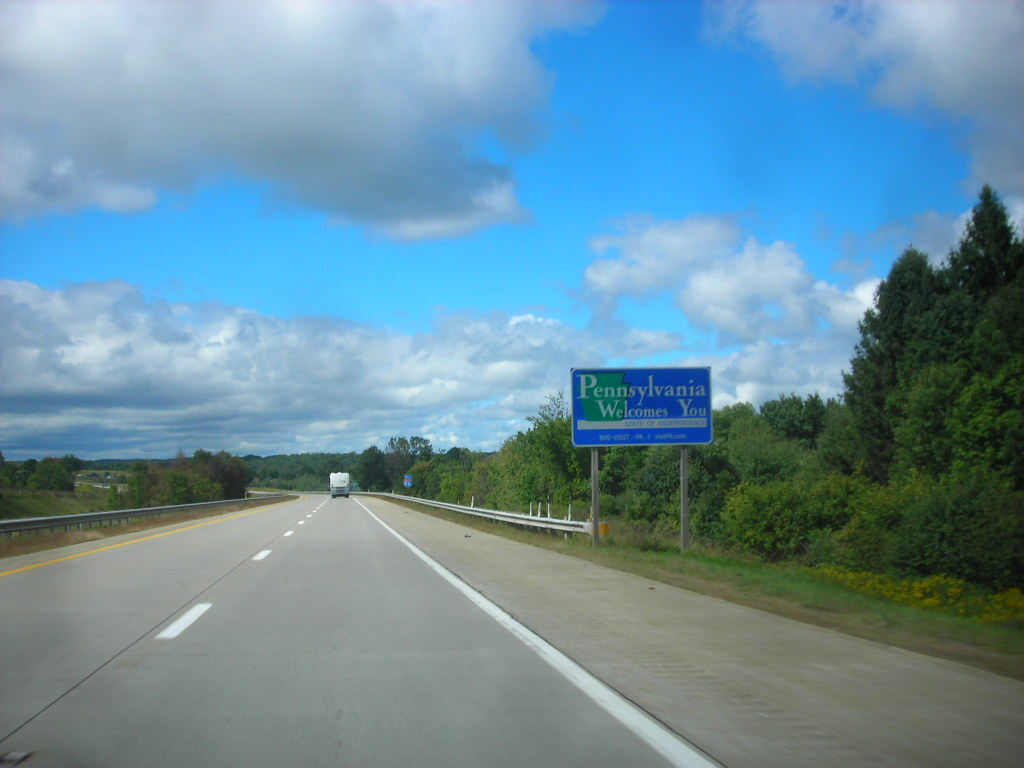
Entering Pennsylvania on I-86 westbound in Erie County

After crossing Chautauqua Lake, I-86 merges into an older section of freeway at exit 10 near Bemus Point; this freeway is now NY 954J northwest of the newer extension. NY 954J runs into NY 430, which (along with NY 394) carried NY 17 to Westfield before the 1980s extension. From Bemus Point to Jamestown (exit 12), I-86 parallels the old NY 17 (now NY 430) along the northeast shore of Chautauqua Lake. The Erie Railroad extension to Chicago (built as the Atlantic and Great Western Railroad) comes into Jamestown from the southwest and parallels I-86 to its junction with the Erie's original main line to Dunkirk at Salamanca.

From Jamestown to Salamanca, the old NY 17 (now mostly NY 394), the new I-86 and the railroad run generally parallel through river valleys. The transportation routes run along the Chadakoin River, Conewango Creek and Little Conewango Creek to Steamburg (exit 17), cutting east to the Allegheny River at Coldspring there. The valley of the Allegheny takes the routes to Salamanca (exit 20), where the railroads merged, and beyond to Olean (exits 25 and 26). From Salamanca to Olean, the old NY 17 is now NY 417. At Olean, the Allegheny River and NY 417 (old NY 17) continue southeast, while I-86 and the Erie Railroad head northeast. NY 417 does not return to I-86 until exit 44 near Painted Post, and the Erie switches between the two alignments several times.

=== Olean to Elmira ===
I-86 and the old Erie line (now part of the Western New York and Pennsylvania Railroad) run northeast along the valleys of Olean Creek and Oil Creek to Cuba (exit 28). From Cuba to Friendship (exit 29), they run through a valley and over a summit, then following Van Campen Creek northeast to Belvidere (exit 30). At Belvidere, the Erie turns southeast to meet NY 417 at Wellsville, but I-86 continues northeast through the valleys of the Genesee River and Angelica Creek to Angelica (exit 31), and then east along Angelica Creek, over a summit that is the highest point on the Interstate, and along Karr Valley Creek to Almond (exit 33). This summit, at 2,110 feet (640 m) above sea level, is the highest point along I-86, located between exits 32 (West Almond) and 33 and marked with a sign.

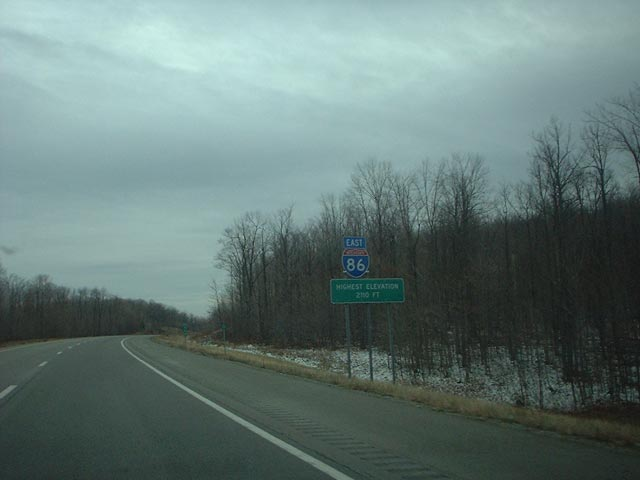
Signage denoting the highest point on I-86 in Almond

At Almond, I-86 rejoins the Erie Railroad, passing through Canacadea Creek valley about halfway to Hornellsville. However, where the railroad turns southeast to Hornellsville, I-86 continues northeast across a summit and into the wide Canisteo River valley (exit 34). It leaves the valley along Carrington Creek but quickly turns east across a summit to follow Big Creek and cross another summit to Howard (exit 35). I-86 runs alongside Goff Creek from Howard to the wide Cohocton River valley, where it meets the south end of I-390 (exit 36) near Avoca and turns southeast through that valley, parallel to the Erie's Rochester–Painted Post line (Buffalo, New York, and Erie Railroad).

I-86, NY 415 (old US 15) and the Erie branch all run southeast along the Cohocton River past Bath (exit 38) to Painted Post (exit 44), now the north end of I-99 and US 15. NY 417 (old NY 17) also ends at exit 44, while NY 415 continues east into Corning (exits 45–46). From Painted Post through Corning to Big Flats (exit 49), I-86, NY 352 (old NY 17) and the Erie Railroad run through the Chemung River valley. NY 352 begins at exit 45, west of downtown Corning, and is a recently bypassed four-lane road through Corning. East of East Corning (exit 48), the freeway was built as an on-the-spot upgrade of the old NY 17.

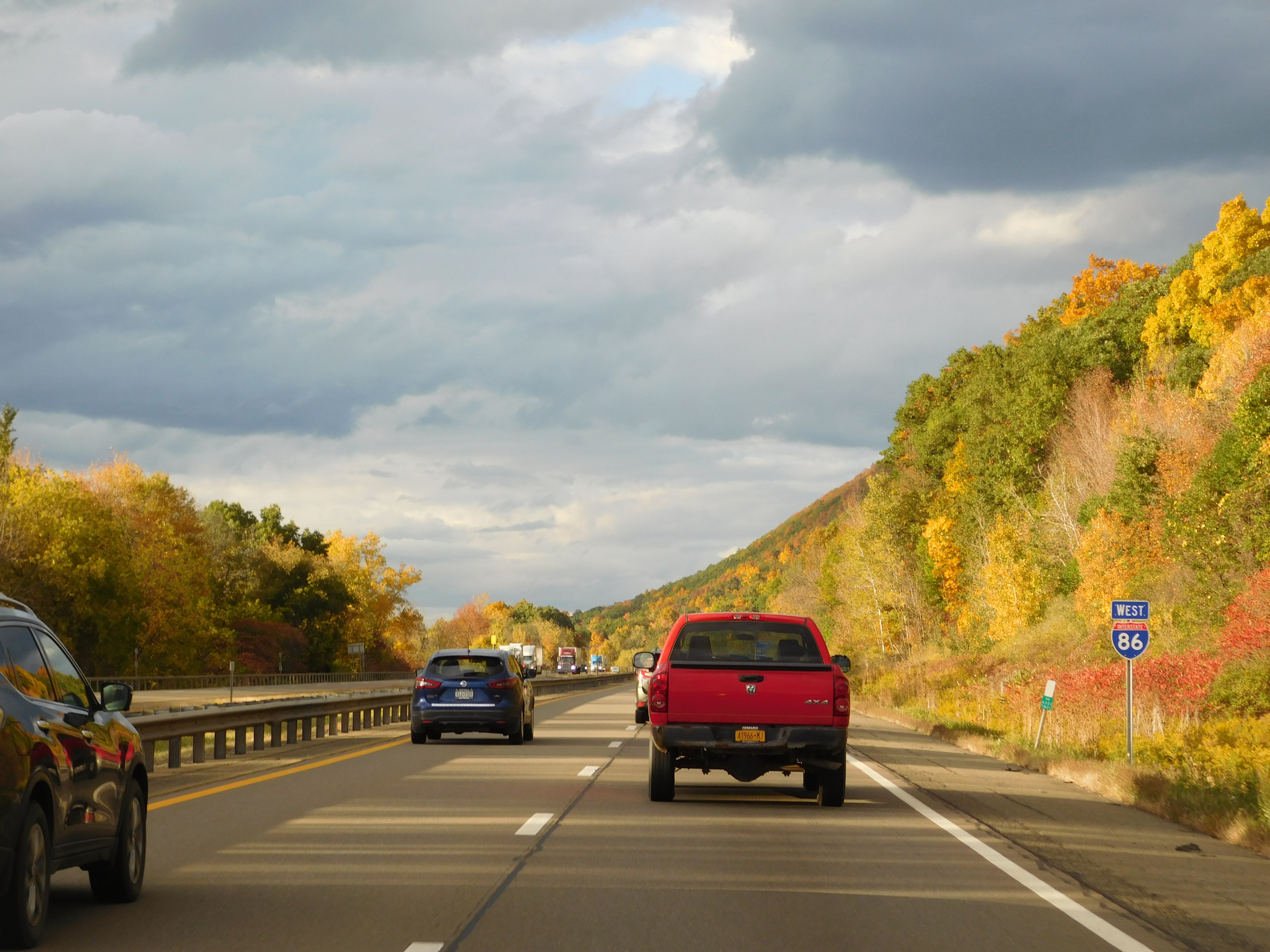
I-86 westbound in Chemung County

At Big Flats, the Chemung River (and NY 352) turns southeast to downtown Elmira, while I-86 and the Erie continue east-northeast alongside Singsing Creek to the vicinity of Elmira Corning Regional Airport. The highway continues into Horseheads, where it becomes an elevated highway through the use of a large arrangement of embankments and bridges. It connects to NY 14 and NY 13 via exits 52 and 54, respectively, before turning south to follow Newtown Creek into Elmira. Just east of the city's downtown district, I-86 meets NY 352 (exit 56), then continues to the Chemung–Tioga county line.

=== Elmira to Vestal ===
From NY 352 onwards, I-86 straddles the Chemung River past Elmira towards Waverly, where it briefly dips back into Pennsylvania for a few yards and intersects U.S. Route 220 before turning back into New York, now straddling the Susquehanna River. The freeway passes by the Tioga Downs racetrack and casino in Nichols before an interchange with NY 96 and NY 434 in Owego.

I-86 and NY 17 continue following the Susquehanna into Broome County with NY 434, the former NY 17, running parallel to the freeway. I-86 and NY 17 then intersects with NY 26 at a clover interchange in Vestal, with NY 17 continuing along the freeway towards Binghamton. The I-86 designation ends here for now; however, a 9.9-mile (15.9 km) section of NY 17 just east of Binghamton is also designated as I-86, creating a temporary gap in the designation. This segment runs from I-81 at exit 75 in Kirkwood to NY 79 at exit 79 in Windsor.

== History ==
=== Origins and the Quickway ===
The first long-distance route through the modern I-86 corridor was NY 17, which extended from Westfield to New Jersey via Harriman when it was assigned in 1924. Much of NY 17 followed a routing parallel or identical to that of the modern Southern Tier Expressway and Quickway; however, it followed a more northerly routing between Westfield and Bemus Point (via modern NY 394 and NY 430) and a more southerly track from Belvidere to Corning (via what is now NY 19 and NY 417). NY 17 was realigned as part of the 1930 state highway renumbering to travel directly from Olean to Wellsville on modern NY 417, located well to the south of today's Southern Tier Expressway.

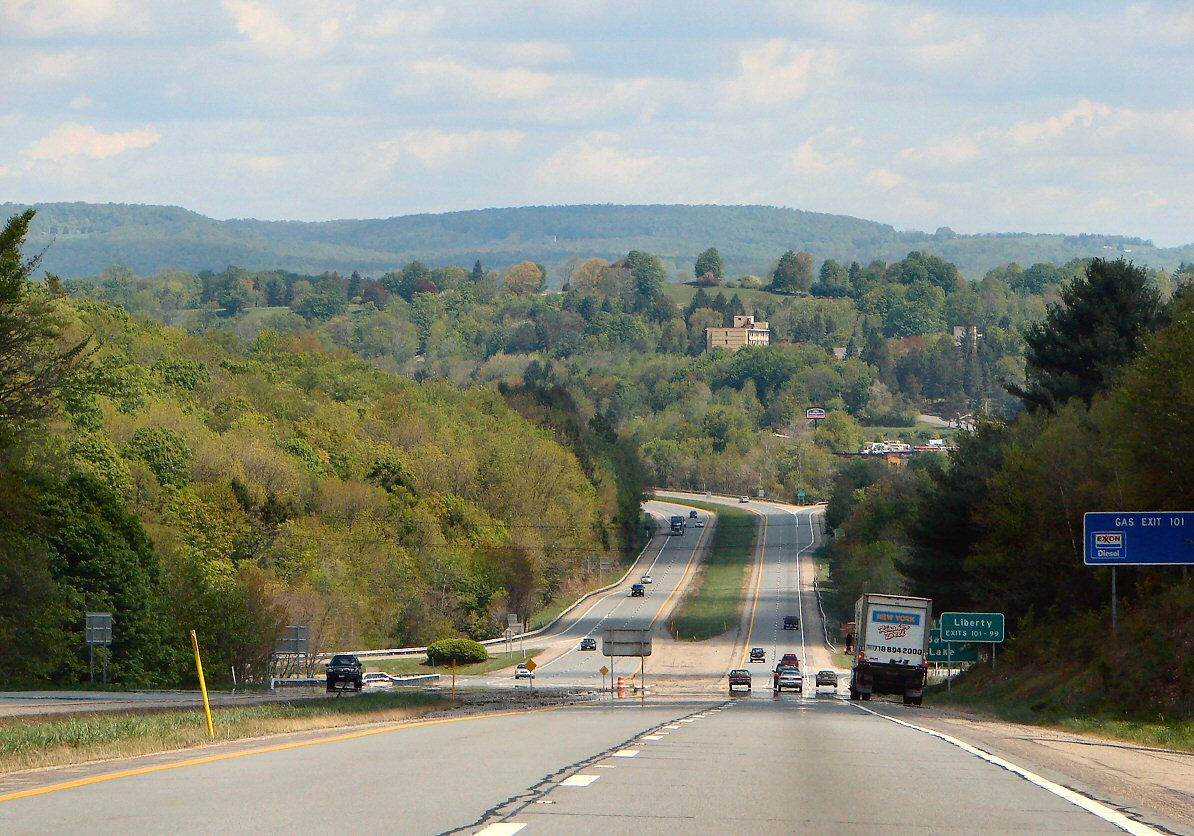
NY 17 (future I-86) at Liberty

By the late 1940s, the portion of NY 17 through the Catskill Mountains and Orange and Rockland counties had become prone to massive traffic jams due to both its winding and narrow composition and congestion in the villages and hamlets along the highway. As a result, the state of New York began making plans to construct an expressway leading from the New York State Thruway at Harriman to the Catskills. Construction of the NY 17 freeway began in 1947 in the Hudson Valley town of Wallkill. The first section of the new freeway, a bypass of Middletown between Fair Oaks (exit 118A, since removed) and Goshen (exit 123), opened to traffic in July 1951 as a realignment of NY 17. In 1954, several severe accidents occurred along parts of the surface NY 17, compelling the state to make constructing the freeway, dubbed the "Quickway", a higher priority.

The road was extended east first, reaching Chester (exit 127) in October 1954 and the Thruway near Harriman in August 1955. To the west, a section of the highway through Sullivan and Delaware counties was built over the right-of-way of the defunct New York, Ontario and Western Railway. Most of the Sullivan County section of the Quickway was completed during the 1950s, with the first section within the county—between Rock Hill (exit 108) and Wurtsboro (exit 114)—opening in December 1956. A second section, from Ferndale (exit 101) to north of Liberty (exit 98), was completed in July 1958. The gap between Wurtsboro and Fair Oaks in Orange County was filled on October 23, 1958, while the section between Ferndale and Rock Hill was completed in two stages. The section east of modern exit 104 in Monticello was opened in July 1959; the part north of that point opened in December 1960.

By 1969, with the assistance of federal funding from the Appalachian Regional Commission procured by New York's US Senator Robert F. Kennedy, the 130-mile (210 km) route provided nonstop access between Harriman and Binghamton, and by extension New York City to Binghamton. It connected the New York State Thruway (I-87) to I-81. Despite flaws in the highway's design—it included a grade-level railroad crossing near Fair Oaks (since removed) and two stretches with intersections and driveway access—the Quickway succeeded in easing travel through southern New York, cutting the driving time in half and the accident rate by 70 percent.

=== Southern Tier Expressway ===
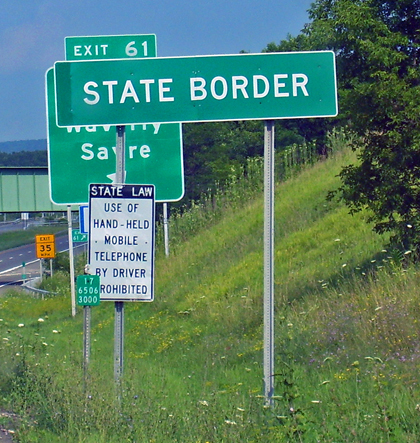
Sign along eastbound NY 17 (future I-86) marking return to New York after its brief foray into Pennsylvania

In February 1953, New York Governor Thomas E. Dewey proposed constructing four superhighways across the state to supplement the New York State Thruway. One of the four proposed limited-access highways would cut across the Southern Tier, linking I-90 in the west to Binghamton in the east. The first segments of what became known as the Southern Tier Expressway, a westward continuation of the Quickway, were completed in the mid-1960s. Four sections were opened to traffic at this time: Kennedy (exit 14) to Randolph (exit 16), Coldspring (exit 17) to western Salamanca (exit 20), Campbell (exit 41) to Corning (exit 45), and East Corning (exit 48) to Lowman (exit 57), parts of which were built as a surface highway. The Coldspring to Salamanca section was built out of necessity: in 1967, the first stress test of the Kinzua Dam had submerged part of the original NY 17 into the Allegheny Reservoir and made it impassable. Construction of the new highway destroyed most of the town of Red House.

A fifth section, from Owego (exit 65) to Johnson City (exit 69), opened in early 1969. The portion of the expressway between Nichols (exit 62) and Owego was opened to traffic on October 3, 1969.

Route marker used along the Southern Tier Expressway

Four more segments of the Southern Tier Expressway were completed over the course of the next three years. By 1972, the gaps between Randolph and Coldspring and from Johnson City to I-81 in Binghamton were filled while the expressway was extended west from Kennedy to Falconer (exit 13) and east from Lowman to Waverly (exit 60). The missing link between Waverly and Nichols was completed by 1974. The portion of the freeway in and around Waverly was originally planned to be built on the right-of-way of the Delaware, Lackawanna and Western Railroad through southern Waverly; however, the plan was scrapped in favor of a more southerly alignment that passed through the borough of South Waverly, Pennsylvania. The realignment saved $2 million (equivalent to $11.8 million in 2024) in construction costs and spared a handful of industries in the highway's proposed path. Both state legislatures approved the realignment in 1966 after New York agreed to maintain the section of the freeway in Pennsylvania. As part of an agreement made between the two states, Pennsylvania acquired the necessary right-of-way and easements for the freeway at the expense of New York.

Three other segments of the freeway were completed by 1974. Two of the three—from Jamestown (exit 11) and Falconer and between Almond (exit 33) and Campbell—were extensions of preexisting sections while the third, connecting Allegany (exit 24) to Hinsdale (exit 27), was isolated from the other portions of the highway. This was only temporary, however, as the freeway was completed between Hinsdale and Belvidere (exit 30) by January 1975 and opened to traffic from Belvidere to Almond on January 30, 1975. The Southern Tier Expressway was extended westward to Bemus Point by 1977, initially utilizing what is now NY 954J. In the early 1980s, work began on a westward extension to the vicinity of Erie, Pennsylvania. The Findley Lake–Bemus Point (exits 4–10) segment was completed by 1985 while the portion from I-90 east of Erie to Findley Lake was opened by 1989. From I-90 to exit 8, the freeway was initially built as a super two highway, with both directions utilizing what are now the eastbound lanes. The westbound lanes were built at a cost of $34 million (equivalent to $61.5 million in 2024) and opened to traffic on October 2, 1997.

==== Salamanca and Corning ====
Construction of the freeway between exits 20 and 24 was delayed for several years by members of the Seneca people, who objected to the freeway's proposed routing through the Allegany Indian Reservation. On June 29, 1976, the state of New York made an agreement with the Seneca nation that paid approximately $1.8 million (equivalent to $7.7 million in 2024) to the Seneca people and property owners for the 795 acres (322 ha) of land comprising the highway's proposed routing. In addition, the state ceded 795 acres (322 ha) of land to the Seneca people—750 (300) of which were taken from the adjacent Allegany State Park—and agreed to support several tax and regulatory exemptions for the Senecas. The transaction was completed in September 1981, and construction on the segment began in 1982. The portion of the expressway between exits 20 and 21 was completed by 1985.

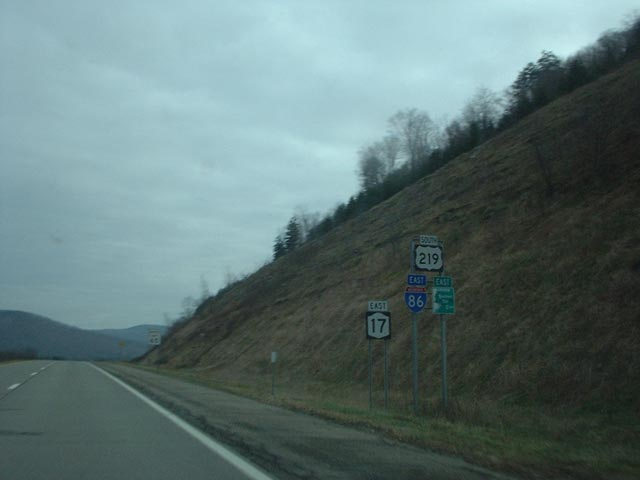
Eastbound on I-86 and southbound on US 219 near Salamanca

On July 21, 1985, construction was halted by protesting Senecas who did not accept the authority of the Seneca people’s leadership. The protest was organized in part by two owners of property in the path of the highway and involved the construction of an encampment on the right-of-way of the Southern Tier Expressway. The state had conducted studies on realigning the highway to bypass the disputed section; however, the Indians vacated the encampment five days later. A temporary injunction prohibiting further disruptions of the highway's construction was issued in early August, allowing work on the Salamanca–Seneca Junction (exit 23) section of the expressway to resume on August 13. This segment was completed by 1989 while the last section between Seneca Junction and Allegany was opened to traffic by 1995.

Work on the Corning Bypass, a freeway around the northern and eastern fringes of the city of Corning, began in the mid-1980s. The first segment of the highway—between NY 414 (exit 46) and East Corning—was completed by 1989 while the rest opened in the mid-1990s. The completion of the Corning Bypass, remedying the last substantial gap in the freeway, created a continuous, mostly limited-access highway between Erie, Pennsylvania, and Harriman, New York. The completed highway, designated as PA 17 and NY 17, served as a time-saving, toll-free alternate route to the Thruway for motorists going from the New York City area to Ohio and points west. In fact, the New York State Thruway Authority initially opposed the highway's construction, fearing the loss of toll revenue on its own route from motorists shunpiking via the new highway.

=== Designation and conversion ===
Pennsylvania Route 17
- Location: Erie County
- Length: 6.997 mi (11.261 km)
- Existed: 1987–1999

The portion of the two-state freeway from I-90 near Erie to I-81 in Binghamton is designated as Corridor T of the Appalachian Development Highway System. In 1998, all of PA 17 and the portion of NY 17 from the Pennsylvania state line to Harriman were designated "High Priority Corridor 36" in the Transportation Equity Act for the 21st Century (TEA-21). New York politicians, including Senator Daniel Patrick Moynihan, and businesspeople backed the move in the hope that an efficient, high-speed roadway would inspire companies to start or expand their businesses in the state's southern counties. Shortly after the passage of TEA-21, Corridor 36 was legislatively designated as I-86 in an amendment to the bill. The American Association of State Highway and Transportation Officials (AASHTO) formally approved the designation on November 6, 1998, as "Future I-86".

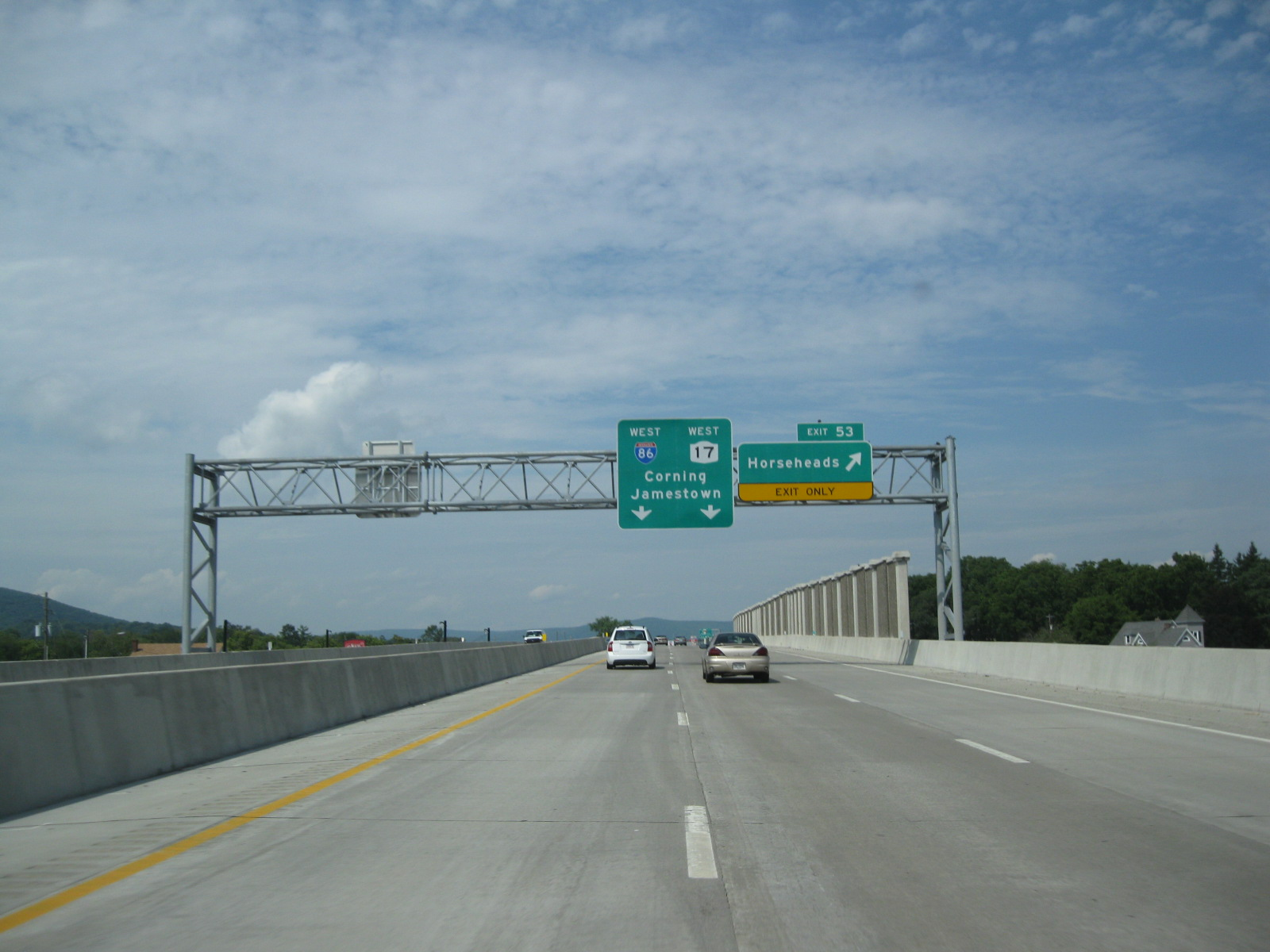
Approaching exit 53 on the westbound Horseheads Bypass (I-86)

On December 3, 1999, all of PA 17 and the westernmost 177 miles (285 km) of NY 17 were officially designated as I-86 by the Federal Highway Administration (FHWA) following improvements to bring the roadway up to Interstate Highway standards. The designation was extended eight miles (13 km) eastward to NY 14 in Horseheads on January 28, 2004, after that section had been upgraded. On May 1, 2006, the 10-mile (16 km) portion of NY 17 from I-81 in Binghamton east to NY 79 in Windsor was designated as part of I-86 following the elimination of at-grade intersections and the reconstruction of exit ramps along the stretch. The completion of the $30-million (equivalent to $44.8 million in 2024) project increased the total mileage of I-86 to 195 miles (314 km) and created a temporary gap in the designation.

In Horseheads, a $60-million (equivalent to $87.2 million in 2024) project to elevate the highway and remove at-grade intersections in the village between NY 14 (exit 52) and NY 13 (exit 54) began in April 2004 and was completed on August 20, 2007. NYSDOT subsequently sought permission from the FHWA to extend I-86 over the new bypass and the existing NY 17 freeway to NY 352 in Elmira; it was granted on March 28, 2008, adding another 5.9 miles (9.5 km) to the route.

A 6.5-mile (10.5 km) portion of NY 17 between exits 56 and 59 originally had several at-grade intersections. Work on a project to eliminate the junctions began in January 2010. Three discontinuous sections of County Route 60 (CR 60, named Brant Road, Oneida Road, and Old NY 17), a parallel surface road, were linked together as part of the project. Two of the three at-grade junctions with CR 60—the east junction with Brant Road and the west junction with Oneida Road—were permanently closed on March 24, 2010, to allow construction to begin on the new alignment of the county route between the two locations. The $65-million (equivalent to $87.5 million in 2024) project was completed on November 1, 2012.

On November 14, 2024, NYSDOT announced the extension of the I-86 designation from exit 60 to exit 67 (NY 26) in Vestal.

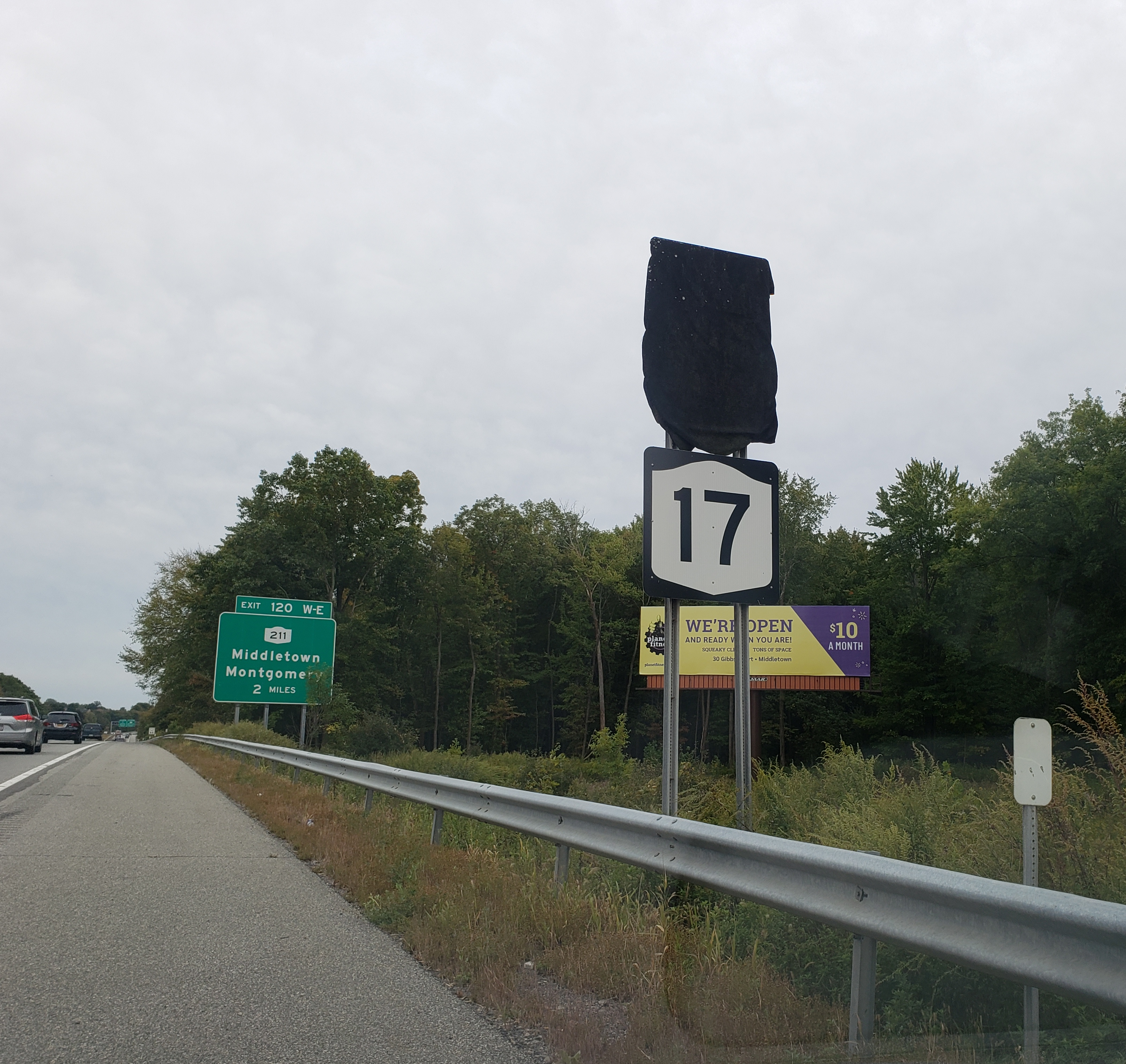
An I-86 EB sign covered up soon to be designated awaiting approval in Middletown

== Future ==
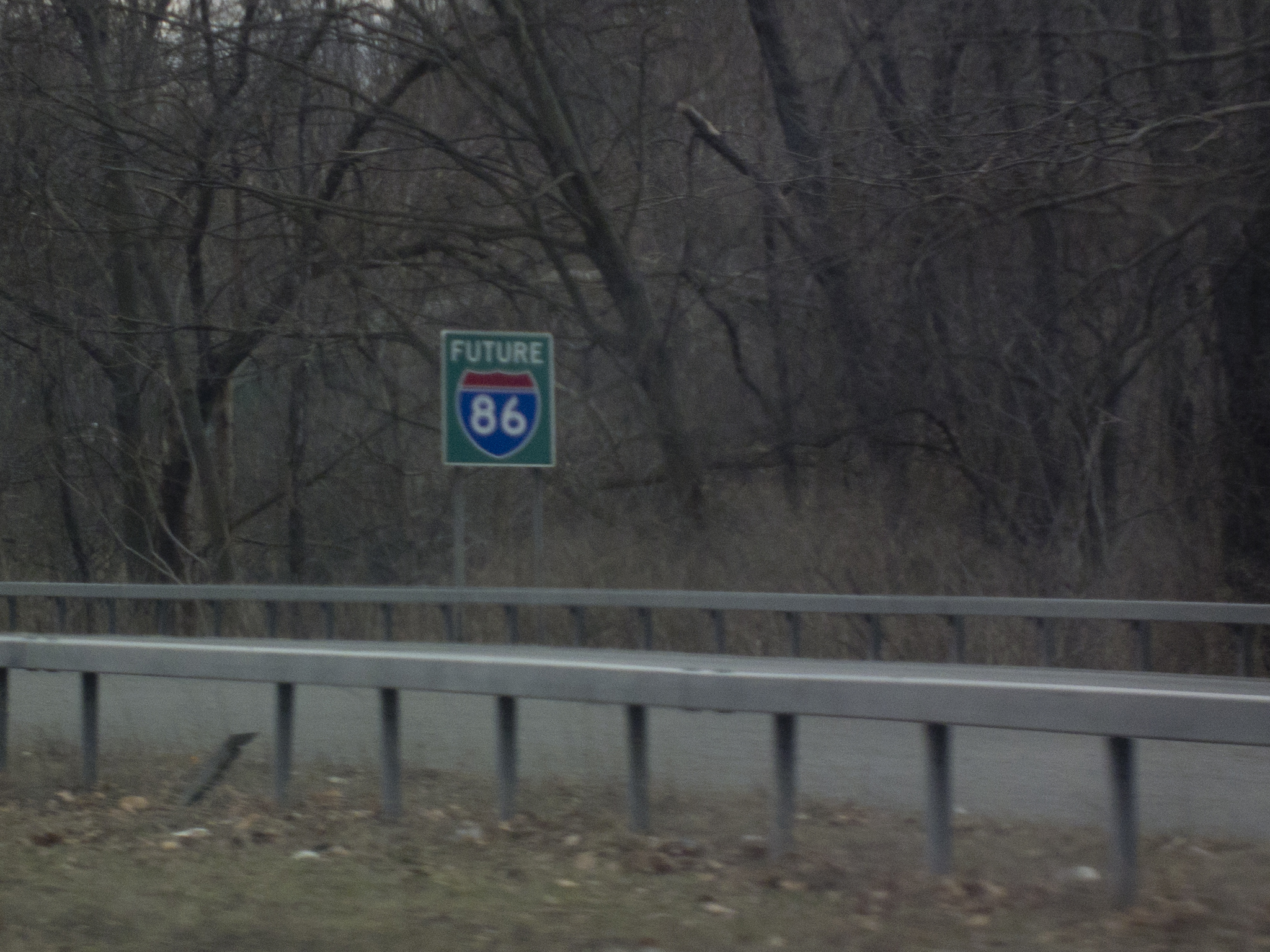
A sign indicating NY 17's transition to I-86 near Goshen

In 1998, Governor George Pataki signed legislation to convert the entirety of NY 17 to an interstate and stated that the conversion would be fully completed by 2009. However, a severe lack of funding has pushed the completion date back. The designation on this segment cannot be applied before NYSDOT completes the Prospect Mountain construction project at the junction of I-81, US 11, NY 17, and NY 7 in Binghamton, which when complete will bring the roadway up to Interstate Highway standards. The official completion of the project was set for December 2020. The project has since been completed, but as of February 2022, the segment is still not officially designated as I-86.

Work on converting the portion of the highway east of Windsor is expected to be far more substantial than the work west of Binghamton. Aside from numerous minor interchange improvements, major work includes constructing two new interchanges in the mountainous Hale Eddy area, exits 85 and 86, to replace two at-grade intersections, as well as the relocation of driveways in that area, improving curve radiuses throughout the route, and widening the shoulders on narrow parts of the highway. Work was completed in November 2019 on a redesigned interchange at exit 131, where NY 17 meets I-87 and NY 32. Construction to bring exits 124 and 125 in Goshen up to Interstate standards, with the latter being a brand new exit, was expected to be completed in early 2020, but was delayed. In December 2020, NYSDOT completed construction of the new exit 125, which was built to accommodate the new Legoland New York. As part of the project, a four-ramp parclo was built, which replaced the prior exit 125, located 4,000 feet (1.2 km) west. NY 17 was also expanded to three lanes in each direction between exits 124 and 125. Harriman Drive was expanded to two lanes in each direction between the exit and Legoland's entrance as well. Exit 122 has also been upgraded to interstate standards. There is no timetable for the full completion of the I-86 conversion between NY 79 in Windsor and the thruway (I-87) in Harriman. Nevertheless, the segment between Bloomingburg and Goshen is signed as I-86 and NY 17 despite not officially being part of I-86.

In October 2022, Governor Kathy Hochul announced that a draft environmental impact statement on upgrading Route 17 to transform it into Interstate 86 was underway, public outreach was expected early in 2023, and that up to $1 billion was available for the work.

== Exit list ==
Pennsylvania uses milepost-based exit numbers on its Interstate Highways; other I-86 exits are numbered sequentially.

State	County	Location	mi	km	Old exit	New exit	Destinations	Notes
Pennsylvania	Erie	Greenfield Township	0.00	0.00		1	I-90 – Erie, Buffalo	Western terminus; signed as exits 1A (west) and 1B (east); exit 37 on I-90
Pennsylvania	Erie	Greenfield Township	3.73	6.00	2	3	PA 89 – Wattsburg, North East	
Pennsylvania–New York state line			7.00 0.00	11.27 0.00	NY 17 begins			
New York	Chautauqua	Mina	1.07	1.72		4	NY 426 – Findley Lake	
New York	Chautauqua	Village of Sherman	9.22	14.84		6	NY 76 – Sherman	
New York	Chautauqua	North Harmony	15.42	24.82		7	Panama, Chautauqua Institution	Access via CR 33
New York	Chautauqua	North Harmony	18.93	30.46		8	NY 394 – Mayville, Lakewood	
New York	Chautauqua	North Harmony–Ellery line	19.59	31.53	Chautauqua Lake; Chautauqua County Veterans Memorial Bridge			
New York	Chautauqua	Ellery	20.29	32.65		9	NY 430 east – Bemus Point	Eastbound exit and westbound entrance
New York	Chautauqua	Ellery	20.36	32.77		10	To NY 430 – Bemus Point, Long Point State Park, Midway State Park	Left exit and entrance eastbound; access via NY 954J; Bemus Point not signed eastbound
New York	Chautauqua	Ellicott	26.31	42.34		11	Strunk Road (NY 953B)	
New York	Chautauqua	Ellicott	28.09	45.21		12	NY 60 – Jamestown	
New York	Chautauqua	Ellicott	30.79	49.55		13	NY 394 – Falconer	
New York	Chautauqua	Poland	36.04	58.00		14	US 62 – Kennedy, Warren, PA	
New York	Cattaraugus	Randolph	39.43	63.46		15	School House Road (NY 953A)	
New York	Cattaraugus	Randolph	41.48	66.76		16	West Main Street (NY 952M) – Randolph, Gowanda	
New York	Cattaraugus	Coldspring	47.98	77.22		17	NY 394 west – Steamburg, Onoville	Eastern terminus of NY 394; access to Onoville via NY 950A
New York	Cattaraugus	Coldspring	50.02	80.50	Allegheny Reservoir			
New York	Cattaraugus	Coldspring	50.73	81.64		18	NY 280 – Allegany State Park, Quaker Run Area	
New York	Cattaraugus	Red House	54.56	87.81		19	Allegany State Park, Red House Area	
New York	Cattaraugus	City of Salamanca	58.26	93.76		20	NY 417 to NY 353 – Salamanca	
New York	Cattaraugus	City of Salamanca	60.58	97.49		21	US 219 north (NY 417) – Salamanca	Western end of US 219 concurrency
New York	Cattaraugus	Carrollton	67.67	108.90		23	US 219 south / US 219 Bus. north – Limestone, Bradford PA	Eastern end of US 219 concurrency; US 219 Bus. not signed
New York	Cattaraugus	Carrollton	68.26	109.85	Allegheny River			
New York	Cattaraugus	Town of Allegany	74.22	119.45		24	To NY 417 – Allegany, St. Bonaventure University	Access via West Five Mile Road
New York	Cattaraugus	Olean	77.45	124.64		25	Buffalo Street (NY 954E) – Olean	
New York	Cattaraugus	Olean	78.94	127.04		26	NY 16 – Olean	
New York	Cattaraugus	Hinsdale	84.86	136.57		27	NY 16 to NY 446 – Hinsdale	
New York	Allegany	Village of Cuba	91.52	147.29		28	NY 305 – Cuba	
New York	Allegany	Friendship	98.89	159.15		29	NY 275 – Friendship, Bolivar	
New York	Allegany	Amity	104.60	168.34		30	NY 19 – Belmont, Wellsville	
New York	Allegany	Village of Angelica	108.70	174.94		31	Angelica	Access via Peacock Hill Road
New York	Allegany	West Almond	115.92	186.56		32	CR 2 – West Almond	
New York	Allegany	Village of Almond	123.65	199.00		33	To NY 21 – Almond, Andover	Access via NY 962A
New York	Steuben	Hornellsville	128.10	206.16	Canisteo River			
New York	Steuben	Hornellsville	128.35	206.56		34	NY 36 – Hornell, Arkport	Signed as exits 34A (south) and 34B (north)
New York	Steuben	Howard	138.01	222.11		35	CR 70 – Howard	Access via NY 962B
New York	Steuben	Avoca	145.10	233.52		36	I-390 north – Rochester, Buffalo	Buffalo not signed eastbound; southern terminus of I-390
New York	Steuben	Bath	146.35	235.53		37	NY 53 – Kanona, Prattsburgh	
New York	Steuben	Village of Bath	149.54	240.66		38	NY 54 north (NY 415) – Bath, Hammondsport	Southern terminus of NY 54
New York	Steuben	Bath	152.72	245.78		39	To NY 415 – Bath	Access via NY 960U
New York	Steuben	Savona	156.48	251.83		40	NY 226 – Savona	
New York	Steuben	Campbell	161.23	259.47		41	CR 333 – Campbell	
New York	Steuben	Campbell	164.60	264.90		42	CR 26 north – Coopers Plains	Access to Coopers Plains via NY 960M; southern terminus of CR 26
New York	Steuben	Erwin	167.56	269.66		43	NY 415 – Painted Post	
New York	Steuben	Erwin	168.65	271.42		44A	I-99 south / US 15 south / Robert Dann Drive – Williamsport	Robert Dann Drive not signed eastbound; northern terminus and exits 12-13A on I-99
New York	Steuben	Erwin	168.65	271.42		44B	NY 417 – Painted Post, Gang Mills	
New York	Steuben	Riverside	169.60	272.94		45	NY 352 east / NY 415 – Riverside, Downtown Corning	Signed for NY 352 eastbound, NY 415 westbound; western terminus of NY 352
New York	Steuben	City of Corning	171.55	276.08		46	NY 414 – Corning, Watkins Glen	Access to Corning Museum of Glass
New York	Steuben	Town of Corning	174.19	280.33		47	NY 352 – Gibson, East Corning	Access via NY 961Q
New York	Steuben	Town of Corning	176.57	284.16		48	NY 352 – East Corning	
New York	Chemung	Big Flats	178.84	287.82		49	Big Flats	Access via Bridge Street
New York	Chemung	Big Flats	180.60	290.65		50	CR 63 (Kahler Road) – Elmira/Corning Airport	
New York	Chemung	Big Flats	182.31	293.40		51A	Chambers Road – Shopping Malls	
New York	Chemung	Big Flats	182.31	293.40		51B	Colonial Drive – Shopping Malls	Westbound exit only
New York	Chemung	Village of Horseheads	183.91– 184.39	295.97– 296.75		52A	Commerce Center Road (CR 64 west)	Eastbound exit and entrance
New York	Chemung	Village of Horseheads	183.91– 184.39	295.97– 296.75		52A	NY 14 north / CR 64 – Watkins Glen	Westbound exit and entrance
New York	Chemung	Village of Horseheads	183.91– 184.39	295.97– 296.75		52B	NY 14 / CR 64 east – Elmira Heights, Watkins Glen	Eastbound exit and entrance
New York	Chemung	Village of Horseheads	183.91– 184.39	295.97– 296.75		52B	NY 14 south – Elmira Heights	Westbound exit only
New York	Chemung	Village of Horseheads	185.28	298.18		53	Horseheads	Access via Grand Central Avenue
New York	Chemung	Horseheads	186.04	299.40		54	NY 13 – Ithaca, Horseheads	Horseheads not signed eastbound
New York	Chemung	Elmira	190.20	306.10	56-57	56	NY 352 west – Elmira, Jerusalem Hill	Eastern terminus of NY 352
New York	Chemung	Ashland	196.00	315.43	58	57	CR 2 / CR 8 / CR 60 – Lowman, Wellsburg	
New York	Chemung	Chemung	197.96	318.59		58	CR 60 – Lowman	
New York	Chemung	Chemung	201.24	323.86		59	NY 427 west – Chemung	Eastern terminus of NY 427
New York	Chemung	Chemung	203.51	327.52		59A	Wilawana, PA	Access via White Wagon Road
Chemung River			205.04	329.98	Chemung–Tioga county line			
			205.40	330.56	New York–Pennsylvania state line			
Pennsylvania	Bradford	South Waverly	205.51	330.74		60	US 220 south – Waverly, Sayre	Maintained by NYSDOT; northern terminus of US 220
			205.60	330.88	Pennsylvania–New York state line			
New York	Tioga	Waverly	206.44	332.23		61	NY 34 north / PA 199 south – Waverly, Sayre, PA	Southern terminus of NY 34; northern terminus of PA 199
New York	Tioga	Nichols	214.53	345.25		62	NY 282 – Nichols	
New York	Tioga	Nichols	219.26	352.86		63	Lounsberry	Access via CR 509
New York	Tioga	Village of Owego				64	NY 96 north – Owego, Ithaca	Eastbound exit and entrance; southern terminus of NY 96
New York	Tioga	Village of Owego				64	To NY 96 – Owego, Ithaca	Westbound exit and entrance; access via NY 434
New York	Tioga	Town of Owego	225.50	362.91		65	NY 434 to NY 17C – Owego	Access to NY 17C via NY 960J
New York	Tioga	Town of Owego	230.99	371.74		66	NY 434 to NY 17C – Apalachin, Campville	Access to NY 17C via NY 962J
New York	Broome	Vestal	237.00	381.41		67	NY 26 to NY 434 – Vestal, Endicott	Signed as exits 67S (south) and 67N (north)
New York	Broome	Vestal	237.00	381.41		–	NY 17 east – Binghamton	Continuation east; eastern end of NY 17 concurrency
New York	Broome	Gap in designation; see NY 17						
New York	Broome	Binghamton	244.78	393.94		72B	US 11 (Front Street) – Downtown Binghamton	Eastbound exit only
New York	Broome	Binghamton	244.91	394.14		72A	I-81 north to I-88 east (NY 7 east) – Syracuse, Albany	Western end of I-81/NY 17 concurrency; next 3 exits numbers follow I-81; exit 13A on I-81
New York	Broome	Binghamton	245.39	394.92		12	NY 7 – Binghamton, Port Dickinson	Access to NY 363 and Downtown Binghamton
New York	Broome	Binghamton	245.78	395.54		11	Broad Avenue	Westbound exit and eastbound entrance
New York	Broome	Kirkwood	249.07	400.84		9	To US 11 – Industrial Park	Eastbound exit and westbound entrance; access via Colesville Road
New York	Broome	Kirkwood	249.62	401.72		75	I-81 north / NY 17 west – Binghamton I-81 south to US 11 – Scranton, Industrial Park	Access to US 11 via NY 990G; exit 8A on I-81
New York	Broome	Kirkwood	251.31	404.44		76	Haskins Road / Foley Road	
New York	Broome	Windsor	253.00	407.16		77	Windsor	Access via CR 217
New York	Broome	Windsor	256.25	412.39		78	Dunbar Road – Occanum	
New York	Broome	Village of Windsor	259.64	417.85		79	NY 79 – Windsor	
New York	Broome	Village of Windsor	259.64	417.85		–	NY 17 east – New York City	Eastern end of NY 17 concurrency; continuation east
1.000 mi = 1.609 km; 1.000 km = 0.621 mi: Concurrency terminus; Incomplete access
