= New York State Route 283 (1930–1970) =

Former state highway in New York State

New York State Route 283

- Map of Tioga County with NY 283 highlighted in red and its pre-1949 extension to Pennsylvania in pink

Route information
- Maintained by NYSDOT
- Length: 7.74 mi (Note: Excludes abandoned section near Owego.) (12.46 km)
- Existed: 1930–January 1, 1970

Major junctions
- West end: NY 282 in Nichols
- East end: NY 17 in Owego

Location
- Country: United States
- State: New York
- Counties: Tioga

Highway system
- New York Highways; Interstate; US; State; Reference; Parkways
← NY 282	→ NY 283

New York State Route 283 (NY 283) was an east–west state highway located within Tioga County in the Southern Tier of New York in the United States. It ran along the south bank of the Susquehanna River from an intersection with NY 282 in the village of Nichols to a junction with NY 17 (now NY 96 and NY 434) in the village of Owego. The route was assigned as part of the 1930 renumbering of state highways in New York as a Pennsylvania–Owego route. NY 283 was truncated to Nichols in 1949 and eliminated in 1970. Its former routing is now mostly maintained by Tioga County as part of several county routes.

== Route description ==
NY 283 began at an intersection with NY 282 in the village of Nichols, located on the southern bank of the Susquehanna River in south-central Tioga County. The route headed to the east as East River Drive, crossing over Wappasening Creek as it left the village limits. From here, the route took on a more northeasterly course, following the east side of a deep, rural valley surrounding the Susquehanna River. About 3 miles (4.8 km) from Nichols, the highway entered the small hamlet of Lounsberry, located just south of NY 283's junction with Stanton Hill Road (County Route 54 or CR 54). NY 283 continued northeast from the community, closely following the riverbank and the south edge of the encompassing valley to the village of Owego. The route served a mostly undeveloped area of the village before ending at a junction with NY 17 across the river from Owego's central business district.

== History ==
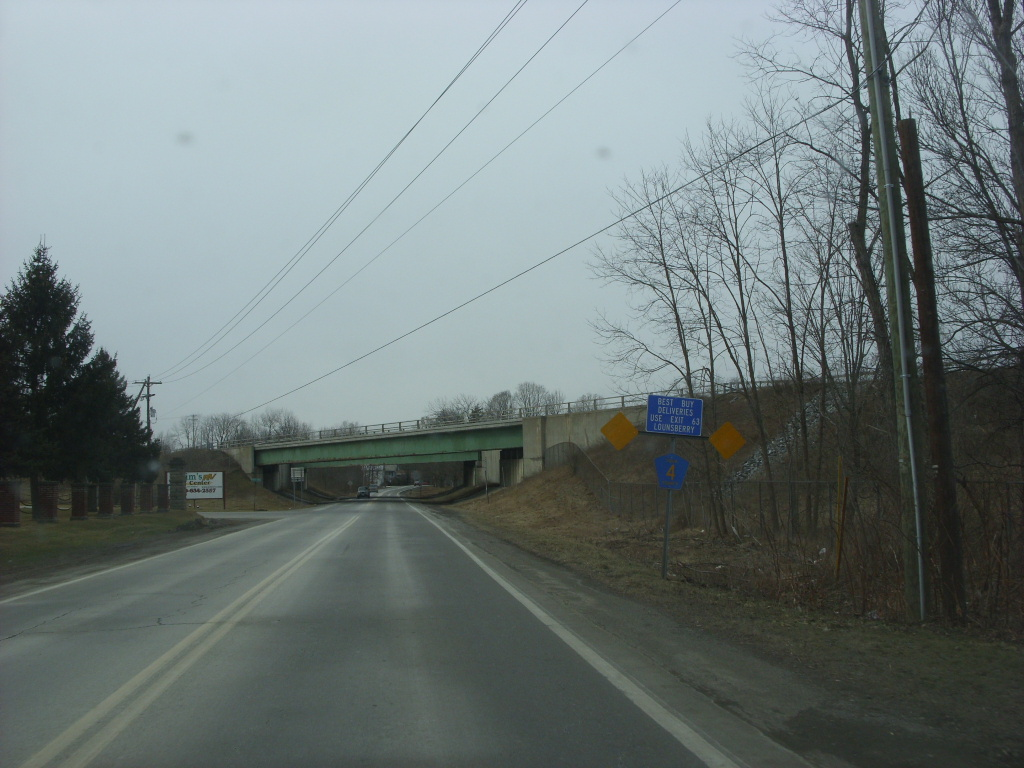
CR 4 approaching the Southern Tier Expressway. Until 1949, this section of highway was part of NY 283

NY 283 was assigned as part of the 1930 renumbering of state highways in New York, extending from the Pennsylvania state line southwest of the village of Nichols to NY 17 in the village of Owego. The route also served the village of Nichols, through which it overlapped with NY 282. Although it was signed as a state route, the parts of NY 283 that did not overlap NY 282 were initially locally maintained. On January 1, 1949, NY 283 was truncated to begin at the east end of its overlap with NY 282 in Nichols. The remaining route from Nichols to Owego was split into two segments in the late 1960s as part of the Southern Tier Expressway's construction. About 2 miles (3.2 km) west of Owego, NY 283 ran along a narrow 4,000-foot (1,200 m) strip of land between the Susquehanna River to the north and a steep hill to the south. This section of NY 283 was abandoned to allow the linear strip to be used for the expressway's right of way. As a result, the NY 283 designation was removed on January 1, 1970.

As part of a 1966 agreement, most of NY 283's former routing is now maintained by Tioga County as part of several county routes. From the Pennsylvania state line to NY 282 in Nichols, old NY 283 is CR 4. After a brief state-maintained stretch as part of NY 282, the former routing of NY 283 continues as CR 6 to a dead end where the road was dismantled for the Southern Tier Expressway. The old route resumes about 1 mile (1.6 km) to the east as a town-maintained section of East River Drive, which feeds into CR 25 at its east end. CR 25 picks up what was once NY 283 and follows it into the village of Owego, connecting to NY 17 exit 64. At this point, the road becomes state-maintained again as part of NY 96, which uses old NY 283 to reach NY 434 and the Susquehanna River bridge leading to the center of the village.

== Major intersections ==
The entire route was in Tioga County.

Location	mi	km	Destinations	Notes
Village of Nichols	0.00	0.00	NY 282	
Village of Owego	7.74	12.46	NY 17	Now NY 96 and NY 434
1.000 mi = 1.609 km; 1.000 km = 0.621 mi

== See also ==
- List of county routes in Tioga County, New York
