= New York State Route 283 (disambiguation) =

New York State Route 283 is an east–west state highway in Jefferson County, New York, United States, that was established in the 1980s.

New York State Route 283 may also refer to:

- New York State Route 283 (1930–1970) in Tioga County
- New York State Route 283 (1970s) in Jefferson County
