= Platt-Cady Mansion =

Historic house in New York, United States

- U.S. National Register of Historic Places
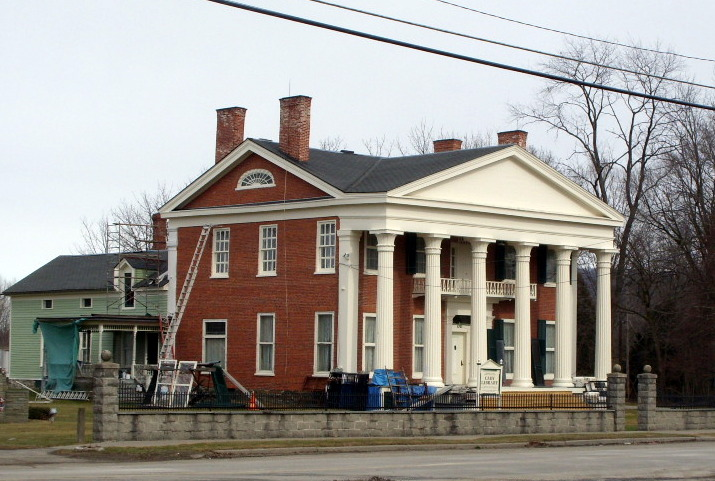
- Platt-Cady Mansion, February 2009

- Location within New York Location within the United States
- Location: 18 River St., Nichols, New York
- Coordinates: 42°1′19″N 76°22′0″W
- Area: less than one acre
- Built: 1827
- Architectural style: Greek Revival, Federal
- NRHP reference No.: 76001286
- Added to NRHP: August 13, 1976

Platt-Cady Mansion is a historic home located at Nichols in Tioga County, New York. The original Federal structure was constructed about 1827. It is a large two-story brick mansion, modified at a later date with a visually dominant columned portico in the Greek Revival style. Also on the property is a large two-story carriage-and-horse barn. The Cady Library has occupied the building since 1941.

It was listed on the National Register of Historic Places in 1976.
