= Nichols (village), New York =

Nichols, New York
- Village
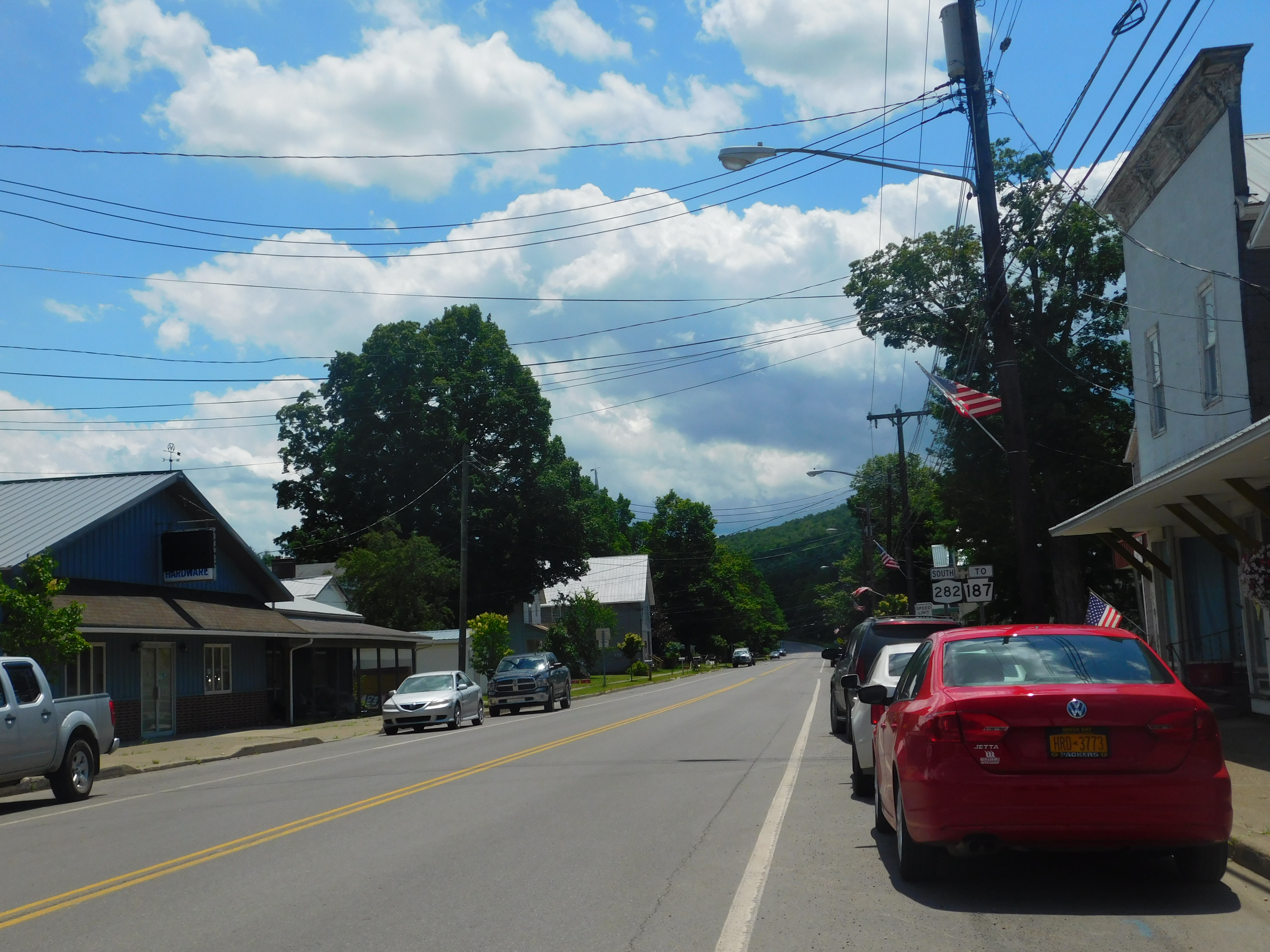
- Nichols village on New York State Route 282.

- Location within the state of New York
- Coordinates: 42°1′12″N 76°22′7″W
- Country: United States
- State: New York
- County: Tioga
- Settled: 1793
- Incorporated: 1903
- Named after: Early landowner

Area
  - Total: 0.52 sq mi (1.34 km^{2})
  - Land: 0.52 sq mi (1.34 km^{2})
  - Water: 0 sq mi (0.00 km^{2})
- Elevation: 791 ft (241 m)

Population (2020)
  - Total: 457
  - Density: 881.5/sq mi (340.35/km^{2})
- Time zone: UTC-5 (Eastern (EST))
  - Summer (DST): UTC-4 (EDT)
- ZIP code: 13812
- Area code: 607
- FIPS code: 36-51110
- GNIS feature ID: 0958556
- Website: villageofnicholsny.gov

Nichols is a village located in the Town of Nichols in Tioga County, New York, United States. The population was 512 at the 2010 census. It is part of the Binghamton Metropolitan Statistical Area. The name is taken from that of a local benefactor, Colonel Nichols.

The Village of Nichols is on the northern border of the town and is in the Southern Tier District of New York. Nichols is halfway between Binghamton and Elmira.

== History ==
The Sullivan Expedition of 1779 passed through the region.

The village was settled around 1793 and was originally called the "Corners." The community was briefly known as "Rushville," but the name was changed to "Nichols" when the Tioga County was created.

The Nichols High School and Platt-Cady Mansion are listed on the National Register of Historic Places.

== Geography ==
Nichols is located at 42°1′11″N 76°22′6″W (42.019986, -76.368505).

According to the United States Census Bureau, the village has a total area of 0.5 square mile (1.3 km^{2}), all land.

The Susquehanna River flows past the northern side of the village. Wapasening Creek flows into the river at Nichols village.

The Southern Tier Expressway (New York State Route 17 and future Interstate 86) and New York State Route 282 pass through the village.

== Demographics ==
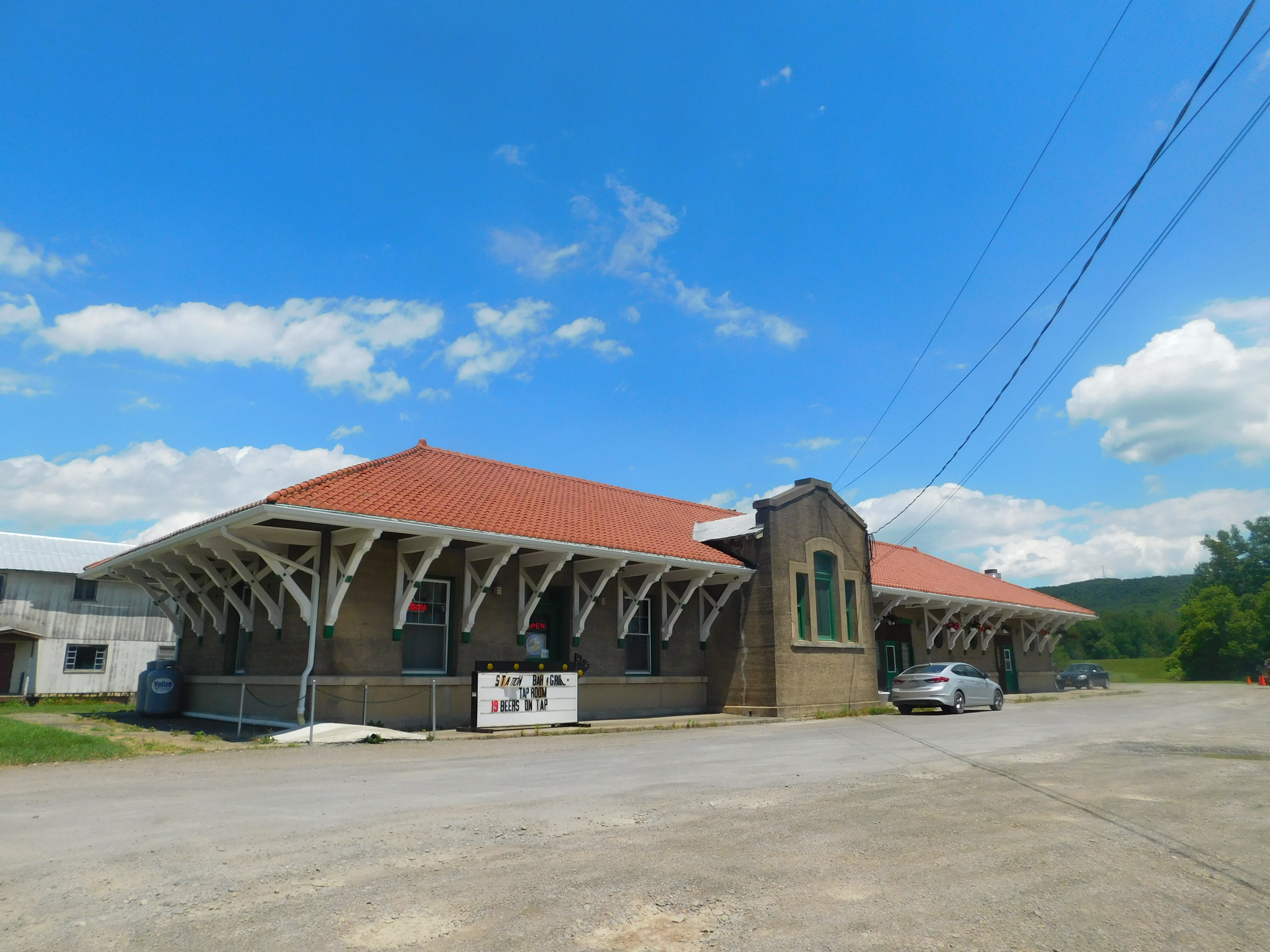
The former Delaware, Lackawanna and Western Railroad station in Nichols

Historical population
Census	Pop.	Note	%±
1910	533		—
1920	554		3.9%
1930	533		−3.8%
1940	541		1.5%
1950	578		6.8%
1960	663		14.7%
1970	638		−3.8%
1980	613		−3.9%
1990	573		−6.5%
2000	574		0.2%
2010	512		−10.8%
2020	457		−10.7%
US Decennial Census

As of the census of 2000, there were 574 people, 213 households, and 152 families residing in the village. The population density was 1,123.9 inhabitants per square mile (433.9/km^{2}). There were 228 housing units at an average density of 446.4 per square mile (172.4/km^{2}). The racial makeup of the village was 99.65% White, 0.17% Black or African American and 0.17% Asian. Hispanic or Latino of any race were 0.70% of the population.

There were 213 households, out of which 38.0% had children under the age of 18 living with them, 53.5% were married couples living together, 11.7% had a female householder with no husband present, and 28.2% were non-families. 24.4% of all households were made up of individuals, and 15.5% had someone living alone who was 65 years of age or older. The average household size was 2.69 and the average family size was 3.08.

In the village, the population was spread out, with 31.4% under the age of 18, 6.1% from 18 to 24, 28.2% from 25 to 44, 19.9% from 45 to 64, and 14.5% who were 65 years of age or older. The median age was 35 years. For every 100 females, there were 92.6 males. For every 100 females age 18 and over, there were 87.6 males.

The median income for a household in the village was $38,864, and the median income for a family was $41,667. Males had a median income of $27,361 versus $23,750 for females. The per capita income for the village was $14,060. About 10.5% of families and 15.0% of the population were below the poverty line, including 19.5% of those under age 18 and 6.5% of those age 65 or over.

== Education ==
It is within the Tioga Central School District..
