= Tioga Central High School =

High school in New York, United States

Coordinates: 42.0580°N 76.3516°W

Information
- School district: Tioga Central School District
- NCES District ID: 3628710
- Colors: Blue and gold
- Mascot: Tiger
- Team name: Tigers
- Website: www.tiogacentral.org/tiogacentralhighschool_home.aspx

Tioga Central High School is a public comprehensive senior high school in Tioga Center, New York. It is currently the only high school in the Tioga Central School District.

In December 2025, the school's football team won the New York State Public High School Athletic Association (NYSPHSAA) championship.

== School facts ==
School colors: Blue and Gold

Team name: Tigers

Mascot: Tiger
