= Tioga Central School District =

School district in New York, United States

Address
- 3 Fifth Avenue Tioga Center, New York, 13845; United States

District information
- Type: Public
- Grades: PreK–12
- NCES District ID: 3628710

Students and staff
- Students: 924
- Teachers: 75.5
- Staff: 71.4
- Student–teacher ratio: 12.24

Other information
- Website: www.tiogacentral.org

Tioga Central School District is a school district headquartered in Tioga Center, New York. School colors are Blue & Gold. The school mascot is a tiger.

== Schools ==
- Tioga Central High School
- Tioga Middle School
- Tioga Elementary School
