= Lounsberry, New York =

Lounsberry
- hamlet
- Location of Lounsberry in New York
- Coordinates: 42°03′29″N 76°20′09″W
- Country: United States
- State: New York
- County: Tioga

Lounsberry is a hamlet within the town of Nichols in Tioga County, New York, United States. It was formerly known as Canfield Corners. The most notable feature is a Best Buy distribution center, the largest employer in the town of Nichols.

== History ==
Benjamin Lounsberry, Jr. moved to the Nichols area along with the family of Jonathan Platt, who had married the widowed mother of Mr. Lounsberry. After marrying Elizabeth Platt, the two had nine children. The propagation of this family in the area peaked in the late 19th century at the sum of some 30 households bearing the surname Lounsberry, leading to the area being referred to as "Lounsberry.", There remains in Lounsberry one family bearing the historic surname.

Lounsberry was also served by the main line of the Delaware, Lackawanna and Western Railroad at least through 1903.

Lounsberry is the site of two New York State Historic Markers in Tioga County, one marking the Hamlet and another marking the spot of a pre-1800 ferry crossing to Tioga Center.

On Thursday, September 8, 2011, Lounsberry was greatly affected by the flooding of the Susquehanna River with many residents losing their homes.
