= Wappasening Creek =

River in the United States of America

Coordinates: 42°1′28″N 76°21′43″W

Wappasening Creek is a 19.8-mile-long (31.9 km) tributary of the Susquehanna River in New York and Pennsylvania in the United States.

It rises in the southwest corner of Bradford County, Pennsylvania south of Canton, and flows east.

Wappasening Creek flows out of Bradford County into New York to join the Susquehanna approximately 9 miles (14 km) above the borough of Sayre, Pennsylvania.

== See also ==
- List of rivers of New York
- List of rivers of Pennsylvania
