= Nichols, New York =

Nichols
- Town
- Location of Nichols in New York
- Coordinates: 42°01′20″N 76°22′13″W
- Country: United States
- State: New York
- County: Tioga

Area
  - Total: 34.66 sq mi (89.78 km^{2})
  - Land: 33.73 sq mi (87.35 km^{2})
  - Water: 0.94 sq mi (2.43 km^{2})

Population (2020)
  - Total: 2,357 ▼
  - Estimate (2021): 2,328
  - Density: 72.4/sq mi (27.94/km^{2})
- FIPS code: 36-107-51121
- Website: https://townofnicholsny.gov/

Nichols is a town in Tioga County, New York, United States. The town contains a village also called Nichols. The town is on the south border of both the county and the state. The town is halfway between Binghamton and Elmira. The population was 2,357 at the 2020 census. The town is named after Colonel Nichols, an early landowner.

== History ==
The Sullivan Expedition of 1779 passed through the area, destroying the native settlements of those who sided with the British against America in the Revolutionary War. The first permanent settlers arrived before 1787, but they were regarded as squatters by the first official settler, who arrived circa 1791.

The town of Nichols was established in 1824 from part of the town of Tioga.

== Geography ==
According to the United States Census Bureau, the town has a total area of 34.7 square miles (89.8 km^{2}), of which 33.7 square miles (87.3 km^{2}) is land and 1.0 square mile (2.5 km^{2}) (2.77%) is water.

The Susquehanna River marks the northern town boundary and the southern town line is the state line of Pennsylvania.

The Southern Tier Expressway (New York State Route 17 and future Interstate 86) passes across the town south of the Susquehanna River. New York State Route 282 connects NY-17 to the Pennsylvania state line.

== Demographics ==
Historical population
Census	Pop.	Note	%±
1830	1,283		—
1840	1,986		54.8%
1850	1,905		−4.1%
1860	1,932		1.4%
1870	1,663		−13.9%
1880	1,709		2.8%
1890	1,701		−0.5%
1900	1,564		−8.1%
1910	1,466		−6.3%
1920	1,392		−5.0%
1930	1,407		1.1%
1940	1,481		5.3%
1950	1,685		13.8%
1960	1,998		18.6%
1970	2,271		13.7%
1980	2,567		13.0%
1990	2,525		−1.6%
2000	2,584		2.3%
2010	2,525		−2.3%
2020	2,357		−6.7%
2021 (est.)	2,328	▼	−1.2%
U.S. Decennial Census

As of the census of 2000, there were 2,584 people, 966 households, and 723 families residing in the town. The population density was 76.7 inhabitants per square mile (29.6/km^{2}). There were 1,033 housing units at an average density of 30.7 per square mile (11.9/km^{2}). The racial makeup of the town was 99.03% White, 0.39% Black or African American, 0.19% Asian, 0.04% Pacific Islander, and 0.35% from two or more races. Hispanic or Latino of any race were 0.81% of the population.

There were 966 households, out of which 35.2% had children under the age of 18 living with them, 58.8% were married couples living together, 9.9% had a female householder with no husband present, and 25.1% were non-families. 20.4% of all households were made up of individuals, and 9.4% had someone living alone who was 65 years of age or older. The average household size was 2.67 and the average family size was 3.04.

In the town, the population was spread out, with 27.9% under the age of 18, 6.2% from 18 to 24, 28.3% from 25 to 44, 24.3% from 45 to 64, and 13.3% who were 65 years of age or older. The median age was 38 years. For every 100 females, there were 97.7 males. For every 100 females age 18 and over, there were 95.3 males.

The median income for a household in the town was $37,372, and the median income for a family was $38,558. Males had a median income of $30,824 versus $22,375 for females. The per capita income for the town was $15,728. About 9.8% of families and 13.6% of the population were below the poverty line, including 18.8% of those under age 18 and 6.2% of those age 65 or over.

== Communities and locations in the Town of Nichols ==
- Briggs Hollow – A hamlet in the southeastern part of the town, and the name of a small valley in which the community is located.
- East Nichols – A location in the southeastern corner of the town.
- Hoopers Valley – A riverside hamlet east of Waverly village on NY-17.
- Litchfield – A riverside hamlet at the western town line on NY-17.
- Lounsberry – A hamlet northeast of Waverly village on NY-17. It was formerly called Canfield Corners.
- Nichols – A village on the south side of the Susquehanna River at NY-17.
- Squaw Island – An island in the Susquehanna River in the northeastern part of the town.
- Tioga Downs – A casino built in 2006. Features horse racing in the summer months.
- Tuffs Island – An island in the Susquehanna River in the northeastern part of the town.
- Wapasening Creek – A stream flowing into the Susquehanna River by Nichols village.
