= Tioga Center, New York =

- Hamlet
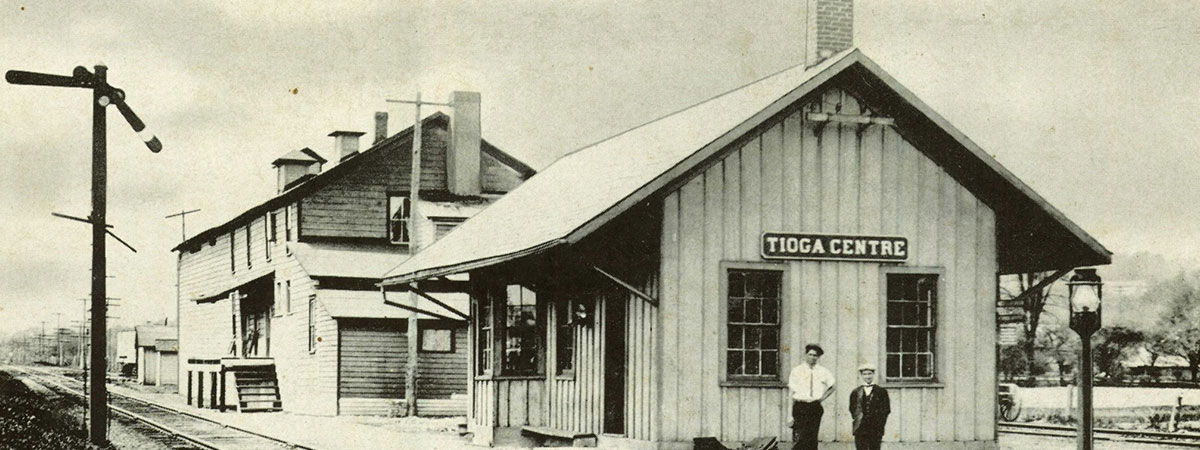
- Tioga Centre railway station

- Location within New York Location within the United States
- Coordinates: 42°03′22″N 76°20′53″W
- Country: United States
- State: New York
- County: Tioga
- Elevation: 797 ft (243 m)
- Time zone: UTC-5 (Eastern (EST))
  - Summer (DST): UTC-4 (EDT)
- ZIP code: 13845
- Area code: 607
- GNIS feature ID: 967551

Tioga Center is a hamlet in Tioga County, New York, United States. The community is located along the Susquehanna River and New York State Route 17C, 5.5 miles (8.9 km) southwest of Owego. Tioga Center has a post office with ZIP code 13845, which opened on February 2, 1835.

Tioga Central School District operates public schools including Tioga Central High School.

== See also ==
- Tioga, Pennsylvania
