= Tioga Downs =

Equestrian racetrack and casino in Nichols, NY

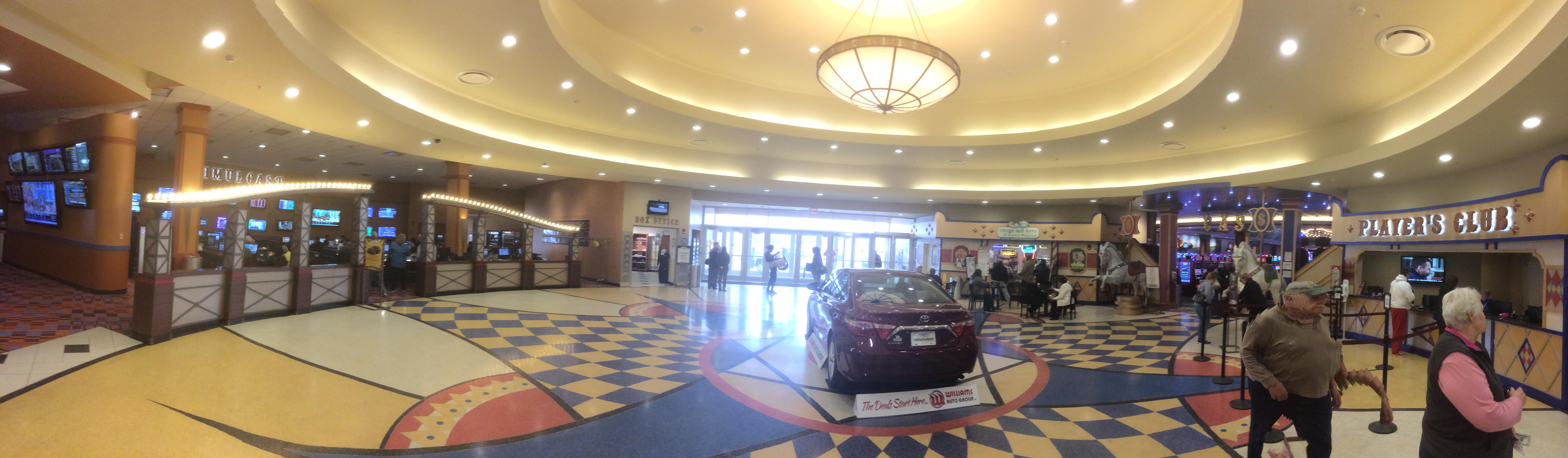
- A panoramic view of the main lobby of Tioga Downs
- Interactive map of Tioga Downs
- Location: Nichols, New York; 2384 West River Road, Nichols, NY 13812; 42.025324°N 76.415749°W
- Opened: June 9, 2006
- Theme: County-Fair
- No. of rooms: 160
- Gaming space: 942 machines
- Notable restaurants: Carousel Bar; Coasters Sports Bar; Dunkin Donuts; Fin & Pho; County Fair Buffet; P.J. Clarke's
- Casino type: Racino
- Owner: Jeffrey Gural, CEO of American Racing and Entertainment, LLC; Scott Freeman, President and General Manager American Racing, Tom Murray Security Supervisor, Dave Miller, Director of Security, Graham Shanks F&B Supervisor, Katie Krapf Events Coordinator, Anita Wintermute EMT,
- Architect: CGL Architects
- Website: Tioga Downs Casino

Tioga Downs is a county-fair-themed standardbred racetrack (5/8 mile) and commercial casino located on a 138-acre (0.56 km^{2}) site in Nichols, New York.

== History ==
Tioga Downs originally was a quarterhorse track known as Tioga Park in 1976, closing down after its third season. James Nuckel, then owner, stated that, "the track had been losing thousands of dollars a day and was still in the red after three years of operation." Thereafter, a few private races and the occasional flea market were held at the location.

=== Revival ===
In 2000, Jeffrey Gural, a real-estate executive, horse owner, and racing enthusiast, began lobbying for state approval of Video Lottery Terminals (VLTs) at racetracks. In 2005, they were approved. Shortly after Gural, with partnership from Nevada Gold and Casinos, bought the old Tioga Park for $32 million. A ground-breaking ceremony was held July 22, 2005.

On June 9, 2006, Tioga Downs opened, offering harness racing, simulcast betting, and over 800 VLTs. Tioga Downs has two bars, a Subway restaurant, banquet room, coffee/bakery shop, and buffet. It also has a stage area, which hosts concerts. Artists that appeared at Tioga Downs have included Gretchen Wilson, Vanilla Ice, Tony Orlando, and Sister Sledge. During the warmer months, a trackside tent is available for wedding receptions, business meetings, parties, and awards' ceremonies. In 2011, The Tioga Downs Flea Market opened. In 2017, a hotel resort was added to the site.

== Gaming ==
Tioga Downs has over 900 VLTs, averaging ~92% payback. The racino offers player's club cards known as Tioga Rewards at five color-coded levels: Choice (red), Preferred (blue), Premier (silver), Elite (gold), and VIP (black). Outside the gaming room Quick Draw and instant lottery tickets are available. Inside the racino, keno, video poker, slot machines and table games are available. The largest slot progressive offered is typically $250,000+.

== Racing ==
Tioga Downs schedules racing between May and September, typically on Friday and Saturday evenings (6:50 PM), and 1:30 PM on Sundays. The track record is 1:48.1, set by two horses: Bettor Sweet, in 2011, and Pet Rock, in 2013.

== Financial history ==
Revenues from slot machines at Tioga Downs had increased steadily since opening in 2006. "Net wins" (defined as total credits wagered minus total credits won) was $30 million during the abbreviated fiscal year 2006–2007, $43 million 2007–2008, $48 million 2008–2009, $50 million 2009–2010, $54 million 2010–2011, $60 million 2011–2012, and peaked in 2012–2013 at $61 million. The first year-over-year decline was recorded in 2013–2014 with the net win estimated at $57 million. On average, each slot machine contributes ~$200 in revenue per day (New York Lottery, 2014).

== Expansion ==
The November 2013 voter approval of "Proposal One"—an amendment to the New York State Constitution allowing table games at a prescribed number of venues—allowed the State of New York to issue a limited number of licenses for Las Vegas-style casinos in upstate New York. Tioga Downs owner Jeff Gural applied for a license to expand Tioga Downs to become a full-fledged casino featuring table games. Gural's initial application was denied; however, Gov. Andrew Cuomo asked the New York State Gaming Facility Location Board to reconsider. In October 2015, the Board reversed its decision and issued a license to Tioga Downs. The expanded Tioga Downs opened in December 2016.

== Community Involvement ==
In March 2021, Tioga Downs Casino Resort and the Food Bank of the Southern Tier teamed up to give 5,000 families facing food insecurity ham dinners. These families, living throughout Broome, Chemung, Schuyler, Steuben, Tioga, and Tompkins counties, are able to celebrate Easter with plentiful food thanks to Tioga Downs and the Food Bank of the Southern Tier. Tioga Downs Casino Resort owner, Jeff Gural, presented the Food Bank of the Southern Tier with a $100,000 check during the event.
