= National Register of Historic Places listings in Chautauqua County, New York =

Location of Chautauqua County in New York

This is a list of the National Register of Historic Places listings in Chautauqua County, New York.

This is intended to be a complete list of properties and districts listed on the National Register of Historic Places in Chautauqua County, New York, United States. The locations of National Register properties and districts for which the latitude and longitude coordinates are included below, may be seen in a map.

There are 56 properties and districts listed on the National Register in the county, including 2 National Historic Landmarks.

This National Park Service list is complete through NPS recent listings posted August 7, 2026.

Contents: Counties in New York
Albany (Albany) – Allegany – Bronx – Broome – Cattaraugus – Cayuga – Chautauqua – Chemung – Chenango – Clinton – Columbia – Cortland – Delaware – Dutchess (Poughkeepsie, Rhinebeck) – Erie (Buffalo) – Essex – Franklin – Fulton – Genesee – Greene – Hamilton – Herkimer – Jefferson – Kings – Lewis – Livingston – Madison – Monroe (Rochester) – Montgomery – Nassau – New York (Below 14th Street, 14th to 59th Streets, 59th to 110th Streets, Above 110th Street, Islands) – Niagara (Niagara Falls) – Oneida – Onondaga (Syracuse) – Ontario – Orange – Orleans – Oswego – Otsego – Putnam – Queens – Rensselaer – Richmond – Rockland – St. Lawrence – Saratoga – Schenectady – Schoharie – Schuyler – Seneca – Steuben – Suffolk – Sullivan – Tioga – Tompkins – Ulster – Warren – Washington – Wayne – Westchester (Northern, Southern, New Rochelle, Peekskill, Yonkers) – Wyoming – Yates

== Current listings ==
	Name on the Register	Image	Date listed	Location	City or town	Description
1	Atwater-Stone House	Atwater-Stone House	December 16, 1983 (#83003887)	29 Water St. 42°19′08″N 79°34′46″W	Westfield	
2	Barcelona Lighthouse and Keeper's Cottage	Barcelona Lighthouse and Keeper's Cottage	April 13, 1972 (#72000825)	East Lake Rd. 42°20′28″N 79°35′43″W	Westfield	
3	Basilica of Saint Mary of the Angels Complex		June 10, 2026 (#100012708)	113, 118, 205, and 207 West Henley Street; 42°04′32″N 78°25′52″W	Olean	
4	L. Bliss House	L. Bliss House	September 26, 1983 (#83001647)	90 W. Main St. 42°19′09″N 79°34′54″W	Westfield	
5	Smith Bly House	Smith Bly House	October 1, 1974 (#74001223)	4 N. Maple St. 42°05′34″N 79°22′30″W	Ashville	
6	Brocton Arch	Brocton Arch	February 22, 1996 (#96000133)	Jct. of Main St. with Lake and Highland Aves. 42°23′19″N 79°26′28″W	Brocton	
7	Busti Mill	Busti Mill	July 23, 1976 (#76001208)	Lawson Rd. 42°02′02″N 79°16′52″W	Busti	
8	Harriet Campbell-Taylor House	Harriet Campbell-Taylor House	September 26, 1983 (#83001648)	145 S. Portage St. 42°18′52″N 79°34′27″W	Westfield	
9	Center and Pearl Streets Historic District		May 5, 2025 (#100012812)	Portions of Center, Pearl, and Lodi streets 42°28′12″N 79°10′26″W	Forestville	
10	Chautauqua Institution Historic District	Chautauqua Institution Historic District	June 19, 1973 (#73001168)	Bounded by Chautauqua Lake and NY 394; 42°12′33″N 79°28′02″W	Chautauqua	
11	Clymer District School No. 5	Clymer District School No. 5	August 29, 1994 (#94001004)	7929 Clymer Center Rd. (Co. Rt. 613); 42°03′17″N 79°34′57″W	Clymer	
12	Dunkirk Light	Dunkirk Light	July 19, 1984 (#84002067)	Dunkirk Harbor; 42°29′38″N 79°21′15″W	Dunkirk	
13	Dunkirk Macaroni & Supply Company Building		August 12, 2026 (#100013310)	23-25 East Lakeshore Drive; 42°29′15″N 79°20′04″W	Dunkirk	
14	Dunkirk Schooner Site		May 1, 2009 (#09000285)	Lake Erie; 42°33′00″N 79°36′00″W	Dunkirk	
15	East Main Street Historic District	East Main Street Historic District	December 16, 1983 (#83003893)	E. Main St. 42°19′33″N 79°34′09″W	Westfield	
16	Empire Worsted Mills	Empire Worsted Mills	January 30, 2020 (#100004916)	31 Water St. 42°05′37″N 79°13′53″W	Jamestown	Exemplary late 19th-century textile mill later used as hardware factory. Now Gateway Center, home of various community organizations
17	Erie Railroad Station	Erie Railroad Station	May 2, 2003 (#03000045)	211-217 W. Second St. 42°05′40″N 79°14′41″W	Jamestown	
18	Euclid Avenue School	Euclid Avenue School	March 21, 1985 (#85000628)	28 Euclid Ave. 42°06′30″N 79°14′24″W	Jamestown	
19	Fay-Usborne Mill	Fay-Usborne Mill	September 26, 1983 (#83001649)	48 Pearl St. 42°19′38″N 79°34′38″W	Westfield	
20	Gov. Reuben Fenton Mansion	Gov. Reuben Fenton Mansion	October 18, 1972 (#72000824)	68 S. Main St. 42°05′29″N 79°14′20″W	Jamestown	
21	First Presbyterian Church, Jamestown, New York		April 28, 2025 (#100011762)	509 Prendergast Avenue; 42°05′56″N 79°14′18″W	Jamestown	
22	Forest Heights Historic District	Forest Heights Historic District	September 18, 2020 (#100005570)	Forest Park, Warner Pl., Terrace Pl., Lilac Ln., McKinley Ave., 70-201 Forest Ave., 10-204 Prather Ave., 32-102 and 39-123 Prospect St., 117-153 South Main St., 6 and 11 Broadhead Ave., 67 Washington St. 42°05′22″N 79°14′24″W	Jamestown	Includes the Partridge-Sheldon House
23	Fredonia Commons Historic District	Fredonia Commons Historic District	October 19, 1978 (#78001843)	Main, Temple, Church, Day, and Center Sts. 42°26′25″N 79°19′55″W	Fredonia	
24	French Portage Road Historic District	French Portage Road Historic District	December 16, 1983 (#83003895)	E. Main and Portage Sts. 42°19′11″N 79°34′33″W	Westfield	
25	Frank A. Hall House	Frank A. Hall House	September 26, 1983 (#83001650)	34 Washington St. 42°19′31″N 79°34′41″W	Westfield	
26	Jamestown Armory	Jamestown Armory	January 12, 1995 (#94001542)	34 Porter Ave. 42°05′35″N 79°15′18″W	Jamestown	
27	Jamestown Downtown Historic District	Jamestown Downtown Historic District	November 19, 2014 (#14000935)	23-28, 20-408 N. Main, 200-322 Washington, 201-326 Cherry, 207-317 Pine, 215-417 Spring, 8-21, 100-200 E. 4th Sts. 42°05′47″N 79°14′29″W	Jamestown	Historic commercial core of small industrial city
28	Lake Shore & Michigan Southern Freight Depot	Lake Shore & Michigan Southern Freight Depot	September 26, 1983 (#83001651)	English St. 42°19′52″N 79°34′35″W	Westfield	
29	Lake Shore and Michigan Southern Railway Station	Lake Shore and Michigan Southern Railway Station	December 16, 1983 (#83003897)	English St. 42°19′41″N 79°34′56″W	Westfield	
30	Lakeview Avenue Historic District		March 13, 2017 (#100000753)	3-907 Lakeview & 55 Newton Aves., 500 E. 6th, 25-47 (odd) & 28 Liberty, 225 & 301 E. 8th, 7 Falconer, 18-19 Strong, Sts., 42°06′15″N 79°14′12″W	Jamestown	Late 19th-century residential neighborhood home to many of city's wealthier residents at that time
31	Lakewood Village Hall	Lakewood Village Hall	July 28, 2023 (#100009161)	20 West Summit St. 42°06′13″N 79°19′42″W	Lakewood	
32	Lily Dale Assembly Historic District	Lily Dale Assembly Historic District	January 28, 2022 (#100007380)	South St., Cottage Row, Lake Front Dr., East, 4th, 3rd, 2nd, 1st, North, Library, Buffalo, Marion, and Erie Sts., Cleveland Ave., Ridgeway Cir., The Boulevard; 42°21′06″N 79°19′35″W	Pomfret	
33	Dr. John Lord House	Dr. John Lord House	March 2, 1991 (#91000104)	Forest Rd. Extension; 42°02′34″N 79°16′50″W	Busti	
34	Gerald Mack House	Gerald Mack House	September 26, 1983 (#83001652)	79 N. Portage St. 42°19′31″N 79°34′52″W	Westfield	
35	McMahan Homestead	McMahan Homestead	September 26, 1983 (#83001653)	232 W. Main Rd. 42°18′46″N 79°35′30″W	Westfield	
36	Middlesex Gardens Apartment Complex		May 4, 2026 (#100012956)	343 Central Avenue; 42°27′23″N 79°20′00″W	Fredonia	
37	Midway Park	Midway Park	March 9, 2009 (#09000133)	NY 430; 42°12′06″N 79°25′20″W	Maple Springs	
38	Lewis Miller Cottage, Chautauqua Institution	Lewis Miller Cottage, Chautauqua Institution	October 15, 1966 (#66000506)	NY 17J; 42°12′30″N 79°27′56″W	Chautauqua	
39	Nixon Homestead	Nixon Homestead	September 26, 1983 (#83001654)	119 W. Main St. 42°19′03″N 79°35′05″W	Westfield	
40	Partridge-Sheldon House	Partridge-Sheldon House	June 2, 2000 (#00000572)	70 Prospect St. 42°05′21″N 79°14′15″W	Jamestown	
41	Pennsylvania Railroad Station	Pennsylvania Railroad Station	August 6, 1993 (#93000680)	Water St. 42°14′43″N 79°29′43″W	Mayville	
42	Levi J. and Frances A. Pierce House	Levi J. and Frances A. Pierce House	May 9, 2022 (#100007688)	21 Pearl St. 42°28′13″N 79°10′25″W	Forestville	
43	Point Chautauqua Historic District	Point Chautauqua Historic District	May 17, 1996 (#96000521)	Roughly bounded by NY 430 and Chautauqua Lake between Lake and Leet Aves. 42°14′15″N 79°27′37″W	Mayville	
44	Point Gratiot Lighthouse Complex	Point Gratiot Lighthouse Complex	December 18, 1979 (#79001568)	Sycamore Rd. 42°29′37″N 79°21′15″W	Dunkirk	
45	Rorig Bridge	Rorig Bridge	September 26, 1983 (#83001655)	Water St. at Chautauqua Creek; 42°18′56″N 79°34′43″W	Westfield	
46	School No. 7	School No. 7	March 5, 1992 (#92000068)	Jct. of E. Lake Shore Dr. and N. Serval St. 42°29′46″N 79°19′00″W	Dunkirk	
47	South Buffalo North Side Light	South Buffalo North Side Light	August 4, 1983 (#83001673)	Dunkirk Lighthouse and Veterans Park; 42°29′35″N 79°21′12″W	Dunkirk	Former light installed in 1903, removed in 1985, and now located at the Dunkirk Lighthouse and Veterans Park Museum
48	Henry Dwight Thompson House	Henry Dwight Thompson House	September 26, 1983 (#83001656)	29 Wood St. 42°19′00″N 79°34′10″W	Westfield	
49	US Post Office-Dunkirk	US Post Office-Dunkirk	November 17, 1988 (#88002488)	410 Central Ave. 42°28′54″N 79°20′01″W	Dunkirk	
50	US Post Office-Fredonia	US Post Office-Fredonia	November 17, 1988 (#88002515)	21 Day St. 42°26′28″N 79°19′57″W	Fredonia	
51	Ward House	Ward House	September 26, 1983 (#83001657)	118 W. Main St. 42°19′03″N 79°35′03″W	Westfield	
52	Welch Factory Building No. 1	Welch Factory Building No. 1	September 26, 1983 (#83001658)	101 N. Portage St. 42°19′35″N 79°34′55″W	Westfield	
53	The Wellman Building	The Wellman Building	August 21, 2009 (#09000629)	101-103 W. 3rd St. and 215-217 Cherry St. 42°05′46″N 79°14′33″W	Jamestown	
54	Reuben Gridley Wright Farm Complex	Reuben Gridley Wright Farm Complex	September 26, 1983 (#83001659)	233 E. Main St. 42°19′48″N 79°33′59″W	Westfield	
55	Reuben Wright House	Reuben Wright House	September 26, 1983 (#83001660)	309 E. Main St. 42°19′58″N 79°33′37″W	Westfield	
56	York-Skinner House	York-Skinner House	September 26, 1983 (#83001661)	31 Union St. 42°19′21″N 79°34′28″W	Westfield	

== See also ==
- List of National Historic Landmarks in New York
- National Register of Historic Places listings in New York
