= Lake Shore & Michigan Southern Railroad Station =

Lake Shore & Michigan Southern Railroad Station may refer to:

- Lake Shore & Michigan Southern Railroad Station (Westfield, New York), listed on the National Register of Historic Places in Chautauqua County, New York
- Lake Shore & Michigan Southern Railroad Station (Jefferson, Ohio), listed on the National Register of Historic Places in Ashtabula County, Ohio
- Lake Shore & Michigan Southern Railroad Station (Sandusky, Ohio), listed on the National Register of Historic Places in Erie County, Ohio, and still active as an Amtrak station.
