= Bliss House =

Bliss House may refer to:

in Lebanon

- Bliss House, a restaurant on Bliss Street, or Rue Bliss, in the Hamra area, within the Ras Beirut District of Beirut

in the United States

- Bliss House (Denver, Colorado), also known as "Building at 1389 Stuart Street", listed on the National Register of Historic Places (NRHP) in West Denver
- F. T. Bliss House, Emmett, Idaho, NRHP-listed in Gem County
- Bagley-Bliss House, now the Bliss Farm Inn, in Durham, Maine, NRHP-listed
- Abiah Bliss House, Rehoboth, Massachusetts, NRHP-listed
- Daniel Bliss Homestead, Rehoboth, Massachusetts, NRHP-listed
- L. Bliss House, Westfield, Chautauqua County, New York, NRHP-listed
- Phillip Paul Bliss House, Rome, Bradford County, Pennsylvania, now the Philip P. Bliss Gospel Songwriters Museum
- John Bliss House, Newport, Rhode Island, NRHP-listed
- Dumbarton Oaks, research institute and former residence of Richard and Mildred Bliss in Georgetown neighborhood of Washington, D.C.

== See also ==
- Bliss Building, Worcester, Massachusetts, NRHP-listed
