= Rorig Bridge =

- U.S. National Register of Historic Places
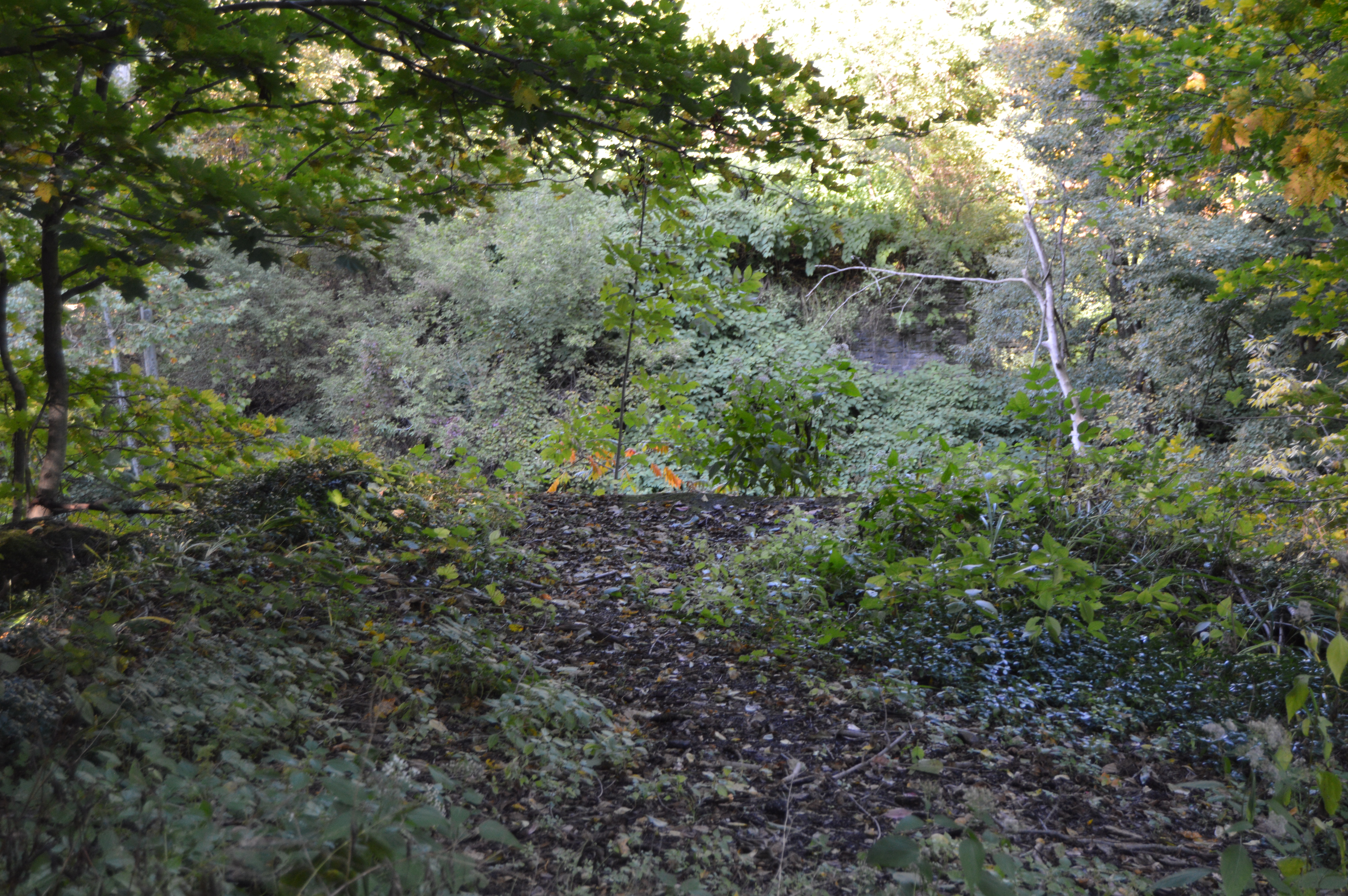
- Site of the bridge's southern portal

- Location within New York Location within the United States
- Location: Water Street at Chautauqua Creek, Westfield, New York
- Coordinates: 42°18′58″N 79°34′44″W
- Built: 1890
- Architect: Groton Bridge Co.
- Architectural style: Pratt Through Truss
- MPS: Westfield Village MRA
- NRHP reference No.: 83001655
- Added to NRHP: September 26, 1983

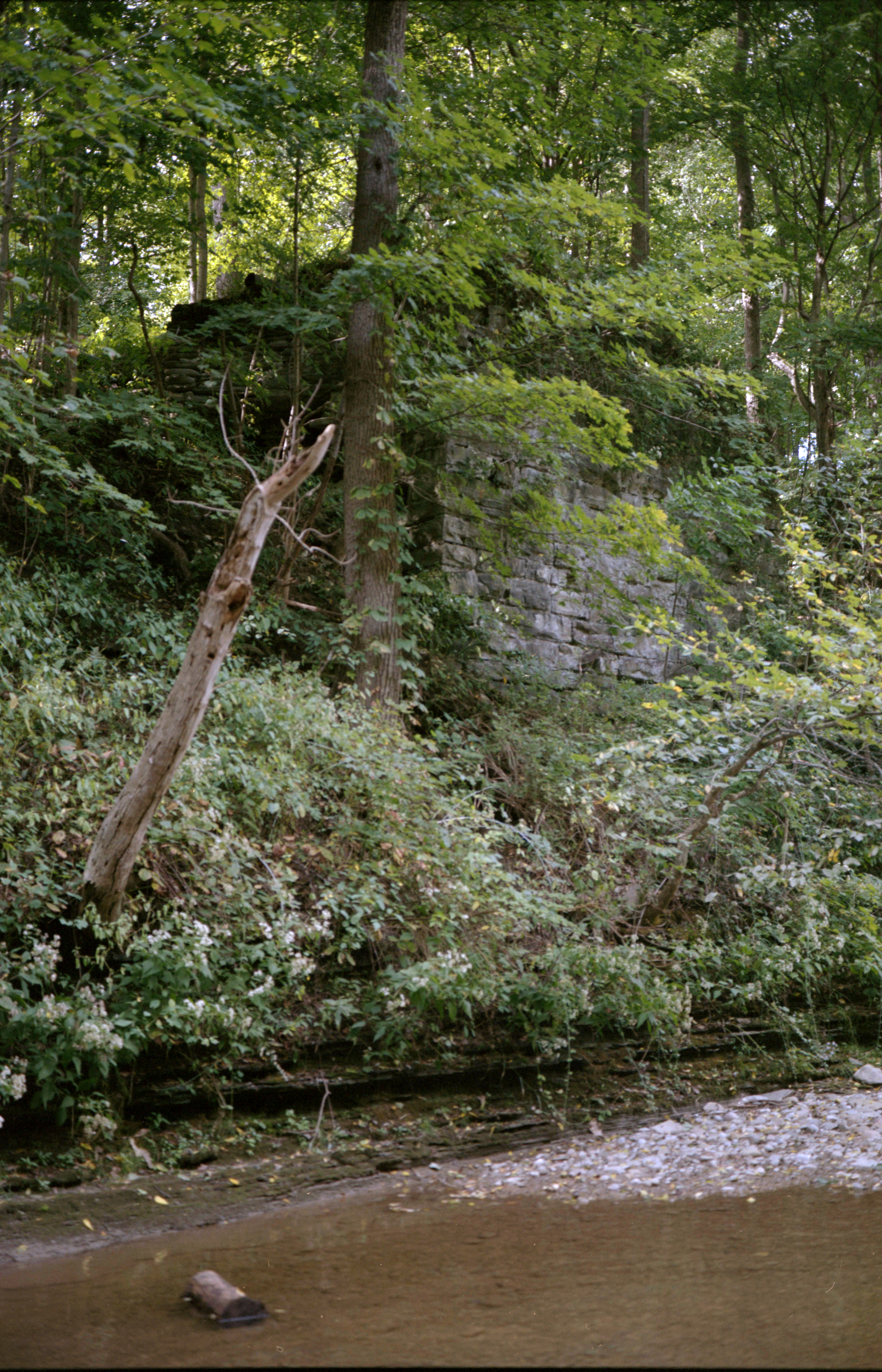
The stonework at the northern side of the creek where Rorig Bridge once stood

Rorig Bridge is a historic Pratt through truss bridge located at Westfield in Chautauqua County, New York. It was constructed in 1890 by the Groton Bridge and Manufacturing Company and spans Chautauqua Creek.

It was listed on the National Register of Historic Places in 1983.
