= Jamestown Historic District =

Jamestown Historic District may refer to:

- Jamestown Historic District (Jamestown, North Carolina), listed on the National Register of Historic Places in Guilford County, North Carolina
- Jamestown Historic District (Jamestown, North Dakota), listed on the National Register of Historic Places in Stutsman County, North Dakota
- Jamestown Historic District (Florence, South Carolina), listed on the National Register of Historic Places in Florence County, South Carolina
- Jamestown Downtown Historic District, Jamestown, New York
