= Westfield station =

Westfield station could refer to:

- Westfield station (Lake Shore and Michigan Southern Railway), a disused train station in Westfield, New York
- Westfield station (NJ Transit), a train station in Westfield, New Jersey
- Westfield station (Pittsburgh), a light rail station in Pittsburgh, Pennsylvania
- Westfield railway station, a disused railway station in Auckland, New Zealand
