= Henry Van Aernam =

American politician

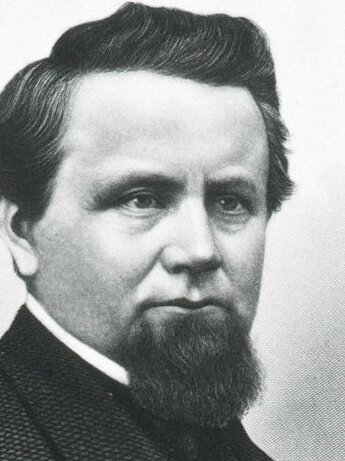

Member of the U.S. House of Representatives from New York
- In office March 4, 1865 – March 3, 1869
- Preceded by: Reuben E. Fenton
- Succeeded by: Porter Sheldon
- Constituency: 31st district
- In office March 4, 1879 – March 3, 1883
- Preceded by: George W. Patterson
- Succeeded by: Francis B. Brewer
- Constituency: 33rd district

Member of the New York State Assembly from the Cattaraugus County, 1st district
- In office January 1, 1858 – December 31, 1858
- Preceded by: Alanson King
- Succeeded by: Marsena Baker

Personal details
- Born: March 11, 1819 Marcellus, Onondaga County, New York, U.S.
- Died: June 1, 1894 (aged 75) Franklinville, New York, U.S.
- Resting place: Mount Prospect Cemetery; Franklinville, New York
- Party: Republican
- Spouse: Amy Melissa Etheridge Van Aernam
- Children: Isadora G. Van Aernam McVey; Charles Duane Van Aernam
- Education: Geneva Medical College; Willoughby Medical College
- Profession: Physician; Politician
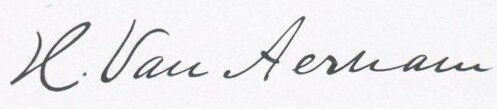
- Signature

Military service
- Allegiance: United States of America
- Branch/service: Union Army
- Years of service: September 26, 1862 - November 5, 1864
- Rank: Surgeon
- Unit: One Hundred and Fifty-fourth Regiment; New York Volunteer Infantry
- Battles/wars: United States Civil War

Henry Van Aernam (March 11, 1819 – June 1, 1894) was a United States representative from New York.

== Early life ==
Born in Marcellus, Onondaga County, Van Aerman pursued an academic course, studied medicine at the Geneva and Willoughby Medical Colleges and practiced his profession.

== Career ==
Van Aernam was a member of the New York State Assembly (Cattaraugus Co., 1st D.) in 1858. In the spring of 1858, at the close of the legislature, he returned to his practice.

During the United States Civil War Van Aernam enrolled in the Union Army as a surgeon in the One Hundred and Fifty-fourth Regiment, New York Volunteer Infantry, and served from September 26, 1862 to November 5, 1864.

A slavery-hating abolitionist, Van Aernam was a charter member of the Republican party. He was elected as a Republican to the Thirty-ninth and Fortieth Congresses, holding office from March 4, 1865 to March 3, 1869. He was appointed as Commissioner of Pensions on May 1, 1869, and held that office until May 31, 1871, when he resigned.

Elected to the Forty-sixth and Forty-seventh Congresses, Van Aernam again held office from March 4, 1879 to March 3, 1883. He resumed the practice of medicine in Franklinville, New York.

== Death ==
Van Aernam died in Franklinville, New York on June 1, 1894 (age 75 years, 2 months, and 21 days). He is interred at Mount Prospect Cemetery, Franklinville, New York.

== Family life ==
On November 30, 1845, Van Aernam married Amy Melissa Etheridge, and they had two children: a daughter, Isadora, and a son, Charles Duane.

Van Aernam's sister, Ann Van Aernam, married Benjamin Fuller, an early settler of Little Valley, New York. Ann and Benjamin's son would be named after Henry Van Aernam; Henry Van Aernam Fuller (1841–63) would die in the Battle of Gettysburg.

New York State Assembly
Preceded by Alanson King	New York State Assembly; Cattaraugus County, 1st District; 1858	Succeeded by Marsena Baker
U.S. House of Representatives
Preceded by Reuben E. Fenton	Member of the U.S. House of Representatives from New York's 31st congressional district 1865–1869	Succeeded by Porter Sheldon
Preceded by George W. Patterson	Member of the U.S. House of Representatives from New York's 33rd congressional district 1879–1883	Succeeded by Francis B. Brewer
