= Gerald Mack House =

Historic house in New York, United States

- U.S. National Register of Historic Places
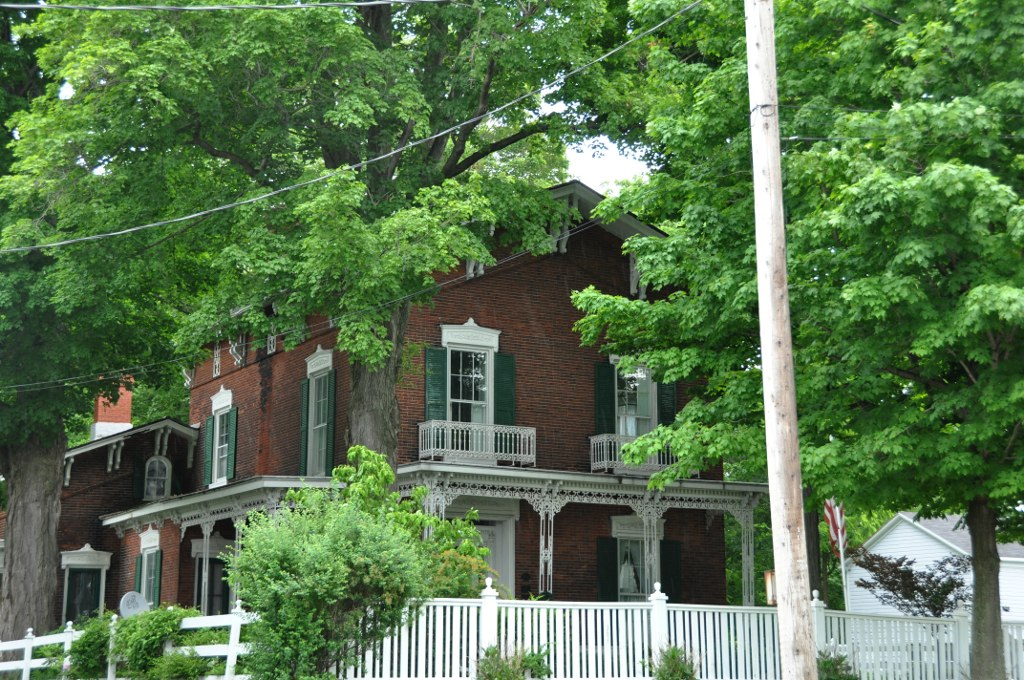
- Gerald Mack House, June 2012

- Location within New York Location within the United States
- Location: 79 N. Portage St., Westfield, New York
- Coordinates: 42°19′31″N 79°34′52″W
- Built: 1850
- Architectural style: Greek Revival
- MPS: Westfield Village MRA
- NRHP reference No.: 83001652
- Added to NRHP: September 26, 1983

Gerald Mack House is a historic home in the town of Westfield in Chautauqua County, New York. It is a two-story, brick Greek Revival style dwelling with Italianate features, built around 1850. It features cast iron embellishments on the entrance, lintels, sills, porches and balconies.

It was listed on the National Register of Historic Places in 1983.
