= Ward House (Westfield, New York) =

Historic house in New York, United States

- U.S. National Register of Historic Places
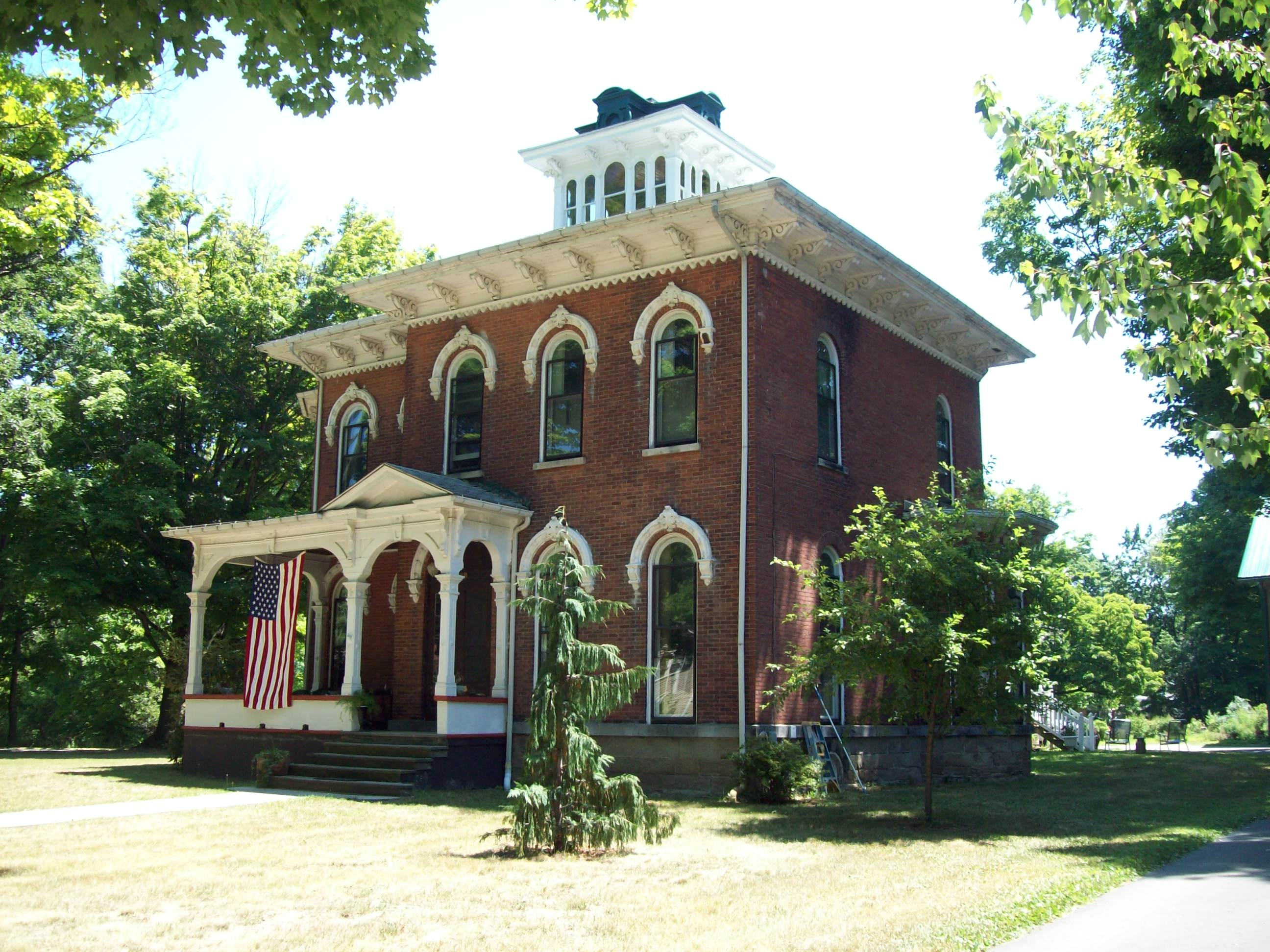
- Ward House, July 2012

- Location within New York Location within the United States
- Location: 118 W. Main St., Westfield, New York
- Coordinates: 42°19′3″N 79°35′3″W
- Built: 1860
- Architectural style: Italian Villa
- MPS: Westfield Village MRA
- NRHP reference No.: 83001657
- Added to NRHP: September 26, 1983

Ward House, also known as the William Allen House, is a historic home located at Westfield in Chautauqua County, New York. It is a 2-story, L-shaped brick Italian Villa–style residence built in the late 1860s. The home features a prominent cupola, and the property has a 1 1/2-story frame barn.

It was listed on the National Register of Historic Places in 1983.
