= Reuben Wright House =

Historic house in New York, United States

- U.S. National Register of Historic Places
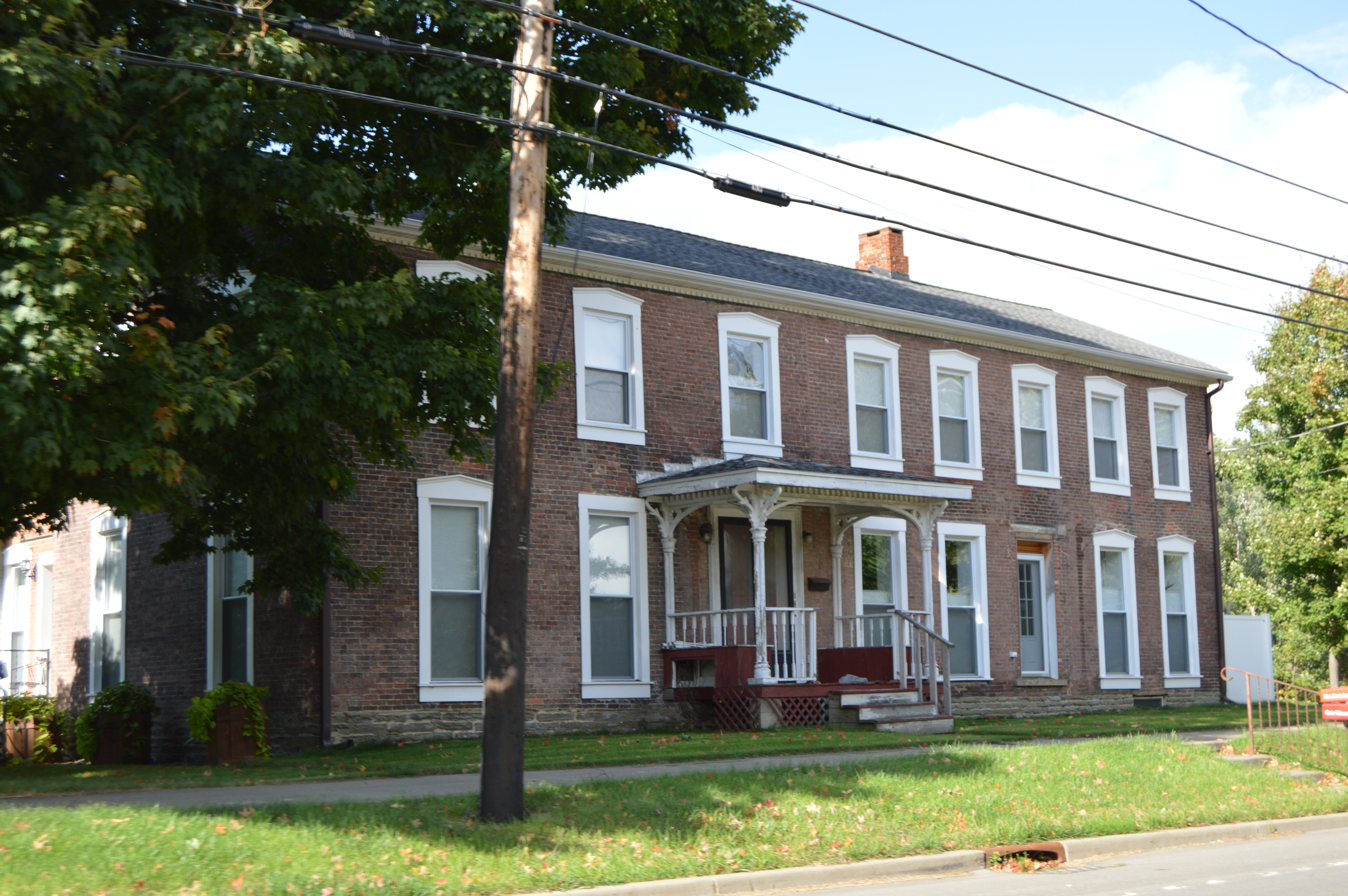
- Front and western side

- Location within New York Location within the United States
- Location: 309 E. Main St., Westfield, New York
- Coordinates: 42°19′53″N 79°33′38″W
- Built: 1830
- Architectural style: Federal
- MPS: Westfield Village MRA
- NRHP reference No.: 83001660
- Added to NRHP: September 26, 1983

Reuben Wright House is a historic home located at Westfield in Chautauqua County, New York. It is a two-story, eight-bay structure built primarily of brick. The earliest portion of the dwelling was built in the early 1830s and it is one of the earliest extant structures in the area. For some time in the mid-19th century, the dwelling operated as a tavern and was known as the Drovers Inn.

It was listed on the National Register of Historic Places in 1983.
