= York-Skinner House =

Historic house in New York, United States

- U.S. National Register of Historic Places
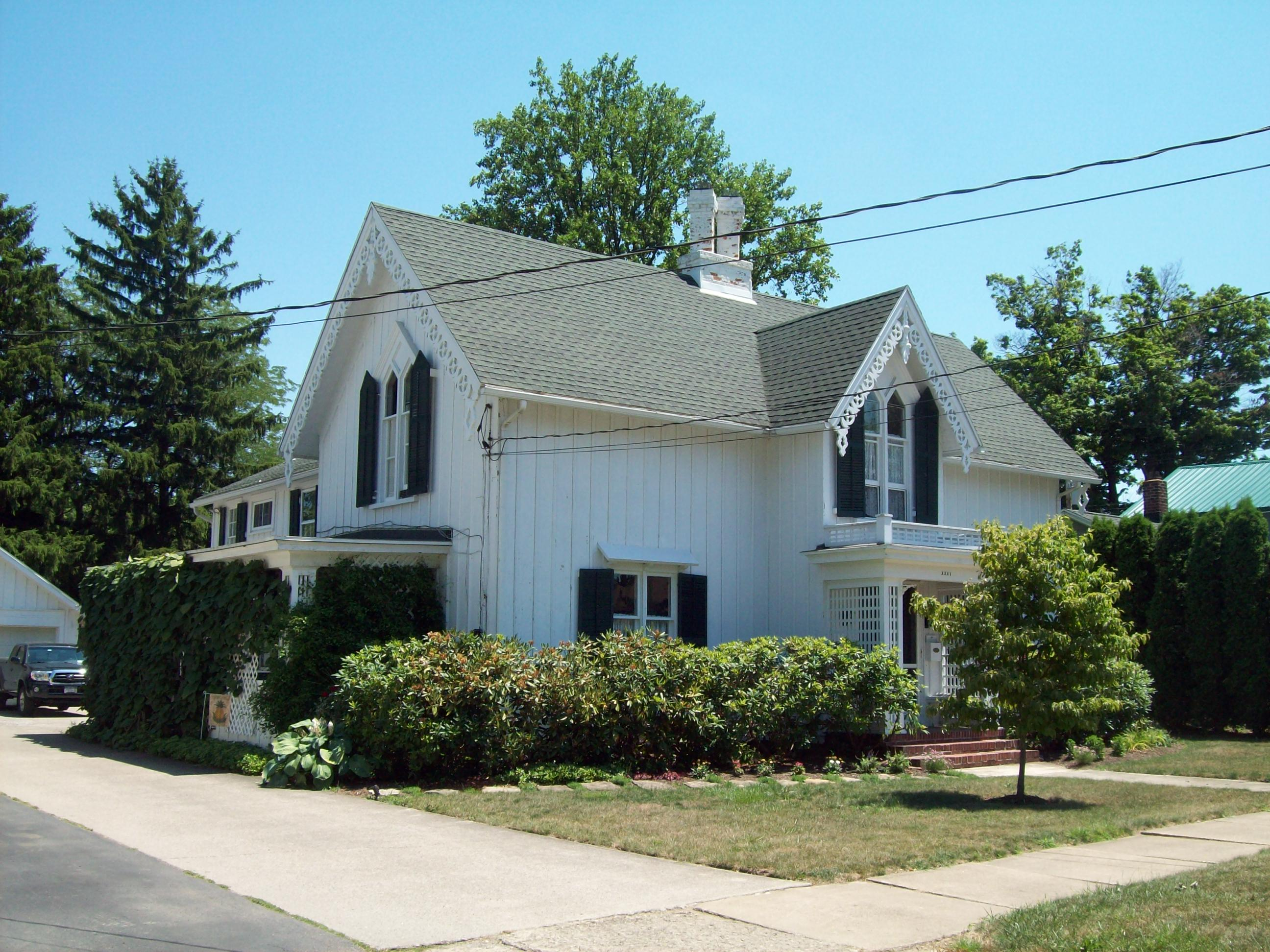
- York-Skinner House, July 2012

- Location within New York Location within the United States
- Location: 31 Union St., Westfield, New York
- Coordinates: 42°19′21″N 79°34′28″W
- Built: 1866
- Architectural style: Carpenter Gothic
- MPS: Westfield Village MRA
- NRHP reference No.: 83001661
- Added to NRHP: September 26, 1983

The York-Skinner House is a historic house located at Westfield in Chautauqua County, New York, United States. It is a 1 1/2-story wood-frame Gothic Revival-style dwelling built in 1866. The current structure incorporated an earlier dwelling built before 1833.

It was listed on the National Register of Historic Places in 1983.
