= Porter Sheldon =

American politician (1831–1908)

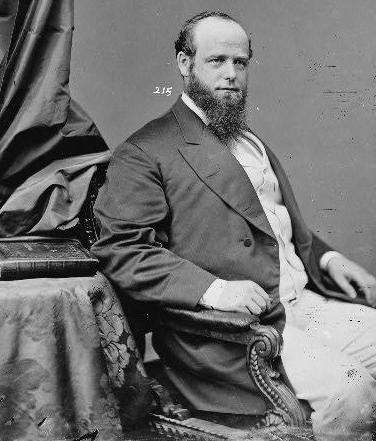

Member of the U.S. House of Representatives from New York's 31st district
- In office March 4, 1869 – March 3, 1871
- Preceded by: Henry Van Aernam
- Succeeded by: Walter L. Sessions

Personal details
- Born: September 29, 1831 Victor, New York, U.S.
- Died: August 15, 1908 (aged 76) Jamestown, New York, U.S.
- Resting place: Lake View Cemetery; Jamestown, New York, U.S.
- Party: Republican
- Spouse: Mary Crowley Sheldon
- Children: Ralph Crowley Sheldon
- Profession: Lawyer; Politician

Porter Sheldon (September 29, 1831 – August 15, 1908) was an American politician and a U.S. representative from New York.

== Early life ==
Born in Victor, New York, Sheldon completed preparatory studies, studied law, and was admitted to the bar in 1854 at Batavia, New York.

== Career ==
Sheldon commenced practice in Randolph, New York, then moved to Rockford, Illinois, in 1857 and continued the practice of law. He served as member of the Illinois constitutional convention in 1861, then returned to Jamestown, New York, in 1865 and continued the practice of law.

Elected as a Republican to the Forty-first Congress, Sheldon was a United States representative for the thirty-first district of New York from March 4, 1869 – March 3, 1871. An unsuccessful candidate for renomination in 1870, he resumed the practice of his profession. He was one of the founders of the American Aristotype Co. which later became part of the Eastman Kodak Company in Rochester.

== Death ==
Sheldon died in Jamestown, New York, on August 15, 1908 (76 years, 10 months, and 17 days). He is interred in Lake View Cemetery in Jamestown. His home, the Partridge-Sheldon House, was listed on the National Register of Historic Places in 2000.

== Family life ==
Sheldon married Mary Crowley and they had a son, Ralph Crowley Sheldon.

U.S. House of Representatives
Preceded by Henry Van Aernam	Member of the U.S. House of Representatives from New York's 31st congressional district 1869–1871	Succeeded by Walter L. Sessions
