= Lake Shore & Michigan Southern Freight Depot (Westfield, New York) =

- U.S. National Register of Historic Places
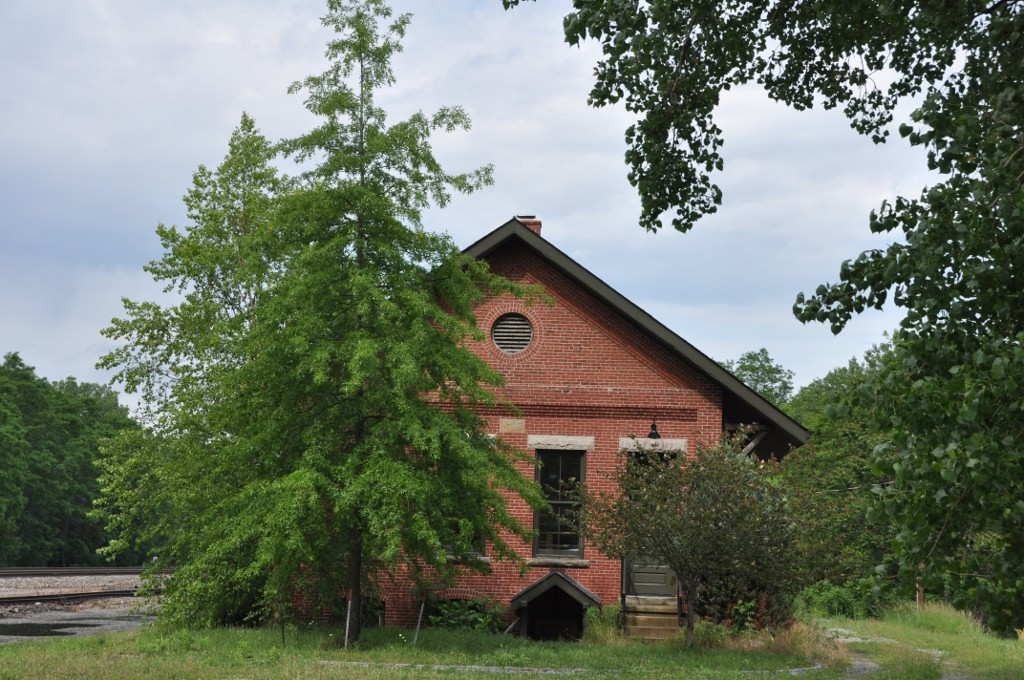
- Lake Shore & Michigan Southern Freight Depot, June 2012

- Location within New York Location within the United States
- Location: English Street, Westfield, New York
- Coordinates: 42°19′52″N 79°34′35″W
- Built: 1904
- Architect: Lake Shore and Michigan Southern
- MPS: Westfield Village MRA
- NRHP reference No.: 83001651
- Added to NRHP: September 26, 1983

Lake Shore & Michigan Southern Freight Depot is a historic freight depot located at Westfield in Chautauqua County, New York, constructed in 1904 for the Lake Shore and Michigan Southern Railway. It is a 1 1/2-story brick structure, and it is co-located with the Lake Shore & Michigan Southern Railroad Station.

It was listed on the National Register of Historic Places in 1983.
