= St. Luke's Episcopal Church (Jamestown, New York) =

Historic church in New York, United States

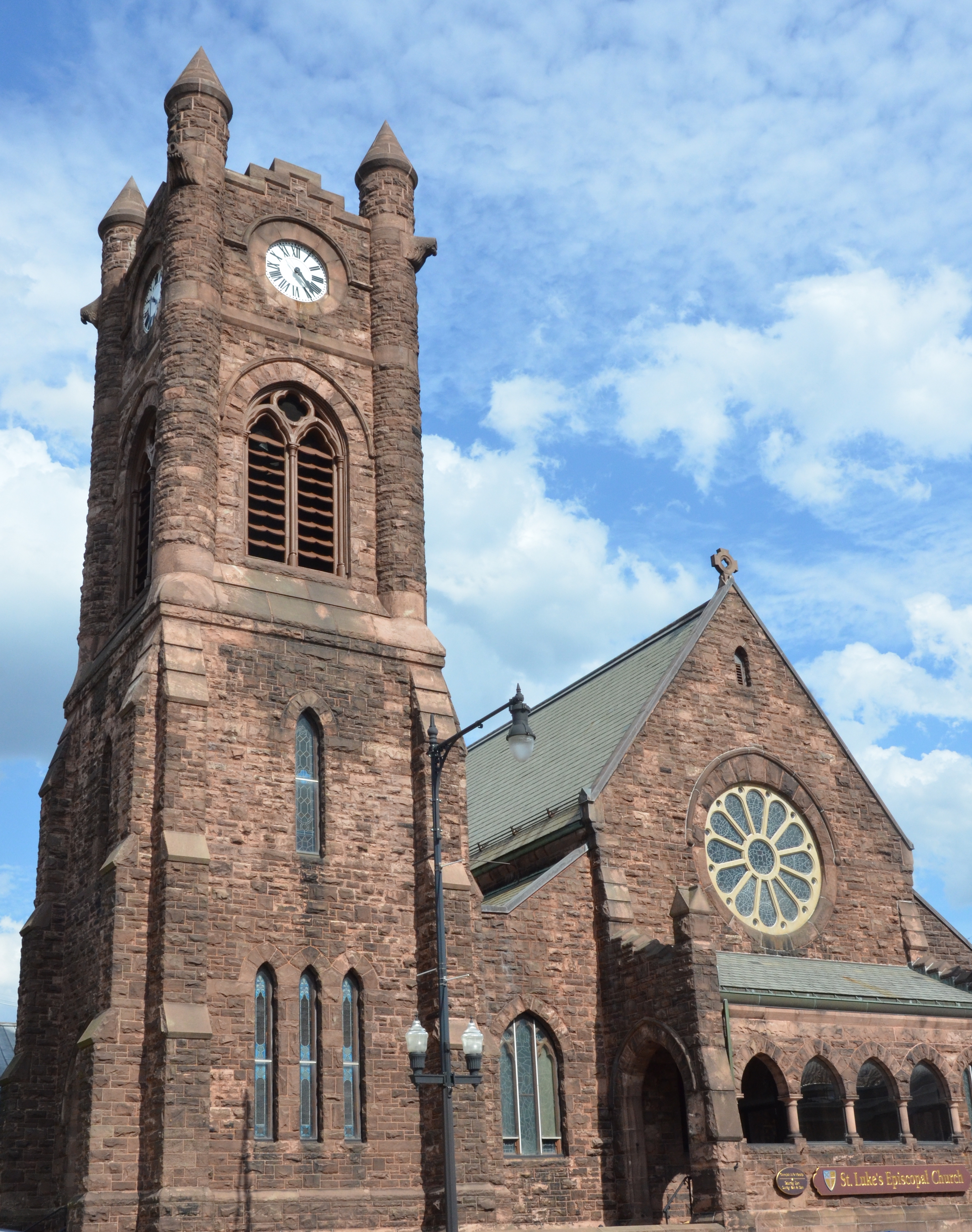

St. Luke's Episcopal Church is a parish church in the Episcopal Diocese of Western New York. located at 410 North Main Street in Downtown Jamestown, New York. It is included on the National Register of Historic Places

== Architecture ==
St. Luke's Church has had three structures. The first, built in 1854, was Richard Upjohn design. The Vestry paid $2,000 for the lot on the corner of Main and 4th in Jamestown, where the current church now stands. The first cornerstone of the church was laid on September 27, 1854, and it was consecrated on May 6, 1856. On the Sunday before Christmas 1862, a defective flue caused a fire in the structure, and the church burned down. The flames could not be brought under control because Jamestown did not have a village water system at that time.

The parish immediately started on reconstruction, using the foundation and the architectural plans of the previous church. The cornerstone for the second structure was laid on June 18, 1863. In January 1890, the parish received a large bequest from Mary Prendergast (daughter-in-law of Jamestown founder James Prendergast). Under the terms of her will, St. Luke's received $125,000 to build a fireproof stone church in memory of her daughter, Catherine. The cornerstone of the new church was laid on November 29, 1892. The James Prendergast Library is a sister building also built with a bequest from Mary Prendergast to memorialize her son, James, who also predeceased her.

The church is a structure of rock-faced Medina sandstone, which blends Late Gothic Revival and Romanesque Revival elements. It was designed by William P. Wentworth. The structure has a traditional cruciform plan with a square bell tower attached to the northeast corner of the church. The tower features a clock on each face side and rounded corners topped with conical pinnacle. Intact interior, original J & R Lamb Studio stained glass windows, an arcaded façade with a porch and narthex, and a stone tracery in the west facing Rose Window are also within the church. As a contributing property to the Jametown Downtown Historic District, St. Luke's has used its historic designation to help preserve Jamestown's downtown urban core with State funding for historical preservation projects. St. Luke's Episcopal Church has been awarded two $500,000 preservation awards from the NYS Parks and Historical Preserveration Office to preserve its unstable belltower (in 2018) and for to restore its pealing porches (in 2024).

St. Luke's was inducted into the Medina Sandstone Hall of Fame in October of 2024.

In 2017, new stained glass commissioned from Beyer Studio were installed as part of a renovation of the Undercroft. The windows feature the four seasons of flora and fauna in Chautauqua County.

== Rectors ==
- Levi W. Norton (1852–1870)
- James A. Robinson (1870–1874)
- William H. Morrison (1875-1876)
- E. Spruille Burford (1877–1880)
- Theodore M. Bishop (1881–1885)
- Sidney Dealy (1885–1901)
- John T. Kerrin (1901–1909)
- Larid Wingate Snell (1909–1917)
- Reginald Norton Wilcox (1917–1929)
- Lewis E. Ward (1929–1951)
- George O’ Pray (1951–1976)
- Richard Fenn (1977–1999)
- Eric Williams (2000–2012)
- Luke Fodor (2014–present)

== Notable parishioners ==
Supreme Court Justice Robert H. Jackson was confirmed at St. Luke's and played the organ as a boy. When Jackson died in October 1954, all eight Supreme Court Justices traveled with the body of Robert H. Jackson and the Jackson family to Jamestown for his funeral at St. Luke's. It was the only and last time that all the Supreme Court Justices currently sitting at the Supreme Court were all in one location.
