= McMahan Homestead =

Historic house in New York, United States

- U.S. National Register of Historic Places
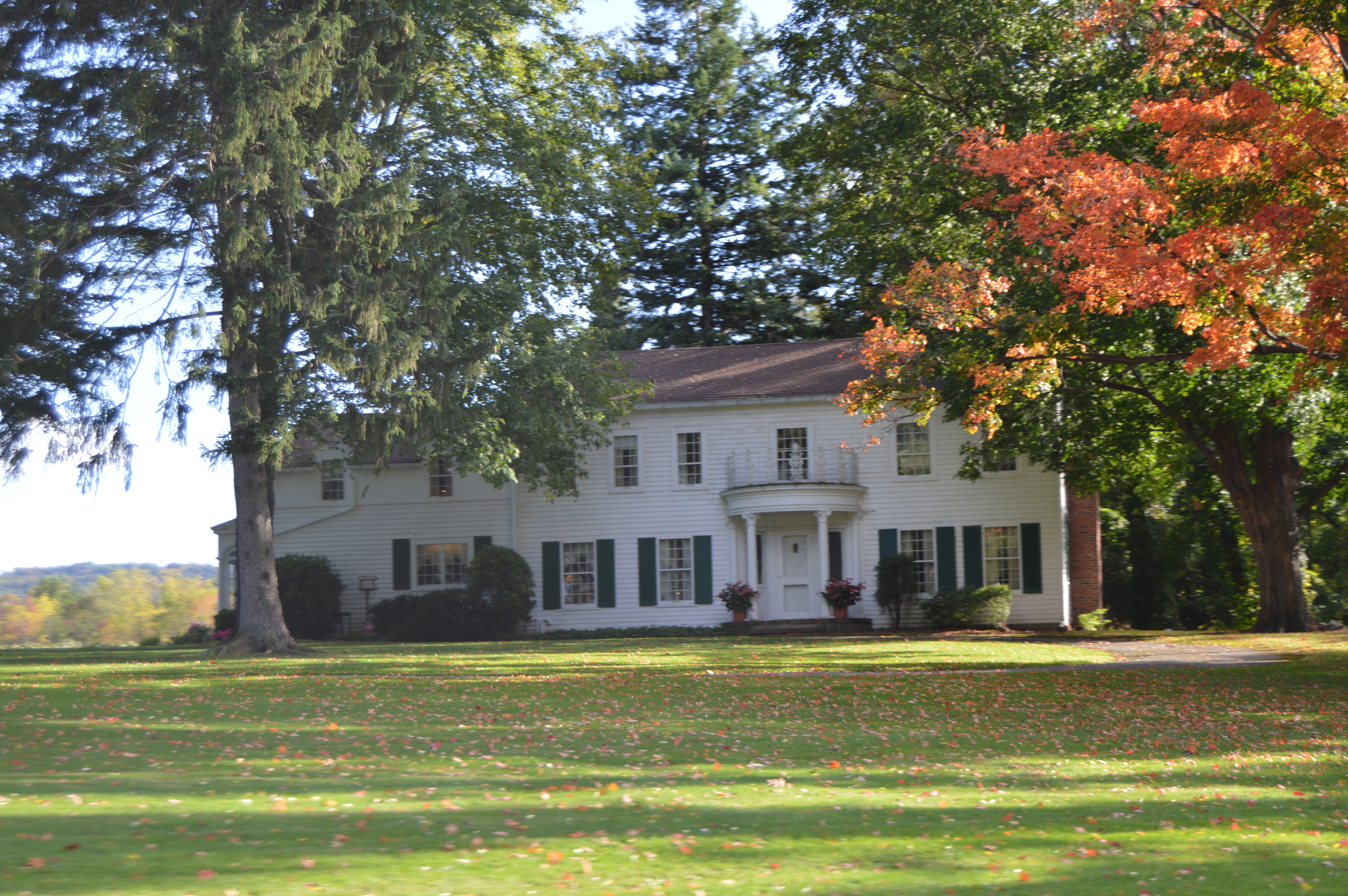
- Roadside view of the farmhouse

- Location within New York Location within the United States
- Location: 232 W. Main Rd., Westfield, New York
- Coordinates: 42°18′42″N 79°35′27″W
- Built: 1820
- Architect: McMahan, James
- Architectural style: Federal
- MPS: Westfield Village MRA
- NRHP reference No.: 83001653
- Added to NRHP: September 26, 1983

McMahan Homestead, also known as Landmark Acres, is a historic home located in Westfield in Chautauqua County, New York. It is a two-story, five bay wood frame dwelling built in about 1820. The home features a semicircular portico with a denticulated cornice and corinthian columns that was added in the 20th century. On this property is a barn dating from the early 1800s. The home was constructed by Chautauqua County's first settler, Col. James McMahan, who came to Westfield in 1802 from Northumberland County, Pennsylvania. The property is the oldest settled property in Chautauqua county with an original deed from the Holland Land Company for a large portion of Chautauqua County and has the oldest landmark in the county. Chautauqua County celebrated its 100th anniversary, 1902, on the front lawn of the McMahan homestead. In 2002 Chautauqua county celebrated its 200th anniversary also on the property.

It was listed on the National Register of Historic Places in 1983.
