= Harriet Campbell-Taylor House =

Historic house in New York, United States

- U.S. National Register of Historic Places
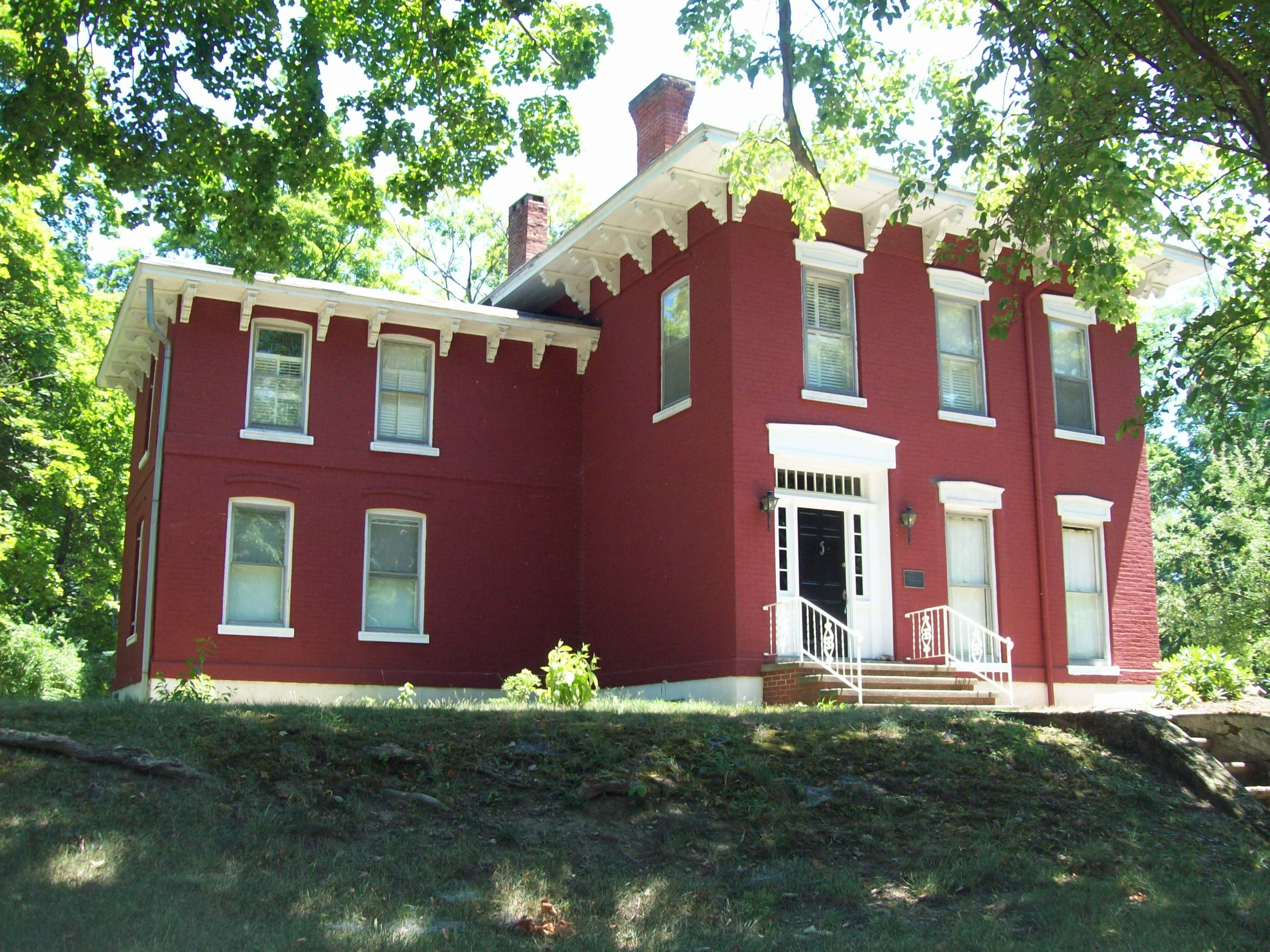
- Harriet Campbell-Taylor House, July 2012

- Location within New York Location within the United States
- Location: 145 S. Portage St., Westfield, New York
- Coordinates: 42°18′52″N 79°34′27″W
- Built: 1850
- Architectural style: Greek Revival, Italianate
- MPS: Westfield Village MRA
- NRHP reference No.: 83001648
- Added to NRHP: September 26, 1983

Harriet Campbell-Taylor House is a historic home located at Westfield in Chautauqua County, New York. It is a two-story brick Italianate and Greek Revival style dwelling built in 1850.

It was listed on the National Register of Historic Places in 1983.
