= East Main Street Historic District (Westfield, New York) =

Historic district in New York, United States

- Candlelight Lodge B & B, East Main Street Historic District
- U.S. National Register of Historic Places
- U.S. Historic district
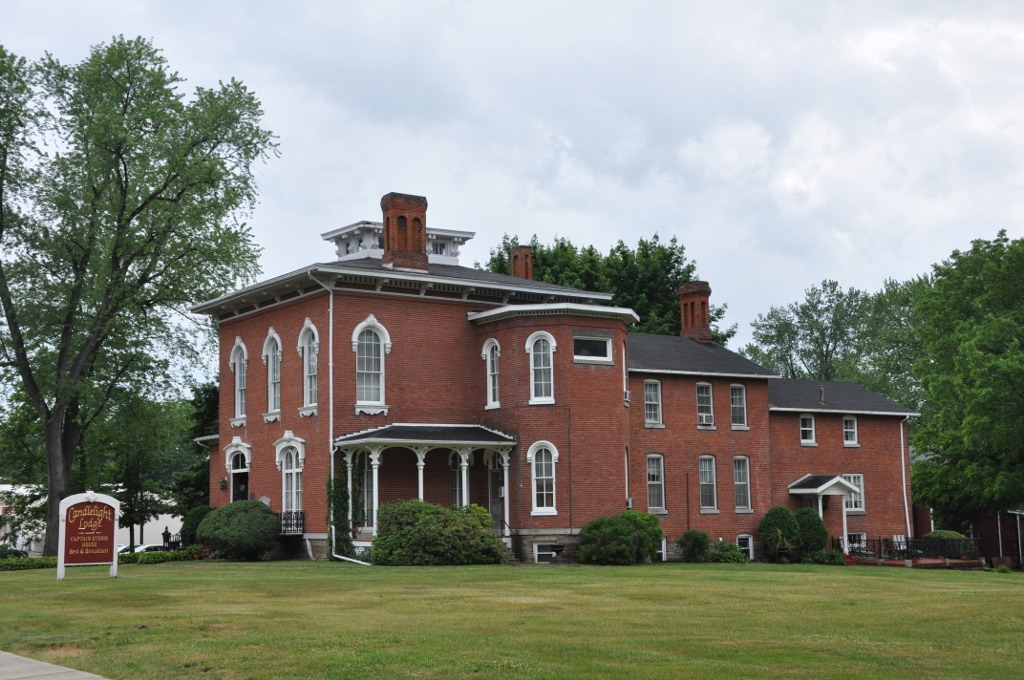
- Candlelight Lodge in the East Main Street Historic District, June 2012

- Location within New York Location within the United States
- Location: 143 E. Main St., Westfield, New York
- Coordinates: 42°19′33″N 79°34′9″W
- Architectural style: Italianate
- MPS: Westfield Village MRA
- NRHP reference No.: 83003893
- Added to NRHP: December 16, 1983

East Main Street Historic District is a national historic district located in Westfield in Chautauqua County, New York. It is an approximately 28-acre (110,000 m^{2}) district encompassing 20 buildings and the Westfield Cemetery located along East Main Street. A number of the structures are in the Italianate and Colonial Revival styles. Candlelight Lodge was built in 1851 by a prominent Philadelphia architect as a private home, the property encompassing a good portion of the east half of the Village of Westfield. Candlelight became a lodge in the 1920s and a bed and breakfast in 1986. Candlelight Lodge is a seven bedroom Victorian mansion currently on a two-acre lot in the Village of Westfield. Candlelight also has the Captain Storm House, a Queen Anne Victorian home moved on to this property in 2000 with the assistance of the National Historic Trust and listed on the National Resister of Historic Places.

It was listed on the National Register of Historic Places in 1983.

== Gallery ==
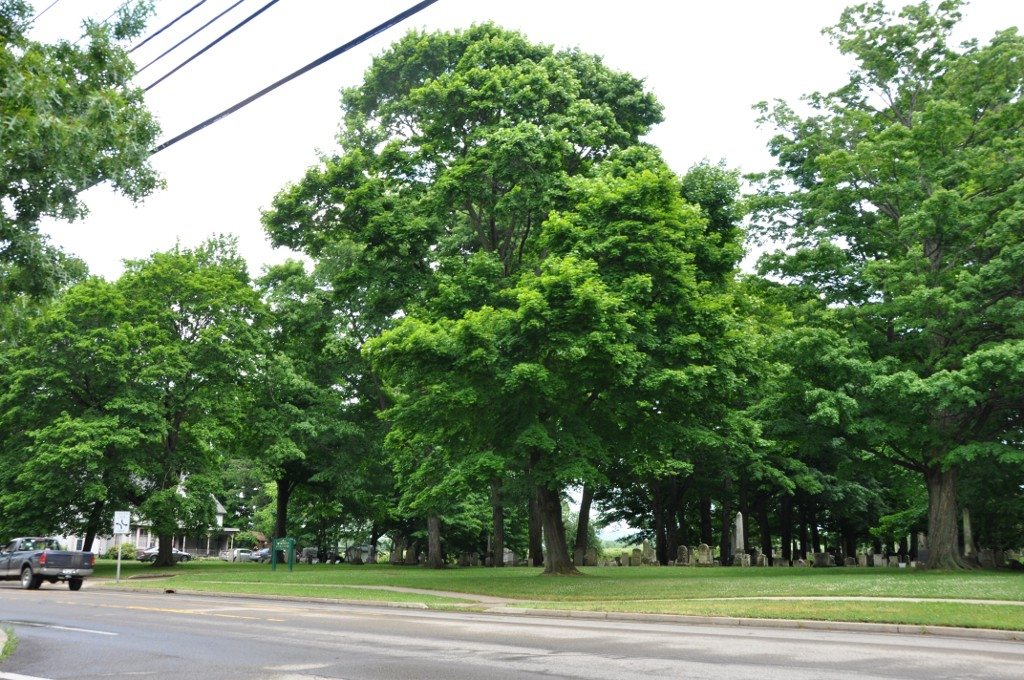
Westfield Cemetery
