= French Portage Road Historic District =

Historic district in New York, United States

- U.S. National Register of Historic Places
- U.S. Historic district
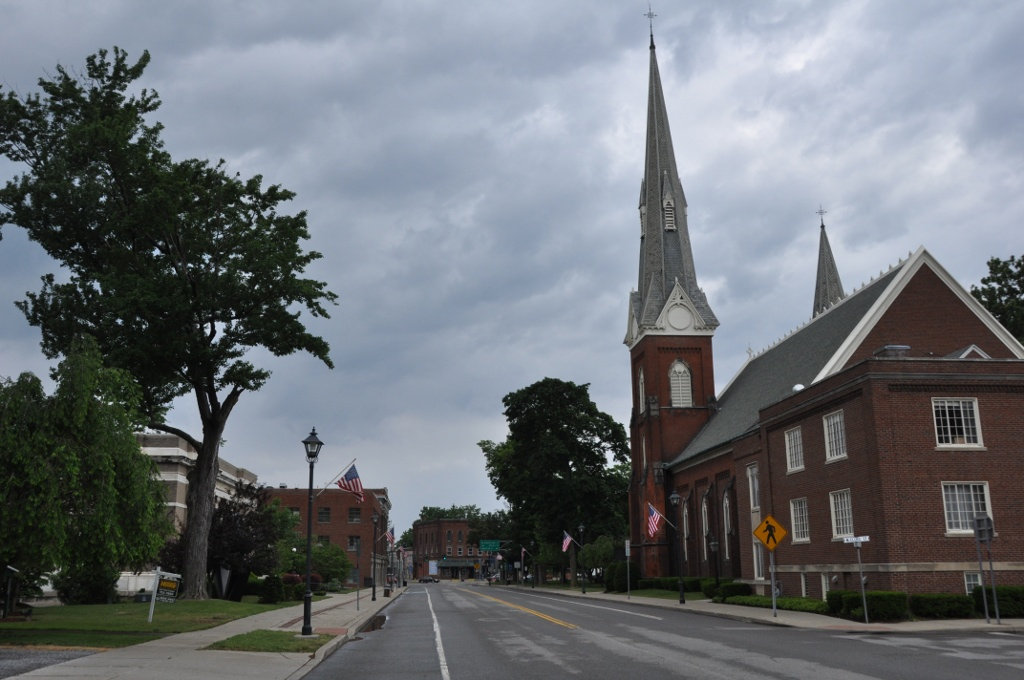
- French Portage Road Historic District, June 2012

- Location within New York Location within the United States
- Location: E. Main and Portage Sts., Westfield, New York
- Coordinates: 42°19′11″N 79°34′33″W
- Architectural style: Colonial Revival, Greek Revival, Gothic Revival
- MPS: Westfield Village MRA
- NRHP reference No.: 83003895
- Added to NRHP: December 16, 1983

French Portage Road Historic District is a national historic district located at Westfield in Chautauqua County, New York, United States. It encompasses the nearly intact 19th century and early 20th century village core clustered around the principal intersection of East Main Street and South Portage and the commons. There are 104 structures in the district that reflect a variety of architectural styles including Colonial Revival, Greek Revival, and Gothic Revival.

It was listed on the National Register of Historic Places in 1983.
