= Atwater-Stone House =

Historic house in New York, United States

- U.S. National Register of Historic Places
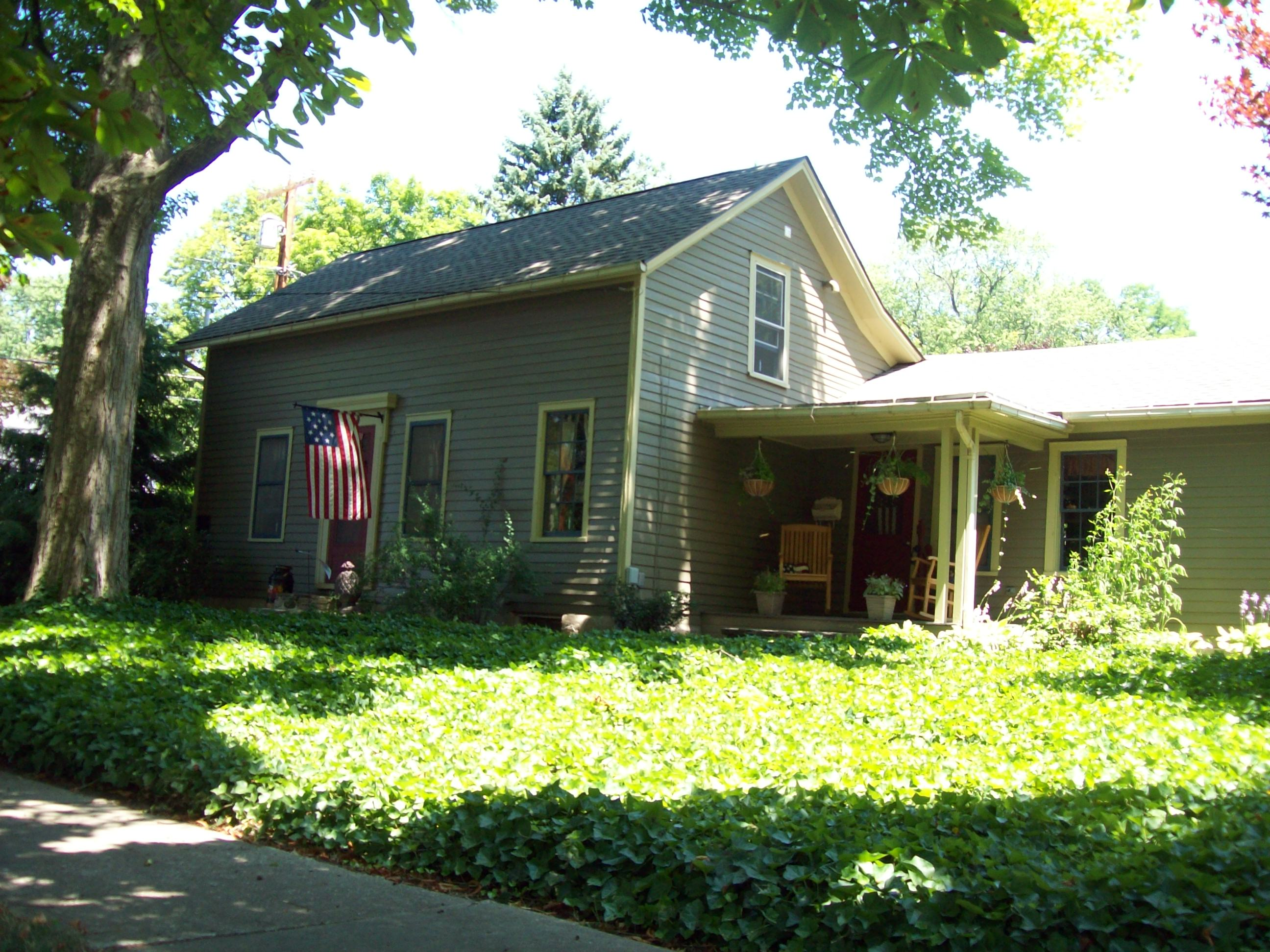
- Atwater-Stone House, July 2012

- Location within New York Location within the United States
- Location: 29 Water St., Westfield, New York
- Coordinates: 42°19′8″N 79°34′46″W
- Built: c. 1812
- MPS: Westfield Village MRA
- NRHP reference No.: 83003887
- Added to NRHP: December 16, 1983

The Atwater-Stone House is a historic house located at 29 Water Street in Westfield, Chautauqua County, New York.

== Description and history ==
It is a 1 1/2-story, wood-framed dwelling, originally built in about 1812 and expanded in 1850.

It was listed on the National Register of Historic Places on December 16, 1983.
