= Frank A. Hall House =

Historic house in New York, United States

- U.S. National Register of Historic Places
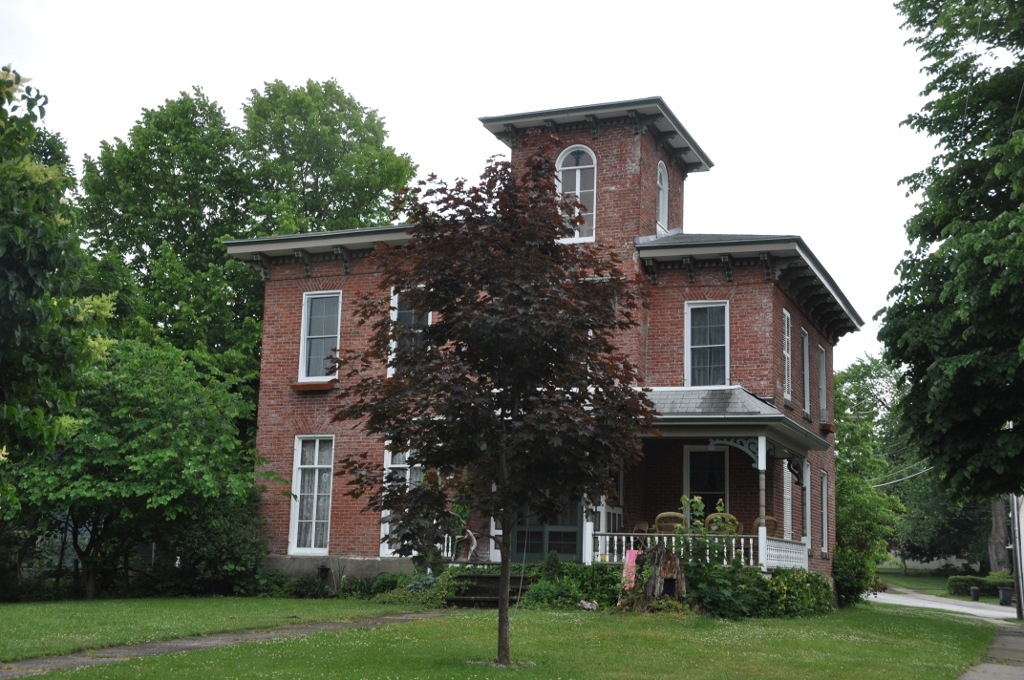
- Frank A. Hall House, June 2012

- Location within New York Location within the United States
- Location: 34 Washington St., Westfield, New York
- Coordinates: 42°19′31″N 79°34′41″W
- Built: 1855
- Architectural style: Italian Villa
- MPS: Westfield Village MRA
- NRHP reference No.: 83001650
- Added to NRHP: September 26, 1983

Frank A. Hall House is a historic home located at Westfield in Chautauqua County, New York. It is a two-story stuccoed brick Italian Villa style dwelling built about 1855. It is characterized by an asymmetrical massing of wings surrounding a three-story central tower.

It was listed on the National Register of Historic Places in 1983.
