= Henry Dwight Thompson House =

Historic house in New York, United States

- U.S. National Register of Historic Places
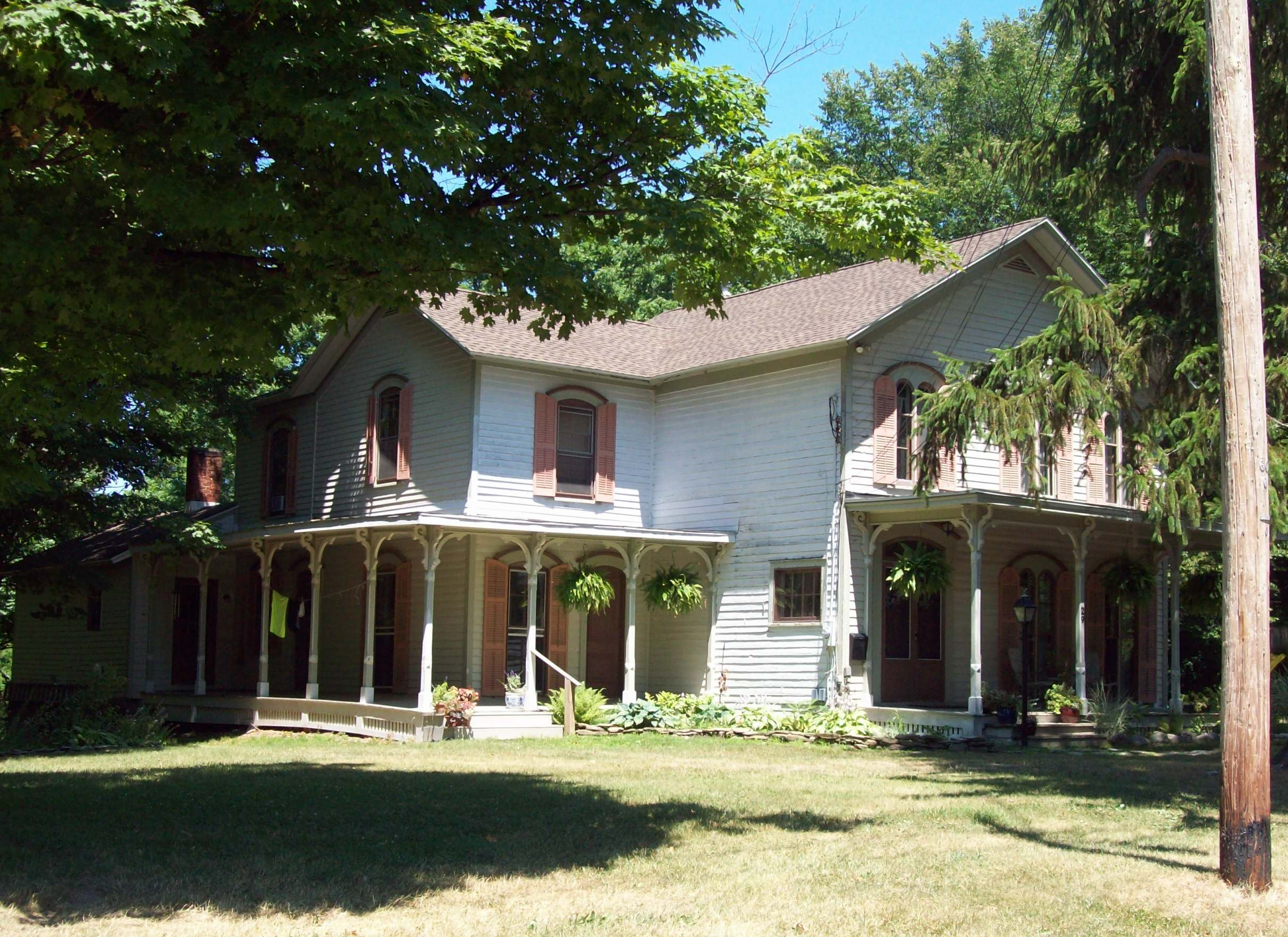
- Henry Dwight Thompson House, July 2012

- Location within New York Location within the United States
- Location: 29 Wood St., Westfield, New York
- Coordinates: 42°19′0″N 79°34′10″W
- Built: 1869
- Architect: Mr. Sylvester
- Architectural style: Carpenter Gothic
- MPS: Westfield Village MRA
- NRHP reference No.: 83001656
- Added to NRHP: September 26, 1983

Henry Dwight Thompson House is a historic home located at Westfield in Chautauqua County, New York.

It is a two-story, L-shaped wood frame Victorian Carpenter Gothic style residence built in 1869.

It was listed on the National Register of Historic Places in 1983.
