= Fay-Usborne Mill =

- U.S. National Register of Historic Places
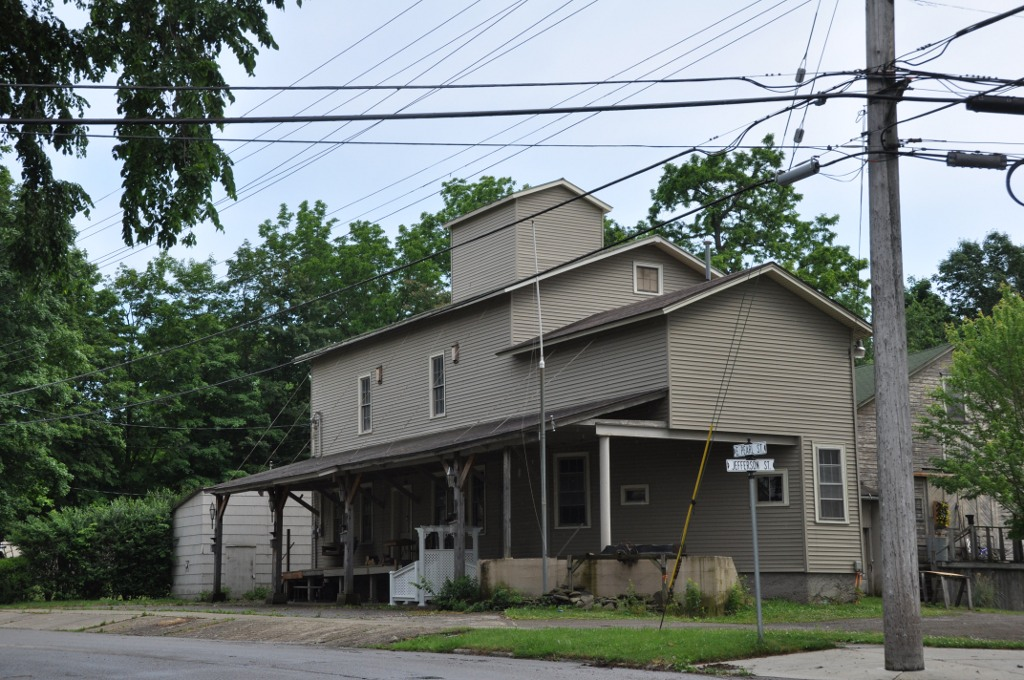
- Fay-Usborne Mill, June 2012

- Location within New York Location within the United States
- Location: 48 Pearl St., Westfield, New York
- Coordinates: 42°19′38″N 79°34′38″W
- Built: 1899
- Architect: Harris, James C.
- MPS: Westfield Village MRA
- NRHP reference No.: 83001649
- Added to NRHP: September 26, 1983

Fay-Usborne Mill is a historic grist mill and feed store located at Westfield in Chautauqua County, New York. The original two story, frame feed mill was built in 1899 by James C. Harris. It was purchased in 1913 by John R. Fay who, with his partner Thomas Usborne, expanded the business to include a variety of grain and cereal processing machines.

It was listed on the National Register of Historic Places in 1983.
