= Partridge-Sheldon House =

Historic house in New York, United States

- U.S. National Register of Historic Places
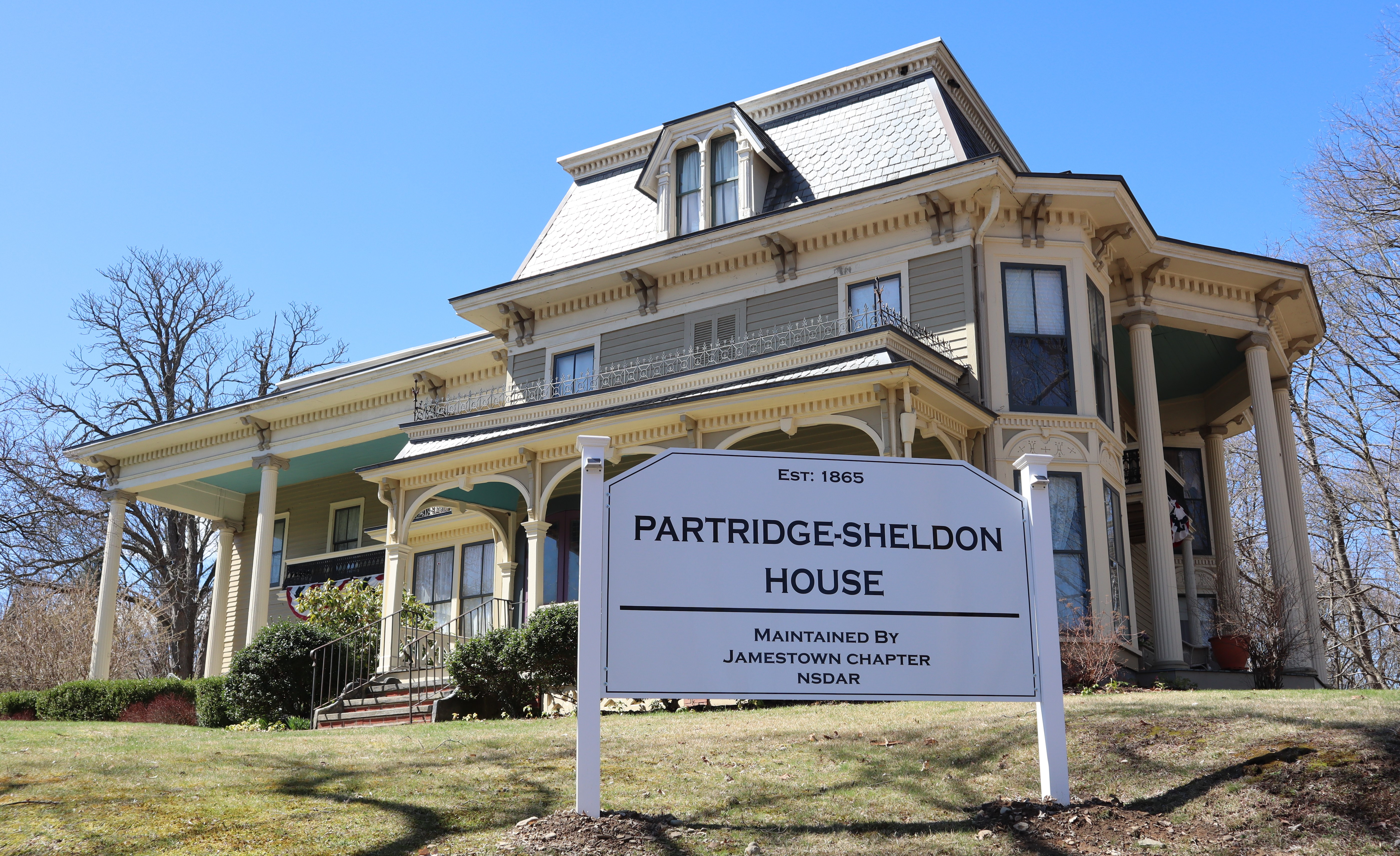
- Partridge-Sheldon House in 2024

- Location within New York Location within the United States
- Location: 70 Prospect St., Jamestown, New York
- Coordinates: 42°5′21″N 79°14′15″W
- Built: 1865
- Architectural style: Second Empire
- NRHP reference No.: 00000572
- Added to NRHP: June 02, 2000

Partridge-Sheldon House is a historic home located at Jamestown in Chautauqua County, New York. It is a three-story Second Empire style residence built between about 1850 and 1867, and substantially renovated and enlarged about 1880. The structure features a Mansard roof with patterned and polychromed slate, decorative eave brackets, and an imposing Mansard-roofed front porch with ornamental iron cresting. It was the home of Porter Sheldon (1831–1908).

The house is owned and maintained by the Jamestown Chapter of the Daughters of the American Revolution. It was listed on the National Register of Historic Places in 2000.
