= Chautauqua Creek =

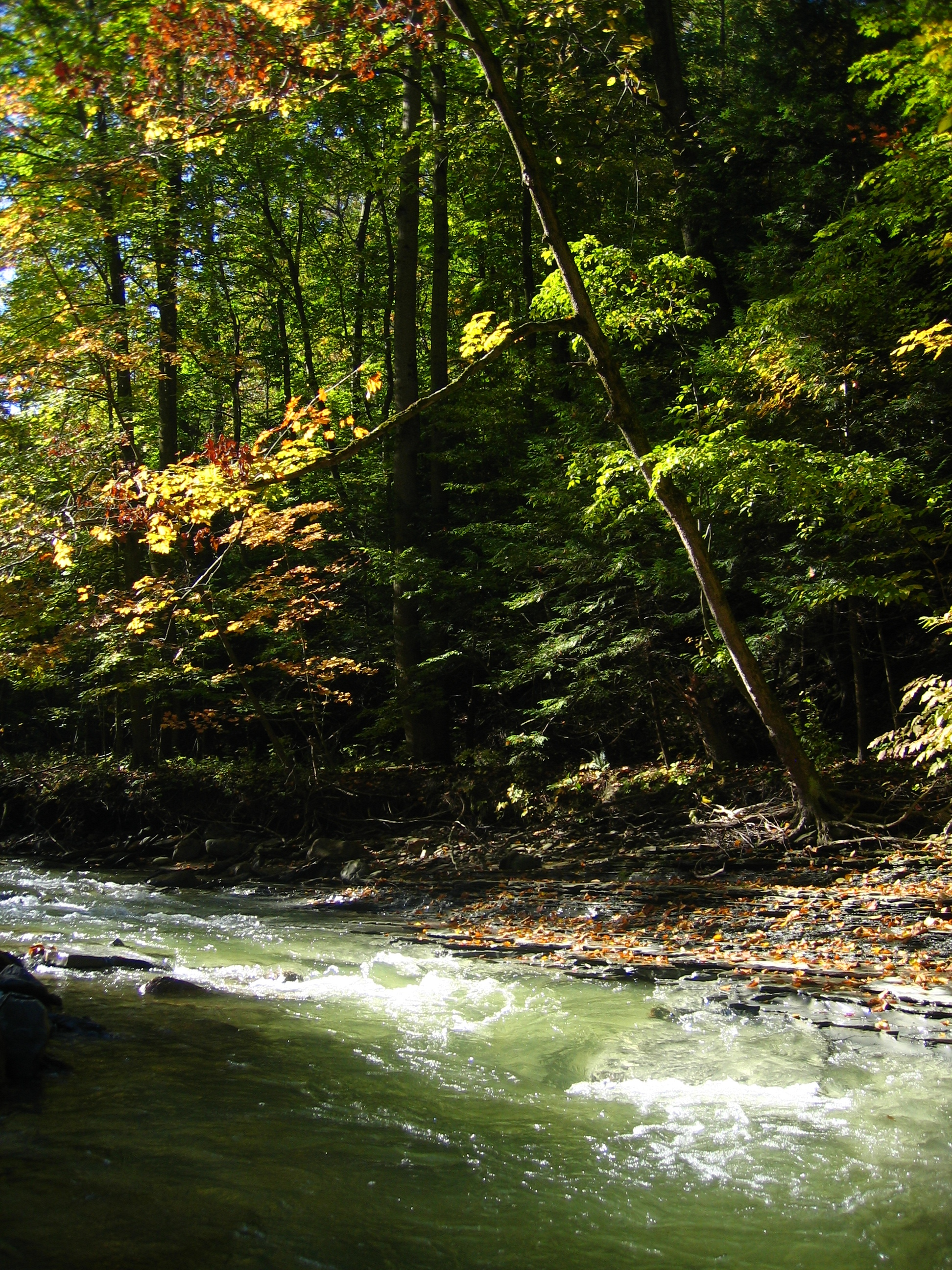
- Early Autumn on Chautauqua Creek

- Location of the mouth of Chautauqua Creek in New York State. Chautauqua Creek (the United States)

Location
- Country: United States
- State: New York
- Region: Chautauqua County

Physical characteristics
- Source: Sherman, New York
  - coordinates: 42°10′54″N 79°35′58″W
- Mouth
  - location: Lake Erie
  - coordinates: 42°20′16″N 79°36′24″W
  - elevation: 571 ft (174 m)
- Length: 15 mi (24 km)

Chautauqua Creek is a tributary of Lake Erie, approximately 15 miles (24 km) long, in the southwestern corner of New York in the United States. The headwaters of the creek rise in the town of Sherman, in Chautauqua County, and flow in a northerly direction through the town and village of Westfield where they empty into Lake Erie. For much of its length, the creek serves as the boundary line between the towns of Westfield and Chautauqua.

== History ==
Seneca lore states that Chautauqua Creek took its name from a native fishing trip: having caught some fish in Chautauqua Lake, they brought the fish by foot to Chautauqua Creek and, surprised that the fish had not suffocated without water, released them into the water. Some time later, the same Indians found that that species of fish, once absent from the creek, were now there and in Lake Erie in abundance. Thus, according to the story, both the creek and the lake were given the name of "fish taken out" in the local Erie language. The story may be apocryphal, as the natives had several other folk tales claiming to explain the lake and creek's name.

The creek is believed to have been discovered by French explorers as early as 1615, probably by Etienne Brule, a scout and interpreter for Samuel de Champlain. He learned, as Native Americans had known since ancient times, that a short portage between Lake Erie and Chautauqua Lake connected the Great Lakes and Mississippi River systems, by way of the Allegheny and Ohio Rivers. In 1753 the French cut a road to Chautauqua Lake, now known as the French Portage Road, to facilitate the transportation of men and materiel between the two systems. The road began at the mouth of Chautauqua Creek and ran parallel to it for approximately two miles, then scaled an escarpment and continued to what is now Mayville, New York, roughly in the same path as the present New York State Route 394.

In 1804, James McMahan, the first settler of Westfield, established a grist mill near the mouth of the creek, at the head of the old trail, and others followed. For the next century the creek powered grist mills, saw mills, carding mills, and other manufactories.

== Recreation ==
The creek is stocked with small numbers of brown trout but is more noted as a steelhead fishery, boasting the highest catch rate of any New York river at 1.4 steelhead per fishing hour.

== Literary references ==
In the novel, Button's Inn, published in 1887, Albion W. Tourgee wrote about the roadside inn, now gone, that stood three miles (5 km) uphill from Lake Erie, and the creek that flowed nearby:

At its very crest the hill was cloven by a yawning gorge, whose sides fell sheerly down to the level of a dashing stream that sped along its slippery bed a hundred feet below. Here ran one branch of an impetuous rivulet, that rising half a score of miles from the lake fought its way with devious windings through a thousand feet of hindering shale, down to the level of the sparkling lake. From source to mouth there was hardly a hundred yards of quiet water. It had cut the slaty layers smoothly off, so that the riven ends made a sheer wall, falling sharply to the water's edge on either side, and shutting out the sunshine save at midday, until it shot laughingly out from its prisoning banks, sparkled and gurgled for an instant over rounded stones, with the shelving beach-sands crumbling into it, and then lost itself in the blue bosom of the lake.

Innumerable springs oozed through the severed laminæ and trickled down the shelving sides, wearing sharp furrows in the crumbling rock in which the silvery rills were oft half-hidden by the hemlocks and beeches whose moss-clad roots found precarious hold upon the narrow ledges, while the ferns grew rank upon the dripping sides. For miles the stream rushed silent and swift between its shadowing walls, inaccessible to human foot, save here and there where an impetuous tributary had cut a difficult path to the bottom of the cañon.

Almost noiselessly the little stream swept over its slippery bed, murmuring gently as it shot down some self-made flume into a deeper pool evenly hollowed in the soft smooth rock, sped quickly round and round a few times, and then glided swiftly on over the shallow ripple below. In these pools the water had a greenish tinge when the sunshine touched it, as if it had caught an emerald tint from the tender overhanging verdure. It must have suited admirably the complexions of the wood-nymphs who no doubt once sported in these secluded dells. Here and there where the shelving soil had been heaped against the side of the cliff and the restless stream had ceased to undermine it the hemlocks grew dark and high, so that their topmost branches showed sometimes above the level of the banks. Even yet there are few more romantic scenes, cosier nooks or wilder bits than are found in this rugged glen that stretches back into the heart of the Chautauqua hills, with the emerald-tinted stream speeding swiftly and fiercely, yet almost noiselessly, along the smooth but sinuous channel its restless waters have so deftly carved in the soft, gray, slippery shale. Heaven grant that the foot of the despoiler may be long delayed, and that the trout which hide in its cool waters may long continue too wary and too few to tempt the pot hunter to the unprofitable task of their extermination!
