= Jamestown Downtown Historic District =

Historic district in New York, United States

- U.S. National Register of Historic Places
- U.S. Historic district
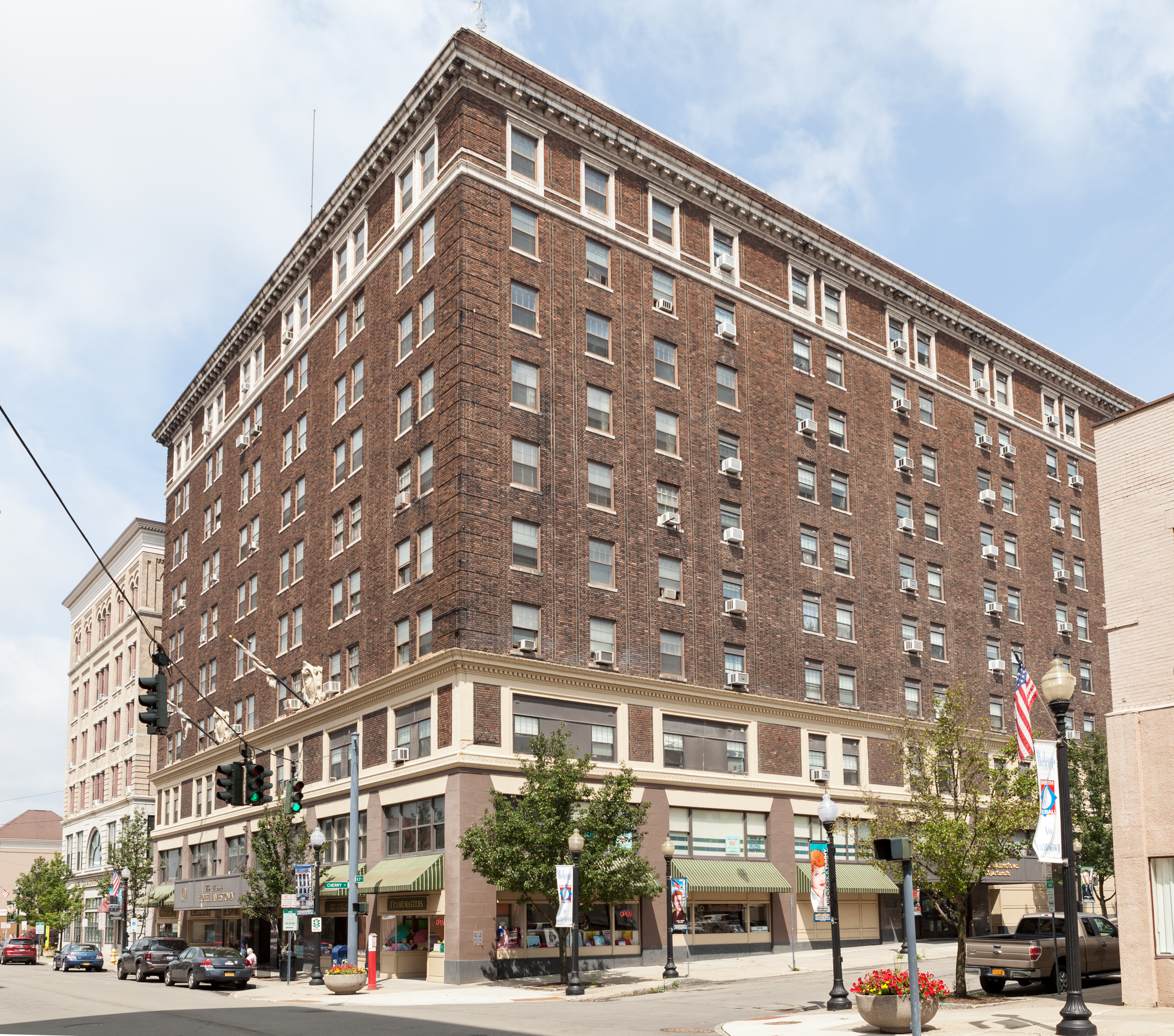
- Hotel Jamestown, July 2015

- Location within New York Location within the United States
- Location: 23-28, 20-408 N. Main, 200-322 Washington, 201-326 Cherry, 207-317 Pine, 215-417 Spring, 8-21, 100-200 E. 4th Sts., Jamestown, New York
- Coordinates: 42°05′47″N 79°14′29″W
- Area: 34.19 acres (13.84 ha)
- Built: c. 1873-1956
- Architectural style: Italianate, Gothic Revival, Second Empire, Romanesque Revival, Classical Revival, Renaissance Revival, Art Deco
- NRHP reference No.: 14000935
- Added to NRHP: November 19, 2014

Jamestown Downtown Historic District is a national historic district located at Jamestown in Chautauqua County, New York. The district encompasses 103 contributing buildings in the central business district of Jamestown. The district developed between about 1873 and 1956, and includes buildings in a variety of architectural styles including Italianate, Gothic Revival, Second Empire, Romanesque Revival, Classical Revival, Renaissance Revival, and Art Deco. Located in the district is the separately listed Wellman Building. Other notable buildings include St. Luke's Episcopal Church (1894), the Arcade Building (1898), Odd Fellows Lodge (1914), Bank of Jamestown (1918, 1924), Hotel Samuels (1910), Hotel Jamestown (1924), Chautauqua School of Nursing (1911), Jamestown Telephone Company (1930), Maddox Building (1933), First National Bank (1953), Pennsylvania Gas Company building (ca. 1955), Chautauqua National Bank (1956), Palace Theatre (now the Reg Lenna Center for the Arts, 1923), Allen's Opera House (now Lucille Ball Little Theatre, 1875), and the former Broadhead Worsted Mills (ca. 1870–1888).

It was listed on the National Register of Historic Places in 2014. The creation of the Historic District is an important step in preserving Jamestown's downtown urban core--as it opens up State funding for historical preservation projects. For instance, St. Luke's Episcopal Church has been awarded two $500,000 preservation awards from the NYS Parks and Historical Preserveration Office to preserve its unstable belltower (in 2018) and for to restore its pealing porches (in 2024).
