= L. Bliss House =

Historic house in New York, United States

- U.S. National Register of Historic Places
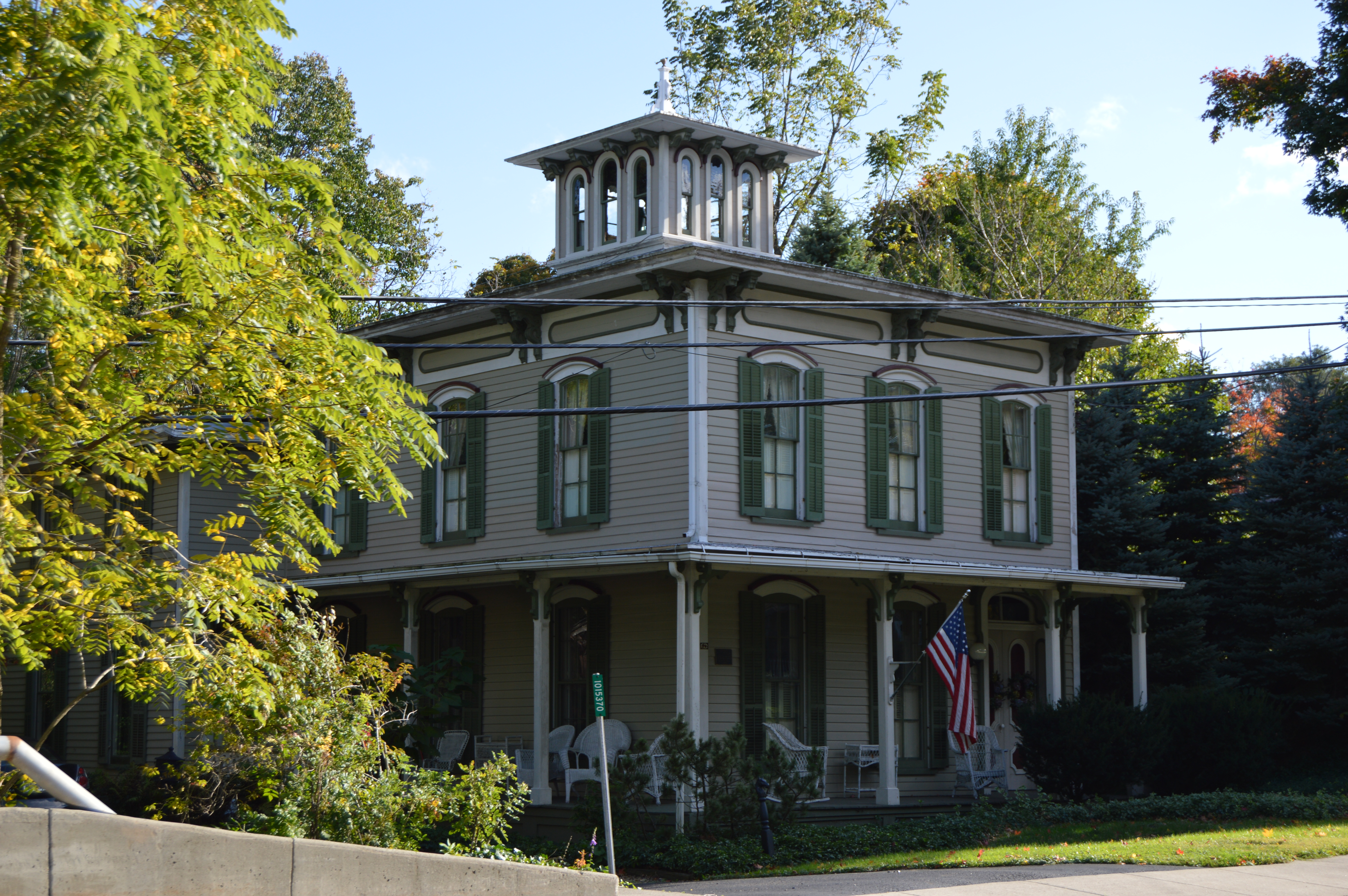
- Front and eastern side

- Location within New York Location within the United States
- Location: 90 W. Main St., Westfield, New York
- Coordinates: 42°19′9″N 79°34′55″W
- Built: 1853
- Architectural style: Italian Villa
- MPS: Westfield Village MRA
- NRHP reference No.: 83001647
- Added to NRHP: September 26, 1983

The L. Bliss House is a historic house located at 90 West Main Street in Westfield, Chautauqua County, New York.

== Description and history ==
It is a two-story, wood-framed Italian Villa style dwelling built in 1853. It is believed to have been built for Lorenzo Bliss, a local brewer.

It was listed on the National Register of Historic Places on September 26, 1983.
