= Abiah Bliss House =

Historic house in Massachusetts, United States

- U.S. National Register of Historic Places
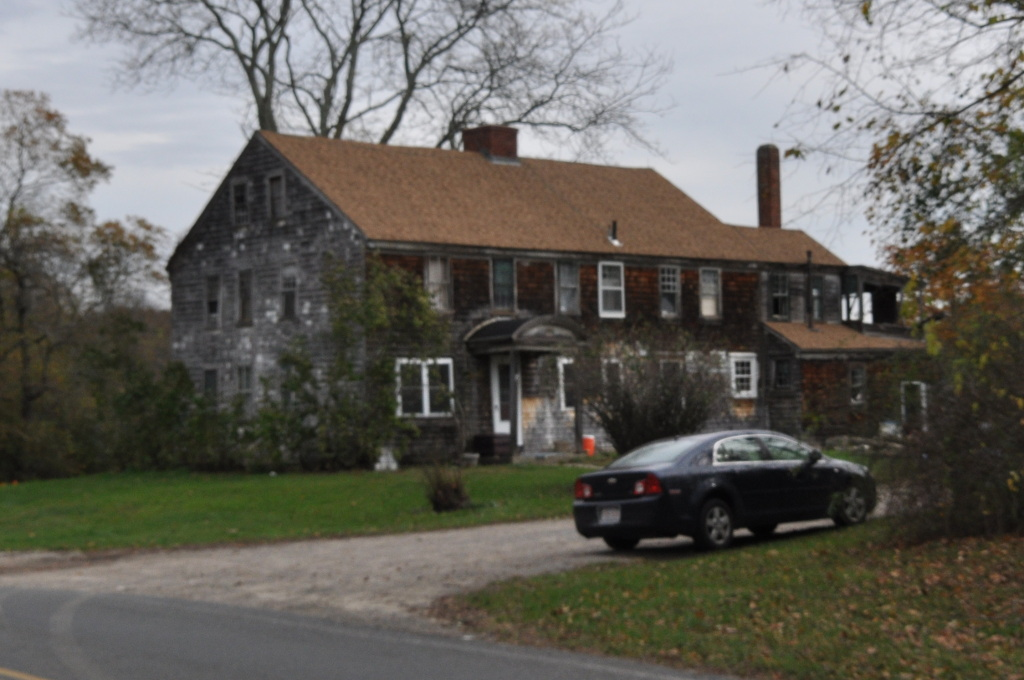

- Location within Massachusetts Location within the United States
- Location: 147 Agricultural Ave., Rehoboth, Massachusetts
- Coordinates: 41°53′20″N 71°16′29″W
- Area: 12 acres (4.9 ha)
- Built: 1666 (traditional) c.1740 (arc. evidence)
- MPS: Rehoboth MRA
- NRHP reference No.: 83000625
- Added to NRHP: June 6, 1983

The Abiah Bliss House is a historic house located at 147 Agricultural Avenue in Rehoboth, Massachusetts. With a claimed initial construction date of 1666, it is one of the oldest surviving buildings in the Rehoboth area.

== Description and history ==
The house stands in a rural area of northern Rehoboth, on the south side of Agricultural Avenue east of its junction with Rocky Hill Road. It is a 2 1/2-story, wood-framed house, with a gabled roof, roughly centered chimney, and an ell extending to the right side. It is oriented facing west, and has an asymmetrically arranged six-bay front facade. Its main entrance is in the third bay from the left, sheltered by a small porch with a segmented-arch pediment. The third bay from the right exhibits evidence of once also housing an entrance, but now houses a window.

The house has a complex construction history, which may begin as early as 1666, making it one of the oldest houses in the region, and one of the few to survive King Philip's War, which ravaged the area in the 1670s. The property was traditionally owned by Jonathan Bliss, and the southern three bays are said to have been built by him. Architectural evidence suggests that this portion was built before 1740. The northern extension was made in the mid-18th century. The southern ell is a three-bay timber-framed former barn, which also dates to the 18th century. It was in the Bliss family into at least the 20th century.

It was listed on the National Register of Historic Places on June 6, 1983.

== See also ==
- National Register of Historic Places listings in Bristol County, Massachusetts
