= Westfield station (Lake Shore and Michigan Southern Railway) =

Train station in Westfield, New York

Westfield
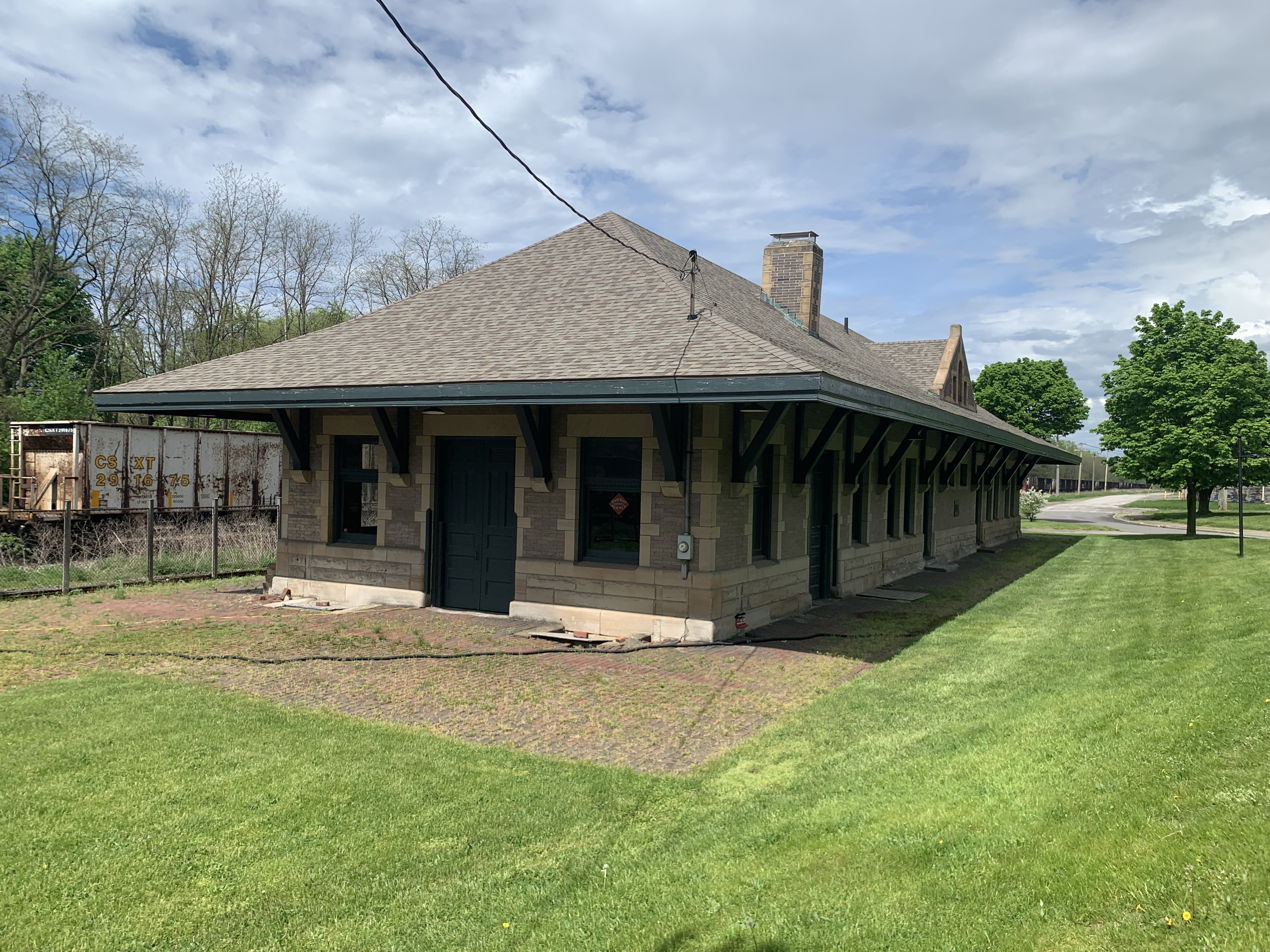
- Lake Shore and Michigan Southern Railway Station, June 2022

General information
- Location: English Street, Westfield, New York
- Coordinates: 42°19′42″N 79°34′55″W
- Tracks: 2

History
- Closed: 1971

Former services
| Preceding station | New York Central Railroad | Following station |
|---|---|---|
| Forsyth toward Chicago | Main Line | Portland toward New York |
- Lake Shore and Michigan Southern Railway Station
- U.S. National Register of Historic Places
- Location within New York Location within the United States
- Location: English Street, Westfield, New York
- Coordinates: 42°19′42″N 79°34′55″W
- Built: 1904
- Architect: Lake Shore and Michigan Southern Railway
- Architectural style: Romanesque
- MPS: Westfield Village MRA
- NRHP reference No.: 83003897
- Added to NRHP: December 16, 1983
Location

Westfield station is a historic train station located at Westfield in Chautauqua County, New York. It was constructed in 1904, for the Lake Shore and Michigan Southern Railway (absorbed in 1914 by the New York Central Railroad). It is a 1 1/2-story brick, terra cotta, and sandstone structure in the Romanesque style. It served as the main transfer point for rail passengers destined for the Chautauqua Institution. The Jamestown, Westfield and Northwestern Railroad interurban, serving the eastern part of Chautauqua used the station. The Chautauqua Traction Company, serving the Chautauqua hamlet, used the Nickel Plate Railroad's station in Westfield.

It is co-located with the Lake Shore & Michigan Southern Freight Depot.

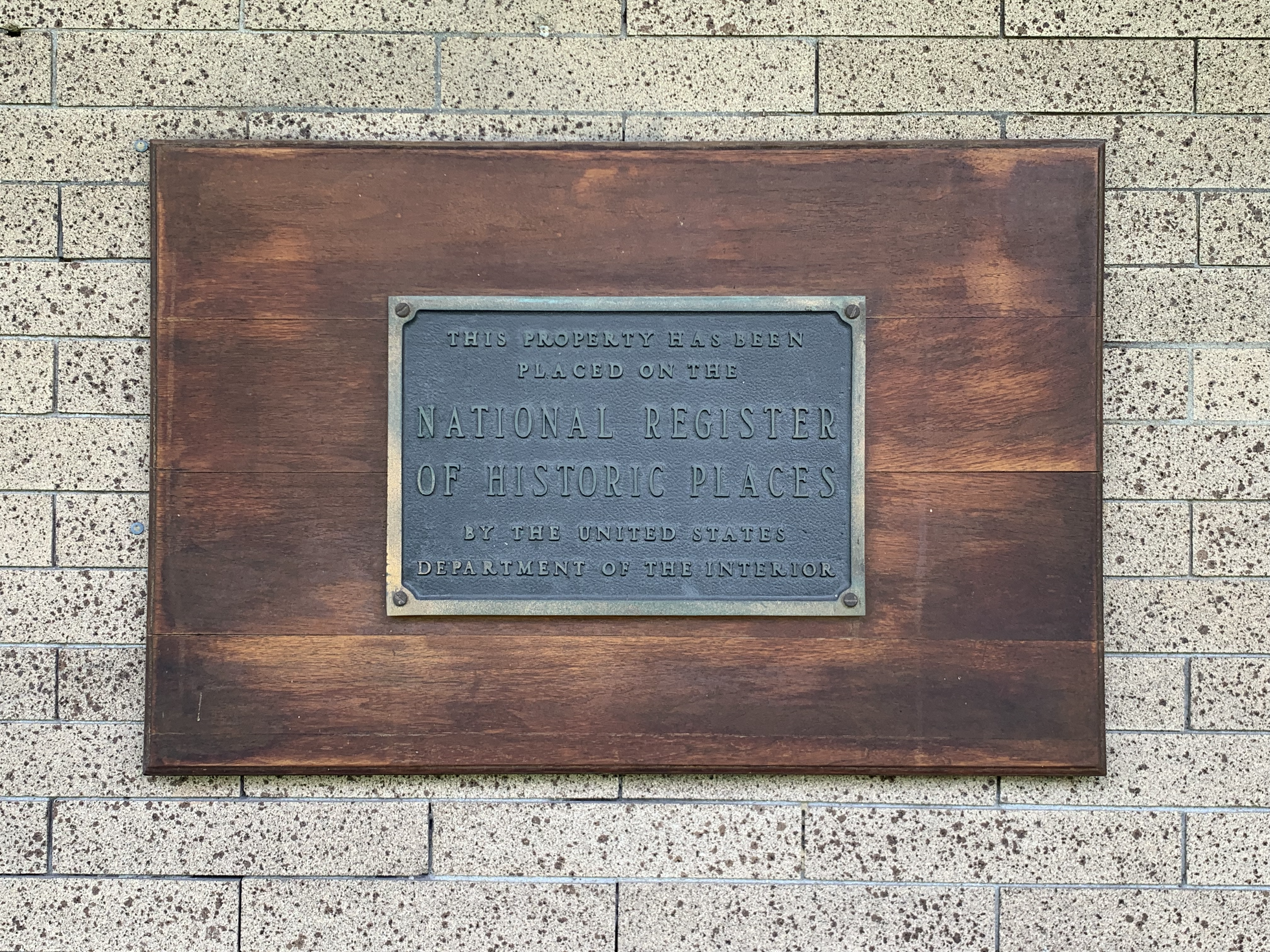
NRHP plaque

It was listed on the National Register of Historic Places in 1983 as the Lake Shore and Michigan Southern Railway Station.
