= The Wellman Building =

Historic commercial building in New York, United States

- U.S. National Register of Historic Places
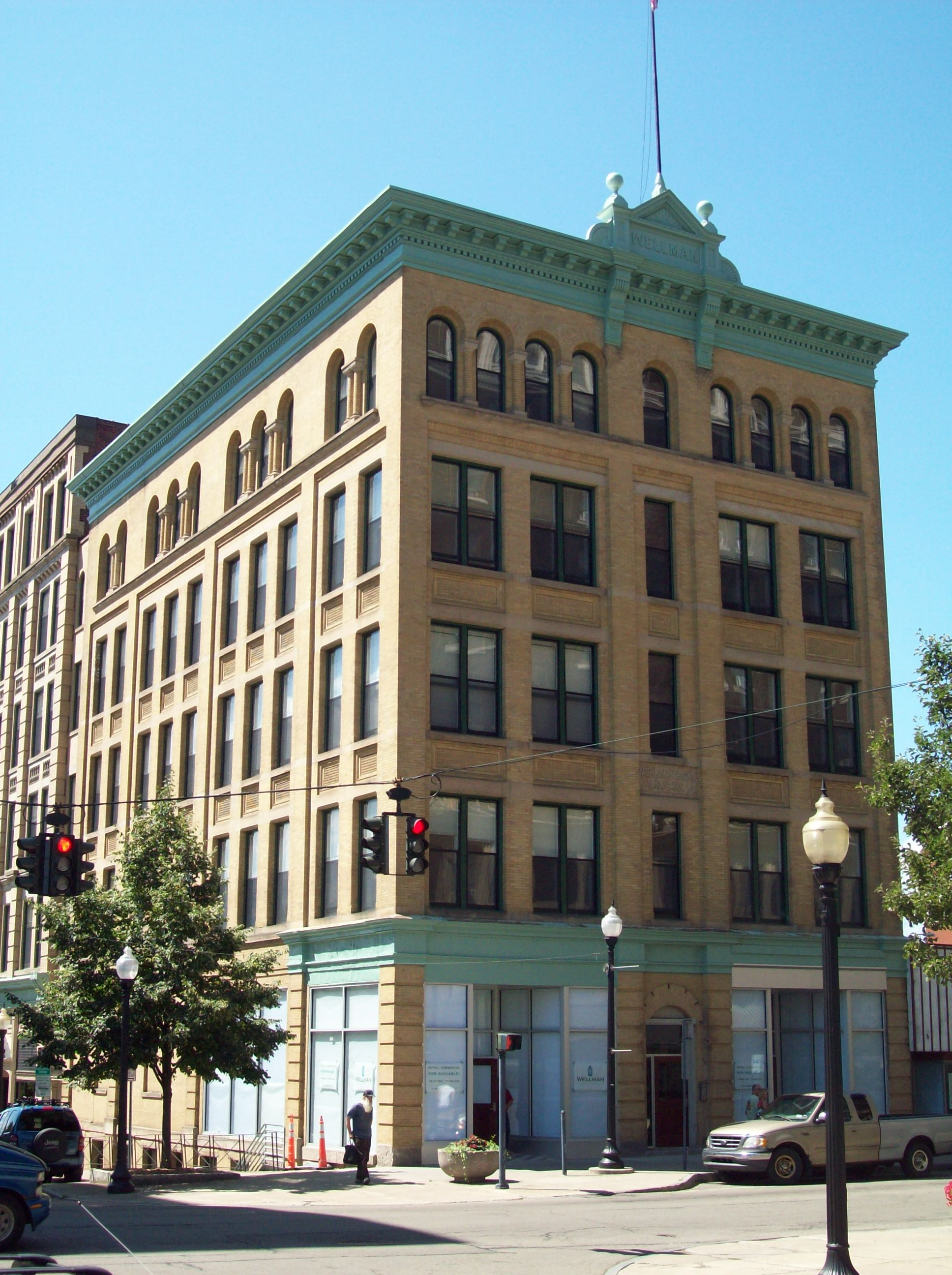
- The Wellman Building, July 2012

- Location within New York Location within the United States
- Location: 101-103 W. 3rd St. & 215-217 Cherry St., Jamestown, New York
- Coordinates: 42°05′45.32″N 79°14′33.43″W
- Area: .25 acres (0.10 ha)
- Built: 1897, 1910
- Architect: Aaron Hall and Son
- Architectural style: Renaissance Revival
- NRHP reference No.: 09000629
- Added to NRHP: August 21, 2009

The Wellman Building, also known as the Wellman Block, is a historic commercial building located at Jamestown in Chautauqua County, New York. It consists of an 1897 masonry bearing wall structure and a steel frame structure built in 1910. The 1897 building is a five-story, Renaissance Revival brick building. The 1910 addition retains the Renaissance Revival style. The building originally housed a druggist and stationery store on the first floor, with offices on the upper floors.

It was listed on the National Register of Historic Places in 2009.
