= Westfield (village), New York =

Westfield, New York
- Village
- Location within the state of New York
- Coordinates: 42°19′19″N 79°34′32″W
- Country: United States
- State: New York
- County: Chautauqua
- Town: Westfield

Area
  - Total: 3.78 sq mi (9.80 km^{2})
  - Land: 3.78 sq mi (9.80 km^{2})
  - Water: 0 sq mi (0.00 km^{2})
- Elevation: 745 ft (227 m)

Population (2020)
  - Total: 2,910
  - Density: 769.0/sq mi (296.93/km^{2})
- Time zone: UTC-5 (Eastern (EST))
  - Summer (DST): UTC-4 (EDT)
- ZIP code: 14787
- Area code: 716
- FIPS code: 36-79939
- GNIS feature ID: 0970918
- Website: www.villageofwestfield.org

Westfield is a village in Chautauqua County, New York, United States. The population was 2993 at the 2020 census. The village lies within the town of Westfield in the northern part of the county.

The village is known as the "grape juice capital of the world" because it lies roughly in the geographical center of 30,000 acres (120 km^{2}) of vineyards, most of which are the Concord grapes from which grape juice is produced, for years was corporate headquarters for the Welch's Grape Juice company, and is still home to a Welch's processing plant and other grape-related manufacturers.

Significant institutions in the village include the McClurg Mansion, Westfield Memorial Hospital, Westfield Academy and Central School (no longer an "academy" in any formal, 19th cenyury sense), and the Patterson Library.

== History ==
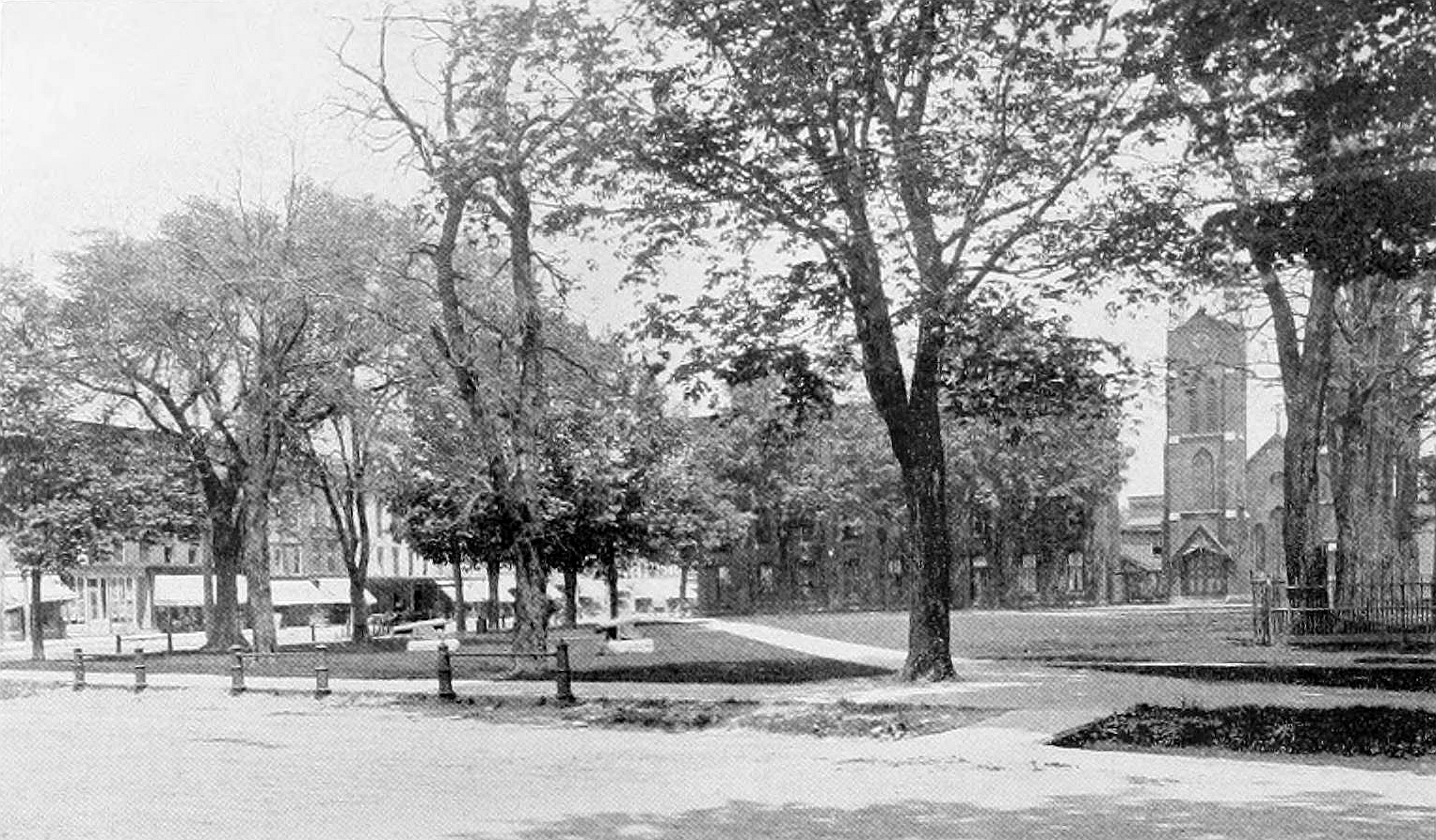
Westfield, 1921

The community was settled in 1802 and was formerly known as "Crossroads". The village of Westfield was incorporated in 1833. The discovery of a pasteurization method for grape juice made by the Welch family promoted the production of grapes for this purpose in this region.

It was here in 1861 that Abraham Lincoln met a little girl named Grace Bedell, who, during the preceding year's presidential campaign, urged Lincoln by letter to grow his beard out fully as an attempt to improve his chances at being elected. Lincoln responded by brief letter thanking Grace for the suggestion. He made no promises but shortly afterwards allowed his beard to grow, and by the time he began his inaugural journey by train from Illinois to Washington, D.C., he had a full beard. The trip took him through New York State, and included a stop in Westfield, where thousands gathered to meet the President-Elect. Lincoln asked by name to meet Grace Bedell.

The February 19, 1861, edition of the New York World recounted the meeting as follows:

"At Westfield an interesting incident occurred. Shortly after his nomination Mr. Lincoln had received from that place a letter from a little girl, who urged him, as a means of improving his personal appearance, to wear whiskers. Mr. Lincoln at the time replied, stating that although he was obliged by the suggestion, he feared his habits of life were too fixed to admit of even so slight a change as that which letting his beard grow involved. To-day, on reaching the place, he related the incident, and said that if that young lady was in the crowd he should be glad to see her. There was a momentary commotion, in the midst of which an old man, struggling through the crowd, approached, leading his daughter, a girl of apparently twelve or thirteen years of age, whom he introduced to Mr. Lincoln as his Westfield correspondent. Mr. Lincoln stooped down and kissed the child, and talked with her for some minutes. Her advice had not been thrown away upon the rugged chieftain. A beard of several months' growth covers (perhaps adorns) the lower part of his face. The young girl's peachy cheek must have been tickled with a stiff whisker, for the growth of which she was herself responsible."

Today there is a small park in Westfield commemorating this meeting, on the former site of the Grand Theatre movie house.

The celebrated author of juvenile adventure novels, Charles Austin Fosdick, better known by his pen name, Harry Castlemon, lived in Westfield for most of his adult life and is buried in the Westfield Cemetery. He was the most-read author for boys in the post-Civil War era.

== Geography ==
Westfield is at the second westernmost exit on Interstate 90 (the New York State Thruway) before it reaches the Pennsylvania border. It is a short distance north of Chautauqua Lake and the tourist attractions there including Chautauqua Institution.

According to the United States Census Bureau, the village has a total area of 3.8 square miles (9.9 km^{2}), all land. The center of Westfield is approximately 1 mile (1.6 km) south of the shore of Lake Erie.

The most significant geographical feature in the village is the gorge of Chautauqua Creek, which flows roughly north-south, on the way to Lake Erie, just west of the main intersection in the village (that of Portage Street, NY 394, and Main Street, US 20).

== Demographics ==
Historical population
Census	Pop.	Note	%±
1870	3,000		—
1880	1,924		−35.9%
1890	1,983		3.1%
1900	2,430		22.5%
1910	2,985		22.8%
1920	3,413		14.3%
1930	3,466		1.6%
1940	3,434		−0.9%
1950	3,663		6.7%
1960	3,878		5.9%
1970	3,651		−5.9%
1980	3,446		−5.6%
1990	3,451		0.1%
2000	3,481		0.9%
2010	3,224		−7.4%
2020	2,993		−7.2%
2021 (est.)	2,969		−0.8%
U.S. Decennial Census

As of the census of 2000, there were 3,481 people, 1,367 households, and 918 families residing in the village. The population density was 914.1 inhabitants per square mile (352.9/km^{2}). There were 1,476 housing units at an average density of 387.6 per square mile (149.7/km^{2}). The racial makeup of the village was 96.09% White, 0.40% Black or African American, 0.29% Native American, 0.57% Asian, 1.81% from other races, and 0.83% from two or more races. Hispanic or Latino of any race were 3.27% of the population.

There were 1,367 households, out of which 32.7% had children under the age of 18 living with them, 52.9% were married couples living together, 11.4% had a female householder with no husband present, and 32.8% were non-families. 28.2% of all households were made up of individuals, and 12.7% had someone living alone who was 65 years of age or older. The average household size was 2.46 and the average family size was 3.00.

In the village, the population was spread out, with 26.0% under the age of 18, 6.7% from 18 to 24, 26.0% from 25 to 44, 22.2% from 45 to 64, and 19.1% who were 65 years of age or older. The median age was 40 years. For every 100 females there were 90.4 males. For every 100 females age 18 and over, there were 85.4 males.

The median income for a household in the village was $32,136, and the median income for a family was $43,028. Males had a median income of $30,878 versus $22,500 for females. The per capita income for the village was $15,828. About 11.1% of families and 17.4% of the population were below the poverty line, including 21.1% of those under age 18 and 19.1% of those age 65 or over.
