= New York State Route 83 =

State highway in Chautauqua County, New York, US

New York State Route 83
- Map of Cattaraugus and Chautauqua counties with NY 83 highlighted in red

Route information
- Maintained by NYSDOT
- Length: 21.82 mi (35.12 km)
- Existed: 1930–present

Major junctions
- South end: US 62 in Ellington
- North end: NY 60 in Pomfret

Location
- Country: United States
- State: New York
- Counties: Chautauqua

Highway system
- New York Highways; Interstate; US; State; Reference; Parkways
| ← NY 82 | → I-84 |

New York State Route 83 (NY 83) is a state route located entirely in Chautauqua County, New York, in the United States. It extends from an intersection with U.S. Route 62 (US 62) in the hamlet of Conewango Valley (at the Cattaraugus County border) to NY 60 in the hamlet of Laona, near Fredonia. Along the way, NY 83 intersects with NY 322 at Balcom Corners and serves the hamlet of Cherry Creek.

NY 83 initially extended south to Frewsburg when it was assigned as part of the 1930 renumbering. The portion of the route between Frewsburg and Conewango Valley became part of US 62 c. 1932, resulting in the truncation of NY 83 to its current southern terminus in the 1940s.

== Route description ==
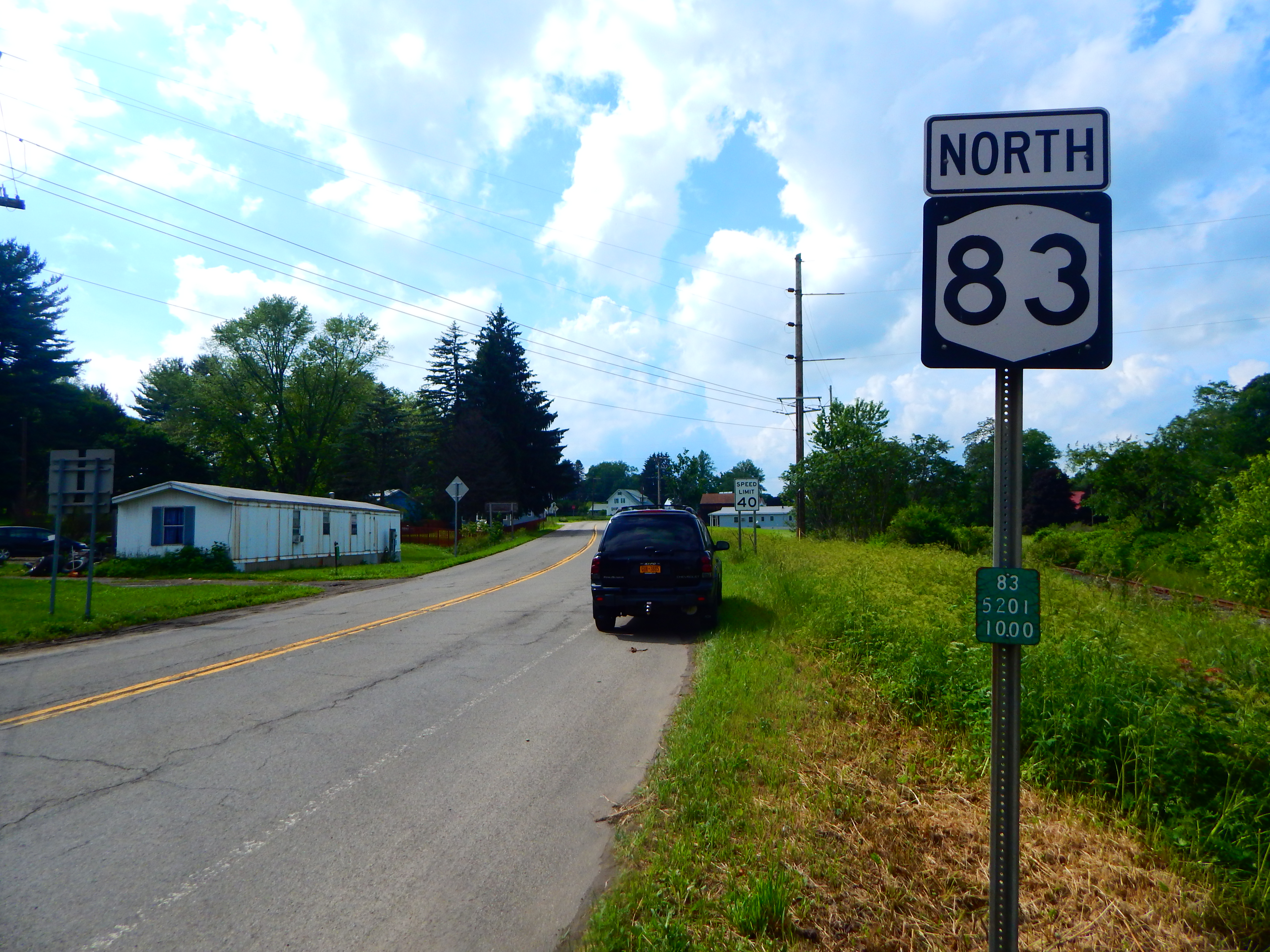
NY 83 in Conewango Valley, heading away from US 62

NY 83 begins at US 62 in the hamlet of Conewango Valley, located in the northeastern corner of the town of Ellington. The route heads north-northwestward, paralleling a pair of train tracks, and shortly after enters the hamlet of Cherry Creek, where it intersects County Route 70 (CR 70) and CR 68, respectively. Known as Main Street, it bows out to the east slightly, and subsequently takes on a due north path as it heads through the town of Cherry Creek. A couple miles later, it reaches the hamlet of Balcom Corners (located in the town of Villenova), a community situated at the junction of NY 83 and the western terminus of NY 322. Here, NY 83 turns westward toward the community of Hamlet, where it intersects with CR 72.

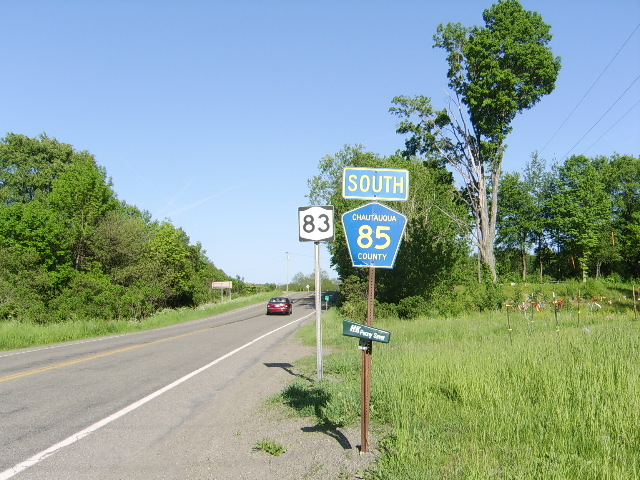
These signposts in Arkwright show CR 85 running concurrently with NY 83.

NY 83 begins a more erratic routing, passing between West Mud Lake and Black Pond as it enters the town of Arkwright. For a short distance it is concurrent with CR 85, and takes on the name Black Corner Street, so named because it is located within the hamlet of Black Corners. Although this portion of NY 83 is cosigned with CR 85, it is maintained by the New York State Department of Transportation. An intersection with CR 79 is not far off, as it passes just north of the town of Arkwright. NY 83 proceeds west-northwest until it reaches its ending terminus at NY 60 in the community of Laona, located just west of the Arkwright town line in Pomfret.

== History ==
NY 83 was assigned as part of the 1930 renumbering of state highways in New York to an alignment extending from Frewsburg in the south to Laona in the north. US 62 was extended into New York c. 1932, overlapping NY 83 from Frewsburg to Conewango Valley. The overlap was eliminated in the 1940s when NY 83 was truncated to its junction with US 62 in Conewango Valley.

== Major intersections ==
The entire route is in Chautauqua County.

| Location | mi | km | Destinations | Notes |
|---|---|---|---|---|
| Ellington | 0.00 | 0.00 | US 62 – Buffalo | Southern terminus; Hamlet of Conewango Valley |
| Villenova | 9.62 | 15.48 | NY 322 east – South Dayton | Hamlet of Balcom Corners; western terminus of NY 322 |
| Pomfret | 21.82 | 35.12 | NY 60 to I-90 – Jamestown, Fredonia | Northern terminus; Hamlet of Laona |
1.000 mi = 1.609 km; 1.000 km = 0.621 mi
