= List of New York State Historic Markers in Chautauqua County, New York =

This is a complete list of New York State Historic Markers in Chautauqua County, New York.

== Listings county-wide ==
	Marker name	Image	Date designated	Location	City or Town	Marker text
1	First Oil Well			On Co. Rd. About 2 Mis. S. Of Forestville	Arkwright, New York	First Oil Well In Arkwright Was Erected On This Site About 1840
2	First Cheese Factory			On Co. Rd. At Griswold	Arkwright, New York	First Cheese Factory In Chautauqua County Erected Here In 1861 By Asahel Burnham
3	First Cheese Factory			On Nys 60 At Kiantone-Carroll Town Line	Carroll, New York	Frew House First House Erected In Fewsburg. Built 1807 By Hugh And Mary R. Frew.
4	Home Of James And Mary W. Frew			On Nys 60 In Frewsburg	Carroll, New York	Home Of James And Mary W. Frew Built 1821.
5	Home Of James And Mary W. Frew			On Nys 60 In Frewsburg	Carroll, New York	Home Of James And Mary W. Frew Built 1821.
6	Home Of James And Mary W. Frew			On Nys 430 In Vlge. Of Mayville	Chautauqua, New York	Donald Mackenzie Born In Scotland 1783 Died In Mayville 1851 At One Time Partner Of John Jacob Astor In Pacific Fur Company
7	First Settler On Chautauqua Lake			On Nys 17J In Vlge. Of Mayville	Chautauqua, New York	First Settler On Chautauqua Lake Was Dr. Alexander Mcintyre Who Erected Here His Log Cabin And Stockade
8	Land Office			On Nys 17 In Vlge. Of Mayville	Chautauqua, New York	Here In 1810 William Peacock, Local Agent Of Holland Land Co. Built His Cabin And Office Of Logs. He Served 26 Years
9	Mackenzie Home			On Nys 17, Vlge. Of Mayville	Chautauqua, New York	Here In 1833 Donald Mackenzie, Famous In North West Fur Trade Built His Dwelling
10	Pioneer Home			On Co. Rd. 2 Mis. S. Chautauqua	Chautauqua, New York	Pioneer Home June, 1806 William And June, 1806 William And Family Settled In A Log House. Sons Notable In County History
11	Site Of Scott Tavern			On Nys 17J, Vlge. Of Mayville	Chautauqua, New York	Site Of Scott Tavern First Board Of Supervisors Met Here. Several Of The Early Courts Were Held Here
12	Site Of Scott Tavern			On Nys 17 At Levant	Ellicott, New York	Nathan Brown In 1850s Built Flat Boats Loaded With Jamestown Yankee Notions, Set Out For South. For Years Boats Took Lading Here.
13	Amos Sottle			On Town Rd. About 1 Mile South Of Irving	Hanover, New York	1796 Amos Sottle 1000 Ft. N.W. Of This Point Amos Sottle, First Settler In Eastern Chautauqua County Erected His Log Cabin
14	La Grange			On Us 20 At Irving	Irving, New York	1796 Irving Was First Called La Grange And Its First Settler Was Amos Sottle Who Built His Cabin 3/4 Miles South Of This Point
15	1st Textile Mill			On East 1 St Street	Jamestown, New York	Here In 1816 First Woolen Mill Was Built By Daniel Hazeltine. Here Was Dyed And Finished Cloth Woven On Hand- Looms By Women In Early Homes.
16	First Sash Factory			On Windsor Street	Jamestown, New York	Built here 1826, in 1845 doors and blinds were also manufactured. From 1829 these wares were shipped south on flat boats many years.
17	First Train			On Main Street	Jamestown, New York	Arrived In Jamestown August 25, 1861 Over The Newly Laid Rails Of The Atlantic and Great Western Railroad.
18	James Prendergast			On West 2nd Street	Jamestown, New York	Here In 1811 James Prendergast Built A Log House, Saw- Mill And Dam, Beginning Of Jamestown Industry Building Burned 1812
19	Station Of Underground R.R.			On 7th Street	Jamestown, New York	Here Stood A Station Of Underground R.R In Which Catherine Harris Did Heroic Service For Fugitive Slaves
20	Reuben E. Fenton			On South Main Street	Jamestown, New York	Home Of Reuben E. Fenton The Soldiers' Friend Governor 1865-1869 U.S. Senator 1869-1875
21	Log Cabin			On Fairmont Avenue	Jamestown, New York	Log Cabin 1810 Here John Blowers Built First Home In Jamestown And Mary Blowers, First White Child Was Born That Winter
22	Site Of Quaker School			On Foote Avenue	Jamestown, New York	So Named Because Mary E. Osborne, A Quakeress Conducted It. 1833-1843
23	Site Of Jamestown Female Seminary			On North Main Street	Jamestown, New York	Site Of Jamestown Female Seminary 1849-1859, Clairissa D. Wheeler Founder And Head
24	Site of the Foote Home			On East 2nd Street	Jamestown, New York	Built In 1823 By Elial Todd Foote, Physician, Legislator, Jurist, Historian, Who Settled In Jamestown In 1815.
25	Site of Methodist Church			On 2nd Street	Jamestown, New York	First Edifice Of The Methodist Episcopal Church In Jamestown Was Erected In 1830. A Plain House 40 by 50 Feet.
26	Site of Pail Factory			On Windsor St.	Jamestown, New York	First Factory For Making Wooden Pails And Tubs Built In 1829, Large Industry For Years. First Flat Boat Stocks Built Here 1835.
27	White Franch And Indians			On Fairmont Avenue	Jamestown, New York	White Franch And Indians Passed Down The Chadakoin To The Allegany In 1749 Claiming The Territory, For France
27	First Settler			On Us 20 About 2 Mis. Ne Penna.-N.Y. State Line	Ripley, New York	Site Of 1804, First Settler In Chautauqua County
28	William Crossgrove			On Us 20 About 12 Mi. Ne Of Penna.-N.Y. State Line	Ripley, New York	Site Of Farm Of William Crossgrove, 1807 One Of Original Inhabitants Of Chautauqua County

== See also ==
- List of New York State Historic Markers
- National Register of Historic Places listings in New York
- List of National Historic Landmarks in New York
