= New York State Route 322 =

State highway in the Southern Tier of New York

New York State Route 322
- Map of Cattaraugus and Chautauqua counties with NY 322 highlighted in red

Route information
- Maintained by NYSDOT
- Length: 4.70 mi (7.56 km)
- Existed: 1930–present

Major junctions
- West end: NY 83 in Villenova
- East end: US 62 in Dayton

Location
- Country: United States
- State: New York
- Counties: Chautauqua, Cattaraugus

Highway system
- New York Highways; Interstate; US; State; Reference; Parkways
← NY 321	→ NY 323

New York State Route 322 (NY 322) is a state highway in the Southern Tier of New York in the United States. The western terminus of the route is at an intersection with NY 83 in Balcom Corners, a hamlet within the Chautauqua County town of Villenova. Its eastern terminus is at a junction with U.S. Route 62 (US 62) in the Cattaraugus County town of Dayton. In between, the route passes through the village of South Dayton.

NY 322 was assigned as part of the 1930 renumbering of state highways in New York to its current alignment. Originally, maintenance of the Cattaraugus County portion of the route was split between the village of South Dayton and the county, the latter of which co-designated the highway as County Route 3 (CR 3). The state of New York assumed ownership and maintenance of the Cattaraugus County segment in 1980 as part of a highway maintenance swap between the state, the county, and South Dayton.

== Route description ==
NY 322 is classified by the New York State Department of Transportation as a rural collector road. It serves as a connector from NY 83 to US 62 by way of the village of South Dayton. Most of the traffic along the route is made up of non-commercial vehicles; trucks account for only nine percent of all traffic along NY 322. The roadway has an asphalt surface that is two lanes wide and varies in width from 21 feet (6.4 m) to 22 feet (6.7 m). NY 322 travels through flat, open land outside of South Dayton and through residential areas within the village.

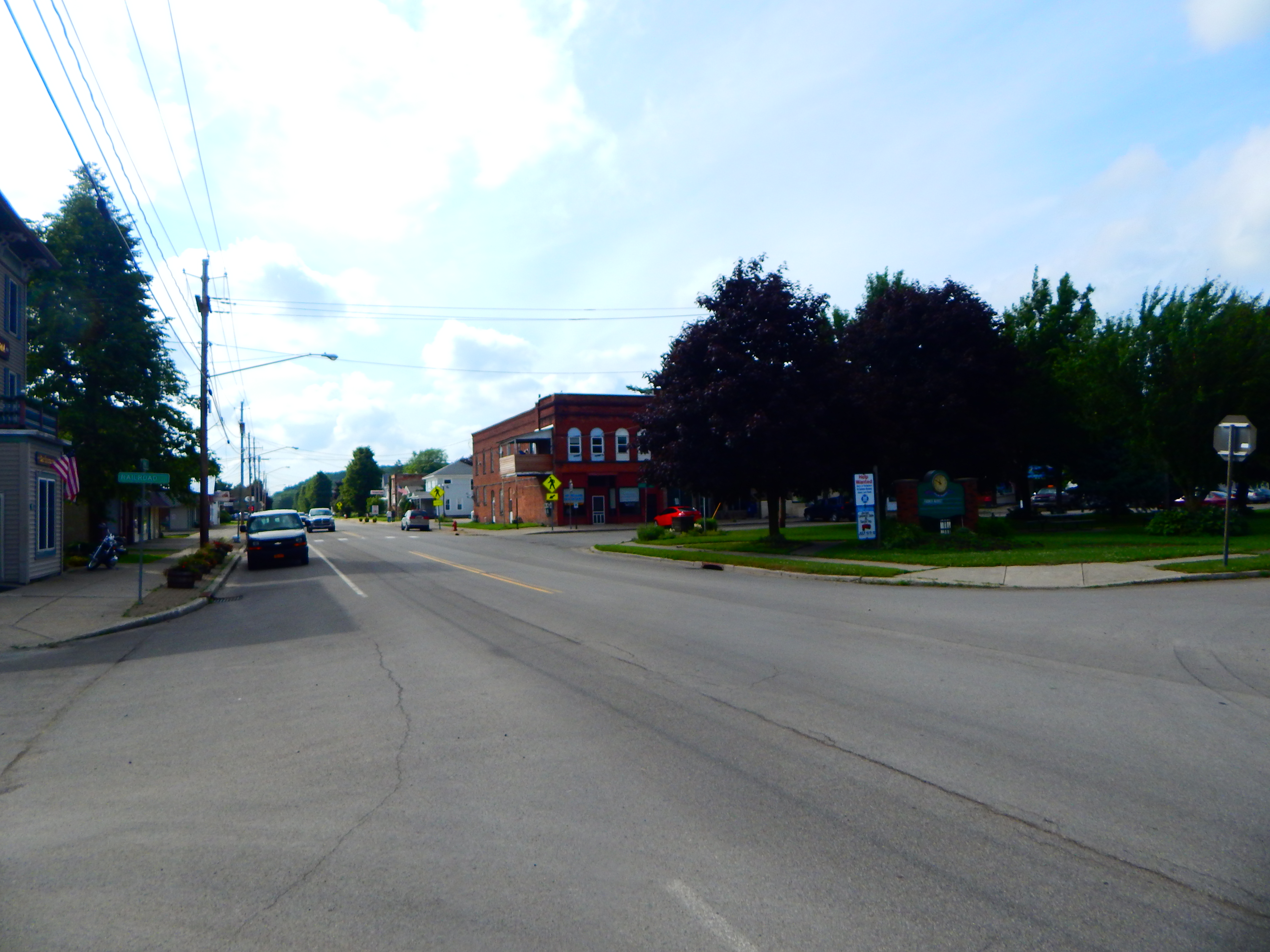
NY 322 west through South Dayton

The route begins at an intersection with NY 83 and CR 87 at Balcom Corners, a hamlet within the town of Villenova. It heads eastward, passing through open fields and a handful of homes. Roughly 0.75 miles (1.21 km) east of NY 83, the route meets the west branch of Conewango Creek and turns southeastward to follow the southern bank of the waterway. NY 322 passes over the creek just before crossing into Cattaraugus County and the village of South Dayton, located in the town of Dayton, that sits on the western county line.

In South Dayton, NY 322 is known as Pine Street as it proceeds through the village. The amount of development along the route rises as it approaches the center of the village at Main Street. The route continues, traveling by four blocks of homes and businesses before curving eastward and entering another area dominated by open fields. It exits the village limits shortly afterwards. East of South Dayton, NY 322 is known as Dexter Corners Road as it heads through a rural area of the town of Dayton. NY 322 continues to the community of Dexter Corners, where it ends at an intersection with US 62.

In 2008, the portion of NY 322 between NY 83 and the county line handled an estimated average of 1,810 vehicles per day. The traffic volume increases to 2,300 per day from there to Main Street in the village of South Dayton. East of Main Street, traffic volume falls to 1,280 cars per day.

== History ==
NY 322 was assigned to its modern alignment as part of the 1930 renumbering of state highways in New York. Initially, NY 322 was maintained by Cattaraugus County between the eastern village limits of South Dayton and its junction with NY 241 (now US 62) in Dayton and by the village of South Dayton within the village limits. The Cattaraugus County-maintained portion of the route was co-designated as CR 3. On April 1, 1980, ownership and maintenance of NY 322 in Cattaraugus County was transferred from the village of South Dayton and the county to the state of New York as part of a highway maintenance swap between the three levels of government. The entirety of the route is now state-maintained.

== Major intersections ==
County	Location	mi	km	Destinations	Notes
Chautauqua	Villenova	0.00	0.00	NY 83 – Fredonia, Cherry Creek, Jamestown	Hamlet of Balcom Corners; western terminus
Cattaraugus	Dayton	4.70	7.56	US 62	Eastern terminus
1.000 mi = 1.609 km; 1.000 km = 0.621 mi

== See also ==
- List of county routes in Cattaraugus County, New York
