= George Nelson Frost House, Cherry Creek, New York =

Coordinates: 42°17′55.5″N 79°7′42.7″W

The George Nelson Frost House is located in rural Cherry Creek, NY and now serves as a country bed and breakfast.

== History ==
The Cherry Creek Inn was built circa 1860 in the Italianate Villa style by George Nelson Frost, a member of the industrious pioneer family of George H. Frost. He was a successful mixed-husbandry farmer who kept horses, cattle and sheep, and also raised multiple varieties of hay, grains and fruits. In keeping with his other eclectic interests, George Nelson Frost was "widely known among lovers of fast horses" in the local racing circuits. His peers knew Frost to be a man of upright character and entrusted him with considerable sums of town money during the war of the Rebellion, where he was "charged with the duty of expending the same in the employment of men to fill its quotas of soldiers." His father, George H. Frost, was a well-known abolitionist whose 1845 farmhouse in Cherry Creek was a station on the Underground Railroad.

=== Architecture ===
The George N. Frost house is nestled on acres of idyllic farmland and is a superb example of the Italianate Villa architectural style. The octagonal wing is typical of the style, and the small arched windows in the transom over the doorway are sometimes dubbed 'tombstone lights.' Jewel Helen Conover compares the intricate porch to "an Italian loggia of the Renaissance." The house was carefully restored to National Register standards in the early 1990s and later converted into the Cherry Creek Inn Bed and Breakfast.

=== The Carriage House ===
The original Carriage House, lost to fire in 1947 and reported personally by the tenant farmers' son Ray Gooseman, who was rescued from the burning building, was a complex structure that probably stabled "two to six horses, garaged one or two carriages, stored riding gear, and provided hay lofts and feed bins." The new Carriage House was constructed in 2006 by the current owners of the George Nelson Frost House. A Portland Cutter sleigh and other horse related memorabilia are on display in the recreated Carriage House to honor George Nelson Frost and local racing enthusiast, Lyle Ivett.

== Cherry Creek, New York ==
Located in Chautauqua County, New York's westernmost county, Cherry Creek is surrounded by farms with what have been referred to as "Currier and Ives" views and vistas. This area is defined by its rural living, forests preserved by New York State, picturesque views, and acres of modern farmland as well as fields tended by Old Order Amish and their horses. Cherry Creek is at the entryway to 40 miles of equestrian trails which are being developed in the Boutwell Hill State Forest preserve.
