= Arkwright, New York =

- Town
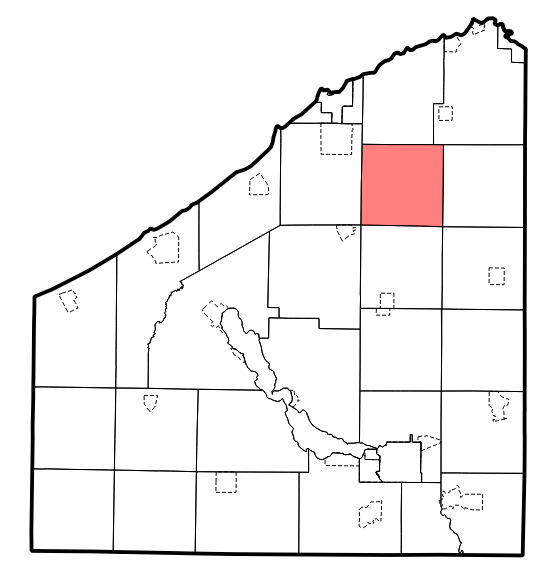
- Location within Chautauqua County

- Location within New York Location within the United States
- Coordinates: 42°23′23″N 79°14′35″W
- Country: United States
- State: New York
- County: Chautauqua

Government
  - Type: Town council
  - Town supervisor: Ted L. Wightman(D)
  - Town Council: Members' List: • Lawrence J. Ball; • Roger L. Cardot (D, R); • Linda M. Fairbanks (R); • James R. Shaffer

Area
  - Total: 35.74 sq mi (92.56 km^{2})
  - Land: 35.68 sq mi (92.40 km^{2})
  - Water: 0.062 sq mi (.16 km^{2})
- Elevation: 1,657 ft (505 m)

Population (2020)
  - Total: 1,000
  - Estimate (2021): 999
  - Density: 29.0/sq mi (11.21/km^{2})
- Time zone: UTC-5 (Eastern (EST))
  - Summer (DST): UTC-4 (EDT)
- ZIP Codes: 14062 (Forestville); 14063 (Fredonia); 14718 (Cassadaga); 14723 (Cherry Creek)
- FIPS code: 36-013-02605
- GNIS feature ID: 0978689
- Website: www.arkwrightny.gov

Arkwright is a town in Chautauqua County, New York, United States. As of the 2020 census, the town population was 1,000. It is named after Richard Arkwright, the inventor of a spinning device.

Arkwright is in the northeastern quadrant of Chautauqua County and is southeast of the city of Dunkirk.

== History ==
Settlement began circa 1807. The town of Arkwright was established in 1829 from the towns of Villenova and Pomfret.

Dairy farms and cheesemaking were important in the early economy. Arkwright was one of the first towns in New York to form a cheese cooperative.

== Geography ==
According to the United States Census Bureau, the town has a total area of 35.7 square miles (92.5 km^{2}), of which 35.7 square miles (92.4 km^{2}) is land and 0.08 square miles (0.2 km^{2}), or 0.17%, is water.

New York State Route 83 is a major east-west highway through the town.

Canadaway Creek passes through the south part of the town. Arkwright Falls is a picturesque and secluded waterfall along Canadaway Creek, along property off Park Road owned by descendants of Stanley Drozdiel. This property is posted, but the creek can be entered via the County Park along Ball Road. The creek is not open to public navigation, and does not fall under the terms of the New York State Public Right of Navigation. One can get to the Arkwright Falls by following the creek upstream from where the trail on the public property ends in the creek bed.

=== Adjacent towns and locations ===
The town of Pomfret is to the west, and the town of Villenova is to the east. The towns of Sheridan and Hanover are to the north, and the town of Charlotte is to the south.

== Demographics ==
Historical population
Census	Pop.	Note	%±
1830	926		—
1840	1,418		53.1%
1850	1,283		−9.5%
1860	1,103		−14.0%
1870	1,030		−6.6%
1880	1,076		4.5%
1890	886		−17.7%
1900	918		3.6%
1910	843		−8.2%
1920	757		−10.2%
1930	746		−1.5%
1940	688		−7.8%
1950	665		−3.3%
1960	700		5.3%
1970	833		19.0%
1980	980		17.6%
1990	1,040		6.1%
2000	1,126		8.3%
2010	1,061		−5.8%
2020	1,000		−5.7%
2021 (est.)	999		−0.1%
U.S. Decennial Census

As of the census of 2000, there were 1,126 people, 421 households, and 320 families residing in the town. The population density was 31.5 inhabitants per square mile (12.2/km^{2}). There were 509 housing units at an average density of 14.3 per square mile (5.5/km^{2}). The racial makeup of the town was 98.49% White, 0.27% African American, 0.62% Native American, 0.09% Asian, 0.09% Pacific Islander, 0.18% from other races, and 0.27% from two or more races. Hispanic or Latino people of any race were 1.51% of the population.

There were 421 households, out of which 34.4% had children under the age of 18 living with them, 63.7% were married couples living together, 9.3% had a female householder with no husband present, and 23.8% were non-families. 18.5% of all households were made up of individuals, and 6.4% had someone living alone who was 65 years of age or older. The average household size was 2.67 and the average family size was 3.06.

In the town, the population was spread out, with 26.1% under the age of 18, 6.4% from 18 to 24, 31.1% from 25 to 44, 27.4% from 45 to 64, and 9.0% who were 65 years of age or older. The median age was 38 years. For every 100 females, there were 105.1 males. For every 100 females age 18 and over, there were 107.5 males.

The median income for a household in the town was $41,974, and the median income for a family was $45,294. Males had a median income of $33,313 versus $25,000 for females. The per capita income for the town was $18,802. About 6.7% of families and 8.8% of the population were below the poverty line, including 13.9% of those under age 18 and 3.2% of those age 65 or over.

== Communities and locations in Arkwright ==
- Arkwright – The hamlet of Arkwright, located on the west side of the town at the Route 83 County Road 79 junction
- Black Corners – A hamlet on Route 83 east of Arkwright
- Canadaway State Wildlife Management Area – A conservation area in the south part of the town
- Chicken Tavern – A location on Route 83 between Arkwright and Black Corners
- Cowdens Corners – A hamlet on Route 83 in the northwest corner of the town
- Griswold – A hamlet in the south part of the town at the junction of County Roads 72 and 79
- Towns Corners – A location near the east town line
- West Mud Lake – A small lake on the eastern town line near Route 83
