= Nashville, New York =

Nashville, New York may refer to:

- Nashville, a hamlet in Hanover, Chautauqua County, New York
- Nashville, a hamlet in Wheatfield, Niagara County, New York
