= Sheridan, New York =

- Town
- Location within Chautauqua County and New York state

- Location within New York Location within the United States
- Coordinates: 42°29′3″N 79°14′53″W
- Country: United States
- State: New York
- County: Chautauqua

Government
  - Type: Town Council
  - Town Supervisor: John Walker II (R)
  - Town Council: Members' List: • Richard Feinen (R); • Colleen M. Yerico (R); • Craig Sutton (R); • Thomas Wik (R)

Area
  - Total: 37.30 sq mi (96.61 km^{2})
  - Land: 37.25 sq mi (96.48 km^{2})
  - Water: 0.050 sq mi (0.13 km^{2})
- Elevation: 761 ft (232 m)

Population (2020)
  - Total: 2,563
  - Estimate (2021): 2,544
  - Density: 69.1/sq mi (26.67/km^{2})
- Time zone: UTC-5 (Eastern (EST))
  - Summer (DST): UTC-4 (EDT)
- ZIP Codes: 14135 (Sheridan); 14048 (Dunkirk); 14062 (Forestville); 14063 (Fredonia); 14136 (Silver Creek)
- Area code: 716
- FIPS code: 36-013-66916
- GNIS feature ID: 0979491
- Website: www.sheridanny.org

Sheridan is a town in Chautauqua County, New York, United States. The population was 2,563 at the 2020 census. The town is on the county's northern border, east of Dunkirk.

== History ==
The area was first settled c. 1804 and town of Sheridan was founded in 1827 from parts of the towns of Hanover and Pomfret.

== Geography ==
According to the United States Census Bureau, Sheridan has a total area of 37.3 square miles (96.6 km^{2}), of which 37.3 square miles (96.5 km^{2}) is land and 0.04 square miles (0.1 km^{2}), or 0.14%, is water.

The town is on the south shore of Lake Erie.

The New York State Thruway (Interstate 90) and US 20 pass across the town.

=== Adjacent towns and areas ===
(Clockwise)

- Lake Erie
- Hanover
- Arkwright
- Pomfret; Dunkirk

== Demographics ==
Historical population
Census	Pop.	Note	%±
1830	1,666		—
1840	1,883		13.0%
1850	2,173		15.4%
1860	1,716		−21.0%
1870	1,686		−1.7%
1880	1,551		−8.0%
1890	1,511		−2.6%
1900	1,633		8.1%
1910	1,888		15.6%
1920	1,887		−0.1%
1930	2,035		7.8%
1940	1,826		−10.3%
1950	2,037		11.6%
1960	2,539		24.6%
1970	2,527		−0.5%
1980	2,659		5.2%
1990	2,582		−2.9%
2000	2,838		9.9%
2010	2,673		−5.8%
2020	2,563		−4.1%
2021 (est.)	2,544		−0.7%
U.S. Decennial Census

As of the census of 2000, there were 2,838 people, 994 households, and 737 families residing in the town. The population density was 76.1 inhabitants per square mile (29.4/km^{2}). There were 1,079 housing units at an average density of 28.9 per square mile (11.2/km^{2}). The racial makeup of the town was 96.34% White, 0.63% African American, 0.42% Native American, 0.21% Asian, 0.07% Pacific Islander, 1.02% from other races, and 1.30% from two or more races. Hispanic or Latino of any race were 2.43% of the population.

There were 994 households, out of which 33.0% had children under the age of 18 living with them, 61.8% were married couples living together, 8.5% had a female householder with no husband present, and 25.8% were non-families. 21.0% of all households were made up of individuals, and 10.3% had someone living alone who was 65 years of age or older. The average household size was 2.60 and the average family size was 3.02.

In the town, the population was spread out, with 22.3% under the age of 18, 5.7% from 18 to 24, 24.8% from 25 to 44, 25.3% from 45 to 64, and 21.9% who were 65 years of age or older. The median age was 43 years. For every 100 females, there were 83.1 males. For every 100 females age 18 and over, there were 81.9 males.

The median income for a household in the town was $40,347, and the median income for a family was $46,250. Males had a median income of $34,052 versus $26,146 for females. The per capita income for the town was $19,081. About 5.0% of families and 7.1% of the population were below the poverty line, including 8.3% of those under age 18 and 7.7% of those age 65 or over.

== Education ==
Sheridan is split among the following school districts: Silver Creek, Forestville, Dunkirk City Schools, and Fredonia.

== Communities and locations in Sheridan ==
- Center Corners – A hamlet on the lake shore, located on Route 5.
- Chautauqua County/Dunkirk Airport (DKK) – A general aviation airport in the western part of town.
- Cook Corners – A hamlet southwest of Sheridan village on Route 20.
- Hawkins Corner – A location east of Sheridan village on Route 84.
- Sheridan – The hamlet of Sheridan, located on Route 20 south of the New York State Thruway.

== Law enforcement, fire, and EMS ==
Sheridan is served by an independent volunteer fire department run by a board of fire commissioners. Although Sheridan Fire does not have its own transport ambulance, it contracts with Alstar Ambulance for EMS transport. When Alstar is not available, mutual aid is requested from Fredonia, Silver Creek, or Forestville. Law enforcement is provided by the New York State Police and Chautauqua County Sheriff's Office.

== Notable people ==
- Bill Brace, Former NFL player for the Buffalo All-Americans
- John Cranston, All-American college football player
- Daniel A. Reed, former US congressman and football player
- Cyrus Remington, Wisconsin State Assemblyman and jurist
