= Villenova, New York =

- Town
- Location in Chautauqua County and New York state

- Location within New York Location within the United States
- Coordinates: 42°23′N 79°7′W
- Country: United States
- State: New York
- County: Chautauqua

Government
  - Type: Town Council
  - Town Supervisor: Yvonne M. Park (R)
  - Town Council: Members' List: • Susan Ecker-Newton (R); • Judith L. Rose (R); • Melvin Conklin (R); • Donald L. Chase (R)

Area
  - Total: 36.20 sq mi (93.77 km^{2})
  - Land: 36.09 sq mi (93.48 km^{2})
  - Water: 0.11 sq mi (0.29 km^{2})
- Elevation: 1,572 ft (479 m)

Population (2020)
  - Total: 1,053
  - Estimate (2021): 1,048
  - Density: 29.7/sq mi (11.45/km^{2})
- Time zone: UTC-5 (Eastern (EST))
  - Summer (DST): UTC-4 (EDT)
- ZIP Codes: 14062 (Forestville); 14138 (South Dayton); 14723 (Cherry Creek)
- FIPS code: 36-013-77530
- GNIS feature ID: 0979587
- Website: www.villenovany.org

Villenova is a town in Chautauqua County, New York, United States. The population was 1,053 at the 2020 census. The town is on the eastern border of the county and is southeast of Dunkirk.

== History ==
The area that would become Villenova was first settled circa 1809. The town of Villenova was formed from part of the town of Hanover in 1823.

== Geography ==
According to the United States Census Bureau, Villenova has a total area of 36.2 square miles (93.8 km^{2}), of which 36.1 square miles (93.5 km^{2}) is land and 0.12 square miles (0.3 km^{2}), or 0.31%, is water.

New York State Route 83 intersects New York State Route 322 by Balcom Corners.

=== Adjacent towns and areas ===
The east town line is shared with the town of Dayton in Cattaraugus County, and the town of Arkwright is on the west. To the north is the town of Hanover, and the town of Cherry Creek is to the south.

== Demographics ==
Historical population
| Census | Pop. | Note | %± |
|---|---|---|---|
| 1830 | 1,126 | | — |
| 1840 | 1,655 | | 47.0% |
| 1850 | 1,536 | | −7.2% |
| 1860 | 1,514 | | −1.4% |
| 1870 | 1,401 | | −7.5% |
| 1880 | 1,446 | | 3.2% |
| 1890 | 1,242 | | −14.1% |
| 1900 | 1,206 | | −2.9% |
| 1910 | 1,140 | | −5.5% |
| 1920 | 961 | | −15.7% |
| 1930 | 917 | | −4.6% |
| 1940 | 877 | | −4.4% |
| 1950 | 888 | | 1.3% |
| 1960 | 969 | | 9.1% |
| 1970 | 970 | | 0.1% |
| 1980 | 1,061 | | 9.4% |
| 1990 | 1,065 | | 0.4% |
| 2000 | 1,121 | | 5.3% |
| 2010 | 1,110 | | −1.0% |
| 2020 | 1,053 | | −5.1% |
| 2021 (est.) | 1,048 | | −0.5% |
U.S. Decennial Census

As of the census of 2000, there were 1,121 people, 415 households, and 319 families residing in the town. The population density was 31.0 inhabitants per square mile (12.0/km^{2}). There were 489 housing units at an average density of 13.5 per square mile (5.2/km^{2}). The racial makeup of the town was 97.86% White, 0.18% African American, 0.62% Native American, 0.36% Asian, 0.09% Pacific Islander, 0.54% from other races, and 0.36% from two or more races. Hispanic or Latino of any race were 1.07% of the population.

There were 415 households, out of which 35.7% had children under the age of 18 living with them, 62.9% were married couples living together, 8.4% had a female householder with no husband present, and 23.1% were non-families. 19.0% of all households were made up of individuals, and 8.0% had someone living alone who was 65 years of age or older. The average household size was 2.70 and the average family size was 3.05.

In the town, the population was spread out, with 29.1% under the age of 18, 6.3% from 18 to 24, 27.9% from 25 to 44, 25.4% from 45 to 64, and 11.2% who were 65 years of age or older. The median age was 37 years. For every 100 females, there were 100.5 males. For every 100 females age 18 and over, there were 99.2 males.

The median income for a household in the town was $35,208, and the median income for a family was $39,125. Males had a median income of $30,833 versus $22,083 for females. The per capita income for the town was $14,240. About 10.0% of families and 11.8% of the population were below the poverty line, including 14.7% of those under age 18 and 11.4% of those age 65 or over.

== Communities and locations in Villenova ==
- Balcom – A hamlet on State Route 83.
- Balcom Corners – A hamlet east of Balcom at the junction of Routes 83 and 322.
- East Mud Lake – A small lake north of Wango.
- Hamlet – A hamlet on Route 83 in the southwest part of the town and west of Balcom hamlet.
- Skunks Corners – A hamlet at the east town line, east of Balcom hamlet.
- Town Corners – A location in the southwest corner of the town.
- Wango – A hamlet in the northern part of the town.
- West Branch Conewango Creek – A small stream in the eastern part of the town. Conewango Creek is a tributary of the Allegheny River in Pennsylvania.
- West Mud Lake – A small lake on the western town line near Route 83.
- Wrights Corners – A location north of Balcom hamlet.

== Notable people ==
- Albert Cole Hopkins, U.S. Congressman from Pennsylvania, born in Villenova.
- Jarvis T. Wright (1830-1886), Wisconsin businessman and state legislator, was born in Villenova.
- Current New York State Republican Committee chairman Nick Langworthy lived in or near Villenova during high school.
