= Ellington, New York =

- Town
- Nickname: "A Grand Old Town"
- Location within Chautauqua County and New York state

- Location within New York Location within the United States
- Coordinates: 42°13′17″N 79°6′40″W
- Country: United States
- State: New York
- County: Chautauqua

Government
  - Type: Town Council
  - Town Supervisor: Karen Bifaro(D)(Formerly Laura M. Cronk)(R)
  - Town Council: Members' List: • Kevin Colburn (R); • Bradley Griffith (R); • Barbara Beightol (D); • David Brainard (R)

Area
  - Total: 36.56 sq mi (94.69 km^{2})
  - Land: 36.54 sq mi (94.65 km^{2})
  - Water: 0.015 sq mi (0.04 km^{2})
- Elevation: 1,410 ft (430 m)

Population (2020)
  - Total: 1,493
  - Estimate (2021): 1,500
  - Density: 43.1/sq mi (16.63/km^{2})
- Time zone: UTC-5 (Eastern (EST))
  - Summer (DST): UTC-4 (EDT)
- ZIP Codes: 14732 (Ellington); 14740 (Gerry); 14747 (Kennedy); 14723 (Cherry Creek); 14726 (Conewango Valley); 14733 (Falconer); 14782 (Sinclairville)
- Area code: 716
- FIPS code: 36-013-24053
- GNIS feature ID: 0978935
- Website: www.ellingtonny.org

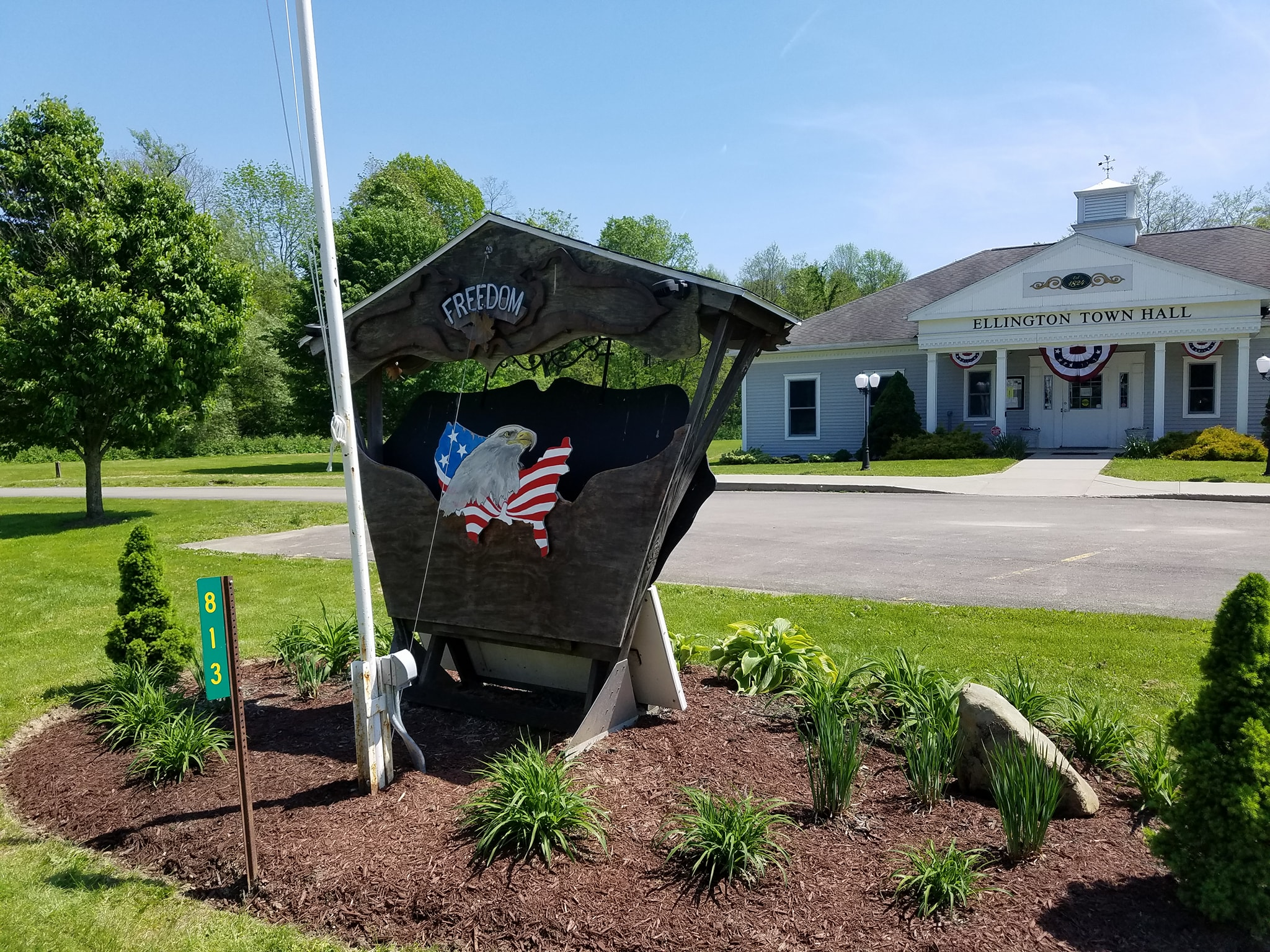

Ellington is a town in Chautauqua County, New York, United States. The population was 1,493 at the 2020 census.

== History ==
The town of Ellington was formed on April 1, 1824, from the town of Gerry, and Cherry Creek was taken off on May 4, 1829. The first real settlement in the area was towards the northeast part of the town. The first settler to this area was Joshua Bentley, who purchased part of lot 7 in 1814, and part of lot 6 in 1815. Once the town was officially formed in 1824, the first town meeting was held on March 1, 1825, at the house of Lucretia French, in the north part of town. The first religious services were held at the house of James Bates in 1817 by Rev. Daniel Hadley.

In Ellington's early years there were a few saw-mills in the town, in which most of the townsfolk that didn't have other jobs worked. Most notably was the saw-mill at the dead-end of the aptly named Mill St, which was originally named Willow St. It is notable because it was operational from the 1800s to the early 2000s. Ellington also had a high school on Main Street at one point, built in 1910 and constructed directly in front of the former school house which was built in 1852. The school was known as The Ellington Academy, and operated as a high school until 1948. The building is now a private residence. The original School House built in 1852 was known as "The Box of Knowledge" and reportedly started as a teachers college. During Prohibition bootlegging was common all over the country. Reportedly there were moonshine stills hidden in an old root cellar on 28th Creek Rd known as "The Hide Out" and "Hole in the Wall", however it is unknown if this is true or not.

The Floods of Ellington

On September 8, 1865, a storm caused Twenty-eighth Creek, which runs through the southern part of the town, to turn into a terrifying river of logs and wreckage. Homes, stores, the Hotel, and the Baptist Church were all reportedly destroyed or washed away. On August 2, 1979, another terrible flood from Twenty-eighth Creek ravaged the town. One resident of 28th Creek Rd is reported as yelling, "Move out as many people as you can! There's a wall of water headed towards Ellington!". The flood destroyed a trailer park above the town before sending flood waters through the town proper. The Baptist Church sustained damage as well as the former town hall and around 40 homes. Town records washed out of the town hall were recovered a third of a mile away. The damage to the entire town was determined to be around one million dollars. On September 14, 1979, there was another flood although this one was much less damaging than the one just a month prior in August.

== Geography ==
Ellington is located on the eastern edge of Chautauqua County, bordered by Cattaraugus County to the east. It is northeast of Jamestown, the largest city in Chautauqua County. According to the United States Census Bureau, Ellington has a total area of 36.6 square miles (94.7 km^{2}), of which 0.015 square miles (0.04 km^{2}), or 0.04%, is water.

U.S. Route 62 passes east-to-south through the town, and New York State Route 83 passes through the northeast of the town parallel to Conewango Creek, a tributary of the Allegheny River.

=== Adjacent towns and areas ===
Ellington is south of the town of Cherry Creek and north of the town of Poland. To the west is the town of Gerry. On the east is the town of Conewango in Cattaraugus County.

== Demographics ==
Historical population
Census	Pop.	Note	%±
1830	1,279		—
1840	1,725		34.9%
1850	2,001		16.0%
1860	1,937		−3.2%
1870	1,556		−19.7%
1880	1,602		3.0%
1890	1,430		−10.7%
1900	1,330		−7.0%
1910	1,235		−7.1%
1920	1,061		−14.1%
1930	1,079		1.7%
1940	1,073		−0.6%
1950	1,142		6.4%
1960	1,314		15.1%
1970	1,384		5.3%
1980	1,690		22.1%
1990	1,615		−4.4%
2000	1,639		1.5%
2010	1,643		0.2%
2020	1,493		−9.1%
2021 (est.)	1,500		0.5%
U.S. Decennial Census

As of the census of 2000, there were 1,639 people, 568 households, and 440 families residing in the town. The population density was 44.8 inhabitants per square mile (17.3/km^{2}). There were 636 housing units at an average density of 17.4 per square mile (6.7/km^{2}). The racial makeup of the town was 98.35% White, 0.18% African American, 0.67% Native American, 0.12% Asian, 0.06% from other races, and 0.61% from two or more races. Hispanic or Latino of any race were 0.61% of the population.

There were 568 households, out of which 36.3% had children under the age of 18 living with them, 66.9% were married couples living together, 6.9% had a female householder with no husband present, and 22.5% were non-families. 16.4% of all households were made up of individuals, and 7.2% had someone living alone who was 65 years of age or older. The average household size was 2.88 and the average family size was 3.25.

In the town, the population was spread out, with 28.4% under the age of 18, 7.7% from 18 to 24, 29.5% from 25 to 44, 23.8% from 45 to 64, and 10.6% who were 65 years of age or older. The median age was 37 years. For every 100 females, there were 100.9 males. For every 100 females age 18 and over, there were 102.9 males.

The median income for a household in the town was $36,300, and the median income for a family was $41,058. Males had a median income of $28,000 versus $21,842 for females. The per capita income for the town was $15,790. About 9.3% of families and 12.2% of the population were below the poverty line, including 17.1% of those under age 18 and 12.7% of those age 65 or over.

== Ellington Town Picnic ==
Every year on the first Friday, Saturday, and Sunday of August, the town hosts its "Ellington Town Picnic". The picnic has activities such as a woodcutting contest, cake contest and auction, pet show contest, baby contest, horseshoe throwing contest, BBQ, square dance and music, and on Saturday at 10:00 PM the town has a fireworks show near the north east side of the town park on Saturday night of the picnic at 10:00 PM.

Town Picnic History: Arriving to the town square by horse and buggy with a dish to pass, the Ellington community gathered for the first official Town Picnic in 1905. As electricity came to Ellington the event expanded from a one day get-together to the three day event it is now. For a few years early on political speakers were asked to orate at the event, but this was quickly dropped. This picnic has been going year after year except during the World Wars since 1912 to present day making it the oldest small town picnic in America.

== Notable people ==
- William Parment, former New York State Assemblyman
- Bill Rexford, 1950 Nascar Grand National Series Champion
- James Strang, Religious leader and self-proclaimed "King of the United States"

== Communities and locations in Ellington ==
- Bates – A hamlet in the northwest corner of the town on County Routes 64 and 66
- Clear Creek – A hamlet on the eastern town line, south of Conewango Valley on NY Route 83
- Clear Creek – A tributary of Conewango Creek that flows eastward past the community of Clear Creek. It is part of the Allegheny River watershed
- Conewango Valley – A hamlet on the eastern town line on Route 83 at its junction with U.S. Route 62. The post office bearing the "Conewango Valley" name is actually in the town of Conewango, New York on the other side of the Cattaraugus County line; the Conewango and Conewango Valley post offices had merged in 1964, located in Conewango but keeping the Conewango Valley name
- Ellington – The hamlet of Ellington in the town's center at the junction of County Roads 50 (West Main Street) and 66 (Thornton Road) and US Route 62
- Gates Corners – A location on the north town line
- Kings School Corner – A location by the north town line on Route 83
- Waterboro – A hamlet by the southeast part of the town
- No-God Hollow – A facetious name for the area along Thornton Road in which an atheist once lived long ago
