= Hanover, New York =

- Town
- Location within Chautauqua County and New York state

- Location within New York Location within the United States
- Coordinates: 42°31′N 79°9′W
- Country: United States
- State: New York
- County: Chautauqua

Government
  - Type: Town Council
  - Town Supervisor: Todd Johnson
  - Town Council: Members' List: • Louis Pelletter (R); • Wayne L. Ashley (C); • Bernard Feldmann (I); • Edward Schintzius (D)

Area
  - Total: 49.46 sq mi (128.10 km^{2})
  - Land: 49.18 sq mi (127.37 km^{2})
  - Water: 0.28 sq mi (0.73 km^{2})
- Elevation: 950 ft (290 m)

Population (2020)
  - Total: 6,944
  - Estimate (2021): 6,893
  - Density: 139.2/sq mi (53.73/km^{2})
- Time zone: UTC-5 (Eastern (EST))
  - Summer (DST): UTC-4 (EDT)
- ZIP Codes: 14062 (Forestville); 14136 (Silver Creek); 14081 (Irving); 14138 (South Dayton)
- FIPS code: 36-013-32050
- GNIS feature ID: 0979045
- Website: hanoverny.gov

Hanover is a town in Chautauqua County, New York, United States. The population was 6,893 at the 2020 census. The town lies in the northeast corner of Chautauqua County.

== History ==
The first settler arrived in 1796. The town of Hanover was formed in 1812 from part of the town of Pomfret. The size of Hanover was reduced later to form the new towns of Villenova (1823) and Sheridan (1827).

== Notable people ==
- Jonathan D. Davis, former Michigan state senator
- Mary Smith Lockwood, co-founder of Daughters of the American Revolution

== Geography ==
According to the United States Census Bureau, the town has a total area of 49.5 square miles (128.1 km^{2}), of which 49.2 square miles (127.4 km^{2}) is land and 0.27 square miles (0.7 km^{2}), or 0.57%, is water.

The New York State Thruway (Interstate 90), US 20 and NY 5 pass through the north part of the town. New York State Route 39 crosses the center of the town.

=== Adjacent towns and areas ===
On the north, the town borders Lake Erie, and on the northeast, Cattaraugus Creek, which is the boundary of the Cattaraugus Reservation in Erie County. The east town line borders the town of Perrysburg and the portion of the Cattaraugus Reservation in Cattaraugus County. The south town line is shared with Villenova and Arkwright, and the west town line is shared with the town of Sheridan.

== Demographics ==
Historical population
Census	Pop.	Note	%±
1820	2,217		—
1830	2,614		17.9%
1840	3,998		52.9%
1850	5,144		28.7%
1860	4,254		−17.3%
1870	4,037		−5.1%
1880	4,221		4.6%
1890	4,616		9.4%
1900	4,747		2.8%
1910	5,601		18.0%
1920	5,977		6.7%
1930	5,993		0.3%
1940	5,846		−2.5%
1950	6,375		9.0%
1960	7,301		14.5%
1970	7,829		7.2%
1980	7,876		0.6%
1990	7,380		−6.3%
2000	7,638		3.5%
2010	7,127		−6.7%
2020	6,944		−2.6%
2021 (est.)	6,893		−0.7%
U.S. Decennial Census

As of the census of 2000, there were 7,638 people, 2,975 households, and 2,040 families residing in the town. The population density was 154.9 inhabitants per square mile (59.8/km^{2}). There were 3,501 housing units at an average density of 71.0 per square mile (27.4/km^{2}). The racial makeup of the town was 96.82% White, 0.48% African American, 0.90% Native American, 0.12% Asian, 0.05% Pacific Islander, 0.76% from other races, and 0.86% from two or more races. Hispanic or Latino of any race were 1.70% of the population.

There were 2,975 households, out of which 31.8% had children under the age of 18 living with them, 53.8% were married couples living together, 10.7% had a female householder with no husband present, and 31.4% were non-families. 26.1% of all households were made up of individuals, and 11.9% had someone living alone who was 65 years of age or older. The average household size was 2.50 and the average family size was 2.99.

In the town, the population was spread out, with 25.4% under the age of 18, 6.2% from 18 to 24, 27.6% from 25 to 44, 24.3% from 45 to 64, and 16.4% who were 65 years of age or older. The median age was 39 years. For every 100 females, there were 95.2 males. For every 100 females age 18 and over, there were 91.2 males.

The median income for a household in the town was $37,567, and the median income for a family was $44,057. Males had a median income of $38,034 versus $22,754 for females. The per capita income for the town was $17,654. About 6.3% of families and 10.6% of the population were below the poverty line, including 16.3% of those under age 18 and 5.8% of those age 65 or over.

== Communities and locations in Hanover ==
- Balltown – A hamlet in the southeast part of the town, east of Smiths Mills.
- Cattaraugus Reservation – A reservation the Seneca tribe borders the northeast part of the town.
- Dennisons Corners – A location north of Keaches Corners.
- Forestville – The hamlet of Forestville, near the west town line and in the southwest part of the town on NY-39, formerly a village.
- Hanford Bay – A lakeside hamlet in the northeast part of the town, west of Irving.
- Hanover Center – A hamlet southeast of Silver Creek on County Roads 89 and 93.
- Irving – A hamlet on NY-5 and US 20 on the northeast town line. The community was first called "Cattaraugus" and later "Acasto" and part of the community was called "La Grange" after the Gilbert du Motier, Marquis de Lafayette who lived at La Grange in France. The village is adjacent to Cattaraugus Creek.
- Keaches Corners – A hamlet north of Forestville on County Road 85.
- Nashville – A hamlet on Route 39 in the southeast corner of the town. The hamlet was named after Deacon Silas Nash, a local settler.
- Parcells Corners – A hamlet in the southeast part of town on Route 39 and County Road 93.
- Silver Creek – The village of Silver Creek, in the northeast corner of the town on US Route 20 and NY Route 5.
- Smith's Mills – A hamlet in the eastern part of the town on County Road 93. The hamlet was originally the home of Rodney Smith.
- Sunset Bay – A lakeside hamlet (and census-designated place) in the northeast part of the town on County Road 95.

== Law enforcement, fire protection and EMS ==
Law enforcement in the town of Hanover is provided by the Chautauqua County Sheriff's Office and the New York State Police. The presiding justices for the town are Philip Hall and James McGowan. Court is held every Monday at 10 A.M. and every Thursday at 7 P.M.

Fire protection for the town of Hanover is supplied by the following fire departments:

Silver Creek Volunteer Fire Department, with district lines from the Sheridan/Silver Creek line on NY 5 to the west, and the Sheridan/Hanover lines with US 20 and East Middle Road. It also borders Hanover Hose Co. #1, better known as Hanover Center, at Bennett State Road at Stebbins Road as well as Sunset Bay at NY 5/US 20 at Hanford Road.

Irving Volunteer Fire Department, with district lines that run east to the county line and west to Seneca Road on the western side of the road. Its borders also run in a zig zag pattern to the south on Buffalo Road south of the New York State Thruway with the county's border with the Cattaraugus Indian Reservation. Irving also handles all calls on the Thruway in a contract between the Thruway Authority, Irving Volunteer Fire, Silver Creek EMS, Silver Creek Volunteer Fire, Alstar, and the New York State Police.

Sunset Bay Volunteer Fire Company, an independent fire company in the town that handles all calls within Sunset Bay and outside it on NY 5/US 20 from east of Hanford Road to the western side of Seneca Road. It borders the lines of Irving, Hanover Center, and Silver Creek to the west, east, and south.

Hanover Hose Company #1 (Hanover Center), which started as Silver Creek Hose Co. #2 before separating from the Silver Creek Fire Department in 1959. Since that time it has remained an independent fire company that contracts with the town. It is bordered by Silver Creek to the north, Sunset Bay to the northeast, Irving to the east, Forestville to the southwest, and South Dayton to the south. It has the largest coverage in the town for fire protection.

Forestville Volunteer Fire Department, the fire department for the village of Forestville. It provides EMS protection for the town of Hanover south of King Road in the Hanover Center Fire District. It also provides fire and EMS protection in the towns of Villenova and Arkwright.

Silver Creek EMS, an independent squad run by the Silver Creek Fire Department and village of Silver Creek. The squad provides EMS protection to town residents north of King Road as well per contract with the NYS Thruway Authority. It is a BLS service, with ALS provided by Alstar Ambulance in Dunkirk.

All are dispatched by the Chautauqua County Sheriff's Dispatch Center in Mayville under the FCC call sign KEB 909.

== Bibliography ==
- Young, Andrew White (1875). History of Chautauqua County, New York : from its first settlement to the present time : with numerous biographical and family sketches. Buffalo, New York: Printing House of Matthews & Warren.
