= Laona, New York =

Hamlet in New York, United States

Coordinates: 42°25′18″N 79°18′20″W

Laona is a hamlet in Chautauqua County, New York, United States, near the village of Fredonia. It is part of the town of Pomfret and New York State Route 60 passes through the hamlet. Laona is at an elevation of 850 feet (260 m) above sea level.

Laona has been an area of importance to Spiritualist groups since the mid-19th century. Spiritualism began there in the winter of 1844-45 and over the next several years, a number of mediums converged there. The Laona Free Association organized soon after 1850 and the First Spiritualist Society of Laona was formed in 1855.

The American composer Alan Hovhaness visited Laona and composed two works inspired by the hamlet: Laona (for piano) and Dawn at Laona, Op. 153 (cantata for low voice and piano).

== See also ==
- Lily Dale, New York
