= Frank L. Bacon =

American politician (1841–1917)

Member of the Wisconsin State Assembly
- In office 1895

Personal details
- Born: Frank Leander Bacon; September 6, 1841 Dayton, New York, U.S.
- Died: December 8, 1917 (aged 76) Waupun, Wisconsin, U.S.
- Party: Republican
- Occupation: Politician, farmer, businessman

Frank Leander Bacon (September 6, 1841 – December 8, 1917) was an American farmer, businessman, and politician.

Born in Dayton, New York, Bacon and his wife moved to Wisconsin and settled in the Town of Waupun, Fond du Lac County, Wisconsin in 1865. Bacon owned a farm and had a milling business and a cheese and butter factory. Bacon served as chairman of the Town of Waupun and was a Republican. In 1895, Bacon served in the Wisconsin State Assembly. In 1902, Bacon retired and moved into the City of Waupun, Wisconsin where he died in 1917.
