= Hamlet, New York =

Hamlet in New York, United States

Coordinates: 42°22′11″N 79°08′06″W

Hamlet is a hamlet located in the Town of Villenova in Chautauqua County, New York, United States. It is at an elevation of 1398 ft (426 m) above sea level.

Hamlet was a historic railroad junction. The community is in the south part of the town, located on Route 83 at the junction of South Hill and North Hill Roads. A branch of the Conewango Creek passes north of the community.

== See also ==
- Reduplication
