= Cyrus Remington =

American politician

Cyrus C. Remington (November 10, 1824 – October 12, 1878) was an American politician and jurist.

Born in Sheridan, New York, Remington and his family moved to Wisconsin Territory in 1840 and settled near Waukesha, Wisconsin Territory. He read law under Wisconsin Governor Alexander Randall and at Finch & Lynde Law Firm in Milwaukee, Wisconsin Territory. In 1847, Remington was admitted to the Wisconsin Bar and practiced law in Baraboo, Wisconsin. He served in the Wisconsin Assembly in 1854. From 1870 to 1873, Remington served as county judge of Sauk County, Wisconsin. He died in Baraboo, Wisconsin.
