= Dayton, New York =

- Town
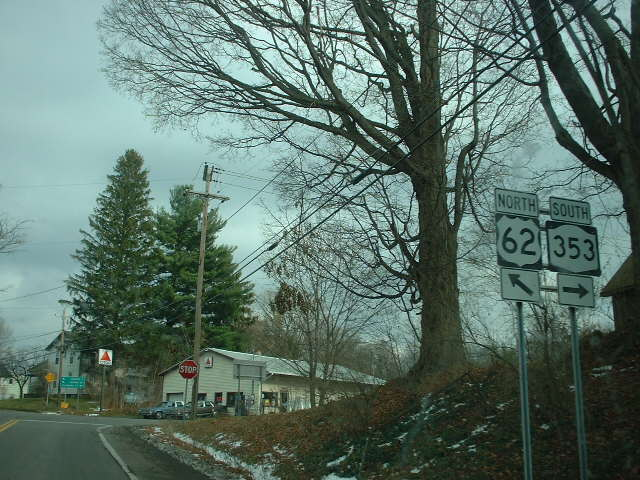
- The hamlet of Dayton, approaching from the southwest

- Location within New York Location within the United States
- Coordinates: 42°24′N 79°0′W
- Country: United States
- State: New York
- County: Cattaraugus

Government
  - Type: Town Council
  - Town Supervisor: Angeline M. Mardino-Miller (R)
  - Town Council: Members' List: • Edward Lulas (R); • Joseph Shull (R); • Kenneth C. Volk (R); • Diana Clabeaux ()

Area
  - Total: 36.25 sq mi (93.88 km^{2})
  - Land: 35.63 sq mi (92.28 km^{2})
  - Water: 0.62 sq mi (1.60 km^{2})
- Elevation: 1,309 ft (399 m)

Population (2020)
  - Total: 1,689
  - Estimate (2021): 1,676
  - Density: 51/sq mi (19.8/km^{2})
- Time zone: UTC-5 (Eastern (EST))
  - Summer (DST): UTC-4 (EDT)
- ZIP Codes: 14041 (Dayton); 14138 (South Dayton); 14070 (Gowanda); 14129 (Perrysburg); 14719 (Cattaraugus)
- Area code: 716
- FIPS code: 36-009-19840
- GNIS feature ID: 0978889
- Website: www.townofdaytonny.gov

Dayton is a town in Cattaraugus County, New York, United States. The population was 1,689 at the 2020 census. The town is on the western border of Cattaraugus County.

== History ==
The first settlers arrived circa 1810, believing they were settling in Chautauqua County. The Town of Dayton was founded in 1835, formed from the town of Perrysburg.

== Geography ==
According to the United States Census Bureau, the town of Dayton has a total area of 36.1 square miles (93.6 km^{2}), of which 35.5 square miles (92.0 km^{2}) is land and 0.62 square miles (1.6 km^{2}), or 1.71%, is water.

Dayton is bordered by the town of Perrysburg to the north and the town of Persia to the east. The town of Leon is to the south, and Dayton's west town line is the border of the town of Villenova in Chautauqua County.

New York State Route 353 ends in the town; U.S. Route 62 passes through the town.

== Demographics ==
Historical population
Census	Pop.	Note	%±
1840	946		—
1850	1,448		53.1%
1860	1,294		−10.6%
1870	1,267		−2.1%
1880	1,705		34.6%
1890	1,735		1.8%
1900	1,691		−2.5%
1910	1,710		1.1%
1920	1,712		0.1%
1930	1,602		−6.4%
1940	1,725		7.7%
1950	1,873		8.6%
1960	1,931		3.1%
1970	2,004		3.8%
1980	1,981		−1.1%
1990	1,915		−3.3%
2000	1,945		1.6%
2010	1,886		−3.0%
2020	1,689		−10.4%
2021 (est.)	1,676		−0.8%
U.S. Decennial Census

As of the census of 2000, there were 1,945 people, 749 households, and 524 families residing in the town. The population density was 54.4 inhabitants per square mile (21.0/km^{2}). There were 836 housing units at an average density of 23.4 per square mile (9.0/km^{2}). The racial makeup of the town was 97.17% White, 0.41% African American, 1.13% Native American, 0.05% Asian, 0.26% from other races, and 0.98% from two or more races. Hispanic or Latino of any race were 0.77% of the population.

There were 749 households, out of which 33.1% had children under the age of 18 living with them, 52.1% were married couples living together, 13.5% had a female householder with no husband present, and 30.0% were non-families. 24.3% of all households were made up of individuals, and 10.7% had someone living alone who was 65 years of age or older. The average household size was 2.59 and the average family size was 3.04.

In the town, the population was spread out, with 28.9% under the age of 18, 6.8% from 18 to 24, 27.8% from 25 to 44, 23.2% from 45 to 64, and 13.3% who were 65 years of age or older. The median age was 36 years. For every 100 females, there were 98.3 males. For every 100 females age 18 and over, there were 92.6 males.

The median income for a household in the town was $31,607, and the median income for a family was $37,917. Males had a median income of $28,485 versus $24,830 for females. The per capita income for the town was $15,355. About 9.1% of families and 12.8% of the population were below the poverty line, including 13.2% of those under age 18 and 4.7% of those age 65 or over.

== Communities and locations in the Town of Dayton ==
- Conewango Creek – A stream in the western part of the town that flows into Chautauqua County and Pennsylvania.
- Cottage – A hamlet by the northwest corner of the town on County Road 2. Historically known as West Dayton.
- Dayton – The hamlet of Dayton, formerly a station on the Erie Railroad, is on U.S. Route 62 in the northeast corner of the town.
- Dexter Corners – A location east of South Dayton at the junction of US Route 62 and NY Route 353.
- East Leon – A hamlet by the south town line on County Road 5, south of Wesley. Historically known as Sociality.
- Judd Corners – A hamlet by the eastern town line on NY Route 353.
- Markhams – A hamlet by the northeast corner of the town, southwest of Dayton village on US Route 62.
- Meyers Corners – A hamlet by the south town line on US Route 62.
- Skunks Corners – A location on the western town line, west of South Dayton.
- South Dayton – The village of South Dayton is located in the southwest corner of the town.
- South Dayton Airport – A small airport east of South Dayton.
- Wesley – A hamlet by the eastern town line on NY Route 353.

== Notable people ==
- Norman M. Allen, former New York state senator
- Frank L. Bacon, Wisconsin State Assemblyman, businessman, and farmer
