= Jonathan D. Davis =

American politician

Member of the Michigan Senate from the 1st district
- In office November 2, 1835 – December 31, 1837
- Preceded by: Legislature established

Personal details
- Born: June 29, 1795 Hanover, New York
- Died: May 15, 1853 (aged 57) Albion, Michigan
- Party: Democratic

Jonathan D. Davis (June 29, 1795 – May 15, 1853) was an American medical doctor and politician. He served in the Michigan Senate in the early years of Michigan's statehood.

== Biography ==
Jonathan Davis was born in Hanover, New York, on June 29, 1795. He worked as a store clerk and teacher to pay for his own academic and medical education.

He moved to Plymouth, Michigan, in 1828, purchased land, and began a career as a doctor and farmer. He served as the clerk of Plymouth Township in 1828 and 1834. He was also a justice of the peace in 1828 and 1831, and commissioned as a captain in the territorial militia in 1829. He was briefly commissioned twice more, once during the Black Hawk War as a major in 1832, and again during the Toledo War when he served in September 1835 as a colonel, commanding the 1st Regiment, 2nd Brigade, 1st Division (Washtenaw County).

Davis served as a territorial judge and was later elected as a delegate to the state constitutional convention in 1835, then as a Democrat to the Michigan Senate in the first election under the new constitution, and served from 1835 to 1837. He was the president pro tempore of the senate in 1837.

He moved to Jackson, Michigan, in 1842, and worked as the prison physician. He later moved to Albion, Michigan, where he died on May 15, 1853.

Davis was married; his wife, Betsy, died in Jackson on May 19, 1880.
