= Cherry Creek, New York =

- Town
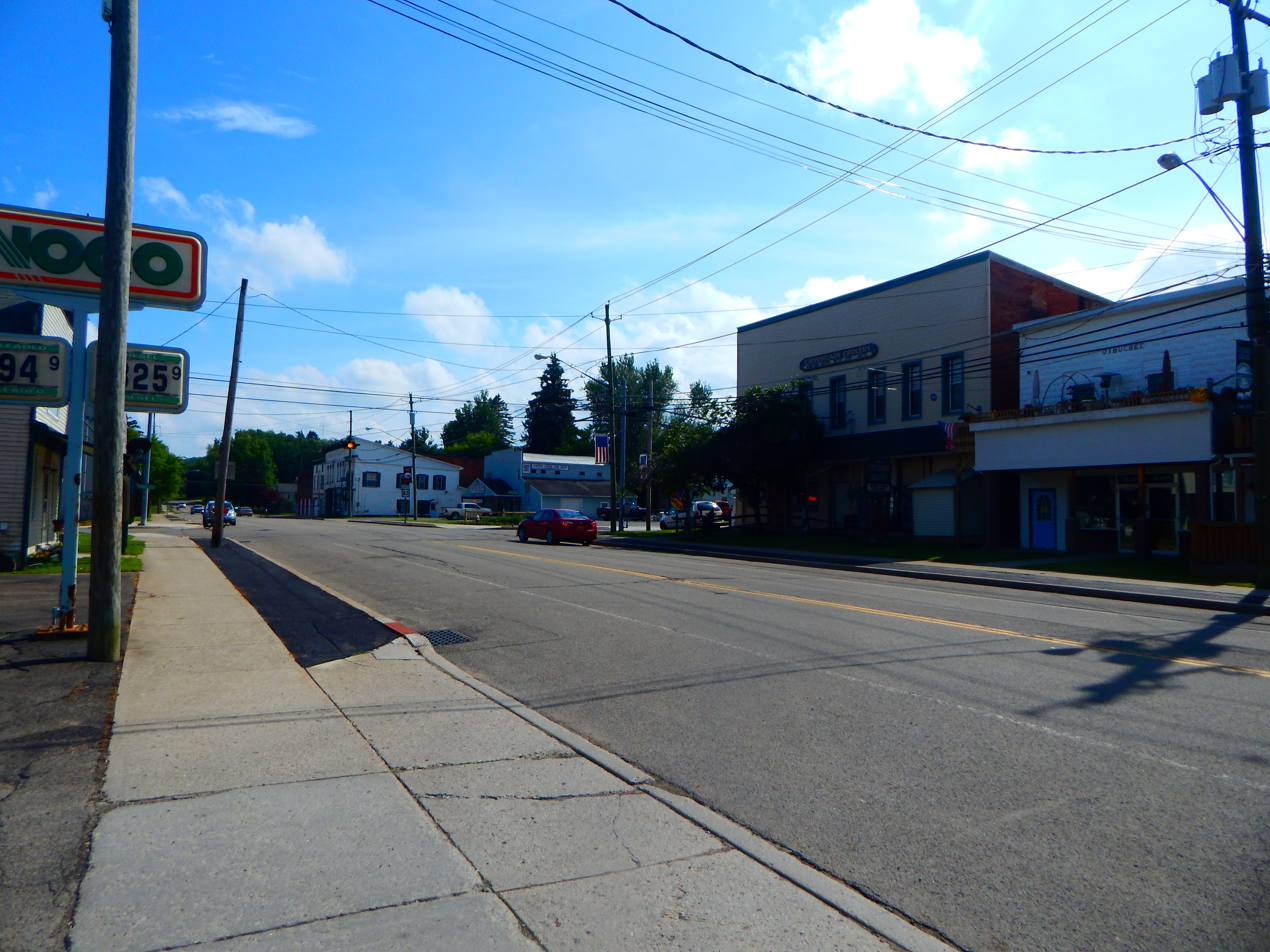
- Downtown Cherry Creek with NY 83 running through the center

- Location within Chautauqua County and New York state

- Location within New York Location within the United States
- Coordinates: 42°17′40″N 79°05′50″W
- Country: United States
- State: New York
- County: Chautauqua

Government
  - Type: Town council
  - Town supervisor: William Young
  - Town council: Members: • Mark R. Mansfield (R); • James R. Abbey (R); • Peter Smallback (D); • Larry Johnson (R)

Area
  - Total: 36.64 sq mi (94.91 km^{2})
  - Land: 36.63 sq mi (94.87 km^{2})
  - Water: 0.012 sq mi (.03 km^{2})
- Elevation: 1,306 ft (398 m)

Population (2020)
  - Total: 1,036
  - Estimate (2021): 1,038
  - Density: 29.1/sq mi (11.23/km^{2})
- Time zone: UTC-5 (Eastern (EST))
  - Summer (DST): UTC-4 (EDT)
- ZIP Codes: 14723 (Cherry Creek); 14138 (South Dayton)
- FIPS code: 36-013-15198
- GNIS feature ID: 0946509
- Website: cherrycreekny.org

Cherry Creek is a town in Chautauqua County, New York, United States. The population was 1,036 at the 2020 census. The name is derived from that of a small stream that flows through the town amid many cherry trees.

Cherry Creek is situated on the east border of the county, northeast of Jamestown. There is also a hamlet named Cherry Creek located within the town.

== History ==
The community was first settled circa 1815, and the town of Cherry Creek was formed in 1829 from part of the town of Ellington. The settlement got its name from a cherry tree planted by Holland Land Company surveyor Joshua Bentley to mark the center of the new town. The village, which was incorporated in 1893, voted on February 2, 2017, to dissolve into the surrounding town.

== Geography ==
According to the United States Census Bureau, the town has a total area of 36.6 square miles (94.9 km^{2}), of which 0.01 square miles (0.03 km^{2}), or 0.04%, is water.

New York State Route 83 is a major north-south highway in the eastern half of the town. Chautauqua County Route 70 (the westernmost part of Leon Road) enters the town from the east. The New York and Lake Erie Railroad serves the town with freight and occasional passenger rail service; Chautauqua CARTS serves the town on its Sinclairville-to-Frewsburg line.

Cherry Creek is also the name of a stream that flows into Conewango Creek in the eastern part of the town.

=== Adjacent towns and areas ===
Cherry Creek is east of the town of Charlotte. It is south of the town of Villenova and north of the town of Ellington. Cherry Creek's east town line is shared by the town of Leon in Cattaraugus County.

== Demographics ==
Historical population
Census	Pop.	Note	%±
1830	574		—
1840	1,141		98.8%
1850	1,311		14.9%
1860	1,359		3.7%
1870	1,359		0.0%
1880	1,354		−0.4%
1890	1,481		9.4%
1900	1,745		17.8%
1910	1,380		−20.9%
1920	1,204		−12.8%
1930	1,114		−7.5%
1940	1,088		−2.3%
1950	1,132		4.0%
1960	1,206		6.5%
1970	1,140		−5.5%
1980	1,227		7.6%
1990	1,064		−13.3%
2000	1,152		8.3%
2010	1,118		−3.0%
2020	1,036		−7.3%
2021 (est.)	1,038	▲	0.2%
U.S. Decennial Census

As of the census of 2000, there were 1,152 people, 413 households, and 315 families residing in the town. The population density was 31.5 inhabitants per square mile (12.2/km^{2}). There were 498 housing units at an average density of 13.6 per square mile (5.3/km^{2}). The racial makeup of the town was 97.14% White, 0.09% Black or African American, 0.17% Native American, 0.17% Asian, 0.09% Pacific Islander, 1.56% from other races, and 0.78% from two or more races. Hispanic or Latino of any race were 2.00% of the population.

There were 413 households, out of which 38.0% had children under the age of 18 living with them, 57.1% were married couples living together, 10.9% had a female householder with no husband present, and 23.5% were non-families. 18.4% of all households were made up of individuals, and 6.8% had someone living alone who was 65 years of age or older. The average household size was 2.77 and the average family size was 3.12.

In the town, the population was spread out, with 29.9% under the age of 18, 7.5% from 18 to 24, 29.3% from 25 to 44, 22.7% from 45 to 64, and 10.6% who were 65 years of age or older. The median age was 36 years. For every 100 females, there were 103.2 males. For every 100 females age 18 and over, there were 100.7 males.

The median income for a household in the town was $36,146, and the median income for a family was $36,250. Males had a median income of $30,089 versus $22,857 for females. The per capita income for the town was $14,980. About 11.4% of families and 14.0% of the population were below the poverty line, including 22.4% of those under age 18 and 12.9% of those age 65 or over.

== Notable people ==
- Ozra Amander Hadley, former governor of Arkansas
- Egburt E. Woodbury, former New York State Attorney General
- Lewis Emery, Jr., former politician and oil man

== Features ==
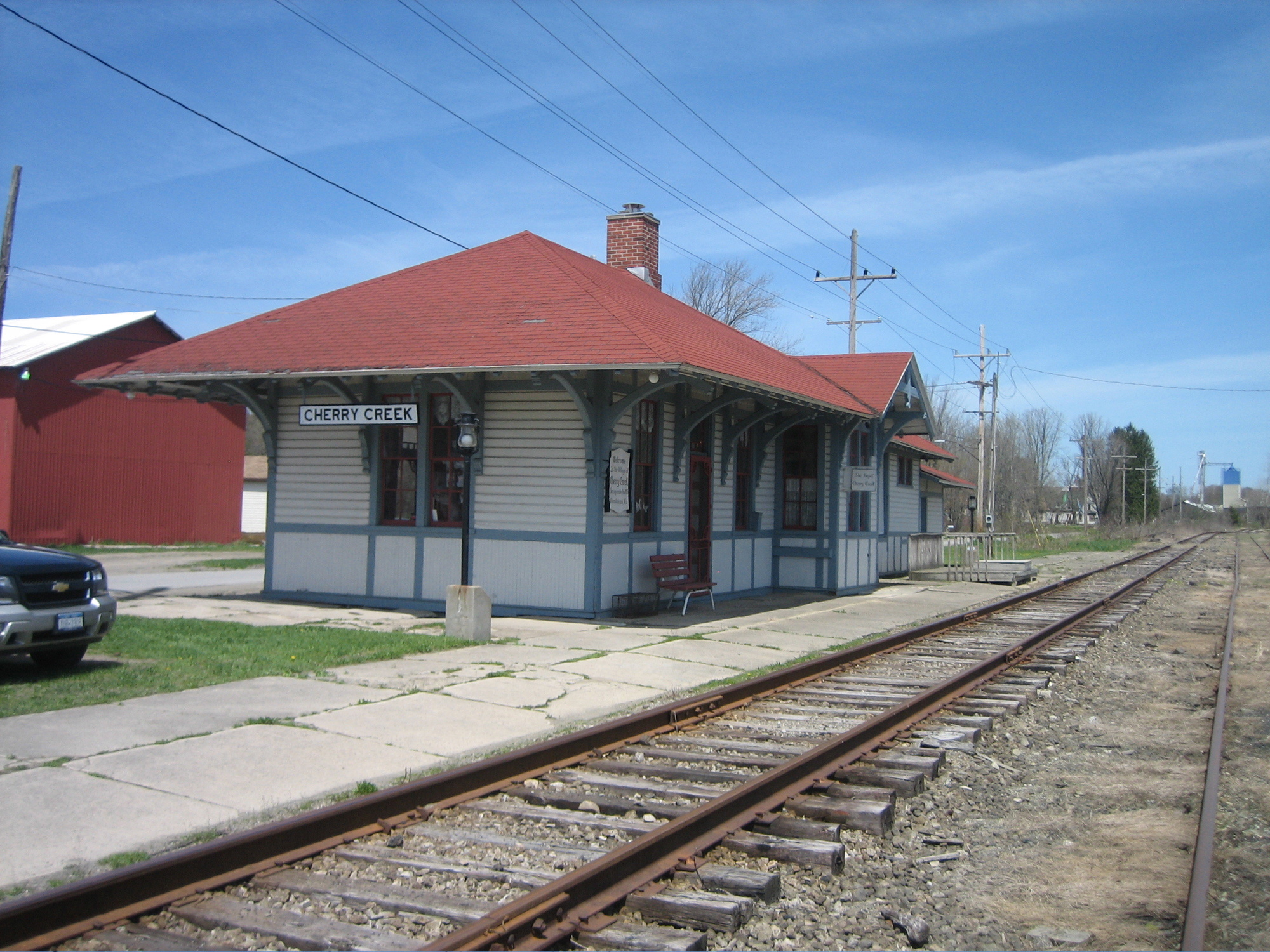
Cherry Creek station for the Buffalo and South Western Railroad

- Cherry Creek – A stream that flows into Conewango Creek by Cherry Creek village.
- Cherry Creek – The hamlet of Cherry Creek, near the center of the town on NY Route 83.
- Cockaigne – A former skiing facility in the southwest corner of the town, west of Thornton. Historic lodge burned in January 2011, and the resort closed due to the fire at the end of that skiing season. It was re-opened in winter of 2018-19.
- Gates Corners – A location on the south town line on Pickup Hill Road.
- George Nelson Frost House – built c. 1860, now a country bed and breakfast.
- Kings School Corner – A location in the southeast corner of the town on Route 83.
- Shattuck School – A location west of Cherry Creek village.
- Thornton – A hamlet in the southwest corner of the town at the junction of Route 66 and Route 85.
