= Cherry Creek (hamlet), New York =

Cherry Creek, New York
- Hamlet and CDP
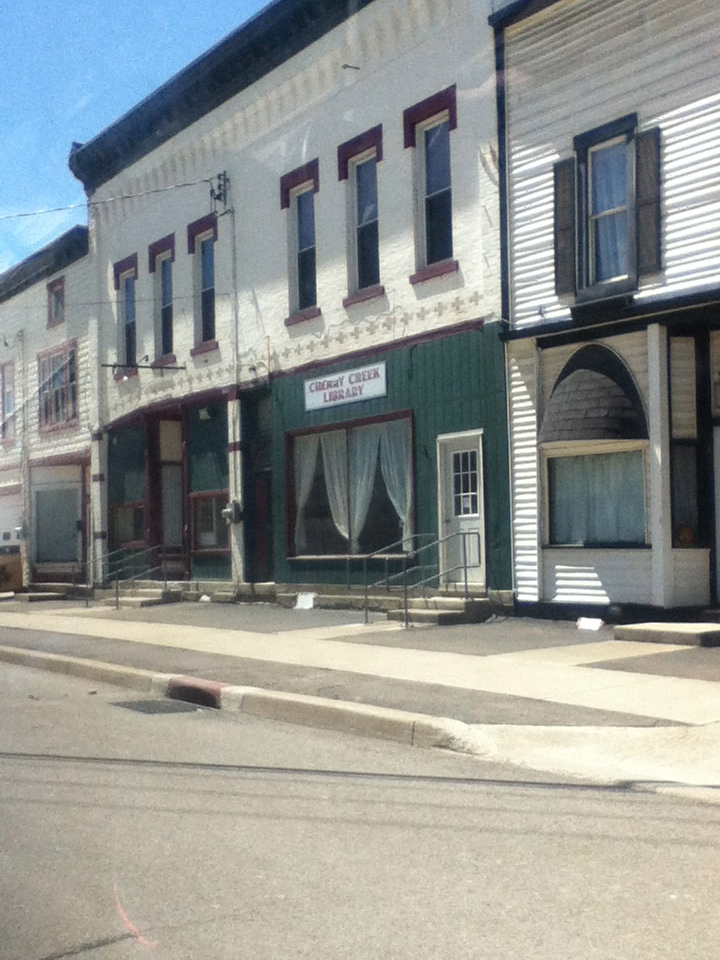
- Cherry Creek Library

- Location within the state of New York
- Coordinates: 42°17′41″N 79°5′50″W
- Country: United States
- State: New York
- County: Chautauqua
- Town: Cherry Creek

Area
  - Total: 1.36 sq mi (3.53 km^{2})
  - Land: 1.36 sq mi (3.53 km^{2})
  - Water: 0 sq mi (0.00 km^{2})
- Elevation: 1,302 ft (397 m)

Population (2020)
  - Total: 409
  - Density: 300.2/sq mi (115.91/km^{2})
- Time zone: UTC-5 (Eastern (EST))
  - Summer (DST): UTC-4 (EDT)
- ZIP code: 14723
- Area code: 716
- FIPS code: 36-15187
- GNIS feature ID: 0946509

Cherry Creek is a hamlet (and census-designated place) in Chautauqua County, New York, United States. The population was 461 at the 2010 census, when it was an incorporated village. The hamlet is within the town of Cherry Creek near the east border of the county. It is located on New York State Route 83 and a stream called Cherry Creek.

== History ==
The hamlet is the site of the earliest settlement of the town, in 1815. The settlement got its name from a cherry tree planted by Holland Land Company surveyor Joshua Bentley to mark the center of the new town. It was formally incorporated as a village in 1893. On February 2, 2017, residents of the village voted 70 to 32 in favor of dissolving into the surrounding town of Cherry Creek. The village was dissolved on December 31, 2017.

== Geography ==
Cherry Creek is located in eastern Chautauqua County at 42°17′40″N 79°5′50″W (42.294654, -79.097353), east of the geographic center of the town of Cherry Creek. A stream by the same name flows east through the hamlet towards Conewango Creek, which in turn is a tributary of the Allegheny River and part of the Mississippi River basin.

According to the United States Census Bureau, the village in the 2010 census has a total area of 1.4 square miles (3.5 km^{2}), all land.

== Demographics ==
Historical population
| Census | Pop. | Note | %± |
|---|---|---|---|
| 1880 | 448 | | — |
| 1890 | 676 | | 50.9% |
| 1900 | 701 | | 3.7% |
| 1910 | 606 | | −13.6% |
| 1920 | 527 | | −13.0% |
| 1930 | 539 | | 2.3% |
| 1940 | 529 | | −1.9% |
| 1950 | 631 | | 19.3% |
| 1960 | 649 | | 2.9% |
| 1970 | 658 | | 1.4% |
| 1980 | 677 | | 2.9% |
| 1990 | 539 | | −20.4% |
| 2000 | 551 | | 2.2% |
| 2010 | 461 | | −16.3% |
| 2020 | 409 | | −11.3% |
U.S. Decennial Census

As of the census of 2000, there were 551 people, 198 households, and 156 families residing in the village. The population density was 404.8 inhabitants per square mile (156.3/km^{2}). There were 222 housing units at an average density of 163.1 per square mile (63.0/km^{2}). The racial makeup of the village was 96.91% White, 0.18% Black or African American, 0.36% Native American, 0.36% Asian, 0.18% Pacific Islander, 0.91% from other races, and 1.09% from two or more races. Hispanic or Latino of any race were 1.27% of the population.

There were 198 households, out of which 40.4% had children under the age of 18 living with them, 52.5% were married couples living together, 16.2% had a female householder with no husband present, and 21.2% were non-families. 15.7% of all households were made up of individuals, and 7.6% had someone living alone who was 65 years of age or older. The average household size was 2.78 and the average family size was 3.03.

In the village, the population was spread out, with 31.2% under the age of 18, 6.5% from 18 to 24, 29.9% from 25 to 44, 22.1% from 45 to 64, and 10.2% who were 65 years of age or older. The median age was 36 years. For every 100 females, there were 94.0 males. For every 100 females age 18 and over, there were 96.4 males.

The median income for a household in the village was $31,528, and the median income for a family was $32,500. Males had a median income of $31,406 versus $24,038 for females. The per capita income for the village was $15,358. About 15.9% of families and 18.3% of the population were below the poverty line, including 34.9% of those under age 18 and none of those age 65 or over.
