= Lily Dale, New York =

Hamlet in New York, United States

Coordinates: 42°21′06″N 79°19′27″W

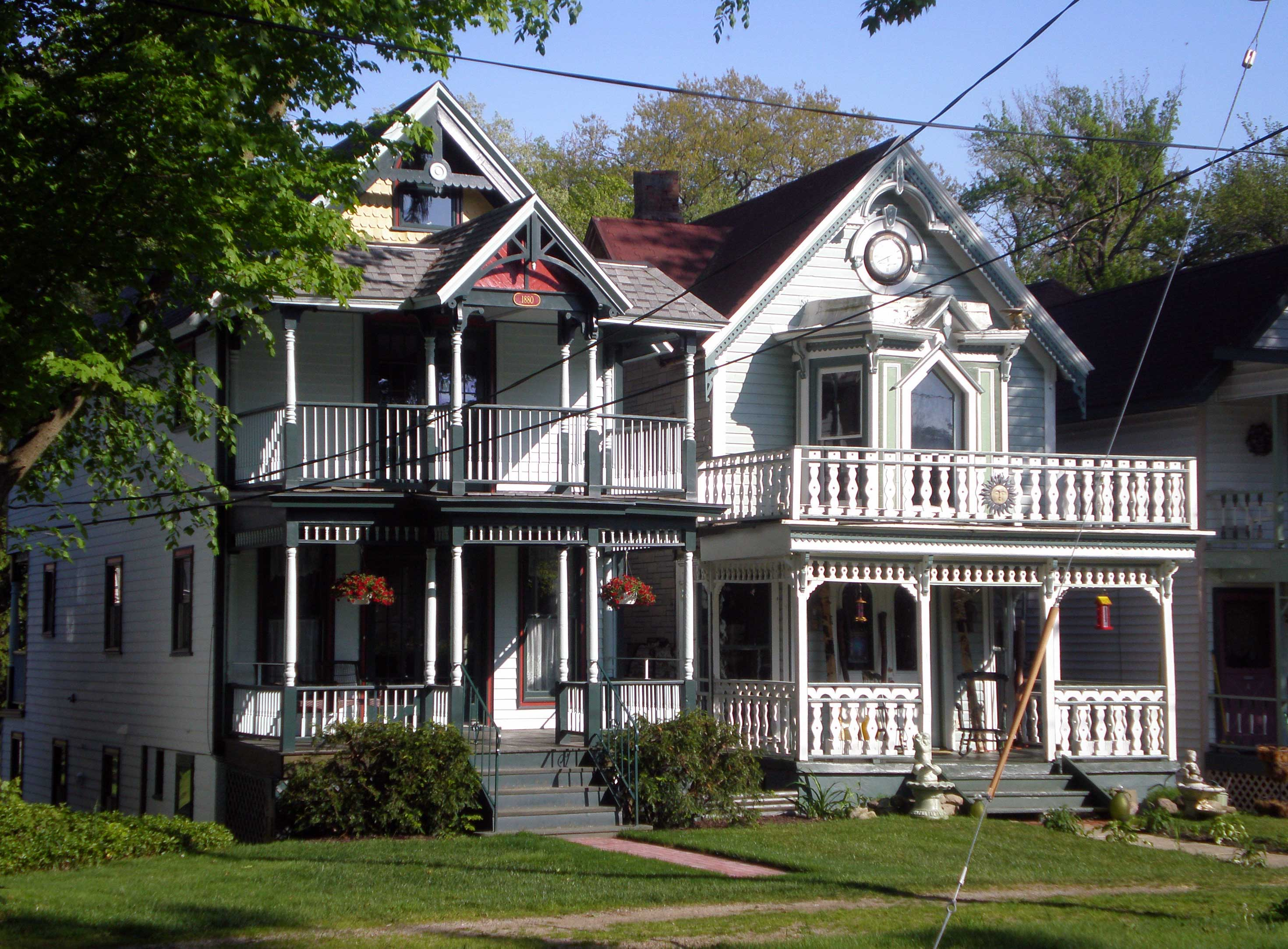
The dominant architectural style in Lily Dale dates from the 1800s.

Lily Dale is a hamlet, connected with the Spiritualist movement, located in the Town of Pomfret on the east side of Cassadaga Lake, next to the Village of Cassadaga. Located in western New York State, it is one hour southwest of Buffalo, halfway to the Pennsylvania border. In 2022 the community was listed on the National Register of Historic Places as a historic district, citing several landmark buildings of significance at the state level.

Lily Dale's year-round population is estimated to be 275. Each year approximately 22,000 visitors come for classes, workshops, public church services and mediumship demonstrations, lectures, and private appointments with mediums. In recent years, guest lecturers have included Lisa Williams, Dee Wallace, members of Ghost Hunters, Tibetan monks, James Van Praagh, Dr. Wayne Dyer, and Deepak Chopra.

Lily Dale was incorporated in 1879 as Cassadaga Lake Free Association, a camp and meeting place for Spiritualists and Freethinkers. The name was changed to The City of Light in 1903 and finally to Lily Dale Assembly in 1906. The purpose of Lily Dale was to further the science, philosophy, and religion of Spiritualism.

Lily Dale was featured in the HBO documentary No One Dies in Lily Dale. Most of the hamlet was listed on the National Register of Historic Places in 2022.

== Geography and features ==
Lily Dale is located on the east side of Upper Cassadaga Lake, one of four lakes that comprise the Cassadaga Lakes system, at an elevation of approximately 1325 ft. Its coordinates are 42°21'06" North, 79°19'27" West (42.351725, −79.324211). Its main route of access is New York State Route 60, which is located about 0.5 miles east of the hamlet and runs north and south to the cities of Dunkirk and Jamestown.

Leolyn Woods is a 10-acre tract of old growth forest on the grounds of the community of Lily Dale. Lily Dale Assembly charges a fee for admission during its summer season but it is free and open to the public at other times of year. The woodlot is small but contains some of the most accessible very old, large trees in the region, including eastern white pine standing 135 feet tall. Other species of big trees include northern red oak, eastern hemlock, red maple, sugar maple, cucumber magnolia, and black cherry. Some trees are estimated to range in age from 200 to 400 years.

== Spiritualism and the Lily Dale community ==
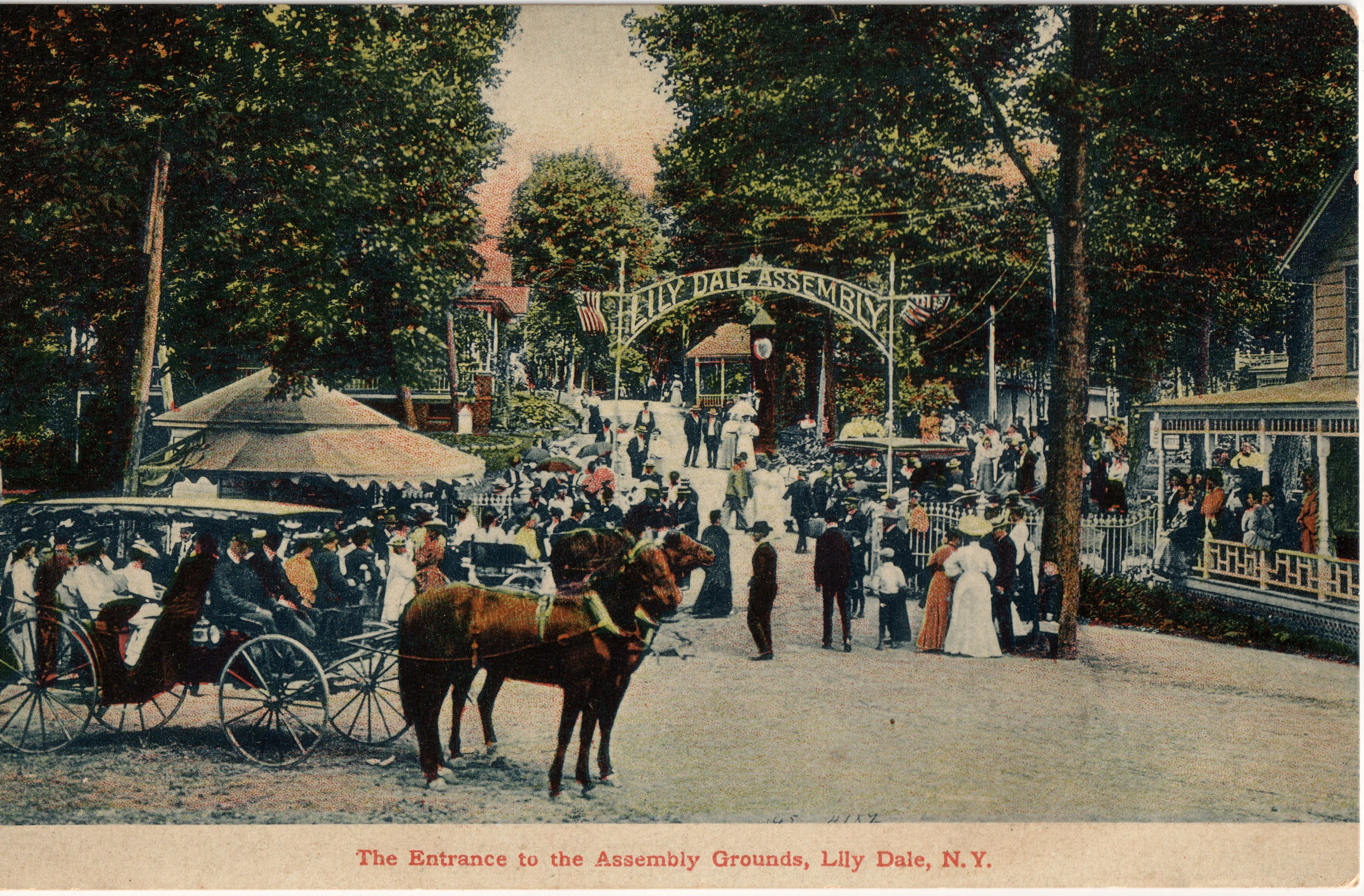
The Entrance to the Assembly Grounds, Lily Dale NY. in the early 20th century

Lily Dale became the largest center of the Spiritualist movement as other similar organizations went into decline. Other communities such as Southern Cassadaga Spiritualist Camp (Florida) and Camp Chesterfield (Indiana) were founded on similar principles and are still active organizations. The Fox Cottage of the Fox sisters fame was moved from Hydesville, New York and transported to Lily Dale in 1915 although on September 21, 1955, it was destroyed by fire.

Lily Dale hosts the headquarters of the National Spiritualist Association of Churches (NSAC), founded in 1893: the NSAC's first president, Harrison D. Barrett, was himself a Lily Dale resident.

A large population of people associated with Spiritualism reside in Lily Dale year round. Television mediums Lisa Williams and Michelle Whitedove have homes here.

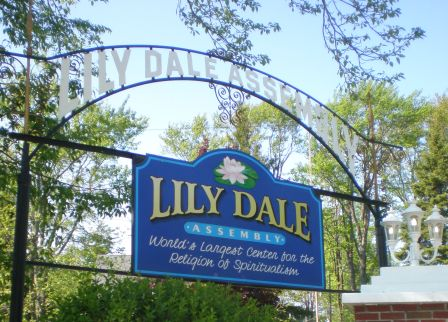
Entrance to Lily Dale Spiritualist community, New York

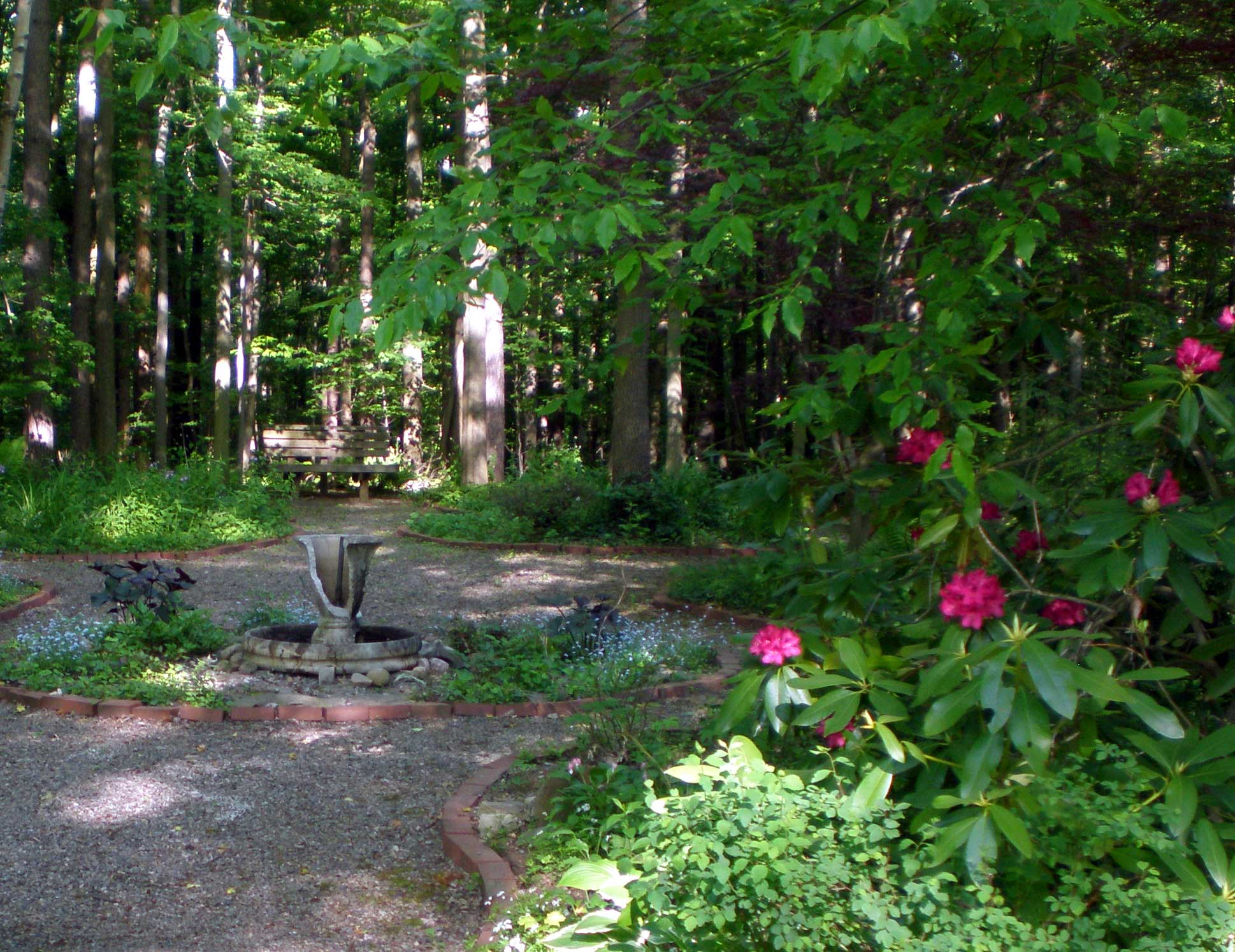
The former site of the Fox Sisters' cabin is now a small clearing in the woods

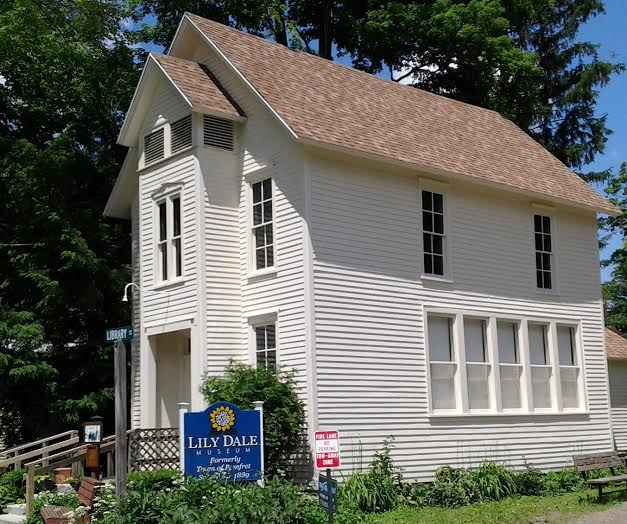
The Lily Dale Museum is located within a renovated schoolhouse building and features exhibits on the history of Spiritualism

== The Lily Dale Spiritualist Assembly ==
The Lily Dale Spiritualist Assembly holds year round meetings and provides seminars on topics such as mediumship, spiritualist studies and topics within the subject of the paranormal. Well-known speakers such as Deepak Chopra, Dr. Wayne Dyer and John Edward have frequently appeared at Lily Dale. This private community is home to The Marion Skidmore Library, Lily Dale Museum, its own Volunteer Fire Department, and also is the location of the already mentioned headquarters of The National Spiritualist Association of Churches.

Lily Dale contains 160 private residences, two hotels, guest houses, Spiritualist and New Age bookstores, two eateries, and a café. Free Summer Program booklets announce events such as mediumship demonstrations, religious services, workshops, thought exchange meetings, and healing services. Visitors can also find camp grounds for either a tent or Recreation Vehicles, picnic grounds, and a lake front beach for swimming and sunbathing. Admission on Sunday mornings is waived to allow for church attendance.

== In popular culture ==
Lily Dale is the backdrop for a series of young adult paranormal novels by New York Times bestselling author Wendy Corsi Staub, who grew up a few miles from Lily Dale, New York. Staub has also written an adult thriller set in Lily Dale entitled In the Blink of an Eye.

Lily Dale was the setting in the fictional TV series Supernatural in Season 7 episode 7 called "The Mentalists."

Lily Dale is the inspiration for the nearby Jamestown-based rock band 10,000 Maniacs song "Lilydale" from the album "The Wishing Chair".
