= Lisa Williams (psychic) =

British self-proclaimed psychic

- Born: Lisa Michelle Williams; 19 June 1973 (age 52)
- Occupation: Psychic medium
- Spouse: Kevin Harris (m. 2004, separated)
- Children: 1

Lisa Michelle Williams (born 19 June 1973) is a British self-proclaimed psychic and medium, she is also an author, known for her appearances on television in the UK and the U.S.

== Career ==
Williams starred in two shows on Lifetime Television: Lisa Williams: Life Among the Dead (2006–2007) and Lisa Williams: Voices From the Other Side (2008).

Williams also appeared on Deal or No Deal when the episode aired on NBC on 31 March 2008. She also made a guest appearance in one of Lifetime's other shows, America's Psychic Challenge.

== Critical reception ==
On 21 June 2019, media personality and skeptic Alistair MacLauchlan presented his review of Williams in part three of four medium investigations he conducted in Scotland. He attended one of William's mediumship events in Edinburgh. He reported that in her opening statement Williams asked how many people were there for forensics. One of the seminars the following day was on forensics, breaking down evidence supplied from spirits and extrasensory perception. According to MacLauchlan, while highly publicized missing person cases tend to attract many mediums who use it as a means of building their portfolio, most law enforcement do not acknowledge their involvement.

Of her event, he says, as Williams began the discussion, she primed the audience saying they should "think outside the box" and make connections to the messages she claims to receive from the dead because they can sometimes be muddy. Further MacLauchlan then reported she went on with basic cold reading tactics even speaking to a dog that had died. MacLauchlan concluded the article saying that while Williams has good stage presence building rapport with her audience, she uses wild guesses from a primed audience, firing questions then picking through their reactions that fit her narrative.

In addition, Williams' association with Princess Märtha Louise of Norway has caused friction within Norway's Royal Family.

== Personal life ==
On 30 October 2004, Williams married Kevin Harris. They moved to Los Angeles, California, when she was producing her TV shows. On her Hay House Radio show on 9 December 2009, Williams announced that she and Kevin were separating. Williams was in a relationship with a female partner, but later became single and lived in Upstate New York with her son and their two dogs.

== Bibliography ==
- Life Among the Dead (2009) ISBN 1416596372
- The Survival of the Soul (Do You Want to Know Everything?) (2011) ISBN 978-1401928049
- I Speak to Dead People: Can You? (2014) ISBN 978-1496078025
