= South Dayton, New York =

- Village
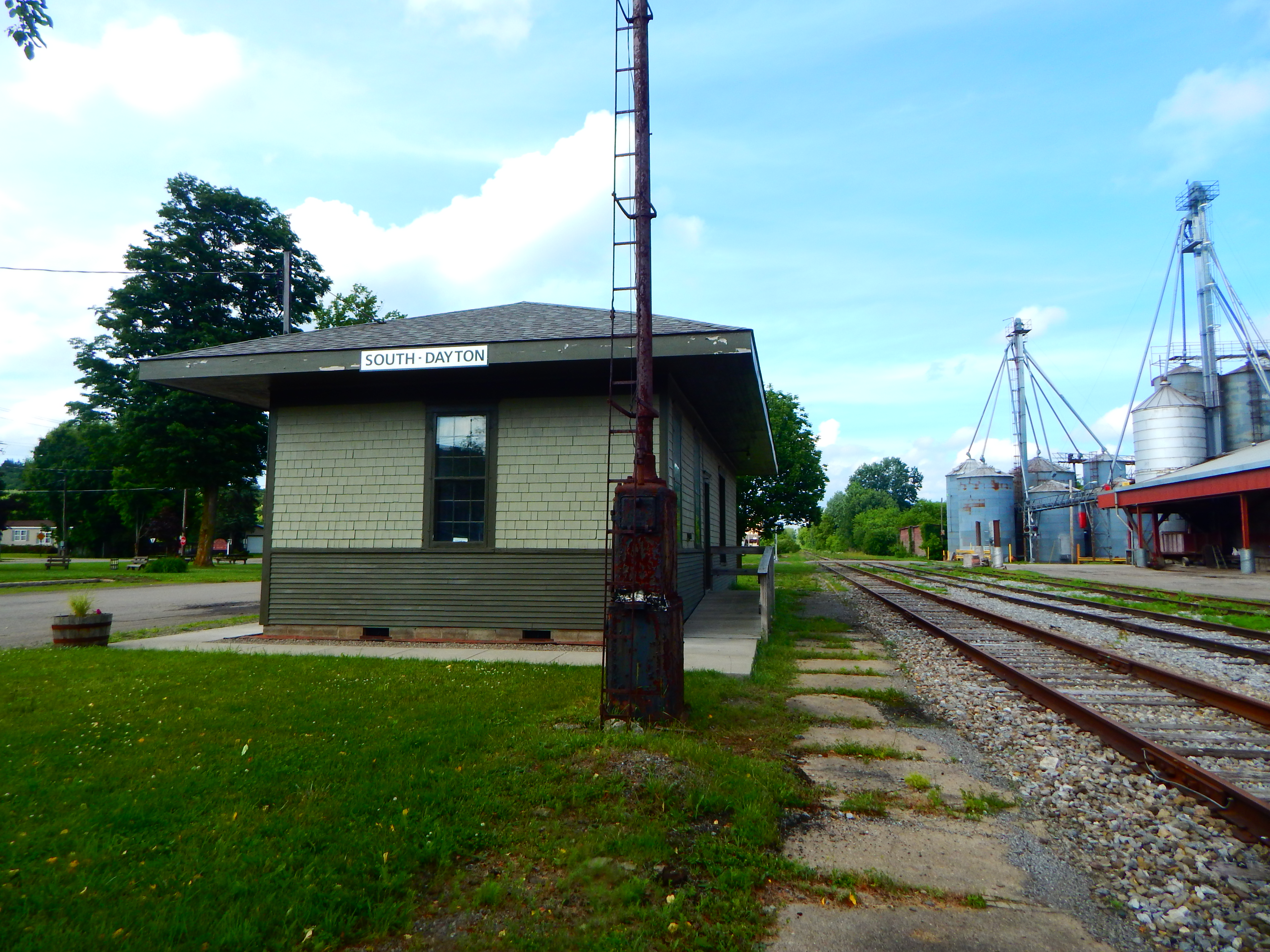
- The former Buffalo and South Western Railroad station in South Dayton.

- Location within the state of New York
- Coordinates: 42°21′46″N 79°3′6″W
- Country: United States
- State: New York
- County: Cattaraugus
- Town: Dayton

Area
  - Total: 1.00 sq mi (2.60 km^{2})
  - Land: 1.00 sq mi (2.60 km^{2})
  - Water: 0 sq mi (0.00 km^{2})
- Elevation: 1,306 ft (398 m)

Population (2020)
  - Total: 541
  - Density: 537.9/sq mi (207.69/km^{2})
- Time zone: UTC-5 (Eastern (EST))
  - Summer (DST): UTC-4 (EDT)
- ZIP code: 14138
- Area code: 716
- FIPS code: 36-68891
- GNIS feature ID: 0965735
- Website: www.southdayton.org

South Dayton is a village in Cattaraugus County, New York, United States. The population was 564 at the 2020 census. The village lies within the town of Dayton by the southwest corner of the town and less than a mile from the border of Chautauqua County.

== History ==
The community was also known as "Pine Valley"; the name Pine Valley was later used for the name of the local school district (shared with neighboring Cherry Creek), the campus of which is situated southwest of the village. The arrival of the railroad in 1875 promoted the growth of the village, which incorporated in 1915.

Possibly the most famous event to occur in South Dayton is that a revelation is reported to have been received by the Mormon prophet, Joseph Smith, in the home of Freeman Nickerson on October 12, 1833, known as Section 100 of the Doctrine and Covenants. At the time the settlement was within the town of Perrysburg.

South Dayton was used as a filming location for the 1987 comedy road film, Planes, Trains and Automobiles. It was also featured in the classic film, The Natural, which starred Robert Redford.

== Geography ==
South Dayton is located at 42°21′46″N 79°3′6″W (42.362796, -79.051715). The western boundary of the village follows the Chautauqua County line.

According to the United States Census Bureau, the village has a total area of 1.0 square mile (2.6 km^{2}), all land.

County Road 2 (Main Street in the village) and NY-322 pass through the village. The New York and Lake Erie Railroad serves the village with freight and occasional passenger rail service.

Skunks Corners is a crossroads in the southwestern part of the village.

== Demographics ==
Historical population
Census	Pop.	Note	%±
1880	318		—
1920	655		—
1930	570		−13.0%
1940	643		12.8%
1950	727		13.1%
1960	696		−4.3%
1970	688		−1.1%
1980	661		−3.9%
1990	601		−9.1%
2000	662		10.1%
2010	620		−6.3%
2020	541		−12.7%
2021 (est.)	558	▲	3.1%
U.S. Decennial Census

As of the census of 2000, there were 662 people, 248 households, and 163 families residing in the village. The population density was 658.2 inhabitants per square mile (254.1/km^{2}). There were 268 housing units at an average density of 266.5 per square mile (102.9/km^{2}). The racial makeup of the village was 97.73% White, 0.30% African American, 0.30% Native American, 0.45% from other races, and 1.21% from two or more races. Hispanic or Latino of any race were 1.51% of the population.

There were 248 households, out of which 35.5% had children under the age of 18 living with them, 44.0% were married couples living together, 16.1% had a female householder with no husband present, and 33.9% were non-families. 25.8% of all households were made up of individuals, and 10.9% had someone living alone who was 65 years of age or older. The average household size was 2.67 and the average family size was 3.20.

In the village, the population was spread out, with 33.7% under the age of 18, 7.1% from 18 to 24, 26.6% from 25 to 44, 21.0% from 45 to 64, and 11.6% who were 65 years of age or older. The median age was 33 years. For every 100 females, there were 87.0 males. For every 100 females age 18 and over, there were 88.4 males.

The median income for a household in the village was $29,375, and the median income for a family was $32,917. Males had a median income of $25,833 versus $22,404 for females. The per capita income for the village was $13,187. About 15.4% of families and 17.3% of the population were below the poverty line, including 20.0% of those under age 18 and 6.2% of those age 65 or over.

== Notable people ==
- Bill Bergey, retired National Football League player who made five Pro Bowls during his career; born and raised in the village
- Nick Langworthy, U.S. Representative for New York's 23rd congressional district since 2023
- Tim Nobles, 7-time State Champion coach (1991, 1992, 1995, 1997, 2003-2005) for girls basketball at Pine Valley Central School. Ended his head coaching career after the 2014-2015 season with 536 wins, including 17 league titles, 12 Section VI titles, and 6 State Championships as head coach. Pine Valley's basketball court has been renamed, "Tim Nobles Court." Inducted into the Section VI Hall of Fame in 2018.
