= Chautauqua County, New York =

County in New York, United States

- County
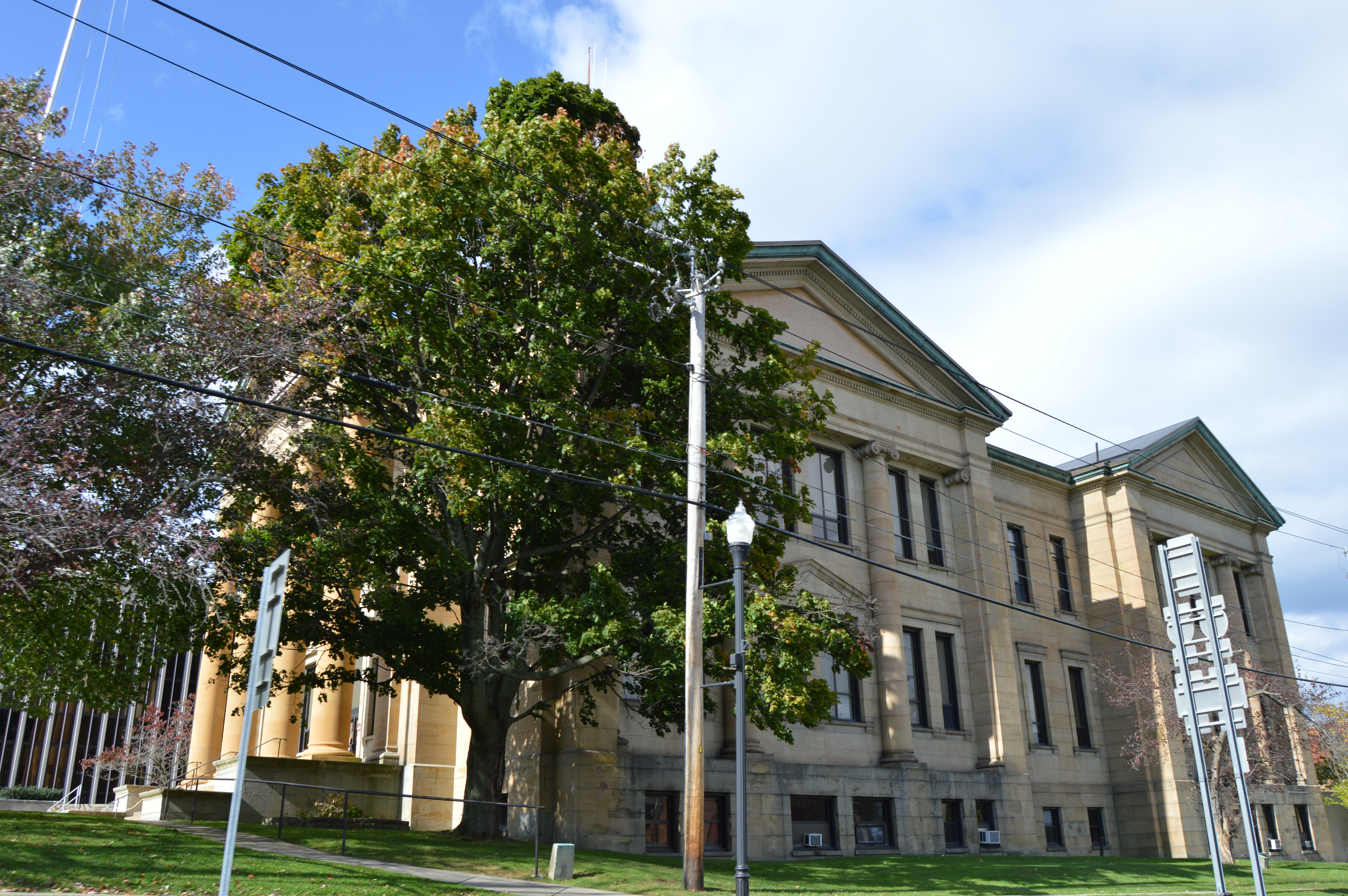
- Chautauqua County Courthouse in Mayville

- Flag Seal

- Location within the U.S. state of New York
- Coordinates: 42°18′N 79°25′W
- Country: United States
- State: New York
- Founded: February 9, 1811
- Named for: Chautauqua Lake
- Seat: Mayville
- Largest city: Jamestown

Area
  - Total: 1,500 sq mi (3,900 km^{2})
  - Land: 1,060 sq mi (2,700 km^{2})
  - Water: 440 sq mi (1,100 km^{2}) 29%

Population (2020)
  - Total: 127,657
  - Estimate (2025): 124,126 ▼
  - Density: 117/sq mi (45/km^{2})
- Time zone: UTC−5 (Eastern)
  - Summer (DST): UTC−4 (EDT)
- Congressional district: 23rd
- Website: chqgov.com

Chautauqua County is the westernmost county in the U.S. state of New York. As of the 2020 census, the population was 127,657. Its county seat is Mayville, and its largest city is Jamestown. Its name is believed to be the lone surviving remnant of the Erie language, a tongue lost in the 17th century Beaver Wars; its meaning is unknown and a subject of speculation. The county was created in 1808 and organized in 1811. The county is part of the Western New York region of the state.

Chautauqua County comprises the Jamestown–Dunkirk–Fredonia, NY Micropolitan Statistical Area. It is located south east of Lake Erie and includes a small portion of the Cattaraugus Reservation of the Seneca.

== History ==
Prior to European colonization, most of what is now Chautauqua County was inhabited by the indigenous Erie people prior to the Beaver Wars in the 1650s. French forces traversed the territory beginning in 1615. The Seneca Nation conquered the territory during the Beaver Wars and held it through the next century until siding with the British crown, their allies for most of the 18th century, against the American revolutionaries in the American Revolutionary War.

Chautauqua County was organized by the state legislature during the development of western New York after the American Revolutionary War and the ratification of The Treaty of Canandaigua, between the United States and the Council of the Six Nations. It was officially separated from Genesee County on March 11, 1808. This partition was performed under the same terms that produced Cattaraugus and Niagara counties. The partition was done for political purposes, but the counties were not properly organized for self-government, so they were all administered as part of Niagara County.

On February 9, 1811, Chautauqua was completely organized, and its separate government was launched. This established Chautauqua as a county of 1,100 square miles (2,800 square kilometres) of land. Chautauqua has not been altered since.

The first New York Chautauqua Assembly was organized in 1874 by Methodist minister John Heyl Vincent and businessman Lewis Miller in the county at a campsite on the shores of Chautauqua Lake.

== Geography ==
According to the U.S. Census Bureau, the county has a total area of 1,500 square miles (3,900 km^{2}), of which 1,060 square miles (2,700 km^{2}) is land and 440 square miles (1,100 km^{2}) (29%) is water.

Chautauqua County, in the southwestern corner of New York State, along the New York-Pennsylvania border, is the westernmost of New York's counties. Chautauqua Lake is located in the center of the county, and Lake Erie is its northern border.

Part of the Eastern Continental Divide runs through Chautauqua County. The area that drains into the Conewango Creek (including Chautauqua Lake) eventually empties into the Gulf of Mexico; the rest of the county's watershed empties into Lake Erie and via Lake Ontario and the St. Lawrence Seaway into the North Atlantic Ocean. This divide, known as the Chautauqua Ridge, can be used to mark the border between the Southern Tier and the Niagara Frontier. It is also a significant dividing point in the county's political scene, with the "North County" being centered on Dunkirk and the "South County" centered on Jamestown each having their own interests.

The county is generally composed of rolling hills and valleys, with elevations ranging anywhere between 1100 and 2100 feet, although the land within a few miles of Lake Erie is generally flat and at an elevation of 1000 feet or lower. The lowest point in the county is Lake Erie, at 571 feet (174 meters), and the highest point is Gurnsey Benchmark at 2,180 feet (660 meters).

=== Adjacent counties ===
- Erie County - northeast
- Cattaraugus County - east
- Warren County, Pennsylvania - south
- Erie County, Pennsylvania - southwest

Chautauqua County is one of the few counties in the US to border two counties of the same name in different states (Erie County in New York and Pennsylvania).

=== Major highways ===
- I-86 / NY 17 / Southern Tier Expressway
- I-90 Toll / New York Thruway
- US 20
- US 62
- NY 5
- NY 39
- NY 60
- NY 83
- NY 394
- NY 426
- NY 430
- NY 474

== Demographics ==
Historical population
Census	Pop.	Note	%±
1820	12,568		—
1830	34,671		175.9%
1840	47,975		38.4%
1850	50,493		5.2%
1860	58,422		15.7%
1870	59,327		1.5%
1880	65,342		10.1%
1890	75,202		15.1%
1900	88,314		17.4%
1910	105,126		19.0%
1920	115,348		9.7%
1930	126,457		9.6%
1940	123,580		−2.3%
1950	135,189		9.4%
1960	145,377		7.5%
1970	147,305		1.3%
1980	146,925		−0.3%
1990	141,895		−3.4%
2000	139,750		−1.5%
2010	134,905		−3.5%
2020	127,657		−5.4%
2025 (est.)	124,126	▼	−2.8%
U.S. Decennial Census; 1790-1960 1900-1990; 1990-2000 2010-2020

=== 2020 census ===
Chautauqua County, New York – Racial and ethnic composition Note: the US Census treats Hispanic/Latino as an ethnic category. This table excludes Latinos from the racial categories and assigns them to a separate category. Hispanics/Latinos may be of any race.
Race / Ethnicity (NH = Non-Hispanic)	Pop 1980	Pop 1990	Pop 2000	Pop 2010	Pop 2020	% 1980	% 1990	% 2000	% 2010	% 2020
White alone (NH)	141,879	134,436	128,481	120,463	106,063	96.57%	94.74%	91.94%	89.29%	83.08%
Black or African American alone (NH)	1,869	2,297	2,820	2,763	2,891	1.27%	1.62%	2.02%	2.05%	2.26%
Native American or Alaska Native alone (NH)	357	534	558	576	497	0.24%	0.38%	0.40%	0.43%	0.39%
Asian alone (NH)	374	506	493	676	796	0.25%	0.36%	0.35%	0.50%	0.62%
Native Hawaiian or Pacific Islander alone (NH)	x	x	29	31	49	x	x	0.02%	0.02%	0.04%
Other race alone (NH)	180	67	187	90	363	0.12%	0.05%	0.13%	0.07%	0.28%
Mixed race or Multiracial (NH)	x	x	1,281	2,065	5,229	x	x	0.92%	1.53%	4.10%
Hispanic or Latino (any race)	2,266	4,055	5,901	8,241	11,769	1.54%	2.86%	4.22%	6.11%	9.22%
Total	146,925	141,895	139,750	134,905	127,657	100.00%	100.00%	100.00%	100.00%	100.00%

=== 2000 census ===
As of the 2000 census, there were 139,750 people, 54,515 households, and 35,979 families in the county. The population density was 132 people per square mile (51 people/km^{2}). There were 64,900 housing units at an average density of 61 per square mile (24/km^{2}). The racial makeup of the county was 94.04% White, 2.18% Black or African American, 0.43% Native American, 0.36% Asian, 0.03% Pacific Islander, 1.73% from other races, and 1.23% from two or more races. 4.22% of the population were Hispanic or Latino of any race. In terms of ancestry, 17.3% were German, 15.1% were Italian, 11.6% were Swedish, 10.9% were English, 9.3% were Polish, 9.2% were Irish and 5.6% were of American ancestry according to Census 2000. 93.0% spoke English and 3.8% Spanish as their first language.

Of the 54,515 households 30.50% had children under the age of 18 living with them, 50.90% were married couples living together, 10.80% had a female householder with no husband present, and 34.00% were non-families. 28.10% of households were one person and 12.60% were one person aged 65 or older. The average household size was 2.45 and the average family size was 2.99.

The age distribution was 24.50% under the age of 18, 10.30% from 18 to 24, 26.30% from 25 to 44, 23.00% from 45 to 64, and 16.00% 65 or older. The median age was 38 years. For every 100 females there were 95.20 males. For every 100 females age 18 and over, there were 92.20 males.

The median household income was $33,458 and the median family income was $41,054. Males had a median income of $32,114 versus $22,214 for females. The per capita income for the county was $16,840. About 9.70% of families and 13.80% of the population were below the poverty line, including 19.30% of those under age 18 and 8.20% of those age 65 or over.

As of the 2010 census, there were 134,905 people in the county. The population density was 127 people per square mile (49 people/km^{2}). The racial makeup of the county was 92.57% (124,875 people) white, 2.37% (3,197 people) African-American, 0.51% (688 people) Asian, 0.51% (689 people) Native American/Alaskan, 0.03% (34 people) Native Hawaiian/Pacific Islander, 1.98% (2,669 people) other, and 2.04% (2,751 people) two or more races. The Hispanic/Latino population of any race was 6.11% (8,241 people). In terms of ancestry, 25% were German, 16% were Italian, 12.8% were Swedish, 16% were English, 10.6% were Polish, 14.9% were Irish and 3.2% were of American ancestry according to the 2010 Census. 92.9% spoke English and 4.1% Spanish as their first language.

The age distribution was 21.83% of the population under the age of 18, 3.82% (5,155 people) ages 18 and 19, 7.50% (10,113 people) ages 20–24, 10.37% (13,985 people) ages 25–34, 18.83% (25,406 people) ages 35–49, 21.07% (28,419 people) ages 50–64, and 16.59% (22,381 people) over the age of 65. Of the population, 49.3% (66,509 people) were male and 50.7% (68,396 people) were female.

== Government and politics ==
All of the county is in the 150th New York State Assembly district, represented by Andy Goodell, and the New York State Senate 57th district represented by George Borrello. The entire county is within the bounds of New York's 23rd congressional district which is represented by Nick Langworthy.

The 2012 redistricting process moved all of Chautauqua County into Goodell's assembly district, while the county also rejoined the former 31st (renumbered again as the 23rd) congressional district along with Cattaraugus and Allegany Counties. Prior to 2013, the county was part of New York's 27th congressional district. Prior to 2003, the county was part of New York's 31st congressional district, but it was controversially redistricted out of that district and into what was the 27th, and was replaced in the 29th district (the old 31st) by Rochester suburbs that had never before been part of the district. Chautauqua County, at the same time, joined southern Erie County and portions of the City of Buffalo in the 27th, areas that had also never been in the same district with each other. In both cases, the suburban additions had significantly more Democratic populations than before, leading to Democrats winning both districts, which led to accusations of cracking-based gerrymandering.

Though the Republican Party has historically been dominant in Chautauqua County politics, the county had been a perfect bellwether county from 1980 to 2008, correctly voting for the winner of each presidential election in all eight elections during that time. However, in 2012, it voted for Republican Mitt Romney even as Democrat Barack Obama won re-election, marking its first miss since 1976. In 2016 the county reverted back to being solidly Republican, as Donald Trump won the county by the largest margin since Ronald Reagan in 1984.

United States presidential election results for Chautauqua County, New York
Year	Republican		Democratic		Third party(ies)	
Year	No.	%	No.	%	No.	%
1884	10,670	60.96%	5,861	33.49%	971	5.55%
1888	12,108	62.92%	6,178	32.10%	958	4.98%
1892	11,595	58.37%	6,397	32.20%	1,874	9.43%
1896	14,325	66.61%	6,581	30.60%	601	2.79%
1900	15,318	67.62%	6,660	29.40%	674	2.98%
1904	15,891	69.77%	5,295	23.25%	1,589	6.98%
1908	15,739	65.62%	6,158	25.67%	2,088	8.71%
1912	7,899	36.16%	4,954	22.68%	8,991	41.16%
1916	14,782	62.19%	7,153	30.09%	1,835	7.72%
1920	27,618	71.57%	6,781	17.57%	4,188	10.85%
1924	29,757	71.25%	5,560	13.31%	6,447	15.44%
1928	38,220	72.68%	13,223	25.15%	1,141	2.17%
1932	30,479	60.62%	16,914	33.64%	2,882	5.73%
1936	30,435	55.41%	23,283	42.39%	1,209	2.20%
1940	35,536	62.00%	21,524	37.55%	256	0.45%
1944	32,824	59.49%	22,086	40.03%	264	0.48%
1948	29,969	57.47%	20,683	39.67%	1,492	2.86%
1952	42,043	64.14%	23,427	35.74%	79	0.12%
1956	44,149	68.54%	20,269	31.46%	0	0.00%
1960	37,836	57.30%	28,143	42.62%	52	0.08%
1964	19,069	30.73%	42,924	69.17%	63	0.10%
1968	28,561	48.82%	26,431	45.18%	3,515	6.01%
1972	37,158	58.44%	26,253	41.29%	172	0.27%
1976	33,730	54.90%	27,447	44.68%	259	0.42%
1980	30,081	51.20%	22,871	38.93%	5,804	9.88%
1984	39,597	63.13%	22,986	36.65%	141	0.22%
1988	31,642	54.68%	25,814	44.61%	411	0.71%
1992	21,222	33.80%	22,645	36.07%	18,922	30.14%
1996	21,261	37.77%	26,831	47.67%	8,198	14.56%
2000	29,064	49.49%	27,016	46.01%	2,642	4.50%
2004	32,434	53.22%	27,257	44.72%	1,253	2.06%
2008	28,579	48.60%	29,129	49.54%	1,094	1.86%
2012	27,971	52.92%	23,812	45.05%	1,069	2.02%
2016	31,594	58.25%	19,091	35.20%	3,549	6.54%
2020	34,853	58.77%	23,087	38.93%	1,364	2.30%
2024	34,528	60.53%	22,085	38.71%	433	0.76%

Chautauqua County is one of nineteen “charter counties” in New York, which grants the county greater leeway in conducting its own affairs. A board of supervisors governed Chautauqua County until 1975, when a new county charter went into effect with provisions for a county executive and a 13-seat county legislature. The county council currently consists of 19 members each elected from single-member districts. As of 2024, there are 14 Republicans and 5 Democrats.

Chautauqua County Executives
Name	Party	Term
Joseph Gerace	Democratic	January 1, 1975 – May 10, 1983
David Dawson (acting)	Democratic	May 10, 1983 – November 25, 1983
John A. Glenzer	Republican	November 25, 1983 – December 31, 1989
Andrew W. Goodell	Republican	January 1, 1990 – December 31, 1997
Mark W. Thomas	Democratic	January 1, 1998 – December 31, 2005
Gregory J. Edwards	Republican	January 1, 2006 – November 15, 2013
Stephen M. Abdella (acting)	UKN	November 15, 2013 – December 31, 2013
Vincent W. Horrigan	Republican	January 1, 2014 – December 31, 2017
George M. Borrello	Republican	January 1, 2018 – November 26, 2019
Stephen M. Abdella (acting)	UKN	November 26, 2019 – December 31, 2019
Paul J. Wendel	Republican	January 1, 2020 – present

Chautauqua County Legislature
District	Legislator	Party
1	Kevin Muldowney	Republican
2	Robert Bankoski	Democratic
3	Bob Scudder	Republican
4	Christine Starks	Democratic
5	Terry Niebel	Republican
6	Thomas R. Harmon	Republican
7	Mark Odell	Republican
8	Pierre Chagnon Chairman	Republican
9	Chuck Nazzaro	Democratic
10	Ken Lawton	Republican
11	Robert Whitney	Democratic
12	Elisabeth Rankin	Republican
13	Paul Whitford	Democratic
14	Daniel Pavlock	Republican
15	Lisa Vanstrom	Republican
16	John Davis	Republican
17	Frank Jay Gould	Republican
18	Bill Ward	Republican
19	John Hemmer	Republican

=== New York State Assembly ===
Prior to changes in representation of the New York State Assembly, each county had a given number of representatives. The following were representatives of Chautauqua County.

Name	Term start	Term end	Legislatures	Notes
Ebenezer Walden	July 1, 1811	June 30, 1812	35th	Represented Cattaraugus, Chautauqua, and Niagara Counties
Jonas Williams	July 1, 1812	June 30, 1814	36th, 37th	Represented Cattaraugus, Chautauqua, and Niagara Counties
Joseph McClure	July 1, 1814	June 30, 1815	38th	Represented Cattaraugus, Chautauqua, and Niagara Counties
Elias Osborn	July 1, 1815	June 30, 1816	39th	Represented Cattaraugus, Chautauqua, and Niagara Counties
Jediah Prendergast; Richard Smith	July 1, 1816	June 30, 1817	40th	Represented Cattaraugus, Chautauqua, and Niagara Counties
Robert Fleming; Isaac Phelps	July 1, 1817	June 30, 1818	41st	Represented Cattaraugus, Chautauqua, and Niagara Counties
Philo Orton; Isaac Phelps	July 1, 1818	June 30, 1819	42nd	Represented Cattaraugus, Chautauqua, and Niagara Counties
Elial T. Foote; Oliver Forward	July 1, 1819	June 30, 1820	43rd	Represented Cattaraugus, Chautauqua, and Niagara Counties
Jediah Prendergast; William Hotchkiss	July 1, 1820	June 30, 1821	44th	Represented Cattaraugus, Chautauqua, and Niagara Counties
Thomas B. Campbell	July 1, 1821	December 31, 1822	45th	Represented Cattaraugus, Chautauqua, Erie, and Niagara Counties
David Eason	July 1, 1821	January 5, 1822	45th	Represented Cattaraugus, Chautauqua, Erie, and Niagara Counties
Isaac Phelps	January 5, 1822	December 31, 1822	45th	Represented Cattaraugus, Chautauqua, Erie, and Niagara Counties
James Mullett Jr.	January 1, 1823	December 31, 1824	46th, 47th	First to only represent Chautauqua County
Nathan Mixer	January 1, 1825	December 31, 1825	48th	
Elial T. Foote	January 1, 1826	December 31, 1827	49th, 50th	
Samuel A. Brown	January 1, 1827	December 31, 1827	50th	
Nathaniel Fenton	January 1, 1828	December 31, 1828	51st	
Nathan Mixer	January 1, 1828	December 31, 1829	51st, 52nd	
Abner Hazeltine	January 1, 1829	December 31, 1830	52nd, 53rd	
Squire White	January 1, 1830	December 31, 1832	53rd, 54th, 55th	
John Birdsall	January 1, 1831	December 31, 1831	54th	
Theron Bly	January 1, 1832	December 31, 1832	55th	
Nathaniel Gray	January 1, 1833	December 31, 1833	56th	
Alvin Plumb	January 1, 1833	December 31, 1833	56th	

== Education ==
Jamestown Community College has two campuses in the county at Jamestown and Dunkirk. The State University of New York at Fredonia is located in the northern part of the county. Jamestown Business College offered two year degrees, certificates, and a four-year degree in Jamestown, prior to its decision to cease new enrollments in 2024.

== Healthcare ==
The Northern region of Chautauqua County is served by Brooks Memorial Hospital in Dunkirk, New York. Most of Chautauqua County is served by UPMC Chautauqua in Jamestown, New York. The rural southwest region is served by Corry Memorial Hospital in Corry, Pennsylvania. Westfield, New York is home to the Westfield Memorial Hospital. Westfield Memorial Hospital is a Rural Emergency Hospital without an inpatient department. The closest Trauma centers to Chautauqua County are UPMC Hamot, the Level II Trauma Center for Erie, Pennsylvania, and Erie County Medical Center, the Level I Trauma Center in Buffalo, New York.

== Communities ==
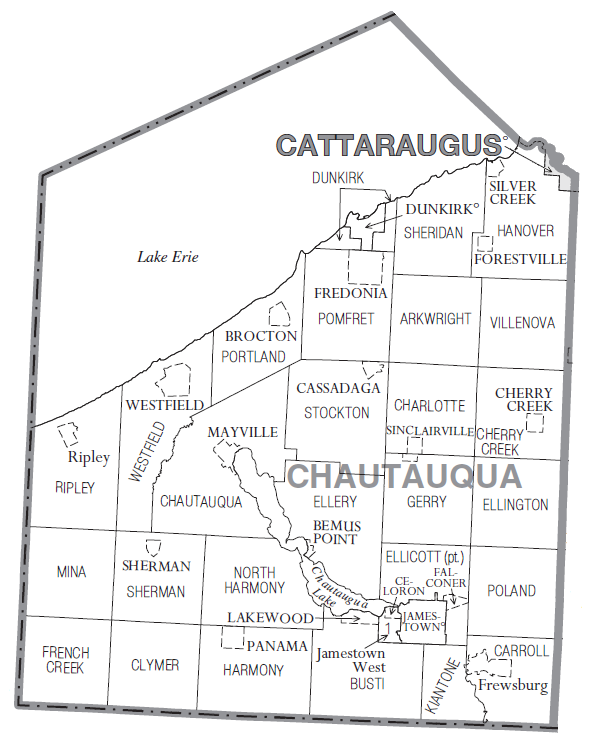

#	Location	Population	Type	Area
1	Jamestown	31,146	City	Southeast
2	Dunkirk	12,563	City	Lake Shore
3	Fredonia	11,230	Village	Lake Shore
4	Westfield	3,224	Village	Lake Shore
5	Lakewood	3,002	Village	Southeast
6	Silver Creek	2,656	Village	Lake Shore
7	Falconer	2,420	Village	Southeast
8	Ripley	2,415	CDP	Lake Shore
9	Jamestown West	2,408	CDP	Southeast
10	Frewsburg	1,906	CDP	Southeast
11	†Mayville	1,711	Village	Southwest
12	Brocton	1,486	Village	Lake Shore
13	Celoron	1,112	Village	Southeast
14	Sherman	730	Village	Southwest
15	††Forestville	697	Hamlet/CDP	Lake Shore
16	Sunset Bay	660	CDP	Lake Shore
17	Cassadaga	634	Village	Southeast
18	Sinclairville	588	Village	Center-East
19	Panama	479	Village	Southwest
20	Kennedy	465	CDP	Southeast
21	††Cherry Creek	461	Hamlet/CDP	Center-East
22	Busti	391	CDP	Southeast
23	Bemus Point	364	Village	Southeast
24	Chautauqua	191	CDP	Southwest

† - county seat

†† - former village

=== Towns ===
- Arkwright
- Busti
- Carroll
- Charlotte
- Chautauqua
- Cherry Creek
- Clymer
- Dunkirk
- Ellery
- Ellicott
- Ellington
- French Creek
- Gerry
- Hanover
- Harmony
- Kiantone
- Mina
- North Harmony
- Poland
- Pomfret
- Portland
- Ripley
- Sheridan
- Sherman
- Stockton
- Villenova
- Westfield

=== Other hamlets ===
- Ashville
- Findley Lake
- Forestville
- Hamlet
- Irving
- Laona
- Lily Dale
- Maple Springs
- Van Buren Bay

=== Indian reservation ===
- Cattaraugus Reservation

=== Unorganized territory ===
- Chautauqua Lake

== In literature ==
Joyce Carol Oates' 1996 novel, We Were the Mulvaneys is set in rural Chautauqua County, near the fictional town of Mt. Ephraim.

== See also ==
- List of counties in New York
- National Register of Historic Places listings in Chautauqua County, New York
- Chautauqua County, Kansas
