= Pomfret, New York =

- Town
- Location in Chautauqua County and New York state

- Location within New York Location within the United States
- Coordinates: 42°25′2″N 79°21′2″W
- Country: United States
- State: New York
- County: Chautauqua

Government
  - Type: Town Council
  - Town Supervisor: Daniel Pacos (D)
  - Town Council: Members' List: • Ann R. Eckman (R); • Christopher H. Schaeffer (D); • Brett M. Christy (D); • John Sedota (R)

Area
  - Total: 44.19 sq mi (114.45 km^{2})
  - Land: 43.85 sq mi (113.58 km^{2})
  - Water: 0.34 sq mi (0.87 km^{2})
- Elevation: 994 ft (303 m)

Population (2020)
  - Total: 13,236
  - Estimate (2021): 13,150
  - Density: 324.8/sq mi (125.41/km^{2})
- Time zone: UTC-5 (Eastern (EST))
  - Summer (DST): UTC-4 (EDT)
- ZIP Codes: 14063 (Fredonia); 14048 (Dunkirk); 14718 (Cassadaga); 14752 (Lily Dale); 14784 (Stockton)
- FIPS code: 36-013-58981
- GNIS feature ID: 0979382
- Website: townofpomfretny.gov

Pomfret is a town in Chautauqua County, New York, United States. The population was 13,236 at the 2020 census. The town lies in the north-central part of the county, south of Dunkirk, and includes the village of Fredonia.

== History ==
The area was first settled around 1806. The town of Pomfret was formed in 1808 from the town of Chautauqua, being the first partition of Chautauqua after the county was formed. Pomfret later lost substantial parts of its territory during the formation of five new towns of the county.

== Geography ==
According to the United States Census Bureau, Pomfret has a total area of 44.2 square miles (114.4 km^{2}), of which 43.9 square miles (113.6 km^{2}) is land and 0.35 square miles (0.9 km^{2}), or 0.76%, is water.

The northwestern corner of the town borders Lake Erie.

The New York State Thruway (Interstate 90) and US 20 pass through the town. NY 60 is a major north–south highway, and NY 5 runs along the shore of Lake Erie.

=== Adjacent towns and areas ===
- Lake Erie
- Dunkirk town;
- Dunkirk city
- Stockton
- Portland

== Demographics ==
Historical population
Census	Pop.	Note	%±
1820	2,306		—
1830	3,386		46.8%
1840	4,566		34.8%
1850	4,483		−1.8%
1860	4,293		−4.2%
1870	4,306		0.3%
1880	4,551		5.7%
1890	5,479		20.4%
1900	6,313		15.2%
1910	7,309		15.8%
1920	7,973		9.1%
1930	8,062		1.1%
1940	7,782		−3.5%
1950	9,596		23.3%
1960	11,459		19.4%
1970	13,890		21.2%
1980	14,992		7.9%
1990	14,224		−5.1%
2000	14,703		3.4%
2010	14,965		1.8%
2020	13,236		−11.6%
2021 (est.)	13,150		−0.6%
U.S. Decennial Census

As of the census of 2000, there were 14,703 people, 5,105 households, and 2,971 families residing in the town. The population density was 334.9 inhabitants per square mile (129.3/km^{2}). There were 5,558 housing units at an average density of 126.6 per square mile (48.9/km^{2}). The racial makeup of the town was 95.28% White, 2.07% African American, 0.33% Native American, 0.86% Asian, 0.02% Pacific Islander, 0.64% from other races, and 0.80% from two or more races. Hispanic or Latino of any race were 2.33% of the population.

There were 5,105 households, out of which 26.6% had children under the age of 18 living with them, 45.9% were married couples living together, 9.2% had a female householder with no husband present, and 41.8% were non-families. 28.5% of all households were made up of individuals, and 12.1% had someone living alone who was 65 years of age or older. The average household size was 2.39 and the average family size was 2.94.

In the town, the population was spread out, with 18.2% under the age of 18, 30.7% from 18 to 24, 19.9% from 25 to 44, 18.8% from 45 to 64, and 12.3% who were 65 years of age or older. The median age was 26 years. For every 100 females, there were 87.6 males. For every 100 females age 18 and over, there were 83.9 males.

The median income for a household in the town was $35,444, and the median income for a family was $47,252. Males had a median income of $35,669 versus $25,997 for females. The per capita income for the town was $16,506. About 4.6% of families and 15.9% of the population were below the poverty line, including 9.1% of those under age 18 and 7.4% of those age 65 or over.

As of the Census of 2010, there were 14,965 people (an increase of 262 people or 1.78%) and 5,296 households (and increase of 191 households or 3.74%) within the town. The population density was 340.9 inhabitants per square mile (131.6/km^{2}). The racial makeup of the town was: 93.52% (13,995 people) white; 2.26% (338 people) African-American; 1.37% (205 people) Asian; 0.36% (54 people) Native American/Alaskan; 0.04% (6 people) Native Hawaiian/Pacific Islander; 1.08% (161 people) other; and 1.38% (206 people) two or more races. Out of the population of any race, 4.06% (607 people) were Hispanic/Latino.

The population of the town was spread out, with 14.75% (2,208 people) under the age of 18, 12.91% (1,932 people) ages 18 and 19, 21.78% (3,259 people) ages 20–24, 7.54% (1,128 people) ages 25–34, 13.75% (2,057 people) ages 35–49, 16.53% (2,473 people) ages 50–64, and 12.75% (1,908 people) over the age of 65. Males made up 47.50% (7,108 people) of the total population, and females made up 52.50% (7,857 people) of the total population.

== Communities and locations in the Town of Pomfret ==
- Bear Lake – A small lake west of Lily Dale, partly in the town.
- Canadaway Creek – A stream flowing northward through the town toward Lake Erie.
- Cassadaga Lake (or Cassadaga Lakes) – A lake composed of two large sections joined by a narrow channel. The northern large section is in Pomfret, and the southern is in the town of Stockton.
- Cordova – A hamlet west of Fredonia on County Road 78.
- Fredonia – The village of Fredonia is on the northern town border and has a population of 11,230, or 75% of the town population.
- Fredonia Reservoir – A lake intersected by Canadaway Creek.
- Greencrest – A lakeside hamlet on the shore of Lake Erie, partly in Pomfret.
- Lamberton – A hamlet located on Route 20 in the northern part of the town.
- Laona – A hamlet southeast of Fredonia on NY Route 60.
- Lily Dale – Lily Dale is a center of Spiritualism and borders the village of Cassadaga and the north end of Cassadaga Lake.
- Mud Lake – A pond east of Cassadaga Lake.
- Nortons Switch – A location in the western part of the town.
- Reed Corners – A hamlet east of Fredonia at the junction of US 20 and NY 60.
- Shumla – A hamlet on County Road 72 by the eastern town line.
- Van Buren Bay – A lakeside hamlet on the shore of Lake Erie on the shore of Van Buren Bay and on NY 5.

== Notable people ==
- Clarence Clough Buel, editor, author, born in Laona
- Tommy Hartung, artist lives and works in Fredonia
- Joel Hills Johnson (1802–1883), inventor, Mormon pioneer, published poet and gospel hymn writer, politician and judge
- Justus Smith Stearns, businessman, Michigan Secretary of State
