= List of county routes in Chautauqua County, New York =

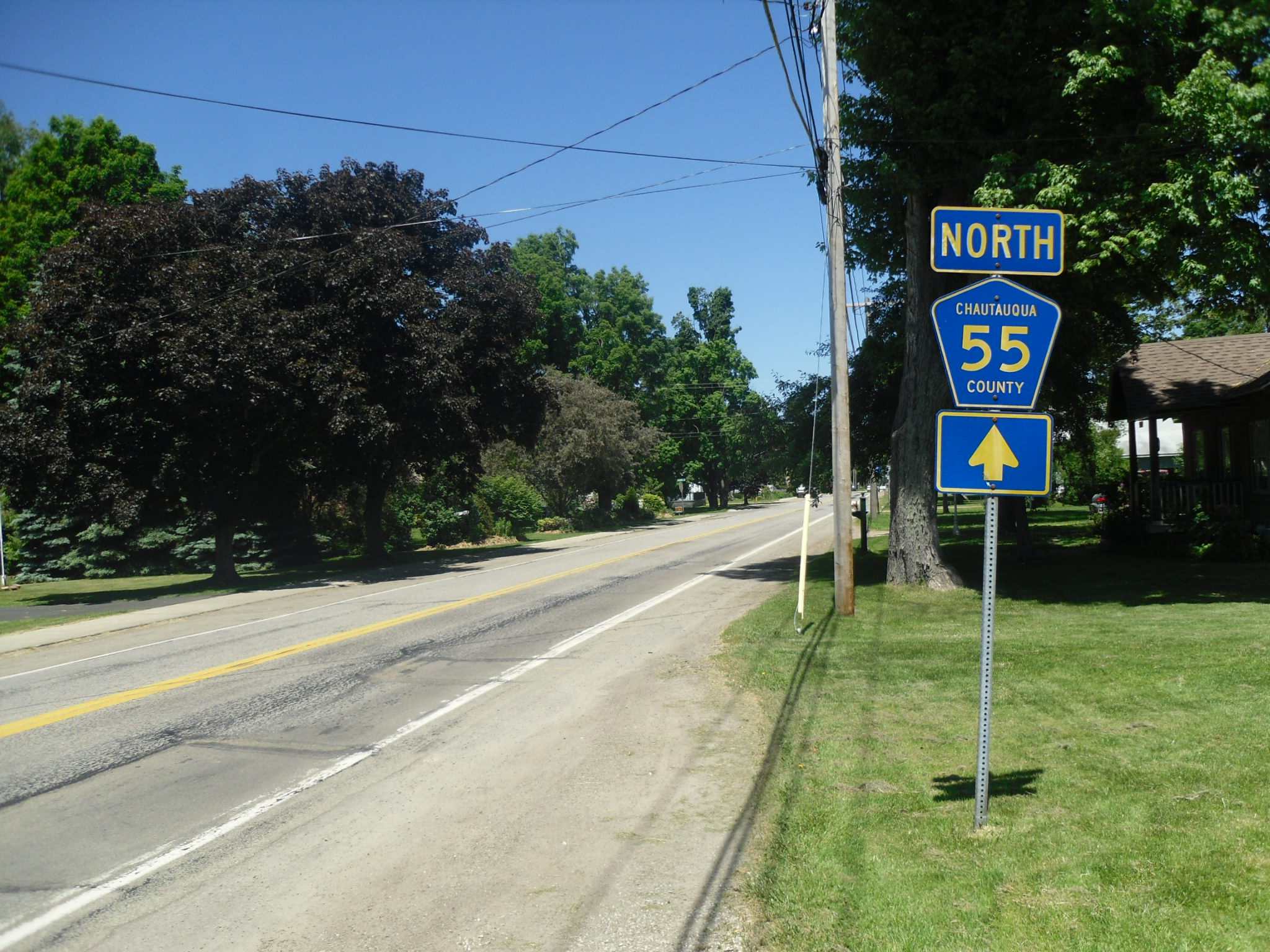
- Example of signage in Chautauqua County, with CR 55 in Carroll.

Highway names
- Interstates: Interstate X (I-X)
- US Highways: U.S. Route X (US X)
- State: New York State Route X (NY X)
- County: County Route X (CR X)

System links
- New York Highways; Interstate; US; State; Reference; Parkways

County routes in Chautauqua County, New York, are signed with the Manual on Uniform Traffic Control Devices-standard yellow-on-blue pentagon route marker. Even numbered routes are west–east roads, while odd numbered routes are south–north roads. One exception is the north–south County Route 380 (CR 380), part of which was once New York State Route 380 (NY 380). The numbers increase roughly from southwest to northeast across the county. All roads maintained by Chautauqua County are assigned a county highway number; this number is unsigned. Each county route comprises one or more county highways; however, not all county highways are part of a signed county route.

== County routes ==
Route	Length (mi)	Length (km)	From	Via	To	Notes
CR 1	4.27	6.87	NY 426 in French Creek	Mann Road (CH 615)	NY 426 / NY 430 in Mina	
CR 2	3.88	6.24	NY 426 in French Creek	Brownell Road (CH 21)	CR 15 in Clymer	
CR 3	8.18	13.16	NY 426 / NY 430 in Mina	North and Miller roads (CH 606)	Pennsylvania state line in Ripley	
CR 4	8.51	13.70	NY 426 in French Creek	French Creek–Mina, Marks Corners, French Creek, Sherman–Clymer, and Alder Bottom roads (CH 322F and CH 322)	NY 76 in Sherman	
CR 6	6.52	10.49	Pennsylvania state line	North East–Sherman Road in Ripley (CH 64 and CH 303)	NY 76	
CR 7	3.61	5.81	CR 4 in French Creek	French–Creek Mina Road (CH 622)	NY 430 in Mina	
CR 8	3.82	6.15	NY 474	Nazareth Road in Clymer (CH 624)	CR 23	
CR 9	3.66	5.89	CR 6	South Ripley–Wattlesburg Road in Ripley (CH 64)	NY 76	
CR 10	7.64	12.30	CR 15 in Clymer	Ravlin Hill, Clymer Center, Kings Corners, and Rock Hill roads (CH 613)	NY 474 in Panama	
CR 11	3.57	5.75	CR 4	Marks Corners Road in Mina (CH 625)	NY 430	
CR 12	6.68	10.75	CR 33 in Harmony	Niobe and Kortwright roads (CH 27M, CH 304 and CH 630)	CR 69 in Busti	
CR 13	3.06	4.92	NY 430 in Mina	Camp and North Mina roads (CH 622N)	CR 6 in Ripley	
CR 14			CR 33 in Panama	Button Valley Road (CH 305)	CR 35 in Harmony	Former number
CR 15	11.96	19.25	Pennsylvania state line in Clymer	Plank and Clymer–Sherman roads and Cornish and Hart streets (CH 321 and CH 65)	NY 76 / NY 430 in Sherman	
CR 16	3.53	5.68	CR 33	Stow Road in North Harmony (CH 631)	NY 394	
CR 18	8.26	13.29	NY 76 in Sherman	Park Street and Sherman–Stedman and Magnolia–Stedman roads (CH 302)	NY 394 in North Harmony	
CR 19	5.44	8.75	NY 474 in Clymer	Clymer Hill Road (CH 636)	CR 15 in Sherman	
CR 21	10.40	16.74	NY 76 in Westfield	Sherman Road and Chestnut Street (CH 88 and CH 74)	US 20 in Westfield village	
CR 22	3.68	5.92	NY 76 in Westfield	Nettle Hill Road (CH 333)	NY 430 in Chautauqua	
CR 23	5.28	8.50	Pennsylvania state line in Clymer	Town Line Road (CH 628)	NY 474 in Harmony	
CR 24	1.16	1.87	NY 5	Hawley Street in Westfield village (CH 56)	NY 394	
CR 25	6.37	10.25	CR 18 in Sherman	Morris Road and Morris Street (CH 301 and CH 84)	NY 394 in Mayville	
CR 26	5.05	8.13	Forest Avenue (NY 952P) / CR 45 / CR 380 in Busti	Mill Street and Donelson and Waite roads (CH 111 and CH 643)	CR 49 in Kiantone	
CR 27	1.60	2.57	NY 430 in Mayville	Honeysette Road (CH 642)	CR 29 in Chautauqua	
CR 29	7.12	11.46	NY 430 in Chautauqua	Plank Road and Academy Street (CH 308 and CH 87)	US 20 in Westfield village	
CR 30	8.35	13.44	NY 474 in Harmony	Baker Street and Newland Avenue (CH 332)	Forest Avenue (NY 952P) in Jamestown	
CR 31	2.22	3.57	CR 29 in Westfield	Felton Road (CH 334)	US 20 in Portland	
CR 32	5.47	8.80	CR 43 in North Harmony	Hunt Road (CH 82)	Jamestown city line in Ellicott	
CR 33	15.23	24.51	Pennsylvania state line in Harmony (becomes PA 958)	South and North streets (CH 27C, CH 76, CH 53 and CH 34)	NY 394 in Chautauqua	
CR 34	5.92	9.53	US 62 / CR 55	Frew Run Road and Frew Run Road Extension in Carroll (CH 80, CH 619 and CH 336)	Cattaraugus County line (becomes CR 89)	
CR 35	11.30	18.19	CR 12	Blockville–Watts Flats Road in Harmony (CH 304, CH 58 and CH 316)	CR 33	
CR 36	3.63	5.84	US 62	Ivory Road in Carroll (CH 318)	Cattaraugus County line (becomes CR 33)	
CR 37	4.59	7.39	CR 58 in Chautauqua	Beech Hill and Frances roads (CH 626)	CR 380 in Stockton	
CR 38	2.73	4.39	NY 394	Whitley Avenue and Steele, Harrison, and Willard streets in Jamestown (CH 106)	Jamestown city line	
CR 40	2.44	3.93	NY 394 in Jamestown	Buffalo Street and Buffalo Street Extension (CH 105)	CR 380 in Ellicott	
CR 42	3.94	6.34	NY 394	Poland Center and Mud Creek roads in Poland (CH 325)	Cattaraugus County line (becomes CR 8)	
CR 43	2.38	3.83	CR 30 in Busti	Maple Avenue (CH 37, CH 68 and CH 83)	NY 394 in North Harmony	
CR 44	7.19	11.57	NY 430 / NY 954J in Ellery	Bemus Point–Ellery and Salisbury roads (CH 13 and CH 641)	CR 380 in Ellicott	
CR 45	4.24	6.82	Forest Avenue (NY 952P) / CR 26 / CR 380 in Busti	Southwestern Drive (CH 328)	NY 394 in Lakewood	
CR 46	3.89	6.26	NY 430	Hayner Road in Ellery (CH 633)	CR 44	
CR 47	3.06	4.92	CR 28 in Busti	South Main Street Extension and South Main Street (CH 125)	NY 60 in Jamestown	
CR 48	3.81	6.13	CR 44	Towerville Road in Ellery (CH 646)	CR 59	
CR 49	4.99	8.03	US 62	Kiantone Road in Kiantone (CH 77 and CH 52)	NY 60	
CR 50	8.14	13.10	NY 60 in Gerry	Gerry–Ellington Road, West Hill Road, and West Main Street (CH 603)	US 62 / CR 66 in Ellington	
CR 51	2.32	3.73	NY 60 in Kiantone	Martin Road (CH 341)	NY 60 in Jamestown	
CR 52	8.51	13.70	NY 430 in Chautauqua	Springbrook and Pickard Hill roads (CH 314)	CR 66 / CR 380 in Ellery	
CR 53	4.11	6.61	Pennsylvania state line	Warren Road and Water Street in Carroll (CH 8139)	US 62	Former routing of US 62
CR 54	6.98	11.23	NY 430 in Chautauqua	Centralia–Hartfield Road (CH 127 and CH 86)	CR 57 / CR 380 in Stockton	
CR 55	4.41	7.10	US 62 / CR 34 in Carroll	Falconer Street (CH 317)	CR 380 in Poland	
CR 56	1.83	2.95	CR 380 in Stockton	Bloomer Road (CH 35 and CH 31)	CR 66 in Gerry	
CR 57	10.31	16.59	NY 430 in Ellery	Dutch Hollow and Ellery–Centralia roads (CH 57 and CH 70)	CR 54 / CR 380 in Stockton	
CR 58	10.71	17.24	NY 430 in Chautauqua	Stockton Road, West Railroad Avenue, Cassadaga–Stockton Road, and Maple Avenue (CH 127 and CH 310)	NY 60 in Cassadaga	Part northeast of CR 380 was formerly NY 424
CR 59	6.06	9.75	NY 430 in Ellicott	Town Line Road (CH 609)	CR 380 in Gerry	Runs along eastern town line of Ellery
CR 61	4.73	7.61	NY 60 in Jamestown	West Oak Hill Road (CH 120)	CR 59 in Ellicott	
CR 63	1.51	2.43	CR 380	Ross Mills Road in Ellicott (CH 605)	CR 65	
CR 64	5.98	9.62	CR 66 / CR 77 in Sinclairville	East Avenue and Edson and Bates roads (CH 102 and CH 617)	CR 66 in Ellington	
CR 65	5.47	8.80	NY 394 in Ellicott	Gerry–Levant Road (CH 16 and CH 604)	NY 60 / CR 50 in Gerry	
CR 66	13.34	21.47	CR 52 / CR 380 in Ellery	Sinclair Drive, Main, Park, and Kent streets, and Thornton Road (CH 314, CH 31, CH 49D, CH 133, CH 85, CH 62 and CH 33)	CR 50 in Ellington	Overlaps with CR 77 in Sinclairville
CR 67	3.46	5.57	NY 394 in Poland	Waterford Hill, Watkins, and Bush roads (CH 602)	US 62 in Ellington	Northernmost 0.12 miles (0.19 km) overlap with CR 64 along Cattaraugus County line
CR 68	1.68	2.70	CR 85 in Cherry Creek	West Road and Center Street (CH 29 and CH 62V)	NY 83 in Cherry Creek village	
CR 69	6.95	11.18	Pennsylvania state line (becomes PA 69)	Big Tree Road in Busti (CH 315 and CH 75)	NY 394	
CR 70	2.06	3.32	NY 83 in Cherry Creek village	Southside Avenue and Cherry Creek–Leon Road (CH 313)	Cattaraugus County line in Cherry Creek (becomes CR 6)	Unmarked.
CR 71	6.47	10.41	CR 380 in South Stockton	Putnam Road (CH 342)	CR 58 in Cassadaga	
CR 72	9.93	15.98	NY 60 in Cassadaga	Bard and Cassadaga roads (CH 312)	NY 83 in Villenova	
CR 73	8.46	13.62	CR 380 in Stockton	Fredonia–Stockton Road and Water Street (CH 610)	CH 140 in Fredonia	
CR 74	4.37	7.03	NY 5 in Portland	Berry Road and Berry and Chestnut streets (CH 618)	US 20 in Fredonia	
CR 75	5.01	8.06	CR 66 / CR 77 in Sinclairville	Water Street and Nelson and Pickett roads (CH 133)	NY 60 in Stockton	
CR 77	8.70	14.00	NY 60 in Gerry	Jamestown, Main, and Park streets and Center and Rood roads (CH 133, CH 49 and CH 326)	CR 72 in Arkwright	Overlaps with CR 66 in Sinclairville
CR 78	3.46	5.57	NY 5 in Portland	Van Buren Road and Matteson Street (CH 73)	CH 98B / CH 113 in Fredonia	
CR 79	11.47	18.46	CR 72 in Arkwright	Center Road and Indian Trail (CH 629, CH 319, CH 331 and CH 91)	NY 5 in Sheridan	
CR 80			Dunkirk city line in Dunkirk	New Road (CH 323)	US 20 in Sheridan	Former number
CR 81	6.08	9.78	CR 79 in Sheridan	Whitaker and Roberts roads (CH 319 and CH 136)	NY 5 in Dunkirk	Part between US 20 and Franklin Avenue was formerly part of NY 39
CR 82	4.97	8.00	NY 5 in Dunkirk	Middle Road (CH 121M and CH 148)	CR 79 in Sheridan	
CR 84	5.22	8.40	US 20 in Sheridan	King Road (CH 320)	CR 85 in Hanover	
CR 85	22.34	35.95	CR 66 in Cherry Creek	Erwin, Farrington Hill, and Creek roads, Water, Pearl, and Center streets, Bennett State Road, and Division and Burgess streets (CH 62, CH 29R, CH 306, CH 307 and CH 141)	US 20 in Silver Creek	Part north of NY 39 was formerly NY 428; overlaps with NY 83 in Arkwright and NY 39 in Forestville (Note: Both overlaps are state-maintained.)
CR 86	2.43	3.91	US 20 in Sheridan	Stebbins Road (CH 90)	CR 89 in Hanover	
CR 87	8.56	13.78	NY 83 / NY 322 in Villenova	Balcom Cross, Danker, Ball Hill, and Prospect roads (CH 103, CH 621 and CH 107)	NY 39 in Forestville	
CR 88	3.08	4.96	CR 93	Versailles and Dennison roads in Hanover (CH 114)	Cattaraugus County line (becomes CR 42)	
CR 89	5.83	9.38	CR 85 in Forestville	Pearl Street and Dennison and Angell roads (CH 123, CH 90 and CH 90A)	CR 95 in Hanover	
CR 91	1.72	2.77	CR 87	Hooker and Buttermilk roads in Villenova (CH 103)	CR 83	
CR 93	14.20	22.85	NY 322 in Villenova	Hanover Road and Hanover Street (CH 30, CH 47, CH 38, CH 5M and CH 5C)	US 20 in Silver Creek	
CR 95	3.78	6.08	CR 93	York and Allegany roads in Hanover (CH 119)	US 20 / NY 5	
CR 380	36.86	59.32	Forest Avenue (NY 952P) / CR 26 / CR 45 in Busti	Busti–Stillwater and Peck Settlement roads, Work Street, and Lake Avenue (CH 18, CH 19, CH 99, CH 71, CH 138, CH 81, CH 132. CH 70, CH 10 and CH 6)	NY 5 in Portland	Discontinuous at US 20; part north of NY 60 was formerly NY 380

== County highways ==
Every county-maintained road is assigned an unsigned county highway number for inventory purposes. The majority of county highways are part of signed county routes; however, some serve as internal designations for county-maintained sections of New York state touring routes while others are not posted with any designation. Those not part of any county routes are listed below.

Route	Length (mi)	Length (km)	From	Via	To	Notes
CH 13	0.59	0.95 (Note: Full length of CH 13 is 2.80 miles (4.51 km).)	CH 128 at Lakeside Drive in Bemus Point	NY 430 (Center Street)	NY 954J in Ellery (becomes CR 44)	
CH 13W	0.33	0.53	CH 13	Meadow Drive and Westman Road in Ellery	Dead end	Formerly part of CH 13
CH 48	1.55	2.49	NY 60 in Cassadaga	Dale Drive and Glasgow Road	Job Corps Drive in Pomfret	
CH 67	2.84	4.57	NY 394 in Ellicott	Dunham, Boulevard, Jones–Gifford, and Fairmount avenues	Sixth Street in Jamestown	
CH 70S	0.06	0.10	CH 70	Spur in Stockton	CH 70	
CH 78	1.29	2.08	Pennsylvania state line	NY 430 in Mina	NY 426	
CH 98B	2.35	3.78	CR 78 / CH 113 in Fredonia	Brigham Road	NY 5 in Dunkirk	
CH 110	3.81	6.13	NY 394 in Busti	Summit Avenue, Lakeside Boulevard, and Jackson and Livingston avenues	CH 67 in Celoron	
CH 112	0.85	1.37	CH 610	Webster Road in Pomfret	Arkwright town line	
CH 113	2.05	3.30	CR 78 / CH 98B in Fredonia	Temple Street and Temple Road	NY 5 in Dunkirk	
CH 121U	0.92	1.48	CR 81	Urban Road in Dunkirk	CR 82	
CH 128	1.36	2.19	CH 13 at Center Street in Bemus Point	NY 430 (Lakeside Drive and Main Street)	0.34 miles (0.55 km) east of I-86 exit 9 in Ellery	
CH 132	0.59	0.95	NY 60 in Ellicott	Van Cobb and Salisbury roads	NY 60 in Gerry	Former routing of NY 60
CH 139	0.95	1.53	CH 67	Bailey Street and Livingston Avenue in Celoron	Jamestown city line	
CH 140	2.27	3.65	NY 60 in Pomfret	Porter Road, Porter Avenue, and Liberty and Water streets	US 20 in Fredonia	Former routing of NY 60
CH 142	0.46	0.74	CH 120	Airport Drive in Ellicott	Chautauqua County-Jamestown Airport	
CH 143	2.42	3.89	CR 38 in Jamestown	Allen Street and Allen Street Extension	CR 380 in Ellicott	
CH 144	1.17	1.88	CR 380	Mason Drive in Ellicott	CH 143	
CH 145	1.09	1.75	CH 155	Millard Fillmore and Vineyard drives in Dunkirk	NY 60	
CH 146	0.84	1.35	CR 30	Baker Street and Barrett Avenue in Jamestown	CR 38	
CH 147	0.74	1.19	Werle Road	Harrington Road in Sheridan	NY 5	
CH 148	1.44	2.32	CR 82 in Dunkirk	Progress Drive and Werle Road	CH 147 in Sheridan	
CH 149	0.62	1.00	CH 148	Chadwick Drive in Sheridan	CH 148	
CH 153	0.52	0.84	NY 60	Talcott Street in Dunkirk	CR 81	
CH 155	1.98	3.19	CH 145	Central Avenue in Dunkirk	NY 5	Former routing of NY 60
CH 161	0.65	1.05	CH 98B	Willowbrook Avenue in Dunkirk	CH 155	
CH 163	0.14	0.23	NY 60	Wright Street in Dunkirk	CH 164	
CH 164	0.33	0.53	Talcott Street	Franklin Avenue in Dunkirk	NY 60	Formerly part of NY 39
CH 171	0.70	1.13	NY 394	Curtis Street in Jamestown	Jamestown city line	
CH 173	0.27	0.43	CR 38	Winsor Street in Jamestown	NY 394	
CH 174	0.22	0.35	CH 173	Chandler Street in Jamestown	CH 143	
CH 175	0.29	0.47	CH 143	Tiffany Avenue in Jamestown	NY 394	
CH 176	0.16	0.26	NY 60	Institute Street in Jamestown	CR 38	
CH 178	0.69	1.11	NY 60	Foote Avenue in Jamestown	NY 394	
CH 211	0.02	0.03	NY 426	Wye connection in French Creek	CR 2	
CH 321A	0.55	0.89	Pennsylvania state line	Clymer–Corry Road in Clymer	CR 15	
CH 340	1.28	2.06	Carlton Avenue in Falconer	Elmwood Avenue and Water Street	NY 394 in Poland	
CH 616	0.36	0.58	NY 60 in Gerry	Sylvester Road	CR 66 in Sinclairville	
CH 647	1.73	2.78	Slide Joslyn Road	Condin Road in Ellery	CR 48	
CH 648	0.13	0.21	NY 394	Peacock Lane in Mayville	Vista Drive	
CH 649	0.24	0.39	CH 144	Precision Way in Ellicott	End of loop	
CH 651	0.63	1.01	CH 98B	Walldorff Street in Dunkirk	CH 155	
CH 731	0.08	0.13	NY 5	North spur in Pomfret	CR 78	
CH 851	0.08	0.13	CR 85	Thornton Road Spur in Cherry Creek	CR 66	
CH 3401	0.01	0.02	New Water Street	Old Water Street in Ellicott	Dead end	

== See also ==
- County routes in New York
