= Charlotte, New York =

- Town
- Location within Chautauqua County and New York state

- Location within New York Location within the United States
- Coordinates: 42°17′41″N 79°14′27″W
- Country: United States
- State: New York
- County: Chautauqua

Government
  - Type: Town council
  - Town supervisor: Kenneth W. Bochmann (D)
  - Town council: Members' list: • Henry D. Harper, Jr. (R); • Varsi A. Peterson (R); • Daniel W. Pavlock (R); • vacant

Area
  - Total: 36.42 sq mi (94.34 km^{2})
  - Land: 36.42 sq mi (94.34 km^{2})
  - Water: 0 sq mi (0 km^{2})
- Elevation: 1,540 ft (470 m)

Population (2020)
  - Total: 1,521
  - Estimate (2021): 1,540
  - Density: 45.8/sq mi (17.67/km^{2})
- Time zone: UTC-5 (Eastern (EST))
  - Summer (DST): UTC-4 (EDT)
- ZIP Codes: 14782 (Sinclairville); 14718 (Cassadaga); 14723 (Cherry Creek)
- FIPS code: 36-013-13860
- GNIS feature ID: 0978811
- Website: www.charlotteny.gov

Charlotte is a town in Chautauqua County, New York, United States. As of the 2020 census, the town population was 1,521. Charlotte is centrally located in the county, north of Jamestown and south of Dunkirk.

== History ==
The area was first settled circa 1809. The town of Charlotte was founded in 1829 from a division of the town of Gerry. In 1900, the population was 1,406.

In April 1995, a large tire fire occurred at the Hornburg tire disposal facility located along Route 60 in Charlotte, just outside the village of Sinclairville. The fire continued to burn until July 1995 and forced the evacuation of local residents and the temporary closure of a nearby school.

== Geography ==
According to the United States Census Bureau, the town has a total area of 36.4 square miles (94.4 km^{2}), all land.

New York State Route 60 is a major north-south route near the west town line.

Mill Creek flows southwest through the town.

== Notable people ==
- Columbus Caldwell, Wisconsin politician
- Jonathan Child, first mayor of Rochester, New York
- Henry H. Straight, educator and college president
- Charles L. Webster, Mark Twain's business manager

== Adjacent towns and areas ==
(Clockwise)

- Arkwright
- Cherry Creek
- Gerry
- Stockton

== Demographics ==
Historical population
Census	Pop.	Note	%±
1830	886		—
1840	1,428		61.2%
1850	1,718		20.3%
1860	1,711		−0.4%
1870	1,682		−1.7%
1880	1,667		−0.9%
1890	1,441		−13.6%
1900	1,400		−2.8%
1910	1,258		−10.1%
1920	1,173		−6.8%
1930	1,208		3.0%
1940	1,146		−5.1%
1950	1,195		4.3%
1960	1,323		10.7%
1970	1,400		5.8%
1980	1,494		6.7%
1990	1,528		2.3%
2000	1,713		12.1%
2010	1,729		0.9%
2020	1,521		−12.0%
2021 (est.)	1,540		1.2%
U.S. Decennial Census

At the 2000 census there were 1,713 people, 612 households, and 457 families in the town. The population density was 46.9 inhabitants per square mile (18.1/km^{2}). There were 704 housing units at an average density of 19.3 per square mile (7.5/km^{2}). The racial makeup of the town was 98.42% White, 0.18% Native American, 0.29% Asian, 0.35% from other races, and 0.76% from two or more races. 1.40% of the population was Hispanic or Latino of any race. There was 612 households, 36.4% had children under the age of 18 living with them, 60.0% were married couples living together, 9.8% had a female householder with no husband present, and 25.2% were non-families. 20.3% of households were made up of individuals, and 10.9% had someone living alone who was 65 or older. The average household size was 2.80 and the average family size was 3.22.

The age distribution was 29.6% under the age of 18, 7.5% from 18 to 24, 28.3% from 25 to 44, 22.7% from 45 to 64, and 12.0% who was 65 or older. The median age was 35 years. For every 100 females, there were 99.9 males. For every 100 females age 18 and over, there was 99.7 males.

The median household income was $35,192 and the median family income was $40,893. Males had a median income of $32,009 versus $22,734 for females. The per capita income for the town was $15,733. 11.7% of the population and 10.1% of families were below the poverty line. Out of the total population, 13.1% of those under the age of 18 and 17.8% of those 65 and older were living below the poverty line.

At the 2010 census, there were 1,729 people (an increase of 0.93% or 16 people) and 670 households residing in the town. The population density was 47.4 inhabitants per square mile (18.3/km^{2}). The racial makeup of the town was 97.92% (1,693 people) white, 0.17% (3 people) African-American, 0.29% (5 people) Asian, 0.29% (5 people) Native American/Alaskan, 0.46% (8 people) other, and 0.87% (15 people) two or more races. 2.02% of the population was Hispanic/Latino of any race.

Out of the 670 households, 32.4% of them had children under the age of 18 living with them.

The age distribution was 24.0% (415 people) under the age of 18, 2.72% (47 people) ages 18 and 19, 5.55% (96 people) ages 20–24, 10.41% (180 people) ages 25–34, 22.73% (393 people) ages 35–49, 21.63% (374 people) ages 50–64, and 12.96% (224 people) over the age of 65. 51.3% (887 people) of the population was male while 48.7% (842 people) were female.

== Communities and locations in Charlotte ==
- Arab Hill – A location near the eastern town line. It is one of the highest points in Chautauqua County at 2,100 feet (640 m).
- Charlotte Center – A hamlet northeast of Sinclairville on County Road 77.
- Charlotte Center Gap Filler Annex – A former military establishment and commercial transmitter site at the top of Arab Hill.
- Moons – A hamlet near the western town line, located on Route 60.
- Pettit Corners – A location northwest of Sinclairville and west of Charlotte Center on Hooker Road.
- Pickett Corners (Pickett School) – A hamlet in the northwest corner of the town on County Road 75. This community was the site of the first settlement in the town.
- Sinclairville – A part of the village of Sinclairville is in the southwest corner of the town at the junction of county roads 64, 66, and 77.
