= New York State Route 424 =

Former highway in New York

New York State Route 424

Route information
- Maintained by NYSDOT
- Length: 3.2 mi (5.1 km)
- Existed: 1930–August 7, 1980

Major junctions
- West end: NY 380 in Stockton
- East end: NY 60 in Cassadaga

Location
- Country: United States
- State: New York
- Counties: Chautauqua

Highway system
- New York Highways; Interstate; US; State; Reference; Parkways
← NY 423	→ NY 425

New York State Route 424 (NY 424) was an east–west state highway in northern Chautauqua County, New York, in the United States. The route began at an intersection with NY 380 (now County Route 380 or CR 380) in the town of Stockton and ended at a junction with NY 60 in the village of Cassadaga. NY 424 was assigned as part of the 1930 renumbering of state highways in New York and removed from the state highway system in 1980 as part of a highway maintenance swap between the state of New York and Chautauqua County. The route's former alignment is now part of CR 58.

== Route description ==
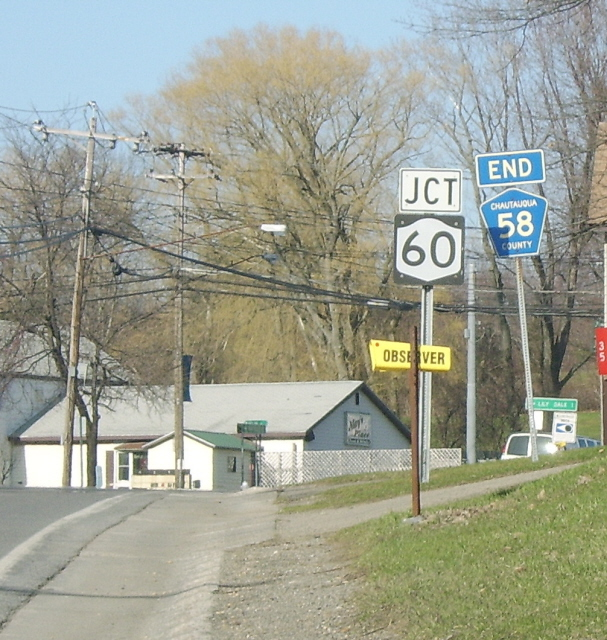
The former northern terminus of NY 424 (now the northern terminus of CR 58) at NY 60 in Cassadaga

NY 424 began at an intersection with NY 380 in the town of Stockton. The route headed northeast, passing by forests and homes as it ascended Stockton Hill. Here, it intersected with Nelson Hill Road, a short alternate route of NY 424. After reaching the top of the hill, NY 424 became known as Stockton Hill Road and went through fields on its way to the village of Cassadaga. Once in the village limits, the highway intersected Putnam Road (CR 71) in an area of Cassadaga known as Burnhams. NY 424 continued on into the heart of the village, passing by homes and the southern end of Lower Lake before coming to an end at an intersection with NY 60.

== History ==
NY 424 was assigned as part of the 1930 renumbering of state highways in New York. It went unchanged until April 1, 1980, when ownership and maintenance of the route was transferred from the state of New York to Chautauqua County as part of a highway maintenance swap between the two levels of government. The other routes given to the county were the portion of NY 380 between NY 424 and U.S. Route 20 (US 20), the entirety of NY 428, and two reference routes in Dunkirk and Fredonia. In return, the state assumed control of NY 394 between NY 5 and US 20, US 62 from NY 394 to NY 60, and Forest Avenue south of Jamestown. The NY 424 designation was officially removed on August 7, 1980, and its former routing is now part of CR 58, which was extended over the length of the state highway.

== Major intersections ==
The entire route was in Chautauqua County.

Location	mi	km	Destinations	Notes
Stockton	0.0	0.0	NY 380	Western terminus
Cassadaga	3.2	5.1	NY 60	Eastern terminus
1.000 mi = 1.609 km; 1.000 km = 0.621 mi
