= Cassadaga =

Cassadaga is a Seneca Native American word meaning Water beneath the rocks. It may refer to:

- Cassadaga, Florida
- Cassadaga, New York
  - Cassadaga Lakes, north of the village
- Cassadaga (album), by Bright Eyes
- Cassadaga (film), a 2011 film
