= Kiantone, New York =

- Town
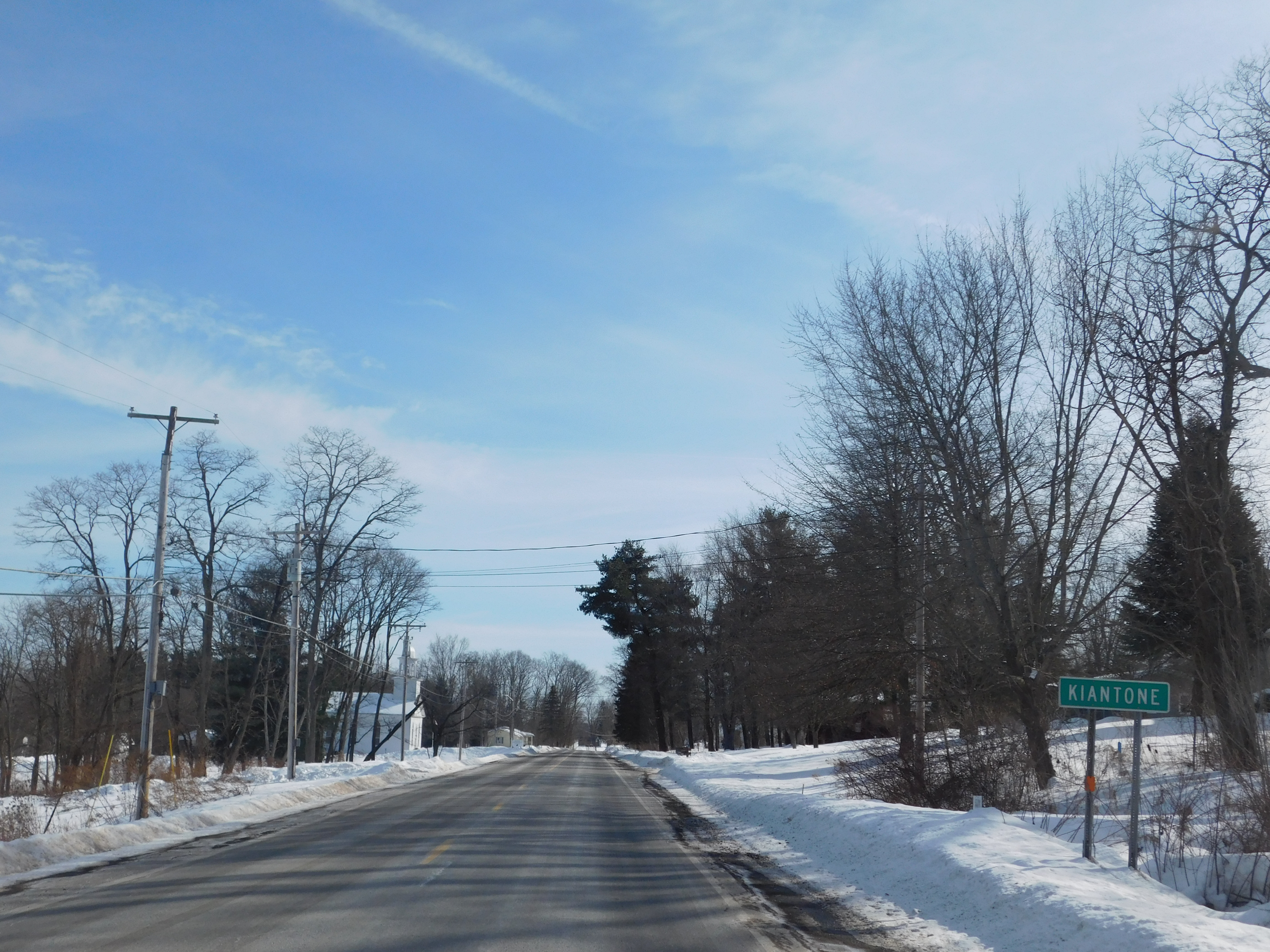
- County Route 49 southbound entering the hamlet of Kiantone.

- Location within Chautauqua County and New York state

- Location within New York Location within the United States
- Coordinates: 42°2′53″N 79°11′55″W
- Country: United States
- State: New York
- County: Chautauqua

Government
  - Type: Town Council
  - Town Supervisor: Jeffrey A. Piazza (R)
  - Town Council: Members' List: • Ronald V. Johnson (D); • Valerie L. McDonald (R); • Kevin E. Myers (R); • Kurt E. Sturzenbecker (R)

Area
  - Total: 18.54 sq mi (48.01 km^{2})
  - Land: 18.40 sq mi (47.65 km^{2})
  - Water: 0.14 sq mi (0.36 km^{2})
- Elevation: 1,480 ft (451 m)

Population (2020)
  - Total: 1,388
  - Estimate (2021): 1,376
  - Density: 71.7/sq mi (27.68/km^{2})
- Time zone: UTC-5 (Eastern (EST))
  - Summer (DST): UTC-4 (EDT)
- ZIP Code: 14701 (Jamestown)
- FIPS code: 36-013-39507
- GNIS feature ID: 0979115
- Website: kiantoneny.org

Kiantone (pronounced KIN-tone) is a town in Chautauqua County, New York, United States. As of the 2020 census, the town had a population of 1,388. The town is immediately south of Jamestown and is at the south border of the county and the state.

== History ==
The area was first settled circa 1807. The town of Kiantone was created in 1853 from part of the town of Carroll.

== Geography ==
According to the United States Census Bureau, Kiantone has a total area of 18.5 square miles (48.0 km^{2}), of which 18.4 square miles (47.6 km^{2}) is land and 0.15 square miles (0.4 km^{2}), or 0.75%, is water.

U.S. Route 62, New York State Route 60 and County Route 380 pass through the town.

Conewango Creek, a tributary of the Allegheny River, forms most of the eastern border of the town and flows south into Pennsylvania.

=== Adjacent towns and areas ===
Kiantone is bordered by the townships of Pine Grove and Farmington, both in Warren County, Pennsylvania, to the south. To the east is the town of Carroll, and to the west is the town of Busti. To the north is the city of Jamestown and the town of Ellicott.

== Demographics ==
Historical population
Census	Pop.	Note	%±
1860	552		—
1870	539		−2.4%
1880	513		−4.8%
1890	496		−3.3%
1900	491		−1.0%
1910	520		5.9%
1920	623		19.8%
1930	706		13.3%
1940	849		20.3%
1950	976		15.0%
1960	1,254		28.5%
1970	1,340		6.9%
1980	1,443		7.7%
1990	1,322		−8.4%
2000	1,387		4.9%
2010	1,350		−2.7%
2020	1,388		2.8%
2021 (est.)	1,376		−0.9%
U.S. Decennial Census

As of the census of 2000, there were 1,385 people, 529 households, and 413 families residing in the town. The population density was 75.0 inhabitants per square mile (29.0/km^{2}). There were 541 housing units at an average density of 29.3 per square mile (11.3/km^{2}). The racial makeup of the town was 98.84% White, 0.29% African American, 0.14% Native American, 0.14% from other races, and 0.58% from two or more races. Hispanic or Latino of any race were 0.14% of the population.

There were 529 households, out of which 32.7% had children under the age of 18 living with them, 69.9% were married couples living together, 4.7% had a female householder with no husband present, and 21.9% were non-families. 16.6% of all households were made up of individuals, and 8.1% had someone living alone who was 65 years of age or older. The average household size was 2.62 and the average family size was 2.92.

In the town, the population was spread out, with 24.3% under the age of 18, 4.8% from 18 to 24, 25.7% from 25 to 44, 28.6% from 45 to 64, and 16.5% who were 65 years of age or older. The median age was 43 years. For every 100 females, there were 98.7 males. For every 100 females age 18 and over, there were 100.4 males.

The median income for a household in the town was $44,702, and the median income for a family was $50,893. Males had a median income of $36,382 versus $26,302 for females. The per capita income for the town was $20,716. About 4.6% of families and 6.9% of the population were below the poverty line, including 9.6% of those under age 18 and 4.7% of those age 65 or over.

== Notable people ==
- Elmer Ellsworth Brown, educator; chancellor of New York University

== Communities and locations in Kiantone ==
- Conewango Creek – A stream that forms part of the eastern town boundary.
- Kiantone – The hamlet of Kiantone at the junction of County Roads 26 and 49 in the south part of the town.
- Stillwater – A hamlet in the northwest corner of the town on NY Route 60 and County Route 380.
