= George B. Sennett =

American ichthyologist and ornithologist

George Burritt Sennett
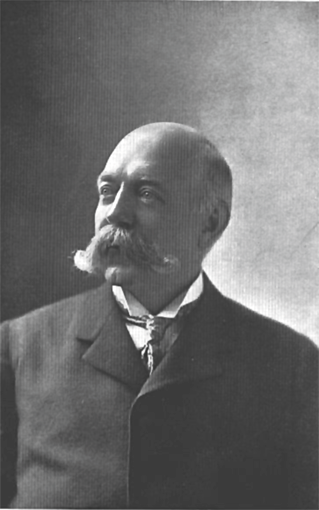
- George Burritt Sennett
- Born: July 28, 1840; Sinclairville, New York, U.S.
- Died: March 18, 1900 (aged 59); Youngstown, Ohio, U.S.
- Occupations: Ichthyologist, Ornithologist
- Notable work: Research on the birds of the Lower Rio Grande

George Burritt Sennett (July 28, 1840 in Sinclairville, New York – March 18, 1900 in Youngstown, Ohio) was an American ichthyologist and ornithologist. He came from an affluent background and, due to failing eyesight, toured Europe rather than study at Yale University. For a time he concentrated on business, but after 1873 or 1874 he became increasingly interested in ornithology. He would later correspond with Elliott Coues and develop a working relationship to him. In 1876 he had his first expedition and later wrote papers on the birds of the Lower Rio Grande. Other than expeditions he spent much of his life in Pennsylvania and Ohio.
