= Emily M. Bishop =

American Delsartean lecturer and instructor (1858–1916)

Emily Montague Mulkin Bishop
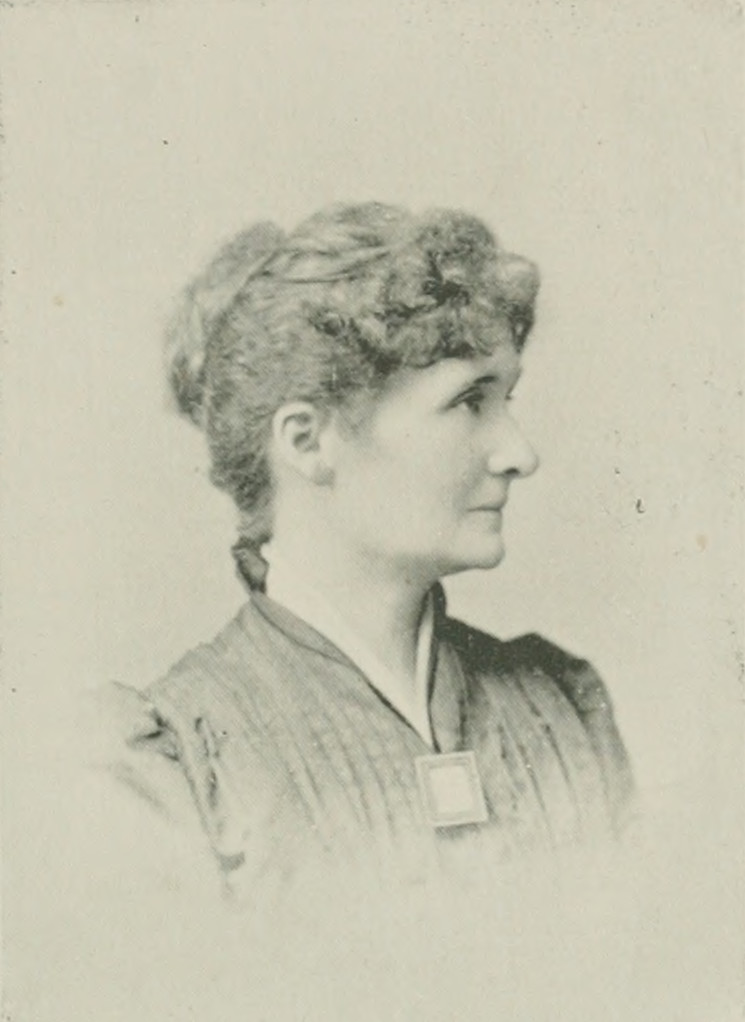
- Photo in A Woman of the Century
- Born: Emily Montague Mulkin; November 3, 1858; Forestville, Chautauqua County, New York, US
- Died: November 22, 1916 (aged 58); New York City
- Education: Forestville High School
- Occupations: Lecturer, instructor, editor, author
- Spouse: Coleman E. Bishop
- Writing career
- Language: English
- Subject: Delsarte educational movement

Emily Montague Bishop (née Mulkin; November 3, 1858 – November 22, 1916) was an American Delsartean lecturer and instructor in dress, expression and physical culture. She was recognized as one of the noted editors and authors on this subject in the United States, commonly using the name Emily M. Bishop. She was also a pioneer suffragist. Among her publications are Americanized Delsarte Culture (1892), Self-expression and Health: Americanized Delsarte Culture (1895), Interpretive Forms of Literature (1903), Seventy Years Young, or The Unhabitual Way (1907), Daily Ways to Health (1910), and The Road to "Seventy Years Young": Or, The Unhabitual Way (1916).

== Early life and education ==
Emily Montague Mulkin was born in Forestville, Chautauqua County, New York, November 3, 1858. Her parents were Asa L. Mulkins (1827-1893) and Ann E. (De Witt) Mulkins (1827-1861).

She was educated in the Forestville High School.

== Career ==
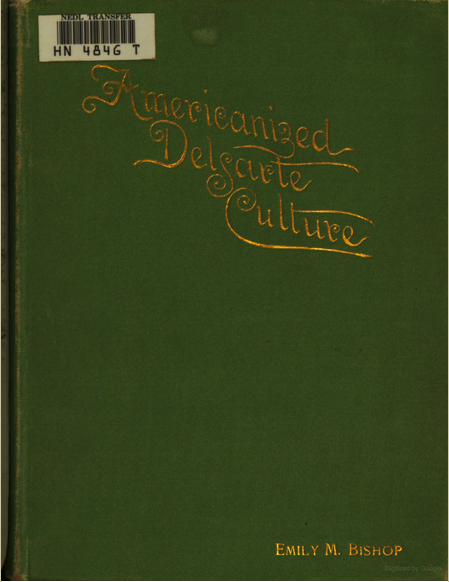
Americanized Delsarte Culture (1892)

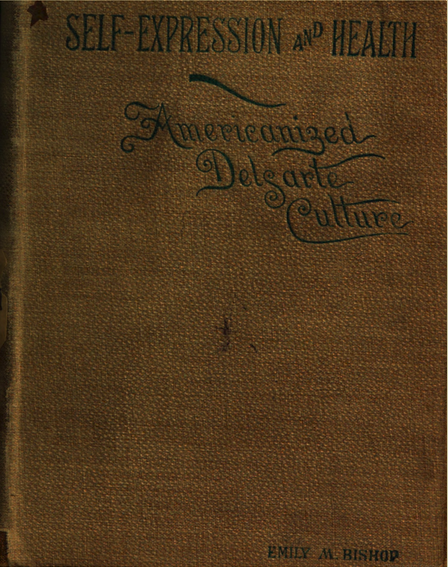
Self-expression and Health; Americanized Delsarte Culture (1895)

Daily ways to health (1910)

The road to "Seventy Years Young" (1916)

After leaving school, Bishop taught for four years, serving as assistant principal of the union school in Silver Creek, New York. She then gave several years to the study of Delsarte work in various cities.

After marriage, she moved to Black Hills, South Dakota. Bishop was elected superintendent of public schools in Rapid City, South Dakota, being the first woman thus honored in the Dakota Territory.

In 1885, she was invited to establish a Delsarte department in the Chautauqua School of Physical Education, in the Chautauqua Assembly, New York. She has had charge of that department for four seasons, and it steadily grew in popularity. In 1891, it was the largest single department in the Assembly. From the Chautauqua work grew a large public work in lecturing and teaching. Her lectures were on literature and physical culture. She gave public readings at the Pratt Institute, Brooklyn; Drexel Institute, Philadelphia; Mechanics Institute, Rochester, New York; and in principal cities of the U.S. and Canada. She was the originator and interpreter of the political readings known as "Dramatic Scenes from the United States Senate", through which she gained national fame.

She wrote a number of articles for various magazines and published several books, including Americanized Delsarte Culture.

== Personal life ==
In 1884, she married Coleman E. Bishop, editor of the Judge, New York.

In addition to the Dakota Territory, Bishop lived in New York City, and in Washington, D.C.

Just before her illness, Bishop became connected with the Women's Democratic League and spoke at meetings on behalf of President Wilson. She died November 22, 1916, at New York Hospital, in New York City, age 58.

== Selected works ==
- Americanized Delsarte Culture, 1892
- Self-expression and Health: Americanized Delsarte Culture, 1895
- Interpretive Forms of Literature, 1903
- Seventy Years Young, or The Unhabitual Way, 1907
- Daily Ways to Health, 1910
- The Road to "Seventy Years Young": Or, The Unhabitual Way, 1916
