= Stockton State Forest =

State forest in New York

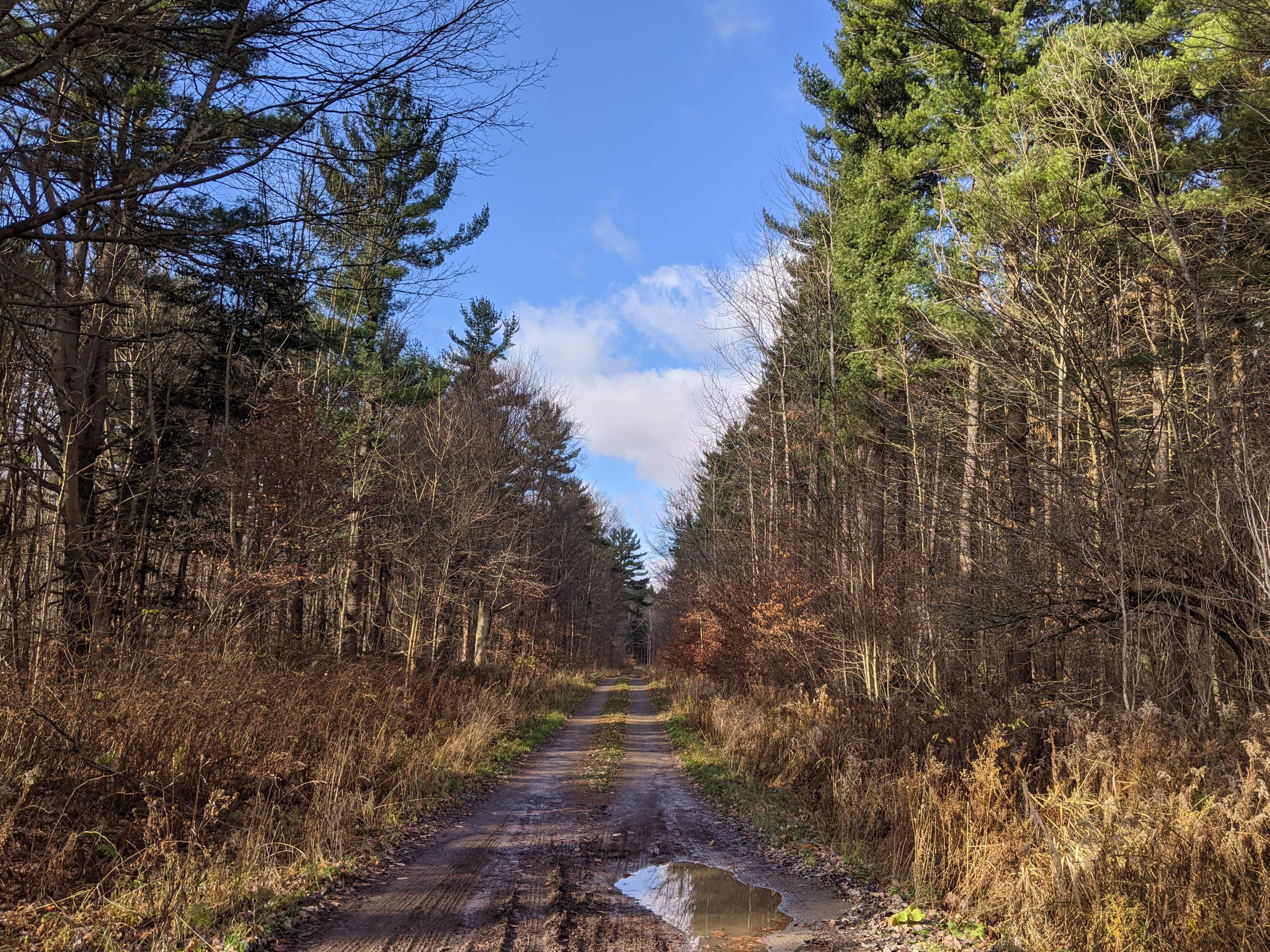
- Stockton State Forest, November 2020

- Location within New York
- Nearest city: Stockton, New York
- Coordinates: 42.280776°N 79.397212°W
- Area: 977 acres (395 ha)
- Owner: New York State Department of Environmental Conservation

Stockton State Forest is a 977-acre New York State Forest. It is located in Stockton, New York, between the Chautauqua Lake and Cassadaga Creek watersheds. It was established in the 1930s for timber harvesting and land conservation.

== Ecology ==
Stockton State Forest is home to populations of white-tailed deer, ruffed grouse, rabbit, and turkey. Conifer stands of pine and spruce trees were once planted, but are now managed by the New York State Department of Environmental Conservation for the natural regeneration of native hardwood trees. Marshy wetlands in the forest create habitat for swallows, ducks, and beavers. There are almost 200 species of bird that have been spotted during annual surveys.

== Recreation ==
There are no designated walking trails in Stockton State Forest, but biking, cross-country skiing, snowshoeing, hiking, and horseback riding are allowed. There are three miles of maintained snowmobile trails. Primitive camping, hunting, and trapping are permitted.
