= New York State Route 60 =

State highway in Chautauqua County, New York, US

New York State Route 60
- Map of Chautauqua County and vicinity with NY 60 highlighted in red

Route information
- Maintained by NYSDOT and the city of Jamestown
- Length: 33.16 mi (53.37 km)
- Existed: 1920s–present

Major junctions
- South end: US 62 in Kiantone
- I-86 / NY 17 / Southern Tier Expressway in Ellicott; US 20 in Fredonia I-90 Toll / New York Thruway in Dunkirk town
- North end: NY 5 in Dunkirk city

Location
- Country: United States
- State: New York
- Counties: Chautauqua

Highway system
- New York Highways; Interstate; US; State; Reference; Parkways
← NY 59	→ NY 61

New York State Route 60 (NY 60) is a north–south state highway in Chautauqua County, New York, in the United States. The southern terminus of the route is at an intersection with U.S. Route 62 (US 62) south of the city of Jamestown in the town of Kiantone. Its northern terminus is at a junction with NY 5 in the city of Dunkirk. In between, NY 60 intersects the lengthy County Route 380 (CR 380) in Kiantone and Gerry, the Southern Tier Expressway (Interstate 86 or I-86 and NY 17) in Ellicott, and the New York State Thruway (I-90) in the town of Dunkirk.

== Route description ==
NY 60 begins at an intersection with US 62 (West Main Street) in the town of Kiantone, just west of the hamlet of Frewsburg. NY 60 heads northwestward through Kiantone as Stillwater–Frewsburg Road, entering the hamlet of Stillwater. There, NY 60 intersects with County Route 380 (CR 380; Busti Stillwater Road / Peck Settlement Road) and CR 49 (Kiantone Road) and is known as Foote Avenue Extension. At this intersection, NY 60 turns northward through Kiantone, changing names to Foote Avenue as it enters the city of Jamestown. NY 60 is at this point a four-lane commercial arterial through the southern end of the city, passing to the west of Allen Park and soon bending to the northwest, where it forks off Foote Avenue onto NYS Arterial Highway, passing to the north of Fenton Park. NY 60 then crosses the Washington Street Bridge over West Harrison Street, the Chadakoin River, and the former Erie Railroad's Meadville Division and near the former Jamestown Diesel Shop, constructed in the early 1950s. As Washington Street, NY 60 continues into the business district of downtown Jamestown.

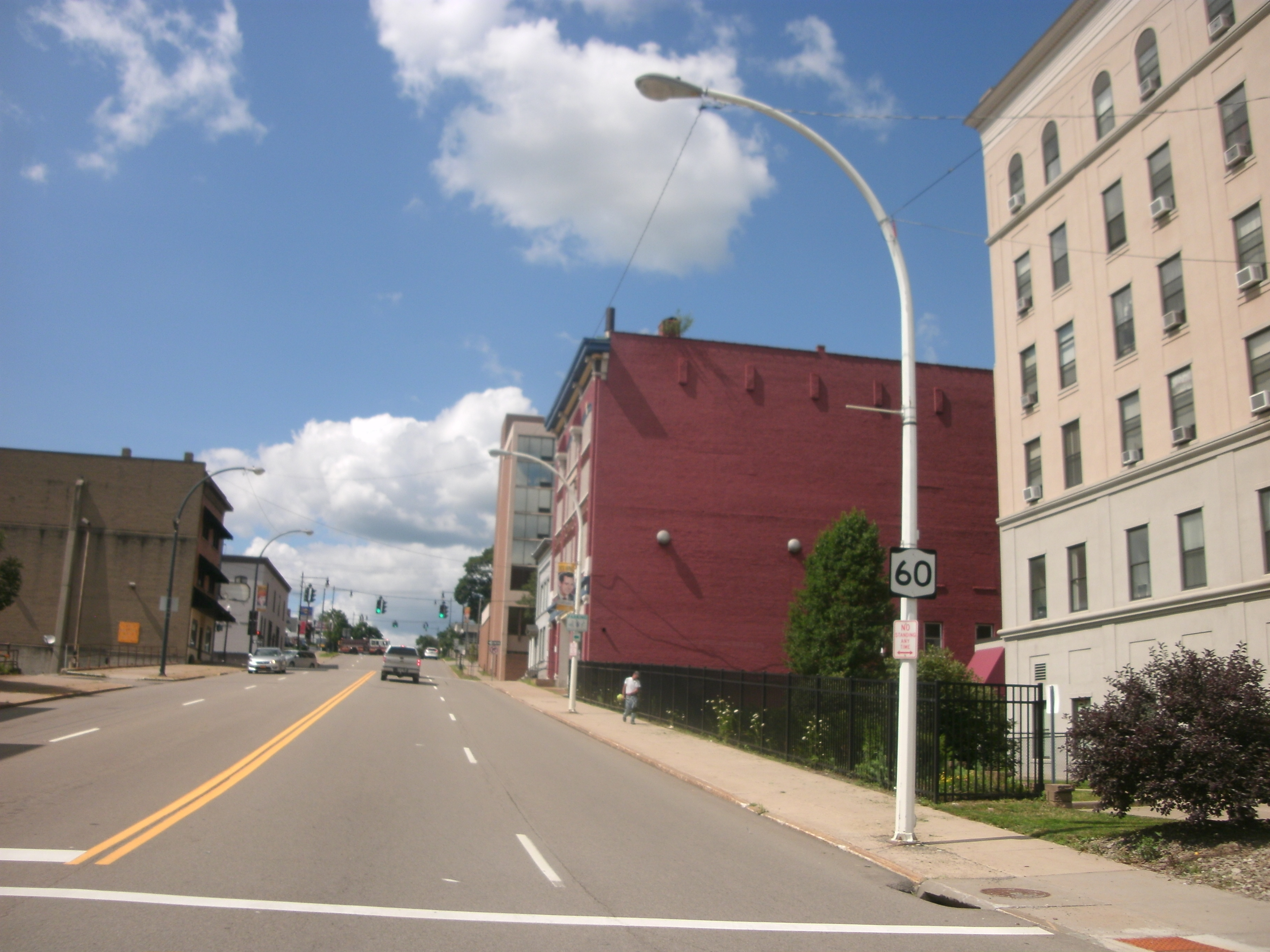
NY 60 northbound continues through downtown Jamestown, now known as Washington Street, approaching NY 394

as a four-lane local street heading northward through the city for 3 blocks. At the intersection with West Fifth Street, NY 60 turns eastward onto the street, forming a concurrency with NY 394 until North Main Street, where NY 60 turns left off of NY 394 east. After the split, NY 60 intersects with NY 394 westbound at Sixth Street, before continuing as North Main Street, a residential street through the northern sections of Jamestown. After crossing 23rd Street, NY 60 intersects with Fluvanna Avenue. The road continues northward, passing Lake View Cemetery and an intersection with CR 61 (West Oak Hill Road) before entering the town of Ellicott, where NY 60 enters interchange 12 of the Southern Tier Expressway (I-86/NY 17). After the interchange, the route continues northward as North Main Street Extension, passing Moon Brook Country Club.

Now north of Jamestown, NY 60 begins to become a two-lane rural highway, passing to the northeast and serving an industrial park adjacent to Jamestown Airport in Ellicott. NY 60 soon turns to the northwest, bending northward into the hamlet of Kimball Stand. In Kimball Stand, NY 60 crosses over but does not intersect with CR 380 (North Work Street) once again. A short distance later, it intersects with CR 44 (Old Route 60), which serves as the eastern terminus for the county route. Until 1980, this intersection served as the southern terminus for NY 380, eliminated in 1980. Continuing north out of Kimball Stand, NY 60 enters the town of Gerry. After crossing a creek, the route turns to the northeast, intersecting with CR 65 (Gerry-Levant Road), which NY 60 turns to the northwest on. The former right-of-way continues to the northeast as CR 50 (Gerry-Ellington Road). NY 60 heads northwestward as the main street through the hamlet of Gerry, soon abandoning the hamlet for the rural backdrop to the north. The route becomes a northward residential street, until intersecting with CR 77 (Jamestown Road) in the village of Sinclairville. The route bends to the northwest again, crossing over but not intersecting with CR 66 (Sinclair Drive). After leaving Sinclairville, NY 60 re-enters the town of Gerry, becoming a rural farm road before entering the town of Charlotte.

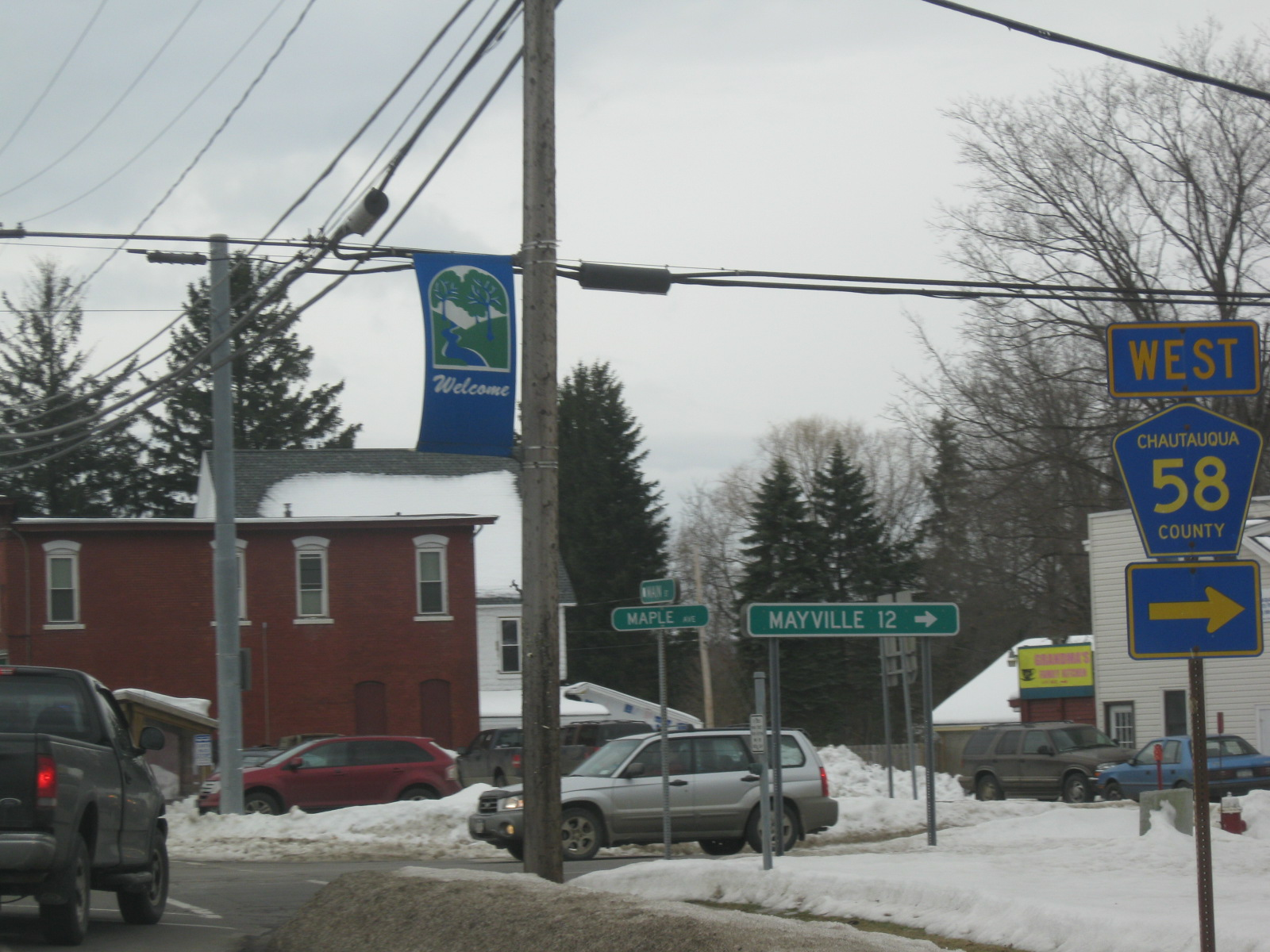
NY 60 at CR 58 in Cassadaga

Through Charlotte, NY 60 continues northward as a two-lane local road, entering the hamlet of Moons, which consists of a few farms and residences. The route becomes largely rural once again through Charlotte, turning to the northwest and intersecting with CR 75 (Nelson Road). A short distance after, NY 60 leaves Charlotte for the town of Stockton and into the village of Cassadaga, where it gains the moniker of South Main Street. The route becomes primarily residential, intersecting with the terminus of CR 58 (Maple Avenue). This intersection served as the northern terminus of NY 424, a designation eliminated in 1980. At the northern end of Cassadaga, NY 60 intersects with the western terminus of CR 72 (Bard Road). Paralleling the nearby Upper Lake, the route leaves the village for the town of Pomfret, becoming a two-lane roadway through woods and some residences through the hamlet of Shumla. Shumla consists of several residences before entering the hamlet of Laona, where NY 60 intersects with the northern terminus of NY 83. Laona consists of several farms and residences before leaving north of the intersection with Eagle Road.

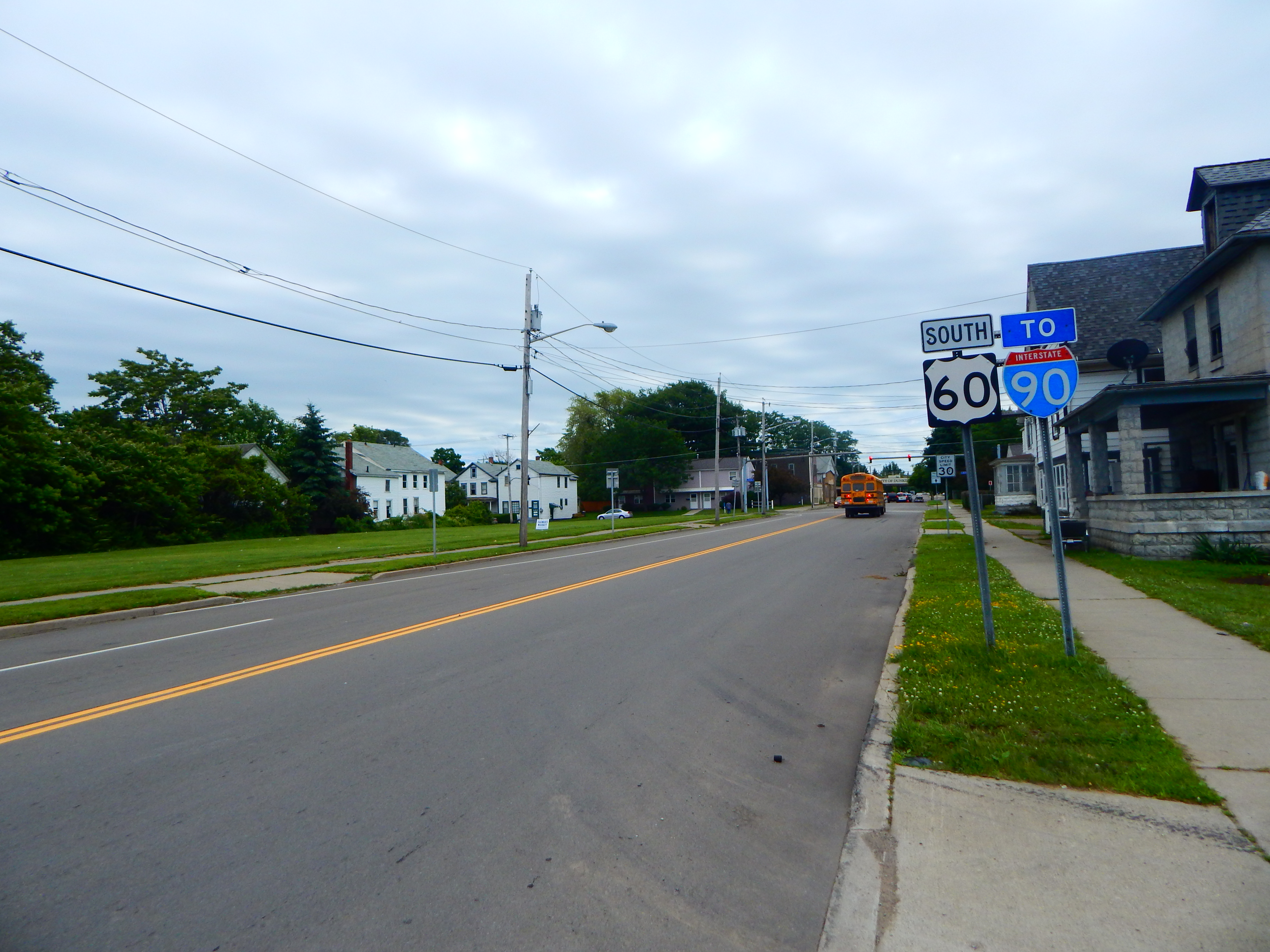
NY 60 southbound in Dunkirk, erroneously signed as US 60

Leaving Laona, NY 60 continues northward through a rural backdrop bending to the north at an intersection with Lakeview Road. After this point, NY 60 enters the village of Fredonia, where it gains the moniker of Bennett Road after a roundabout intersection with US 20 (East Main Street). NY 60 becomes a four-lane arterial through Fredonia, entering interchange 59 off the New York State Thruway (I-90). After the interchange, NY 60 crosses over the Thruway, and continues as a four-lane road into the town of Dunkirk as Bennett Road. NY 60 passes St. Mary's Cemetery and Jamestown Community College before crossing over a former Nickel Plate Railroad line and enters the city of Dunkirk as Lamphere Street until East Seventh Street. After that intersection, NY 60 becomes known as Maple Drive until Sixth Street, where it becomes Main Street. The route passes some businesses before crossing under a former New York Central Railroad line currently used by CSX Transportation. A short distance after the underpass, NY 60 reaches its northern terminus at the intersection with NY 5 (Lake Shore Drive) near the shores of Lake Erie.

== History ==
When NY 60 was assigned in the mid-1920s, it began at the New York–Pennsylvania border southeast of Jamestown and ended at NY 5 (now US 20) in Fredonia. In between, the route passed through Frewsburg, Jamestown, and Cassadaga. From Laona to Fredonia, NY 60 was routed on Porter Avenue, Liberty Street, and Water Street. NY 60 was extended north to NY 20A (modern NY 5) in Dunkirk by way of Temple Street and Central Avenue as part of the 1930 renumbering of state highways in New York.

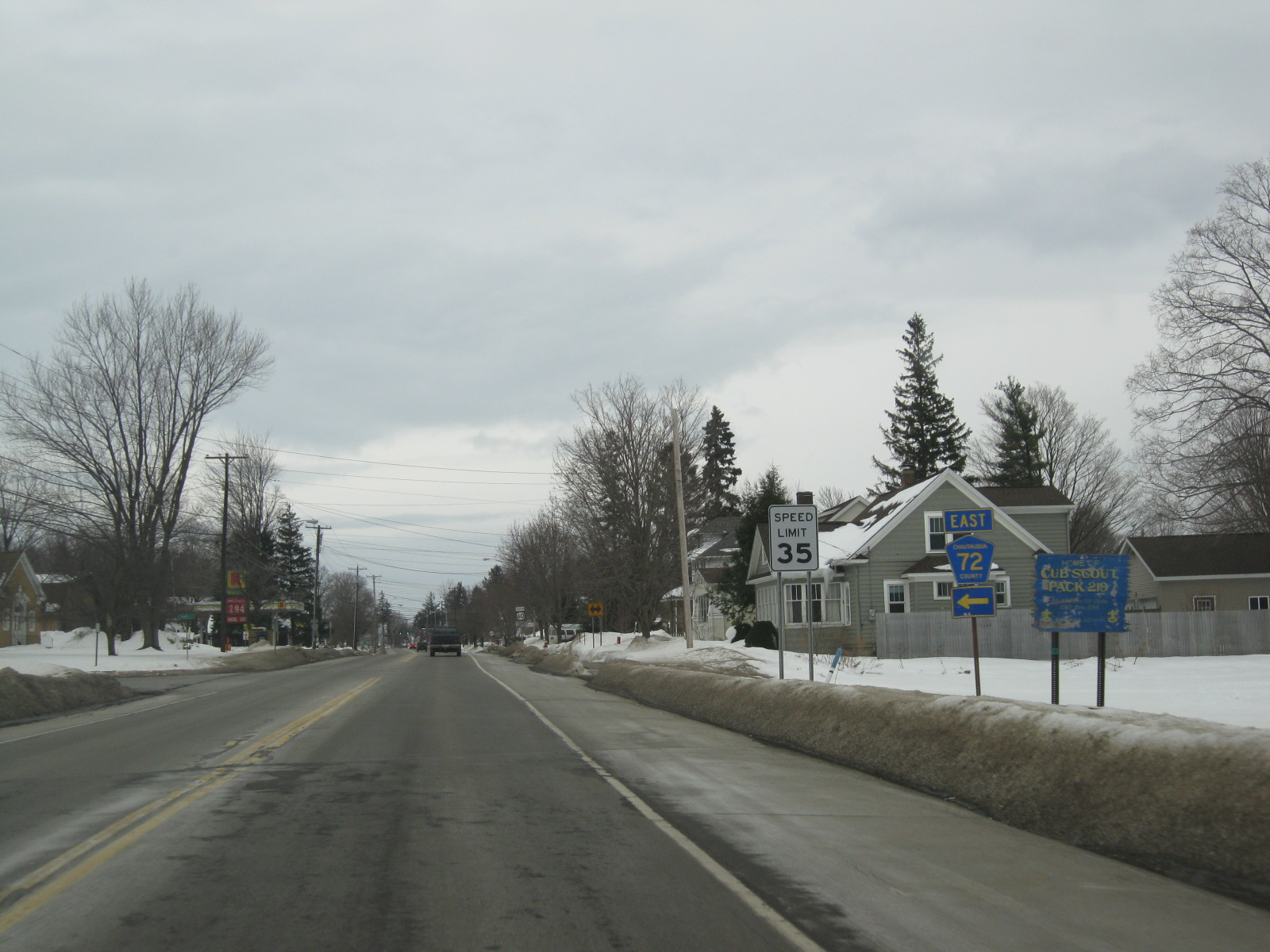
NY 60 at the intersection with CR 72 in Cassadaga

US 62 was extended into New York c. 1932. From the Pennsylvania state line to Frewsburg, US 62 initially overlapped NY 60. The overlap was eliminated in the 1940s when NY 60 was truncated northward to its junction with US 62 in Frewsburg. In the mid-1960s, construction began on a new alignment for US 62 between the Pennsylvania state line and NY 60 west of Frewsburg. The highway opened to traffic as a realignment of US 62 by 1972. As a result, NY 60 was truncated to its junction with the new US 62 roadway and the routing of former NY 60 to Frewsburg became part of US 62 on July 1, 1972.

NY 60 was realigned in the early 1960s to bypass Fredonia to the east on a newly upgraded highway leading from Laona to Reed Corners (US 20). From there, NY 60 was to follow a new highway to a point on Central Avenue near where it passes under the New York State Thruway, where it would continue into Dunkirk on its original alignment. By 1968, the idea of constructing a new roadway was dropped and NY 60 was altered to use Bennett Road, Lamphere Street, and Main Street instead to reach East Lake Shore Drive (NY 5). The section of Main Street north of Franklin Street had been part of NY 39 from 1930 to the mid-1960s, when NY 39 was cut back to its current western terminus.

The former routing of NY 60 between Laona and US 20 in the center of Fredonia remained state maintained as an unsigned reference route for over a decade after it ceased to be part of NY 60. On April 1, 1980, ownership and maintenance of the reference route was transferred from the state of New York to Chautauqua County as part of a highway maintenance swap between the two levels of government. The highway is now internally designated as County Highway 140 by Chautauqua County; however, it does not have a signed number.

NY 60 has been particularly prone to a large number of automobile crashes that lead to fatalities. Since 1972, 82 fatal car crashes have been documented on the highway. The high traffic on the two-lane highway, which is the main road between Jamestown and Dunkirk, makes it difficult and dangerous for vehicles to pass.

== Major intersections ==
The entire route is in Chautauqua County.

Location	mi	km	Destinations	Notes
Kiantone	0.00	0.00	US 62 (West Main Street) – Frewsburg, Warren PA	Southern terminus
Jamestown	3.67	5.91	Forest Avenue (NY 952P south)	
Jamestown	4.15	6.68	NY 394 east (West Fifth Street)	Western terminus of NY 60 / NY 394 overlap
Jamestown	4.27	6.87	NY 394 east (West Fifth Street)	Eastern terminus of NY 60 / NY 394 overlap
Jamestown	4.33	6.97	NY 394 west (West Sixth Street)	
Jamestown	5.21	8.38	NY 430 west (Fluvanna Avenue)	Eastern terminus of NY 430
Ellicott	5.89	9.48	I-86 / NY 17 – Binghamton, Erie PA	Exit 12 on I-86
Gerry	9.73	15.66	CR 44 (Salisbury Road) to CR 380 (Kimball Stand - Stockton Road)	Former southern terminus of NY 380; hamlet of Kimball Stand
Cassadaga	22.80	36.69	CR 58 (Maple Avenue) – Mayville	Former northern terminus of NY 424
Pomfret	27.70	44.58	NY 83 south – South Dayton, Cherry Creek	Hamlet of Laona; northern terminus of NY 83
Fredonia	30.31	48.78	US 20 (East Main Street) – Fredonia, Silver Creek	
Town of Dunkirk	30.93	49.78	I-90 / New York Thruway – Erie, Buffalo	Exit 59 on I-90 / Thruway
City of Dunkirk	33.16	53.37	NY 5 / LECT (Lake Shore Drive)	Northern terminus
1.000 mi = 1.609 km; 1.000 km = 0.621 mi: Concurrency terminus; Electronic toll collection
