= Stockton, New York =

- Town
- Location within Chautauqua County and New York state

- Location within New York Location within the United States
- Coordinates: 42°18′9″N 79°21′5″W
- Country: United States
- State: New York
- County: Chautauqua

Government
  - Type: Town Council
  - Town Supervisor: David J. Wilson
  - Town Council: Members' List: • John Beichner (R); • Stanley P. Zembryski (D); • Allen S. Chase (R); • Bryan J. Meder (R)

Area
  - Total: 47.65 sq mi (123.41 km^{2})
  - Land: 47.16 sq mi (122.15 km^{2})
  - Water: 0.49 sq mi (1.27 km^{2})
- Elevation: 1,293 ft (394 m)

Population (2020)
  - Total: 2,036
  - Estimate (2021): 2,016
  - Density: 45.2/sq mi (17.46/km^{2})
- Time zone: UTC-5 (Eastern (EST))
  - Summer (DST): UTC-4 (EDT)
- ZIP Codes: 14784 (Stockton); 14718 (Cassadaga); 14728 (Dewittville); 14782 (Sinclairville)
- Area code: 716
- FIPS code: 36-013-71476
- GNIS feature ID: 0979530
- Website: www.stocktonny.org

Stockton is a town in Chautauqua County, New York, United States. The population was 2,036 at the 2020 census. The town is named after Richard Stockton, who signed the Declaration of Independence.

== History ==
The area was first settled circa 1810. The town of Stockton was formed in 1821 from territory taken from the town of Chautauqua. Predation by wolves was a more severe problem in this town than neighboring communities. In 1850, the town was increased in size by adding territory from the town of Ellery.

== Geography ==
According to the United States Census Bureau, Stockton has a total area of 47.6 square miles (123.4 km^{2}), of which 47.1 square miles (122.1 km^{2}) is land and 0.50 square miles (1.3 km^{2}), or 1.03%, is water. New York State Route 60 is a major north–south highway in the eastern part of the town.

== Notable people ==
- Forrest Crissey, writer
- Ralph "Bucky" Phillips, notable ex-fugitive

== Adjacent towns and areas ==
- Portland; Pomfret
- Charlotte; Gerry
- Ellery'
- Chautauqua

== Demographics ==
Historical population
Census	Pop.	Note	%±
1830	1,604		—
1840	2,078		29.6%
1850	1,640		−21.1%
1860	1,887		15.1%
1870	1,639		−13.1%
1880	1,868		14.0%
1890	1,730		−7.4%
1900	1,852		7.1%
1910	1,781		−3.8%
1920	1,674		−6.0%
1930	1,574		−6.0%
1940	1,651		4.9%
1950	1,889		14.4%
1960	2,156		14.1%
1970	2,213		2.6%
1980	2,331		5.3%
1990	2,515		7.9%
2000	2,331		−7.3%
2010	2,248		−3.6%
2020	2,036		−9.4%
2021 (est.)	2,016		−1.0%
U.S. Decennial Census

At the 2000 census there were 2,331 people, 859 households, and 649 families in the town. The population density was 49.3 inhabitants per square mile (19.0/km^{2}). There were 1,054 housing units at an average density of 22.3 per square mile (8.6/km^{2}). The racial makeup of the town was 97.60% White, 0.09% African American, 0.21% Native American, 0.30% Asian, 0.51% from other races, and 1.29% from two or more races. Hispanic or Latino of any race were 1.54%.

Of the 859 households 33.2% had children under the age of 18 living with them, 63.9% were married couples living together, 7.1% had a female householder with no husband present, and 24.4% were non-families. 20.7% of households were one person and 10.4% were one person aged 65 or older. The average household size was 2.71 and the average family size was 3.14.

The age distribution was 27.2% under the age of 18, 6.8% from 18 to 24, 28.3% from 25 to 44, 24.4% from 45 to 64, and 13.3% 65 or older. The median age was 38 years. For every 100 females, there were 96.4 males. For every 100 females age 18 and over, there were 99.4 males.

The median household income was $39,423 and the median family income was $44,146. Males had a median income of $32,880 versus $21,667 for females. The per capita income for the town was $17,717. About 7.7% of families and 9.9% of the population were below the poverty line, including 13.3% of those under age 18 and 3.0% of those age 65 or over.

At the 2010 census, there were 2,248 people (decrease of 83 people, or 3.56%), and 897 households (increase of 38, or 4.42%). The population density of the town was 47.5 people per square mile (18.3/km^{2}). The racial makeup of the town was: 97.46% white (2191 people), 0.45% African American (10 people), 0.27% Asian (6 people), 0.13% Native American or Alaskan (3 people), 0.49% other (11 people), and 1.20% from two or more races (27 people). Also, 1.42% of people (32 people) stated they were Hispanic/Latino.

Of the 897 households 32.2% had children under the age of 18 living with them.

The age distribution was 23.3% (524 people) of the population under the age of 18, 3.1% (69 people) ages 18 and 19, 4.63% (104 people) ages 20–24, 9.88% (222 people) ages 25–34, 21.44% (482 people) ages 35–49, 22.69% (510 people) ages 50–64, and 14.99% (337 people) over the age of 65. 49.6% of the population was male (1,115 people) while 50.4% of the population was female (1,133 people).

== Communities and locations in Stockton ==
- Bear Lake Outlet – A stream that flows south through the town past Kelly Corners and Stockton and enters Cassadaga Creek near Kabob.
- Burnhams – A hamlet west of Cassadaga village on County Road 58 and at the south end of Cassadaga Lake that was annexed by the village of Cassadaga in the early 1920s.
- Cassadaga – The village of Cassadaga is in the northeast part of the town on NY Route 60, at the southern end and outlet of Cassadaga Lake. Cassadaga village is adjacent to the community of Lily Dale to the north in the town of Pomfret.
- Cassadaga Creek – A stream that flows from Cassadaga Lake and out of the southeast corner of the town past the community of South Stockton. It is a tributary of Conewango Creek, which flows south to the Allegheny River and subsequently the Ohio and Mississippi rivers.
- Cassadaga Lakes – A lake partly in the northeast part of the town.
- Centralia – A hamlet on County Road 380 near the south town line.
- Coes Corners – A location on County Road 58 in the western part of the town
- Dentons Corners – A location on County Road 54 in the southwest part of the town.
- Kabob – A hamlet on County Road 71 near the eastern town line.
- Kelly Corners – A hamlet on County Road 380 in the western part of the town.
- Moons or Moons Station – A hamlet on the eastern town border, east of Kabob and south of Cassadaga village on Route 60, named for DC Moon, a primary supporter of and contributor of land in the area for the Dunkirk, Allegheny Valley and Pittsburgh Railroad.
- Pleasantville – A hamlet on County Road 54 in the southwest corner of the town.
- South Stockton – A hamlet in the southeast corner of the town on County Road 380.
- Stockton - The hamlet of Stockton on County Road 380 west of Cassadaga; formerly known as Delanti.
- Stockton State Forest – A New York State Forest located in the town.

== Fire service ==
The Stockton Volunteer Fire Company and Cassadaga Volunteer Fire Department provide emergency services within the township. The Cassadaga VFD covers emergency calls within the village of Cassadaga and most of the town of Arkwright to the northeast. The Stockton Volunteer Fire Company covers the rest of the township. Before the Stockton Volunteer Fire Company obtained an ambulance in the early 1990s, Cassadaga would cover all EMS calls.

List of Stockton Volunteer Fire Company equipment:

- A-181, Ambulance (BLS)
- R-181, Heavy Rescue
- E-181, Fire Engine (1500 Gallons and holds the jaws of life)
- E-182, Pumper-Tanker (2440 Gallons)
- T-181, Tanker/Tender (2650 Gallons)
- ATV-181, Off-Road rescue vehicle with rescue sled/trailer. During the Summer, it holds water tanks for wild fires.

List of Cassadaga Volunteer Fire Department

- A-101, Ambulance
- M-101, Miscellaneous Vehicle
- E-101
- E-102
- T-101, Tanker/Tender
- Gator-101, Off-Road Rescue Vehicle

Fundraisers held by the Stockton Volunteer Fire Company include Turkey Parties, Boot Drive, Fund Drive, and Chicken BBQ's. A long-term fundraiser since the mid-1990s is the local post office. SVFC rents the building to USPS. Fundraisers held by the Cassadaga Volunteer Fire Department include Turkey Parties, Fund Drive, Chicken BBQ's and a huge Gun Raffle where 50 guns are raffled off easily.
