= Les Dye =

American football player (1916–2000)

No. 38
- Position: End

Personal information
- Born: July 15, 1916; Forestville, New York, U.S.
- Died: August 11, 2000 (aged 84); Salem, Virginia, U.S.

Career information
- High school: Wellsville
- College: Syracuse

Career history
- 1944–1945: Washington Redskins

Career statistics
- Games played: 19
- Starts: 3
- Receptions: 32
- Yards receiving: 365
- Touchdowns: 4
- Stats at Pro Football Reference

Lester Henry Dye (July 15, 1916 – August 11, 2000) was an American football end in the National Football League (NFL) for the Washington Redskins. He played college football at Syracuse University.

== Biography ==
Redskins end Dye (#38) comes over the top to help teammate Leo Presley bring down Bill Paschal of the New York Giants, Oct. 28, 1945.

Dye served as the athletic director at Syracuse University from 1973 until 1978. In 1976, he hired Jim Boeheim as the seventh head basketball coach for the Syracuse Orange men's basketball team.
