= Cassadaga Lakes =

Lake chain in New York, United States

- Location within New York Location within the United States
- Location: Chautauqua County, New York, United States
- Coordinates: 42°20′38″N 79°19′13″W
- Primary outflows: Cassadaga Creek
- Basin countries: United States
- Surface area: 211 acres (0.85 km^{2})
- Average depth: 10 feet (3.0 m)
- Max. depth: 50 feet (15 m)
- Shore length^{1}: 5.1 miles (8.2 km)
- Surface elevation: 1,306 feet (398 m)
- Settlements: Cassadaga, New York
- ^{1} Shore length is not a well-defined measure.

Cassadaga Lakes are located north of Cassadaga, New York. The lake chain consists of Upper Cassadaga Lake, Middle Cassadaga Lake, and Lower Cassadaga Lake. Fish species present in the lakes are largemouth bass, northern pike, smallmouth bass, pumpkinseed sunfish, bluegill, tiger muskie, muskellunge, black crappie, yellow perch, and black bullhead. There is a state owned boat launch located on Middle Cassadaga off Glasgow Road.
