= New York State Route 380 =

Former highway in New York

New York State Route 380
- Map of Chautauqua County with NY 380 highlighted in red

Route information
- Maintained by NYSDOT and Chautauqua County
- Length: 22.98 mi (36.98 km)
- Existed: 1930–August 7, 1980

Major junctions
- South end: NY 60 in Gerry
- US 20 in Brocton
- North end: NY 5 near Brocton

Location
- Country: United States
- State: New York
- Counties: Chautauqua

Highway system
- New York Highways; Interstate; US; State; Reference; Parkways
← NY 379	→ NY 381

New York State Route 380 (NY 380) was a 23-mile (37 km) north–south state highway in Chautauqua County, New York, in the United States. The southern terminus of the route was at an intersection with NY 60 in the town of Gerry. Its northern terminus was at a junction with NY 5 north of the village of Brocton in the town of Portland. In actuality, most of NY 380 was maintained by Chautauqua County; the only part that was maintained by the New York State Department of Transportation was from NY 424 in Stockton to the west end of its overlap with U.S. Route 20 (US 20) in Brocton.

NY 380 was assigned as part of the 1930 renumbering of state highways in New York. On April 1, 1980, ownership and maintenance of NY 380 from NY 424 to the east end of its overlap with US 20 was transferred to Chautauqua County as part of a highway maintenance swap between the county and the state of New York. NY 380 was redesignated as County Route 380 (CR 380) just over four months later on August 7, 1980. Unlike its state-numbered predecessor, CR 380 continues south of NY 60 to the town of Busti, where it ends at a junction with Forest Avenue.

== Route description ==
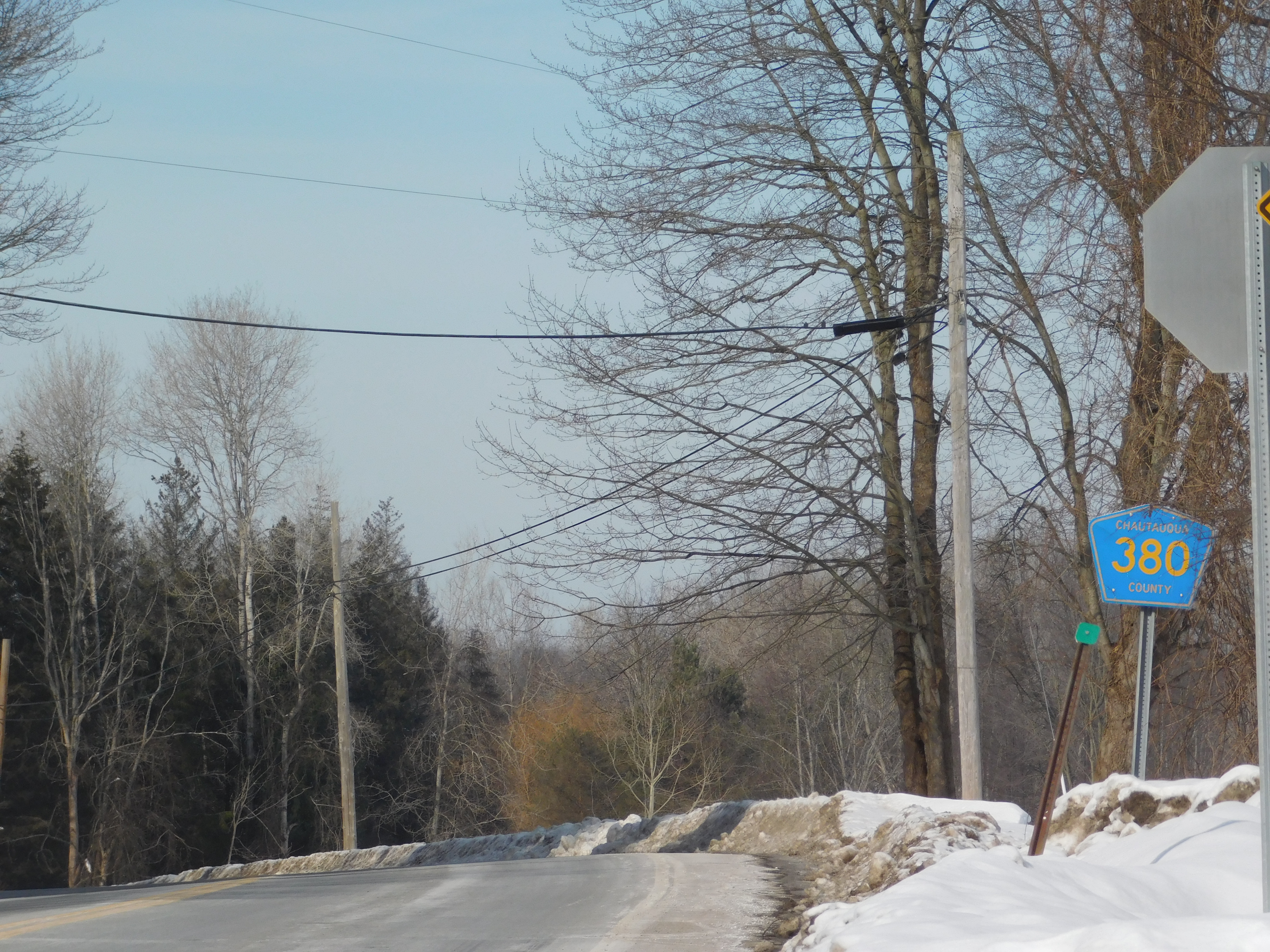
Looking north from CR 44 near the former southern terminus of NY 380 at NY 60 in Kimball Stand

NY 380 began at the modern intersection of NY 60 and CR 44 in the Ellicott community of Kimball Stand. The route proceeded west along modern CR 44 to what is now CR 380, where it turned north to join the current alignment of CR 380. NY 380 left the vicinity of Kimball Stand and headed northwest along the base of a valley surrounding Cassadaga Creek to the hamlet of Towerville, where it intersected with CR 59 and CR 48. After leaving Towerville, Route 380 went northward into the town of Ellery. Here, it intersected CR 52 and CR 66 in Redbird, a community in the extreme northeastern corner of the town.

The route continued past Redbird into the town of Stockton, where it left Cassadaga Creek and headed uphill as it curved to the west. In Centralia, NY 380 met CR 54 and CR 57 at a four-way intersection. Here, NY 380 turned back to the north and descended into another valley surrounding the Bear Lake Outlet. The route crossed the outlet and followed the waterway into the hamlet of Stockton, centered on the intersection between NY 380 and NY 424 (now part of CR 58).

NY 380 continued to run along the Bear Lake Outlet to a junction known as Kelly Corners southeast of Bear Lake. At this point, NY 380 turned westward and crossed over the outlet on its way to a more isolated area of the town. It intersected CR 37 before curving back to the north and passing through the town of Portland on its way into the village of Brocton. Here, NY 380 overlapped with US 20 for about 0.25 miles (0.40 km) before exiting the village. NY 380 crossed over the New York State Thruway (Interstate 90) just before it came to an end at an intersection with NY 5 on the southern shore of Lake Erie. Lake Erie State Park is about a few hundred feet up the road on NY 5 eastbound.

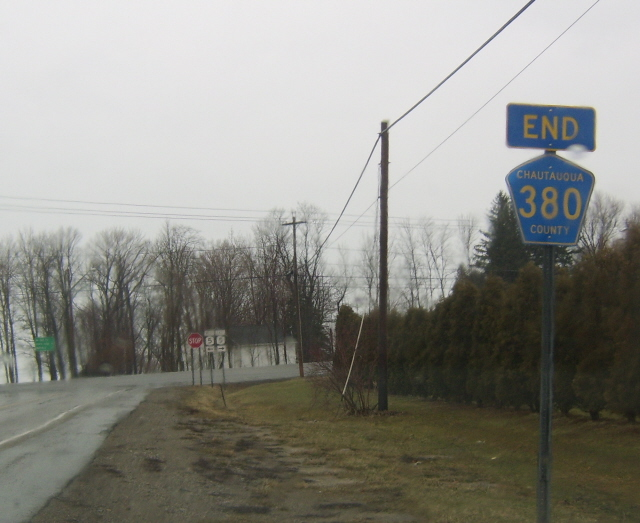
CR 380's northern terminus is at NY 5 in Brocton. This intersection was also the northern terminus of NY 380.

== History ==
NY 380 was assigned as part of the 1930 renumbering of state highways in New York and extended from NY 60 north of Jamestown to NY 5 north of Brocton, a routing that remained in place up to and through the 1970s. Although the highway was signed as a state route, most of the route was actually maintained by Chautauqua County. The only section of the route that was maintained by the New York State Department of Transportation was the portion between NY 424 in Stockton and US 20 in Brocton. NY 380's short overlap with US 20 in Brocton was also state-maintained.

On April 1, 1980, ownership and maintenance of NY 380's lone independent, state-maintained portion from NY 424 to the east end of its overlap with US 20 was transferred from the state of New York to Chautauqua County as part of a highway maintenance swap between the two levels of government. The county also assumed maintenance of NY 424, NY 428, and two reference routes in Dunkirk and Fredonia in the swap. In exchange, the state received ownership and maintenance of NY 394 between US 20 and NY 5 in the town of Westfield, US 62 from NY 60 to NY 394 through the hamlet of Frewsburg, and Forest Avenue from the Pennsylvania state line in Busti to NY 60 in Jamestown. Forest Avenue became NY 952P, an unsigned reference route.

Although the entirety of NY 380 was now maintained by Chautauqua County, save for the portion that overlapped US 20 in Brocton, the NY 380 designation remained in place until August 7, 1980, when it was redesignated as CR 380. Unlike NY 380, CR 380 continues south from the hamlet of Kimball Stand, intersecting NY 394 in Falconer and passing through the hamlet of Stillwater to the town of Busti, where it ends at Forest Avenue in the hamlet of Busti 15 miles (24 km) south of Kimball Stand. The highways that comprise the "extension" of the 380 designation were already county routes prior to 1980. A small portion of NY 380's routing in Kimball Stand is now part of CR 44.

== Major intersections ==
The entire route was in Chautauqua County.

Location	mi	km	Destinations	Notes
Gerry	0.00	0.00	NY 60	Hamlet of Kimball Stand
Stockton	12.40	19.96	NY 424	Western terminus of NY 424; now CR 58
Brocton	20.62	33.18	US 20 east	Eastern terminus of US 20 / NY 380 overlap
Brocton	20.93	33.68	US 20 west	Western terminus of US 20 / NY 380 overlap
Portland	22.98	36.98	NY 5	
1.000 mi = 1.609 km; 1.000 km = 0.621 mi

== See also ==
- List of county routes in Chautauqua County, New York
