= Gerry, New York =

- Town
- Location within Chautauqua County and New York state

- Location within New York Location within the United States
- Coordinates: 42°13′27″N 79°14′18″W
- Country: United States
- State: New York
- County: Chautauqua

Government
  - Type: Town Council
  - Town Supervisor: John R. Crossley (R)
  - Town Council: Members' List: • Gary J. Swan (R); • Linda Bartholomew (R); • Robert B. Heitzenrater (R); • Richard C. Heath (R)

Area
  - Total: 36.14 sq mi (93.61 km^{2})
  - Land: 36.12 sq mi (93.56 km^{2})
  - Water: 0.019 sq mi (0.05 km^{2})
- Elevation: 1,683 ft (513 m)

Population (2020)
  - Total: 1,789
  - Estimate (2021): 1,775
  - Density: 51.4/sq mi (19.83/km^{2})
- Time zone: UTC-5 (Eastern (EST))
  - Summer (DST): UTC-4 (EDT)
- ZIP Codes: 14740 (Gerry); 14782 (Sinclairville); 14701 (Jamestown); 14733 (Falconer)
- Area code: 716
- FIPS code: 36-013-28838
- GNIS feature ID: 0978999
- Website: www.gerryny.us

Gerry is a town in Chautauqua County, New York, United States. The population was 1,789 at the 2020 census. The town is named after Elbridge Gerry, the fifth Vice President of the United States. The town is centrally located in the county and is north of Jamestown.

== History ==
Settlement began circa 1810 with Amos Atkins, a surveyor, who built the first building, a log cabin. The town of Gerry was formed on June 1, 1812, from a part of the town of Pomfret. The first town meeting was held at the home of Major Samuel Sinclair, who was elected the first Supervisor that year. Sinclair is also the namesake of Sinclairville, located within the town.

The size of the town was reduced by the formation of the newer towns of Ellington and Charlotte. By 1900, the population of Gerry was 1,198.

Gerry is best known for hosting an annual rodeo (which has been an annual event in the town since 1945) and a Scandinavian folk festival, both of which are held in the summer.

== Geography ==
According to the United States Census Bureau, the town has a total area of 36.1 square miles (93.6 km^{2}), of which 0.02 square miles (0.05 km^{2}), or 0.05%, is water.

New York State Route 60 is a major north-south highway, and Chautauqua County Route 380 cuts through the southwest corner of the town.

=== Adjacent towns and areas ===
(Clockwise)

- Charlotte
- Ellington
- Ellicott
- Ellery; Stockton

== Demographics ==
Historical population
Census	Pop.	Note	%±
1820	947		—
1830	1,110		17.2%
1840	1,288		16.0%
1850	1,332		3.4%
1860	1,315		−1.3%
1870	1,096		−16.7%
1880	1,175		7.2%
1890	1,088		−7.4%
1900	1,198		10.1%
1910	1,155		−3.6%
1920	993		−14.0%
1930	1,112		12.0%
1940	1,073		−3.5%
1950	1,347		25.5%
1960	1,468		9.0%
1970	1,636		11.4%
1980	2,022		23.6%
1990	2,147		6.2%
2000	2,054		−4.3%
2010	1,905		−7.3%
2020	1,789		−6.1%
2021 (est.)	1,775		−0.8%
U.S. Decennial Census

As of the census of 2000, there were 2,054 people, 661 households, and 499 families residing in the town. The population density was 56.8 inhabitants per square mile (21.9/km^{2}). There were 739 housing units at an average density of 20.4 per square mile (7.9/km^{2}). The racial makeup of the town was 98.44% White, 0.39% African American, 0.24% Native American, 0.05% Asian, 0.34% from other races, and 0.54% from two or more races. Hispanic or Latino of any race were 0.68% of the population.

There were 661 households, out of which 34.2% had children under the age of 18 living with them, 60.7% were married couples living together, 8.3% had a female householder with no husband present, and 24.5% were non-families. 19.2% of all households were made up of individuals, and 9.1% had someone living alone who was 65 years of age or older. The average household size was 2.66 and the average family size was 2.98.

In the town, the population was spread out, with 23.3% under the age of 18, 6.2% from 18 to 24, 25.2% from 25 to 44, 20.4% from 45 to 64, and 24.9% who were 65 years of age or older. The median age was 42 years. For every 100 females, there were 87.8 males. For every 100 females age 18 and over, there were 84.1 males.

The median income for a household in the town was $35,000, and the median income for a family was $36,853. Males had a median income of $28,750 versus $18,667 for females. The per capita income for the town was $15,272. About 9.8% of families and 12.8% of the population were below the poverty line, including 14.2% of those under age 18 and 10.5% of those age 65 or over.

As of the 2010 Census, there were 1,905 people, a decrease of 7.25%, and 722 households, an increase of 9.23%, in the town. The population density was 52.6 inhabitants per square mile (20.3/km^{2}). The racial makeup of the town was 97.9% (1,805 people) white, 0.16% (3 people) African-American, 0.47% (9 people) Asian, 0.21% (4 people) Native American/Alaskan, 0.05% (1 person) other, and 1.21% (23 people) two or more races. The Hispanic/Latino makeup of the town of any race was 1.05% (20 people).

There were 722 households in the town, out of which 29.5% (213 households) had people under the age of 18 living in them.

Males made up 47.87% (912 people) of the population while females made up 52.13% (993 people) of the population. 19.74% (376 people) of the population was under the age of 18, 2.73% (52 people) were ages 18 and 19, 4.72% (90 people) ages 20–24, 9.08% (173 people) ages 25–34, 20.21% (385 people) ages 35–49, 20.47% (390 people) ages 50–64, and 23.05% (439 people) were over the age of 65.

== Communities and locations in Gerry ==
- Cassadaga Creek – A stream flowing southward through the western part of the town; tributary of Conewango Creek and part of the Allegheny River watershed.
- Gerry – A hamlet located on County Roads 50 and 65, and New York State Route 60, east of Hatch Creek. It was first called Bucklins Corners, after a hotel, and later called "Vermont", a designation stemming from the source of many early settlers, until 1876.
- Hatch Creek – A stream that flows into Cassadaga Creek in the southwest corner of the town.
- Kimball Stand – A hamlet in the southwest corner of the town on NY Routes 60 and 380 and County Road 44.
- Sinclairville – Part of the village of Sinclairville is by the north town line.
- Towerville – A hamlet at the west town line on NY Route 380 and County Road 48.

== Notable people ==
- Hugh Bedient, former professional baseball player
- John Schofield, former Secretary of War and US Civil War figure
