= Forestville, New York =

- Hamlet and CDP
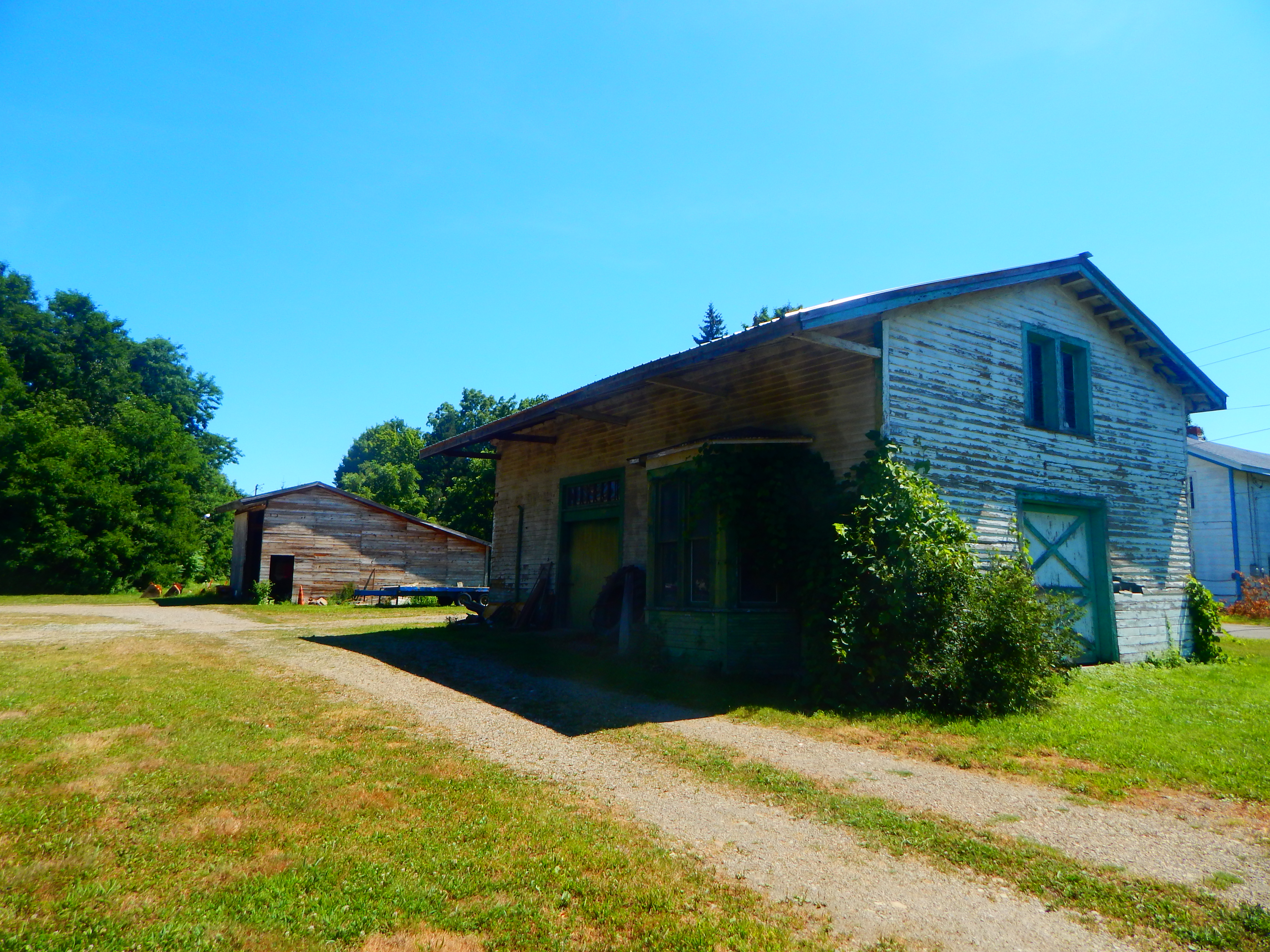
- The former Erie Railroad station in Forestville, seen in August 2015.

- Location within the state of New York
- Coordinates: 42°28′18″N 79°10′27″W
- Country: United States
- State: New York
- County: Chautauqua
- Town: Hanover
- Settled: 1808
- Incorporated: 1848
- Dissolved: December 31, 2016

Area
  - Total: 1.05 sq mi (2.73 km^{2})
  - Land: 1.05 sq mi (2.73 km^{2})
  - Water: 0 sq mi (0.00 km^{2})
- Elevation: 932 ft (284 m)

Population (2020)
  - Total: 704
  - Density: 667.0/sq mi (257.52/km^{2})
- Time zone: UTC-5 (Eastern (EST))
  - Summer (DST): UTC-4 (EDT)
- ZIP code: 14062
- Area code: 716
- FIPS code: 36-26649
- GNIS feature ID: 0950437

Forestville is a hamlet (and census-designated place) in Chautauqua County, New York, United States. The population was 697 at the 2010 census. The hamlet is within the town of Hanover and in the northeast part of the county. It was an incorporated village from 1848 to 2016.

== History ==
The first settlers were the Tupper brothers in 1805. The community began in 1808 as "Walnut Falls". Also known as "Moore's Hills," the name was changed to "Forestville" in 1820. The village was incorporated in 1848.

The "Bell Tower" at the high school is the oldest standing brick structure in the north county. The Bell Tower landmark was re-constructed in the early 2000s by Forestville Central School. A barn or carriage house located at 29 Lodi Street is the oldest standing wooden structure in northern Chautauqua County.

In 2015, following emergency loans from the county, the inhabitants were called to vote on the dissolution of the village. Dissolution was approved by a 137–97 vote. The Village of Forestville was officially dissolved on December 31, 2016.

On July 10, 2024, during an outbreak caused by the remnants of Hurricane Beryl, a tornado touched down and caused EF1 damage mostly along Henry and Putnam roads.

== Notable people ==
- George Abbott, Broadway producer and playwright, was born in Forestville on June 25, 1887. A New York State historical marker honoring Abbott was placed on Main Street and unveiled by the Hanover Historian Vincent P. Martonis on June 25, 2008.
- Edgar Anderson, botanist
- Cyrus D. Angell, major landowner in Forestville and surrounding area in the 19th century; noted for developing the Belt Theory of oil discovery, that oil existed in "belts" akin to underground rivers, giving rise to the practice of "Yardstick Geology". A number of local landmarks along Angell Road are named after Cyrus D. Angell.
- Emily Montague Mulkin Bishop (1858-1916), Delsartean lecturer, instructor, author
- William J. Colvill, Union colonel in the American Civil War who led the 1st Minnesota Volunteer Infantry in the Battle of Gettysburg, former Minnesota Attorney General and US congressman from Minnesota
- Les Dye, former NFL player
- Carol J. Adams, writer, feminist, and animal rights activist

== Geography ==
Forestville is in the southwest part of the town of Hanover at 42°28′18″N 79°10′27″W (42.471658, -79.174028).

According to the United States Census Bureau, the hamlet has a total area of 0.97 square miles (2.5 km^{2}), all land. Walnut Creek is joined by Tupper Brook north of the hamlet and flows northward to Lake Erie.

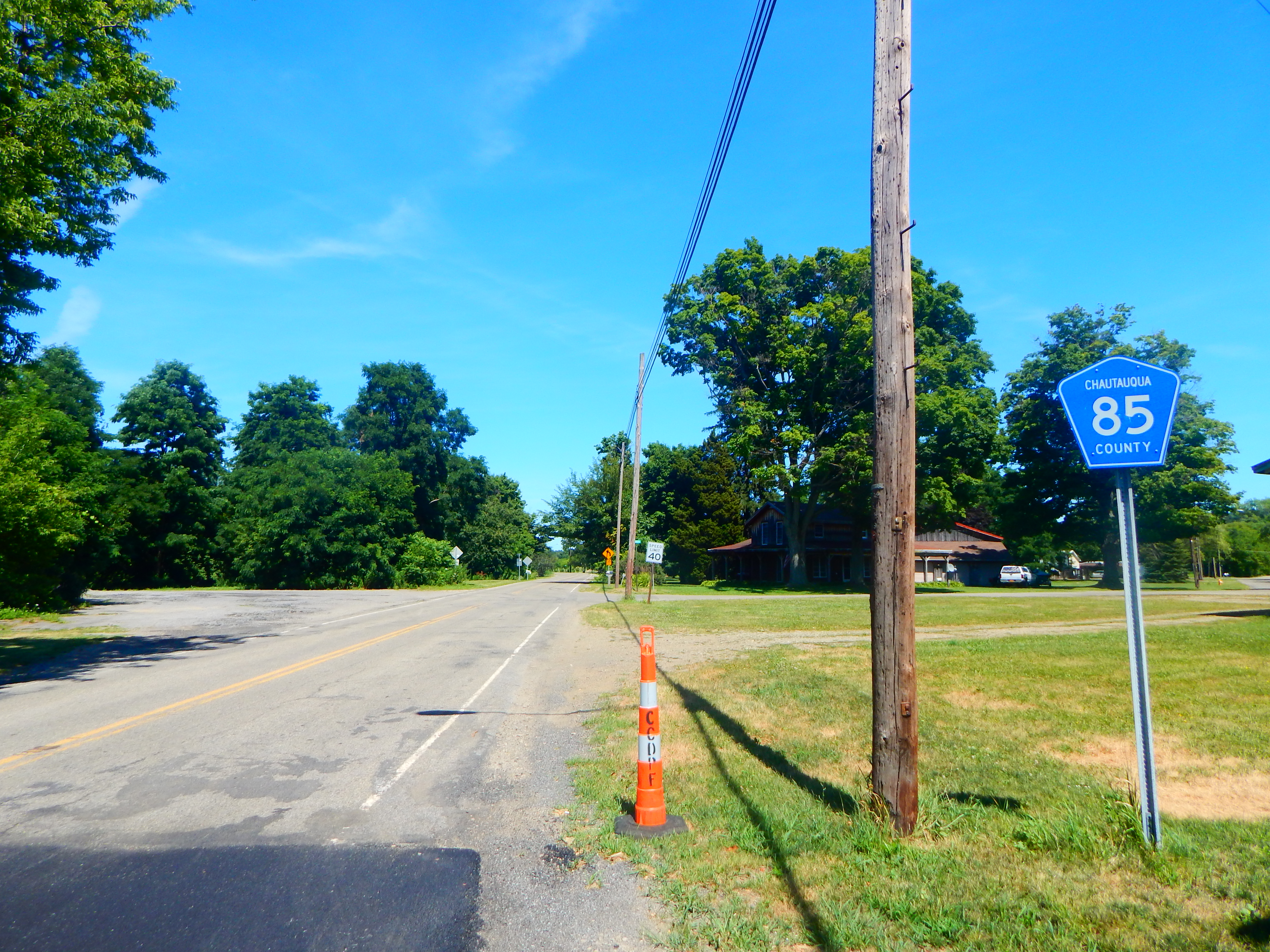
CR 85 at the Forestville–Hanover line

New York State Route 39 passes east–west through the hamlet as its main street and intersects county routes 85, 87, and 89. Route 39 leads east 12 miles (19 km) to Gowanda. Fredonia is 8 miles (13 km) to the west via Route 39 and U.S. Route 20.

== Demographics ==
Historical population
Census	Pop.	Note	%±
1860	574		—
1870	722		25.8%
1880	724		0.3%
1890	788		8.8%
1900	623		−20.9%
1910	721		15.7%
1920	620		−14.0%
1930	677		9.2%
1940	692		2.2%
1950	786		13.6%
1960	905		15.1%
1970	908		0.3%
1980	804		−11.5%
1990	738		−8.2%
2000	770		4.3%
2010	697		−9.5%
2020	704		1.0%
U.S. Decennial Census

As of the census of 2000, there were 770 people, 304 households, and 209 families residing in what was then a village. The population density was 787.9123 inhabitants per square mile (304.2146/km^{2}). There were 324 housing units at an average density of 331.5 per square mile (128.0/km^{2}). The racial makeup of the village was 95.45% White, 0.26% African American, 1.04% Native American, 1.43% from other races, and 1.82% from two or more races. Hispanic or Latino of any race were 2.47% of the population. Of note, there is an estimated 91% of the population that is classified as "white".

There were 304 households, out of which 30.3% had children under the age of 18 living with them, 51.0% were married couples living together, 11.8% had a female householder with no husband present, and 31.3% were non-families. 25.0% of all households were made up of individuals, and 10.5% had someone living alone who was 65 years of age or older. The average household size was 2.51 and the average family size was 2.99.

In the village, the population was spread out, with 25.5% under the age of 18, 6.9% from 18 to 24, 28.7% from 25 to 44, 24.0% from 45 to 64, and 14.9% who were 65 years of age or older. The median age was 37 years. For every 100 females, there were 104.2 males. For every 100 females age 18 and over, there were 97.9 males.

The median income for a household in the village was $32,778, and the median income for a family was $41,042. Males had a median income of $32,159 versus $25,139 for females. The per capita income for the village was $15,993. About 4.8% of families and 10.2% of the population were below the poverty line, including 12.0% of those under age 18 and 18.1% of those age 65 or over.

== Events ==
The Forestville Fall Festival, formerly known as the Forestville Apple Festival, is held yearly, the first weekend in October. It features products from the apple harvest, a craft fair, parade, special events, and a harvest dinner.
