= Sinclairville, New York =

- Village
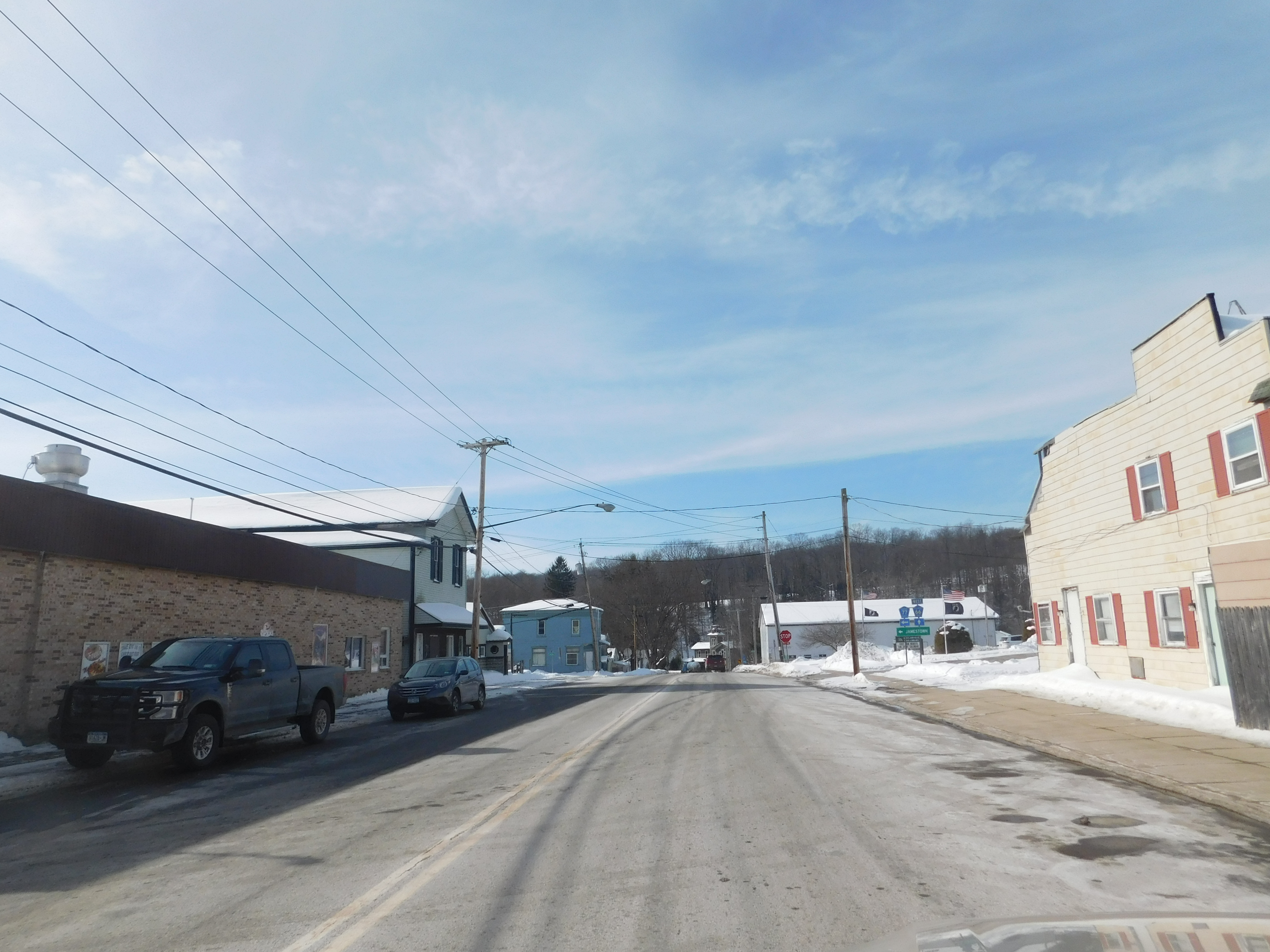
- Downtown Sinclairville seen on County Route 77

- Location within the state of New York
- Coordinates: 42°15′44″N 79°15′43″W
- Country: United States
- State: New York
- County: Chautauqua
- Towns: Charlotte, Gerry

Area
  - Total: 1.63 sq mi (4.21 km^{2})
  - Land: 1.63 sq mi (4.21 km^{2})
  - Water: 0 sq mi (0.00 km^{2})
- Elevation: 1,401 ft (427 m)

Population (2020)
  - Total: 579
  - Density: 356.6/sq mi (137.68/km^{2})
- Time zone: UTC-5 (Eastern (EST))
  - Summer (DST): UTC-4 (EDT)
- ZIP code: 14782
- Area code: 716
- FIPS code: 36-67488
- GNIS feature ID: 0965303
- Website: www.villageofsinclairvilleny.org

Sinclairville is a village in Chautauqua County, New York, United States. The population was 578 at the 2020 census. The village is named after Major Samuel Sinclear, its founder. Sinclairville is north of Jamestown and is on the border of the towns of Charlotte and Gerry.

== History ==
The village was founded in 1809 after the American Revolutionary War by Major Samuel Sinclear as "Sinclearville". The area was previously inhabited for hundreds of years by the Seneca people of the Iroquois Confederacy (Haudenosaunee) who, as allies of the British during the war, were forced to cede most of their lands to the United States and New York state. Most of the Iroquois migrated to Upper Canada, where they were given lands by the Crown.

The village of Sinclairville was incorporated in 1887. Sinclairville is referred to by residents as "the heart of Chautauqua County".

== Notable people ==
- Martha Angle Dorsett (1851–1918), first female attorney in Minnesota, wife of Charles Dorsett
- George Burritt Sennett (1840–1900), ichthyologist and ornithologist
- Rexford Tugwell (1891–1979), economist and New Deal theoretician, governor of Puerto Rico (1941–1946).

== Geography ==
Sinclairville is located in east-central Chautauqua County at 42°15′44″N 79°15′43″W (42.262227, -79.261975). The center of the village, along with approximately two-thirds of its area, are in the town of Charlotte, while the southern third is in the town of Gerry.

According to the United States Census Bureau, the village has a total area of 1.6 square miles (4.2 km^{2}), all land.

Mill Creek, a tributary of Cassadaga Creek, runs through the town. Via Cassadaga Creek and then Conewango Creek, the village is part of the Allegheny River watershed.

The village is at the intersection of County Roads 64, 66 and 77. Jamestown on Chautauqua Lake is 12 miles (19 km) to the south, and Dunkirk on Lake Erie is 18 miles (29 km) to the north.

== Demographics ==
Historical population
Census	Pop.	Note	%±
1880	540		—
1890	510		−5.6%
1900	577		13.1%
1910	542		−6.1%
1920	514		−5.2%
1930	589		14.6%
1940	585		−0.7%
1950	672		14.9%
1960	726		8.0%
1970	772		6.3%
1980	772		0.0%
1990	708		−8.3%
2000	665		−6.1%
2010	588		−11.6%
2020	579		−1.5%
2021 (est.)	575	▼	−0.7%
U.S. Decennial Census

At the 2000 census there were 665 people, 268 households, and 173 families in the village. The population density was 412.1 inhabitants per square mile (159.1/km^{2}). There were 292 housing units at an average density of 180.9 per square mile (69.8/km^{2}). The racial makeup of the village was 97.74% White, 0.15% African American, 0.45% Native American, 0.45% Asian, 0.15% from other races, and 1.05% from two or more races. Hispanic or Latino of any race were 0.90%.

Of the 268 households, 29.9% had children under the age of 18 living with them, 51.9% were married couples living together, 9.0% had a female householder with no husband present, and 35.1% were non-families. 29.5% of households were one person and 18.7% were one person aged 65 or older. The average household size was 2.48 and the average family size was 3.05.

The age distribution was 26.2% under the age of 18, 9.0% from 18 to 24, 26.2% from 25 to 44, 22.0% from 45 to 64, and 16.7% 65 or older. The median age was 36 years. For every 100 females, there were 94.4 males. For every 100 females age 18 and over, there were 88.8 males.

The median household income was $26,625 and the median family income was $32,955. Males had a median income of $34,167 versus $23,958 for females. The per capita income for the village was $14,415. About 21.2% of families and 22.6% of the population were below the poverty line, including 31.7% of those under age 18 and 21.5% of those age 65 or over.

At the 2010 census, there were 588 people (a decrease of 77 people or 11.58%) and 255 households (a decrease of 13 households or 4.85%). The age distribution was 22.62% of the population under the age of 18, 3.23% of the population ages 18 and 19, 6.80% ages 20–24, 10.03% ages 25–34, 21.77% ages 35–49, 20.41% ages 50–64, and 15.14% of the population over the age of 65. Out of the population, 50.51% (297 people) were male and 49.49% (291 people) were female.
