= Cassadaga, New York =

Village in the United States

- Village
- Location within the state of New York
- Coordinates: 42°20.5′N 79°17.9′W
- Country: United States
- State: New York
- County: Chautauqua
- Town: Stockton

Area
  - Total: 1.06 sq mi (2.75 km^{2})
  - Land: 0.85 sq mi (2.19 km^{2})
  - Water: 0.22 sq mi (0.56 km^{2})
- Elevation: 1,339 ft (408 m)

Population (2020)
  - Total: 573
  - Density: 677.6/sq mi (261.64/km^{2})
- Time zone: UTC-5 (Eastern (EST))
  - Summer (DST): UTC-4 (EDT)
- ZIP code: 14718
- Area code: 716
- FIPS code: 36-12749
- GNIS feature ID: 0945970
- Website: cassadaganewyork.org

Cassadaga (Seneca for 'water beneath the rocks') is a village in Chautauqua County, New York, United States. The village is located within the northeast corner of the town of Stockton, east of the hamlet of Stockton, south of and immediately adjacent to Lily Dale in the town of Pomfret, and north of the village of Sinclairville. As of the 2020 census, the population of Cassadaga was 569.

== History ==
Cassadaga is a Seneca name meaning 'water under the rocks', descriptive of the natural springs of the area flowing from glacial moraines. In dry weather, many of the local streams "disappear", and the spring-fed water runs wholly within the gravelly bottoms of the stream beds draining from the surrounding hills.

Cassadaga was settled by European Americans in 1848 at the headwaters of the technically navigable Cassadaga Creek. Practically, the upper few miles of it are not navigable in the 21st century, due to numerous shallows and beaver activity along its course. Many of the settlers had migrated from New England and eastern New York after the American Revolutionary War. They gradually migrated westward as this territory was opened up for settlement after the Seneca people and other Iroquois League tribes had been forced out of the state after the war.

The village was formally incorporated in 1921.

Early settlers harvested the abundant and large trees (some exceeding 5 feet (1.5 m) in diameter) as a primary source of income. They shipped them downstream to markets via log rafts and flatboats on the creek as timber, charcoal and pearl ash, the latter two products in demand in the early Industrial Age.

The Dunkirk, Allegheny Valley and Pittsburgh Railroad, which laid track from Dunkirk, New York, and eventually to Warren, Pennsylvania, was constructed on the west side of the Cassadaga Lakes in the spring of 1871. It also ran through the then adjoining hamlet of Burnhams, which was later annexed by the village. The railroad contributed greatly to the economy of the area, both as a source of population growth and visitors to the lakes and rolling hills for recreation, and for transportation of the forest and farm products of the area to urban centers.

Workers harvested ice from the lakes in winter for refrigeration, shipping it to other cities. The Webster Citizens Company ice house stood on the west shore of the Upper Lake, with a three-car rail siding to serve it, and was listed as a railroad business as late as 1931. The Cassadaga Spring Water Company had a siding on the Middle Lake where it bottled water from a leased spring on the north side of the Glenn Halladay farm for shipment by rail to city customers, primarily in Buffalo. It ceased operations by the late 1920s as municipal water supply systems improved. The rail line was abandoned after extensive flood damage near Sinclairville from Hurricane Agnes in 1972, and subsequently removed.

== Geography ==
Cassadaga is located on the northwestern edge of the Allegheny Plateau in western New York at 42°20'29" north, 79°18'56" west (42.341343, -79.315653) at an elevation of approximately 1,340 feet (410 m) above sea level. The village is located at the south end of Lower Cassadaga Lake, Lily Dale being located on the east shore of Upper Cassadaga Lake, with a narrow "Middle Lake" connecting them. The mainly spring-fed lakes drain into Cassadaga Creek, running south and connecting to Conewango Creek, the Allegheny River, the Ohio River, and the Mississippi River flowing to the Gulf of Mexico, despite getting their start just 10 miles (16 km) south and east of Lake Erie, one of the Great Lakes, which drain via the Saint Lawrence River east to the Atlantic Ocean. The watershed divide is located less than 2 miles (3 km) north of the village.

According to the United States Census Bureau, Cassadaga has a total area of 1.0 square mile (2.7 km^{2}), of which 0.85 square miles (2.2 km^{2}) is land and 0.23 square miles (0.6 km^{2}), or 20.59%, is water.

The soils are glacial in nature, ranging from deep gravel loams in the valleys to heavy clays on the hill tops. Springs are fairly common, though somewhat high in mineral content (calcium, sulphur and iron, depending greatly on location).

New York State Route 60, the principal north-south route through Chautauqua County, runs through the village and intersects with U.S. Route 20, 7 miles (11 km) to the north at Fredonia, the New York State Thruway (Interstate 90) 8.5 miles (13.7 km) to the north at Dunkirk, and Interstate 86 17 miles (27 km) to the south at Jamestown.

== Demographics ==
Historical population
Census	Pop.	Note	%±
1860	151		—
1870	225		49.0%
1930	480		—
1940	514		7.1%
1950	676		31.5%
1960	820		21.3%
1970	905		10.4%
1980	821		−9.3%
1990	768		−6.5%
2000	676		−12.0%
2010	634		−6.2%
2020	573		−9.6%
2021 (est.)	564	▼	−1.6%
U.S. Decennial Census

As of the census of 2000, there were 676 people, 277 households, and 186 families residing in the village. The population density was 766.3 inhabitants per square mile (295.9/km^{2}). There were 315 housing units at an average density of 357.1 per square mile (137.9/km^{2}). The racial makeup of the village was 96.89% White, 0.30% Native American, 0.44% Asian, 1.04% from other races, and 1.33% from two or more races. Hispanic or Latino of any race were 2.66% of the population.

Of the 277 village households, 26.4% had children under the age of 18 living with them, 61.0% were married couples living together, 5.1% had a female householder with no husband present, and 32.5% were non-families. 28.2% of all households were made up of individuals, and 15.9% had someone living alone who was 65 years of age or older. The average household size was 2.44 and the average family size was 3.04.

The ages of population are well spread out, with 22.8% under the age of 18, 5.9% from 18 to 24, 28.3% from 25 to 44, 25.1% from 45 to 64, and 17.9% who were 65 years of age or older. The median age was 42 years. For every 100 females, there were 101.8 males. For every 100 females age 18 and over, there were 96.2 males.

The median income for a household in the village was $43,359, and the median income for a family was $52,500. Males had a median income of $32,083 versus $21,500 for females. The per capita income for the village was $20,361. About 1.6% of families and 2.4% of the population were below the poverty line, including 1.3% of those under age 18 and none of those age 65 or over.

As of the 2010 census, the population was 634 (a decrease of 42 people or 6.21%) and there was 267 households (a decrease of 10 households or 3.61%). The population density of the village was 704.4 people per square mile (275.7/km^{2}). The racial makeup of the village was: 98.27% (623 people) white; 0.16% (1 person) African-American; 0.32% (2 people) Asian; 0.16% (1 person) Native American/Alaskan; and 1.10% (7 people) of two or more races. Out of the whole population, 0.79% (5 people) were of Hispanic/Latino origin.

The ages of the population are 21.92% (139 people) under the age of 18; 2.37% (15 people) ages 18 and 19; 4.89% (31 people) ages 20–24; 7.73% (49 people) ages 25–34; 19.24% (122 people) ages 35–49; 24.13% (153 people) ages 50–64; and 19.72% (125 people) over the age of 65. Of the population, 50.16% (318 people) were male and 49.84% (316 people) were female.

There are two churches in the village proper, one Catholic and the other Baptist, reflecting the religious heritages of the early area settlers, though there are Amish and Mennonites in the immediate area and those of other beliefs as well. The Catholic church has reduced its services, now being used rarely.

The village and environs are served by a volunteer fire department and ambulance squad, and are part of the County Mutual Aid Plan.

== Recreation ==
The Cassadaga Lakes contain a variety of fish including bass, carp, crappie, muskellunge, northern pike, perch, trout and walleye. New York State Department of Environmental Conservation (DEC) regular and special regulations apply, and with very few exceptions, a New York fishing license is required. As of 2007, live bait must not be transported to or from other areas, and when State certified and sold for local use, they are to be used or disposed of locally to prevent the potential spread of diseases.

Hunting both small and large game is a popular activity for visitors and area residents, partially as evidenced by the Fire Department's annual gun raffle held in April, which has on average raffled about 250 firearms each year for the past 14 years (as of 2007). State laws apply for firearm possession and transfers, and again, DEC regulations apply and licenses are required for hunting.

There is a free public boat launch maintained by the DEC on the north end of the middle lake with parking for vehicles and trailers, though the lakes are small enough to be paddled or rowed, and motor boat speed through much of the middle lake is limited to 5 mph (8 km/h).

There is a walking / jogging path around the lower and middle lakes (on the road shoulders) that is about 3 miles (5 km) in length.

There is a public beach on the southeast side of the lower lake off Park Avenue in the village that is generally open from mid June (when the water warms sufficiently) until Labor Day, that has a lifeguard on duty and is free for all. There is a basketball court adjoining the beach that is open approximately dawn to dusk when weather allows.

Cassadaga is along the route of two snowmobile trails that connect with over 100 miles (160 km) of marked and groomed trails in the county for winter riding. State Department of Motor Vehicles regulations apply.

== Notable people ==
- Milton Earl Beebe, architect
- Roxanne Pulitzer, one-time wife of Herbert Pulitzer until their famous divorce in 1983; lived in Cassadaga as a child
