= North Harmony, New York =

- Town
- Location within Chautauqua County and New York state

- Location within New York Location within the United States
- Coordinates: 42°8′3″N 79°26′16″W
- Country: United States
- State: New York
- County: Chautauqua

Government
  - Type: Town Council
  - Town Supervisor: Sally P. Carlson (R)
  - Town Council: Members' List: • Frank Stow (R); • Ralph I. Whitney (R); • Richard Sena (R); • Arthur C. Thomas (R)

Area
  - Total: 42.15 sq mi (109.18 km^{2})
  - Land: 42.13 sq mi (109.12 km^{2})
  - Water: 0.023 sq mi (0.06 km^{2})
- Elevation: 1,473 ft (449 m)

Population (2020)
  - Total: 2,182
  - Estimate (2021): 2,172
  - Density: 52.2/sq mi (20.14/km^{2})
- Time zone: UTC-5 (Eastern (EST))
  - Summer (DST): UTC-4 (EDT)
- ZIP Codes: 14710 (Ashville); 14785 (Stow); 14757 (Mayville); 14767 (Panama); 14781 (Sherman)
- FIPS code: 36-013-52155
- GNIS feature ID: 0979288
- Website: townofnorthharmony.gov

North Harmony is a town in Chautauqua County, New York, United States. The population was 2,182 at the 2020 census. The town is on the west side of Chautauqua Lake. The shore of the lake is the location of many summer resort communities.

== History ==
The town of North Harmony was established on December 19, 1918, from part of the town of Harmony.

== Geography ==
According to the United States Census Bureau, North Harmony has a total area of 42.2 square miles (109.2 km^{2}), of which 0.023 square miles (0.06 km^{2}), or 0.05%, is water.

The Southern Tier Expressway (Interstate 86 and New York State Route 17) passes through the town. New York State Route 394 follows the west shore of Chautauqua Lake, and New York State Route 474 crosses the southeast part of the town.

=== Adjacent towns and areas ===
The eastern border of North Harmony is Lake Chautauqua. On the northern border is the town of Chautauqua. The western border is the town of Sherman. To the south are the towns of Clymer and Harmony. North Harmony shares a short border on its southeast corner with the town of Busti.

== Demographics ==
Historical population
Census	Pop.	Note	%±
1920	1,235		—
1930	1,462		18.4%
1940	1,453		−0.6%
1950	1,675		15.3%
1960	2,132		27.3%
1970	2,264		6.2%
1980	2,263		0.0%
1990	2,301		1.7%
2000	2,521		9.6%
2010	2,267		−10.1%
2020	2,182		−3.7%
2021 (est.)	2,172		−0.5%
U.S. Decennial Census

As of the census of 2000, there were 2,521 people, 927 households, and 724 families residing in the town. The population density was 59.8 inhabitants per square mile (23.1/km^{2}). There were 1,412 housing units at an average density of 33.5 per square mile (12.9/km^{2}). The racial makeup of the town was 98.85% White, 0.12% African American, 0.16% Native American, 0.04% Asian, 0.08% from other races, and 0.75% from two or more races. Hispanic or Latino of any race were 0.79% of the population.

There were 927 households, out of which 35.3% had children under the age of 18 living with them, 67.1% were married couples living together, 6.6% had a female householder with no husband present, and 21.8% were non-families. 18.7% of all households were made up of individuals, and 8.1% had someone living alone who was 65 years of age or older. The average household size was 2.72 and the average family size was 3.10.

In the town, the population was spread out, with 27.3% under the age of 18, 6.3% from 18 to 24, 26.2% from 25 to 44, 27.8% from 45 to 64, and 12.3% who were 65 years of age or older. The median age was 39 years. For every 100 females, there were 102.8 males. For every 100 females age 18 and over, there were 101.8 males.

The median income for a household in the town was $42,181, and the median income for a family was $47,614. Males had a median income of $34,375 versus $22,554 for females. The per capita income for the town was $18,795. About 7.2% of families and 9.7% of the population were below the poverty line, including 14.2% of those under age 18 and 9.1% of those age 65 or over.

== Communities and locations in North Harmony ==
- Ashville – A hamlet in the southeast corner of the town on NY Route 474.
- Bly Bay – A bay on the west side of Chautauqua Lake, south of Cheney's Point.
- Cheney's Point – A lake shore hamlet south of Hadley Bay on a headland called Cheney's Point.
- Connelly Park – A lake shore hamlet south of Hadley Bay.
- Elm Tree – A hamlet at the junction of the Southern Tier Expressway and County Road 33.
- Hadley Bay – A lake shore hamlet south of the Southern Tier Expressway.
- Long View – A lake shore hamlet south of Cheney's Point.
- Niets Crest – A hamlet south of Longview.
- Quigley Park – A hamlet near Cheney's Point.
- Stebbins Corners – A hamlet on the town line in the northwest corner of the town at the junction of County Roads 18 and 25.
- Stedman – A hamlet near the north town line at the junction of County Roads 18 and 33
- Stow – A lakeshore hamlet and resort village north of the Southern Tier Expressway
- Toms Point – A headland on Lake Chautauqua near Stow
- Victoria – A hamlet north of Stow
- Vukote – A hamlet where NY route 474 has its east end at NY route 394
- Warner Bay – A bay on the west side of Chautauqua Lake, south of Long View
- Woodlawn – A hamlet north of Stow
