= Blockville, New York =

- Hamlet
- Location within New York Location within the United States
- Coordinates: 42°4′54″N 79°24′44.1″W
- Country: United States
- State: New York
- County: Chautauqua
- Town: Harmony
- Time zone: UTC-5 (Eastern (EST))
  - Summer (DST): UTC-4 (EDT)
- ZIP Code: 14710 (Ashville)
- Area code: 716
- GNIS feature ID: 944268

Blockville is a hamlet located in western New York, United States, at the intersection of State Route 474 and County Route 35, between Panama and Ashville, in the town of Harmony in Chautauqua County. A Dollar General store is located in Blockville.
