= Loren B. Sessions =

American politician

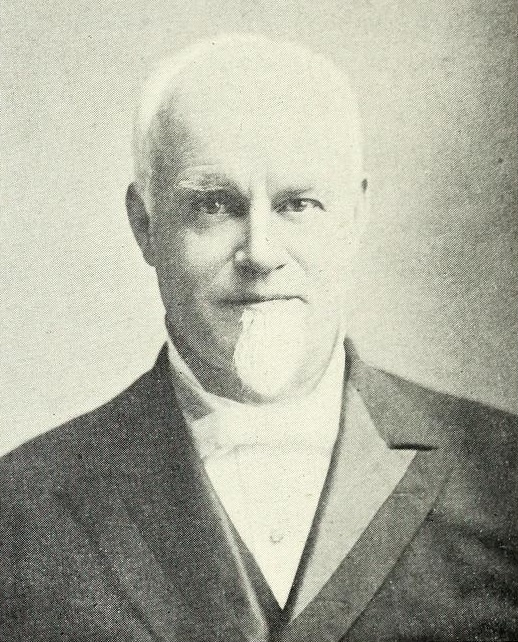
- From Volume 1 (1904) of The Centennial History of Chautauqua County

Member of the New York State Senate from the 32nd district
- In office January 1, 1878 – December 31, 1881
- Preceded by: Commodore P. Vedder
- Succeeded by: Norman M. Allen

Chairman of the Chautauqua County, New York Board of Supervisors
- In office 1875–1889
- Preceded by: F. B. Brewer
- Succeeded by: J. J. Aldrich

Town Supervisor of Harmony, New York
- In office 1873–1889
- Preceded by: Frank G. Steward
- Succeeded by: Jared Hewes
- In office 1865–1870
- Preceded by: Walter L. Sessions
- Succeeded by: Frank G. Steward

Personal details
- Born: October 12, 1827 Brandon, Vermont, U.S.
- Died: November 20, 1897 (aged 70) Panama, New York, U.S.
- Party: Republican
- Spouse: Sarah Elizabeth (Burrows) Sessions (m. 1852–1880, her death)
- Children: 4
- Relatives: Walter L. Sessions (brother)
- Education: Albany Normal School (now University at Albany, SUNY)
- Profession: Attorney

Loren B. Sessions (October 12, 1827 – November 20, 1897) was an American lawyer and politician from New York. He was most notable for his service in the New York State Senate from 1878 to 1881.

== Life ==
Sessions was born in Brandon, Vermont on October 12, 1827, a son of John S. Sessions and Sally (Green) Sessions. Congressman Walter L. Sessions was his brother. His family moved to Clymer, New York in 1835, where Sessions attended the common schools, worked on his father's farm, and taught school. In 1846, he attended Westfield Academy, and in 1848 he graduated from Albany Normal School. He studied law with Lorenzo Morris in Mayville while continuing to teach school, was admitted to the bar in 1852, and practiced in Chautauqua County.

He was Deputy Clerk of the New York State Assembly in 1854, and Deputy Clerk of the New York State Senate in 1860. He was Town Supervisor of Harmony, New York from 1865 to 1870 and 1873 to 1889; and chairman of the Board of Supervisors of Chautauqua County for seven terms.

He was a member of the New York State Senate (32nd D.) from 1878 to 1881, sitting in the 101st, 102nd, 103rd and 104th New York State Legislatures. In 1883, he was indicted and tried, for having attempted to bribe Assemblyman Samuel H. Bradley during the United States Senate special elections in New York, 1881. He was acquitted at his trial. Sessions died Panama, New York on November 20, 1897.

== Sources ==
- Civil List and Constitutional History of the Colony and State of New York compiled by Edgar Albert Werner (1884; pg. 291)
- The State Government for 1879 by Charles G. Shanks (Weed, Parsons & Co, Albany NY, 1879; pg. 71f)
- THE LOREN B. SESSIONS CASE in NYT on October 3, 1883
- LOREN B. SESSIONS ACQUITTED in NYT on October 19, 1883
- DEATH LIST OF A DAY; Loren B. Sessions in NYT on November 21, 1897
- History of Harmony, NY transcribed from History of Chautauqua County, New York and Its People by John P. Downs & Fenwick Y. Hedley (1921), at Ray's Place

New York State Senate
| Preceded by Commodore P. Vedder | New York State Senate; 32nd District; 1878–1881 | Succeeded by Norman M. Allen |
