= Senator Sessions (disambiguation) =

Jeff Sessions (born 1946) was a U.S. Senator from Alabama from 1997 to 2017.

Senator Sessions may also refer to:

- David Sessions (fl. 2010s), Alabama State Senate
- Kathryn Sessions (born 1942), Wyoming State Senate
- Loren B. Sessions (1827–1897), New York State Senate
- Milan H. Sessions (1821–1898), Wisconsin State Senate
- Walter L. Sessions (1820–1896), New York State Senate
