= Mayville station =

Mayville station may refer to:

- Mayville station (New York), a historic Pennsylvania Railroad train station
- Mayville station (North Dakota), a historic Great Northern Railway train station
- Mayville station (Michigan), a Chesapeake and Ohio Railway train station

== See also ==
- Maysville station, an Amtrak train station in Kentucky
