= Harmony, New York =

- Town
- Location within Chautauqua County and New York state

- Location within New York Location within the United States
- Coordinates: 42°3′30″N 79°26′30″W
- Country: United States
- State: New York
- County: Chautauqua

Government
  - Type: Town Council
  - Town Supervisor: Todd Eddy (R)
  - Town Council: Members' List: • Mark Stow (R); • Michael Sard (R); • William A. Lawson (R); • Beverley M. Lubi (R)

Area
  - Total: 45.56 sq mi (118.00 km^{2})
  - Land: 45.40 sq mi (117.58 km^{2})
  - Water: 0.16 sq mi (0.42 km^{2})
- Elevation: 1,699 ft (518 m)

Population (2020)
  - Total: 2,108
  - Estimate (2021): 2,088
  - Density: 46.4/sq mi (17.91/km^{2})
- Time zone: UTC-5 (Eastern (EST))
  - Summer (DST): UTC-4 (EDT)
- ZIP Codes: 14767 (Panama); 14710 (Ashville)
- FIPS code: 36-013-32248
- GNIS feature ID: 0979048
- Website: www.harmonyny.gov

Harmony is a town in Chautauqua County, New York, United States. The population was 2,108 at the 2020 census. The town is on the south border of the county and southwest of Jamestown.

== History ==
First settlement began circa 1809. Harmony was established in 1816 from a part of the town of Chautauqua. The size of Harmony was reduced when the newer towns of Busti and North Harmony were formed.

== Geography ==
According to the United States Census Bureau, the town has a total area of 45.6 square miles (118.0 km^{2}), of which 45.4 square miles (117.6 km^{2}) is land and 0.15 square miles (0.4 km^{2}), or 0.35%, is water.

New York State Route 474 is a major east-west highway through the north part of the town.

=== Adjacent towns and regions ===
Harmony is bordered to the south by Columbus Township, the borough of Bear Lake, Freehold Township, and Sugar Grove Township, all in Warren County, Pennsylvania. The town to the north is North Harmony. On the east is the town of Busti, and on the west is the town of Clymer.

== Demographics ==
Historical population
Census	Pop.	Note	%±
1820	845		—
1830	1,988		135.3%
1840	3,340		68.0%
1850	3,749		12.2%
1860	3,606		−3.8%
1870	3,416		−5.3%
1880	3,455		1.1%
1890	3,174		−8.1%
1900	2,988		−5.9%
1910	2,847		−4.7%
1920	1,443		−49.3%
1930	1,425		−1.2%
1940	1,473		3.4%
1950	1,736		17.9%
1960	1,797		3.5%
1970	1,922		7.0%
1980	2,121		10.4%
1990	2,177		2.6%
2000	2,339		7.4%
2010	2,206		−5.7%
2020	2,108		−4.4%
2021 (est.)	2,088		−0.9%
U.S. Decennial Census

As of the census of 2000, there were 2,339 people, 837 households, and 662 families residing in the town. The population density was 51.4 inhabitants per square mile (19.8/km^{2}). There were 931 housing units at an average density of 20.5 per square mile (7.9/km^{2}). The racial makeup of the town was 97.95% White, 0.38% African American, 0.26% Native American, 0.09% Asian, 0.13% from other races, and 1.20% from two or more races. Hispanic or Latino of any race were 0.47% of the population.

There were 837 households, out of which 37.6% had children under the age of 18 living with them, 67.5% were married couples living together, 8.6% had a female householder with no husband present, and 20.9% were non-families. 16.8% of all households were made up of individuals, and 8.0% had someone living alone who was 65 years of age or older. The average household size was 2.79 and the average family size was 3.15.

In the town, the population was spread out, with 28.7% under the age of 18, 7.6% from 18 to 24, 27.9% from 25 to 44, 24.2% from 45 to 64, and 11.7% who were 65 years of age or older. The median age was 37 years. For every 100 females, there were 98.9 males. For every 100 females age 18 and over, there were 100.0 males.

The median income for a household in the town was $32,578, and the median income for a family was $39,167. Males had a median income of $31,927 versus $19,122 for females. The per capita income for the town was $15,292. About 8.6% of families and 10.6% of the population were below the poverty line, including 15.7% of those under age 18 and 3.9% of those age 65 or over.

== Communities and locations in the Town of Harmony ==
- Blockville – A hamlet near the north town line by the junction of County Road 35 and NY-474.
- Brokenstraw Creek – A stream which rises on the west side of the town; a tributary of the Allegheny River in Pennsylvania.
- Cherry Hill – A hamlet in the southeast corner of the town by the junction of County Roads 12 and 35.
- Kings Corners – A location at the west town line, west of Panama village on County Road 10.
- Little Brokenstraw Creek – A stream flowing southward through the west side of the town, joining Brokenstraw Creek in Pennsylvania.
- Niobe – A location in the southeast part of the town and west of Cherry Hill on County Road 12. This little hamlet was once serviced by the Pennsylvania Railroad. Mailbags were left twice daily by train slowing, while passing through, if not stopping for passengers, leaving mailbag (twice daily) hanging from the extended iron hook on the corner of the depot. The depot, named by the Pennsylvania Railroad, was Grant Station, New York. Around 1907/08, Postmaster J. Ray Barker decided to hold a contest to name the community. He wanted to stop the confusion caused by the PRR mistakenly leaving mailbags meant for Grant Station, Ohio (another depot on the same rail-line), and mailbags meant for Grant Station, NY left in Ohio. When Postmaster J. Ray Barker reported the contest results, it was Niobe to be the community's name. As told to Walter S. Barker, nephew of the postmaster, family members suspected that Uncle Ray was influenced by the Greek mythology he had been studying, as that subject was not likely studied by people in this remote rural area. The Barker family were early settlers of Harmony Township, with Postmaster's father having served in the Union Army of the Civil War [Private in T Company, 9th Regiment NY Cavalry, enlisted on August 10, 1864].
- North East Junction – A hamlet in the southeast part of the town
- Panama – The village of Panama is in the northwest part of the town on Route 474 and County Roads 10 and 33.
- Watts Flats – A hamlet by the eastern town and south of Blockville on County Road 35.

== References in popular culture ==
Harmony is the setting for The Twilight Zone episode "Once Upon a Time".

== Notable people ==
- J. Samuel Fowler, former New York state senator
- James H. McGraw, McGraw-Hill Publishing Company, born in Harmony
- Loren B. Sessions, former US congressman
- Walter L. Sessions, former US congressman
