= Smith Bly House =

Historic house in New York, United States

- U.S. National Register of Historic Places
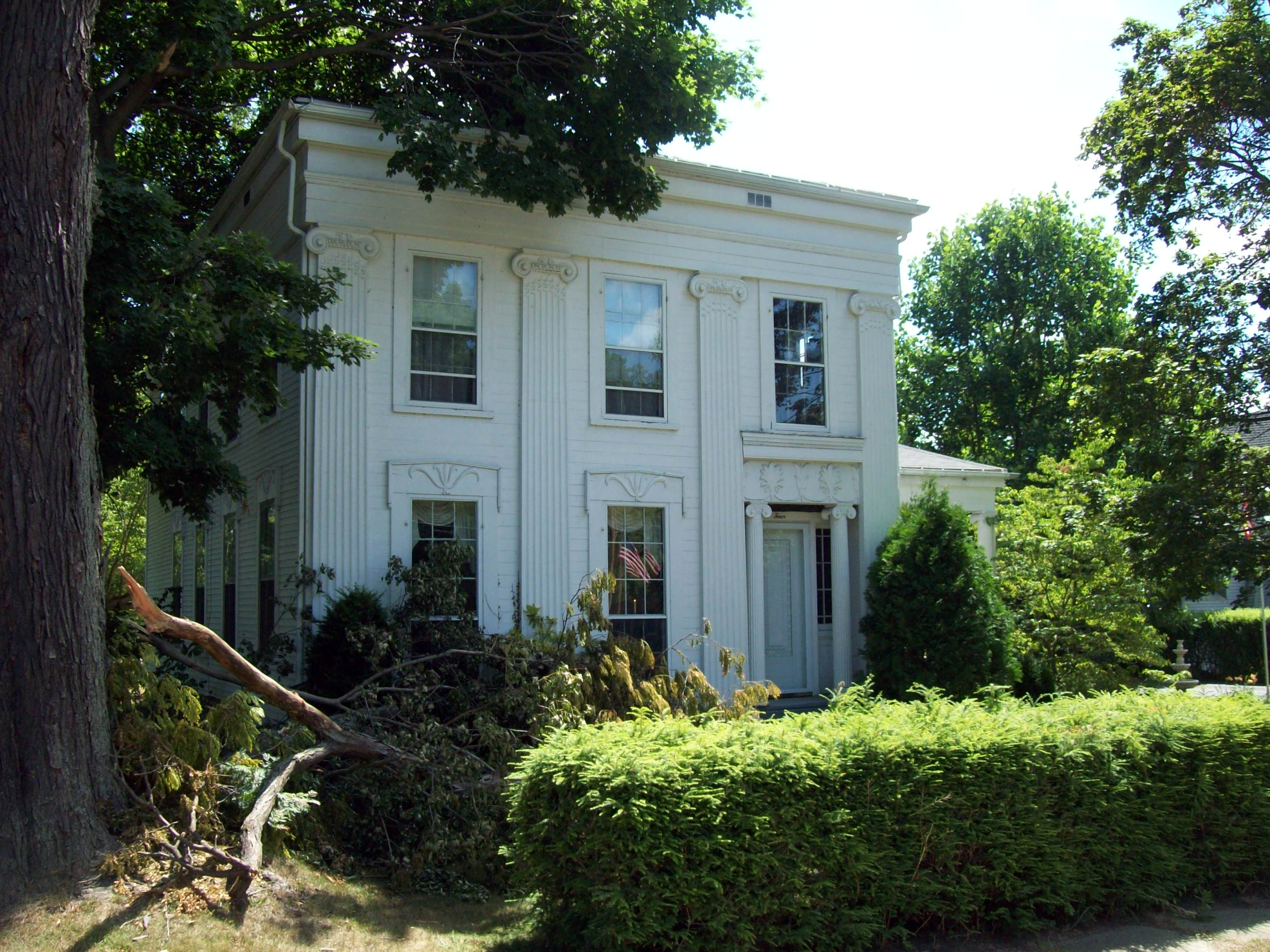
- Smith Bly House, July 2012

- Location within New York Location within the United States
- Location: 4 N. Maple St., Ashville, New York
- Coordinates: 42°5′34″N 79°22′30″W
- Built: c. 1835
- Architectural style: Greek Revival
- NRHP reference No.: 74001223
- Added to NRHP: October 1, 1974

The Smith Bly House is a historic house located in Ashville, Chautauqua County, New York.

== Description and history ==
It is a two-story, three-bay-wide, timber-framed, Greek Revival style residence built in about 1835. The recessed entrance features a carved architrave supported by Ionic columns. As described in state records, "The west facades of the main block and wing are finished with flush weatherboards; each facade is divided and framed by elaborately fluted Ionic pilasters. The remainder is clapboarded. The entire structure is painted white. The main entrance is reached by a three-step stair of dressed stone. One brick chimney with rebuilt top is located in the main block."

It was listed on the National Register of Historic Places on October 1, 1974.
