= Sarah Loguen Fraser =

American physician, first female doctor in the Dominican Republic, (1850–1933)

Sarah Marinda Loguen Fraser
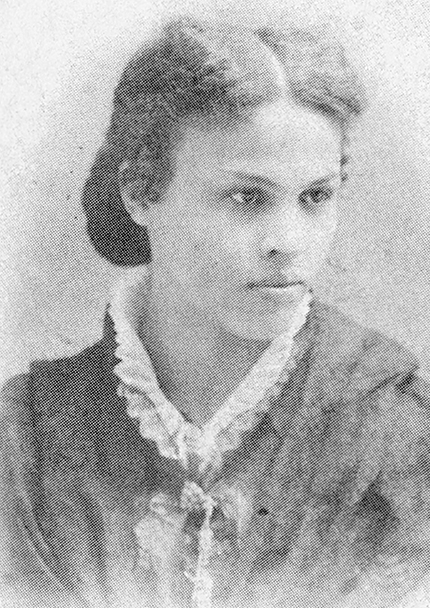
- Fraser, c. 1875
- Born: Sarah Marinda Loguen; January 29, 1850; Syracuse, New York, U.S.
- Died: April 9, 1933 (aged 83); Washington, D.C., U.S.
- Education: Syracuse University School of Medicine (MD)
- Known for: First female physician to practice medicine in the Dominican Republic
- Scientific career
- Fields: Family medicine, obstetrics, and pediatrics

Sarah Marinda Loguen Fraser, née Loguen, (January 29, 1850 – April 9, 1933) was an American physician and pediatrician. She was the fourth female African-American physician in the United States, and the first female doctor in the Dominican Republic.

The daughter of an abolitionist, Fraser grew up in a home that marked a stopping point on the Underground Railroad, where she learned to treat several injuries as a young girl. She began her formal medical education in 1873 at the Syracuse University School of Medicine, now the State University of New York Upstate Medical University. When she graduated in the spring of 1876, she became the fourth African American woman to earn a medical doctorate.

She met her husband, a chemist named Dr. Charles Fraser, through Frederick Douglass in 1877. After marrying him in 1882, they moved to Puerto Plata, Dominican Republic, where Charles owned a pharmacy. Fraser gave birth to her daughter, Gregoria Alejandrina Fraser, in 1883, and complications during childbirth left Fraser unable to conceive again. After her husband died in 1894, Fraser and her daughter moved to Washington, D.C., where she lived off-and-on until her death in 1933.

== Early life ==
Fraser was the daughter of Jermain Wesley Loguen, a noted abolitionist who had escaped slavery, and his wife Caroline. She was born the fifth of eight children at her family home in Syracuse, New York, and was nicknamed "Tinnie." This house became an important stopping point on the Underground Railroad, eventually giving shelter to approximately 1,500 escaped slaves as they traveled to safety in Canada. Growing up in this house allowed Fraser to gain experience in treating the injuries and illnesses these people had suffered as a result of their slavery or escape. Around the time that she graduated high school, Fraser's father became a bishop in the African Methodist Episcopal Zion Church, so she would ride his circuit with him as his secretary and spend her free time studying German. When her father died unexpectedly in September 1872, twenty-two-year-old Fraser became the head of her household.

She decided to become a physician in 1873 shortly after the death of her father, seeing a young boy pinned beneath a wagon and vowing "I will never, never see a human being in need of aid again and not be able to help." She was supported in her career path by her family physician, Michael D. Benedict, whom she studied under and shadowed for five months. Later on, Benedict would be her instructor in some of her medical courses.

Fraser was admitted to Syracuse University School of Medicine, now known as State University of New York Upstate Medical University, at age 23. Her 1873 enrollment in medical school was celebrated by a local Syracuse newspaper which wrote: "This is women's rights in the right direction, and we cordially wish the estimable young lady every success in the pursuit of the profession of her choice."

== Education ==
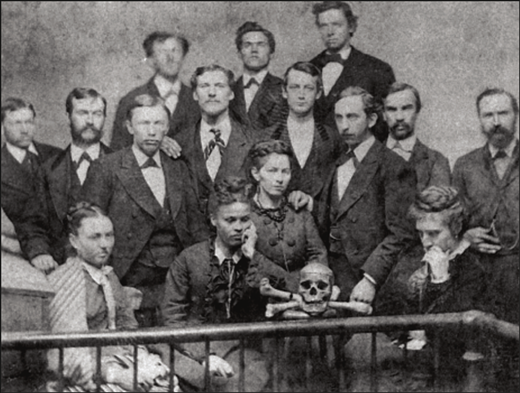
Fraser (front row, center) and the rest of the graduating class of 1876 at Syracuse University School of Medicine.

Before her formal medical education, Fraser studied under her family physician, Dr. Michael Benedict, for five months. With his help, she gained admission at the Syracuse University School of Medicine in the fall of 1873.

In 1876, she became the first woman to gain an M.D. from Syracuse University School of Medicine, now known as State University of New York Upstate Medical University, and is believed to be only the fourth African-American woman to become a licensed physician in the United States, the second in New York, and the first to graduate from a coeducational medical school. In fall of 1876, she began interning in pediatrics and obstetrics at the Woman's Hospital of Philadelphia, then continued on to the New England Hospital for Women and Children to complete her internship in 1878. This second hospital was unique in its use of all-women staffing, and it was here that Fraser gained a passion for obstetrics and midwifery.

While at the Women's Hospital of Philadelphia, Fraser reportedly conducted an experiment where she gave agitated patients soft, pastel-colored yarn to knit with, remembering how soft colors helped calm her when stressed as a medical student. These trials had a remarkable calming effect on the patients, and are thought to be a very early example of usage of the psychology of color in a hospital setting.

== Medical career ==
In 1879, Fraser began her own private practice in Washington D.C., where she lived with her sister Amelia, Amelia's husband Lewis Douglass (son of noted abolitionist Frederick Douglass), and their aunt. It was here that she is reported to have first gained the nickname "Miss Doc," which she would be referred to as for the rest of her career.

In 1884, following a special license by then-president Fernando Arturo de Meriño, Dr. Fraser became the first woman authorized to practice medicine in the Dominican Republic, where she had moved to live with her husband. However, she was only permitted to treat women and children due to her gender. In addition, since her family's income from their drug store was sufficient for the family, she was able to offer free treatment to the poor.

After her husband died in 1894, Sarah ended her practice, so that she could spend her full time running the family pharmacy in Puerto Plata, which was a popular neighborhood spot. She closed the pharmacy in 1896 and used the profits to move herself and Gregoria to Washington D.C.

In 1907, Fraser began practicing pediatric medicine again from her home in Syracuse, New York and mentored black midwives. Her unique position as both a university-educated physician and midwife allowed for her to impact otherwise under-served populations, which had been her interest since entering medicine. Fraser wrote in her private journals that "to have those of my race come to me for aid—and for me to be able to give it—will be all the Heaven I want."

Following financial difficulty in 1908 surrounding an unpaid loan to her brother-in-law Lewis Douglass, she briefly worked as resident physician at the Blue Plains Industrial School for Boys in Maryland, but soon quit due to discrimination and poor treatment. Dr. Fraser also briefly worked at a women's clinic after moving to Washington D.C., but quit due to racism from white women coworkers.

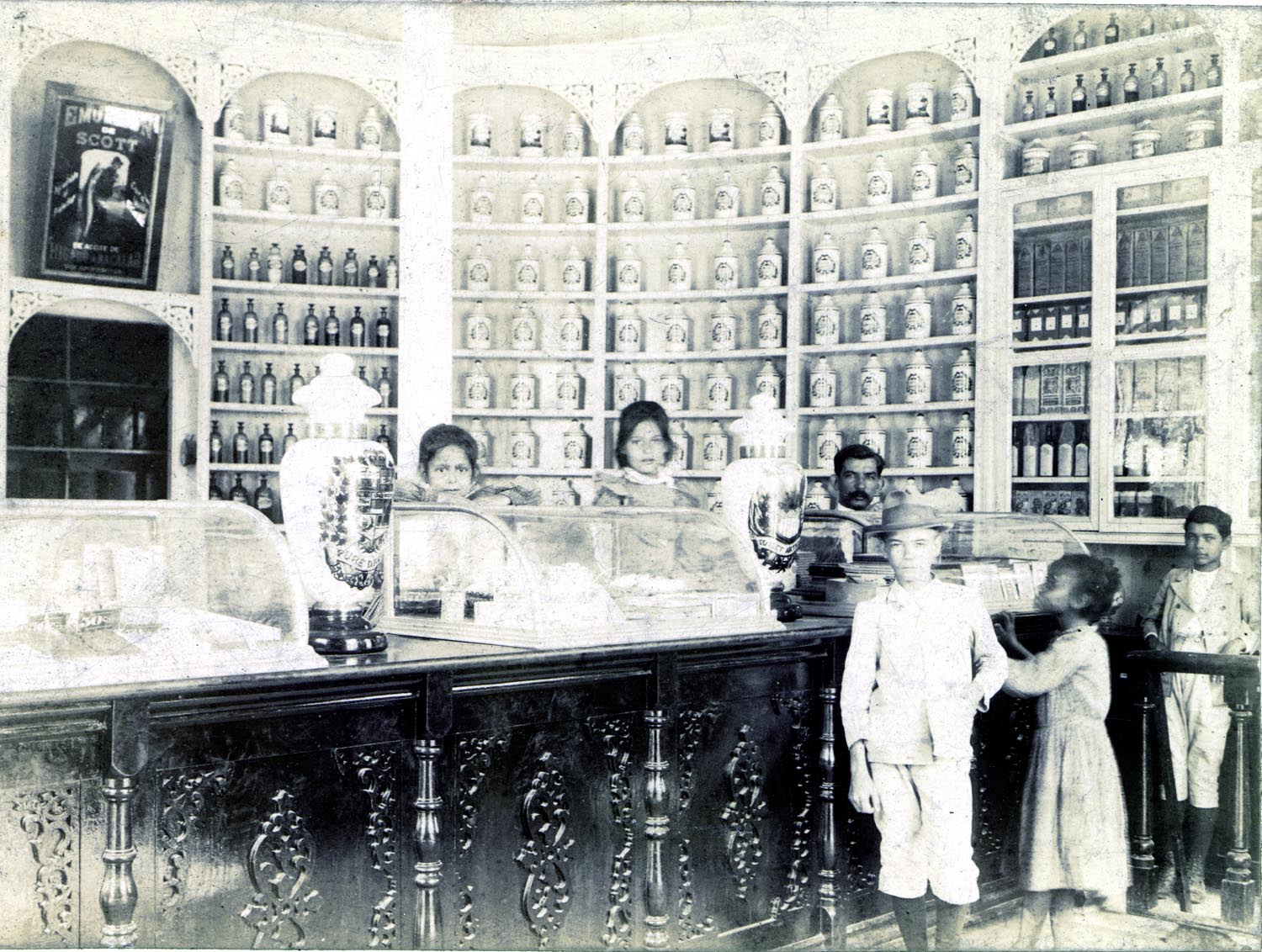
Dr. & Dr. Fraser's pharmacy in Puerto Plata

== Personal life ==
After graduation from medical school, Fraser was proposed to by a white classmate, who claimed to love her but also told her that having a white husband would be essential to her professional success. She declined the offer, but while she was in Washington D.C., began a correspondence with chemist Dr. Charles Fraser. Encouraged in part by family friend Frederick Douglass, who approved of their relationship and had arranged their initial meeting, the two married in 1882. Soon after, they moved to Charles' home in the Puerto Plata in the Dominican Republic.

On December 23, 1883, Fraser gave birth a daughter, Gregoria Alejandrina, named after her godfather Gregorio Luperón. However, only a native midwife attended her birth, with no medical intervention, and Fraser sustained damage to her internal organs during childbirth. This resulted in her being unable to carry any more children.

In 1894, Charles Fraser died due to stroke. With no reason to stay in the Dominican Republic, Dr. Fraser moved back to Washington D.C. in early 1897 and, unsatisfied with the racism in American education systems, enrolled her daughter in boarding school in Neuilly-sur-Seine in France. From then to 1901, Fraser and her daughter travelled frequently between Washington and France.

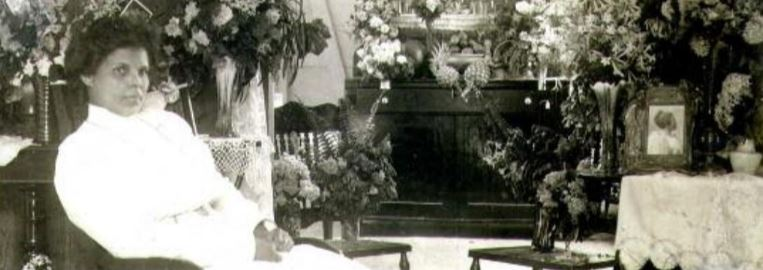
Dr. Fraser at home in Puerto Plata, 1885

In 1901, she settled with her daughter in Washington D.C. She died at home in Washington D.C. on April 9, 1933, due to kidney disease and Alzheimer's disease.

== Legacy ==
When Sarah Fraser died in 1933, the Dominican Republic declared a nine-day period of national mourning with flags flown at half-mast. A small park in Syracuse honors the Loguen family, including a mural of the family, while the Child Care Center at Upstate Medical University is named in Sarah's honor. Each year, Upstate also awards the "Sarah Loguen Fraser Scholarship" to a first or second year medical student who demonstrates need and "holds similar ideals to Dr. Sarah Loguen Fraser." In recent years, Upstate has celebrated "Sarah Loguen Fraser Day" in February, typically with a lecture and luncheon, as a part of Black History Month. Dr. Fraser is buried at Lincoln Memorial Cemetery in Suitland, Maryland.

In 2025, SUNY Upstate Medical University erected a statue of Sarah Loguen Fraser on its campus to celebrate her trailblazing career.
