= Busti Mill =

- U.S. National Register of Historic Places
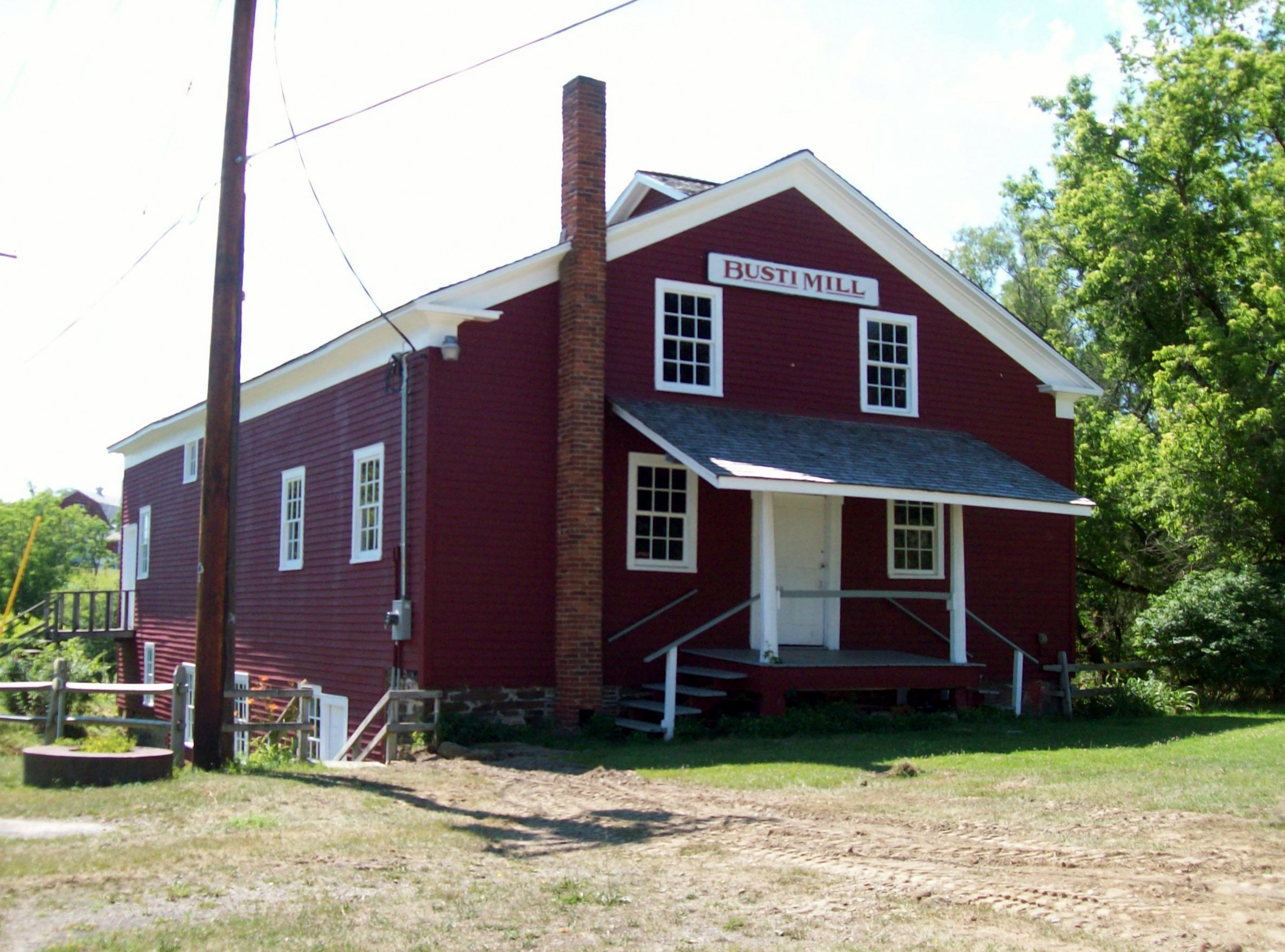
- Busti Mill, July 2012

- Location within New York Location within the United States
- Location: Lawson Rd., Busti, New York
- Coordinates: 42°2′2″N 79°16′52″W
- Built: 1881
- NRHP reference No.: 76001208
- Added to NRHP: July 23, 1976

Busti Mill, also known as the Old Mill, is a historic grist mill located at Busti in Chautauqua County, New York, USA. It was built in 1839 and remained in operation until around 1959 or 1960. In the later years, the mill was rented out and used sporadically, and the exact closing date is undetermined. The town of Busti deeded the mill to the Busti Historical Society on December 29, 1972.

It was listed on the National Register of Historic Places in 1976.

The mill is part of the Busti Grist Mill & Historical Society Museum, and is open for the town's annual apple festival and by appointment.
