= Point Chautauqua Historic District =

Historic district in New York, United States

- U.S. National Register of Historic Places
- U.S. Historic district
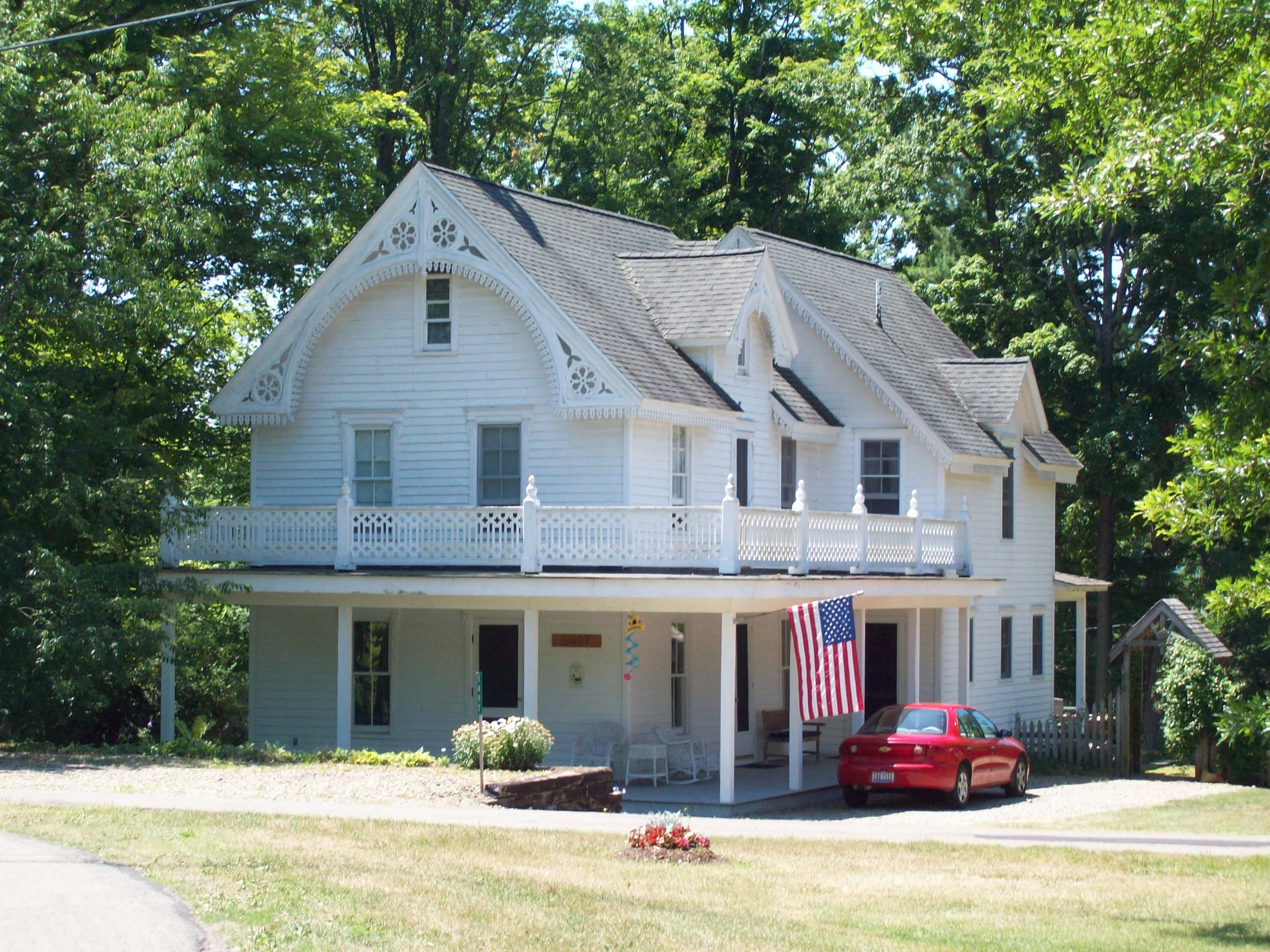
- House in the Point Chautauqua Historic District, Mayville, NY, July 2012

- Location within New York Location within the United States
- Location: Roughly bounded by NY 430 and Chautauqua Lake between Lake and Leet Aves., near Mayville, New York
- Coordinates: 42°14′15″N 79°27′37″W
- Built: 1875
- Architect: Olmsted, Frederick Law
- Architectural style: Bungalow/Craftsman, Queen Anne, Carpenter Gothic
- NRHP reference No.: 96000521
- Added to NRHP: May 17, 1996

Point Chautauqua Historic District is a national historic district located on Point Chautauqua, three miles (5 km) from Mayville in Chautauqua County, New York. It is located approximately due north, upwards and to the left, across Chautauqua Lake from the Chautauqua Institution. The district is a planned resort community laid out in 1875 by Frederick Law Olmsted as a Baptist camp meeting. Within a generation, it had become a resort community. The 80-acre (320,000 m^{2}) district includes the serpentine street system, which ascends the steeply wooded slopes of the site, and its collection of single family residences developed in the late 19th and early 20th century. Among the architectural styles represented are American Craftsman, Queen Anne, and Carpenter Gothic.

Point Chautauqua previously had its own post office, ZIP Code 14768, that closed and merged with the neighboring office in Dewittville on April 30, 1966. The historic district was listed on the National Register of Historic Places in 1996.
