= Busti (CDP), New York =

Busti, New York
- Census-designated place
- Location within New York Location within the United States
- Coordinates: 42°2′17″N 79°17′0″W
- Country: USA
- State: New York
- County: Chautauqua
- Town: Busti

Area
  - Total: 2.26 sq mi (5.86 km^{2})
  - Land: 2.26 sq mi (5.86 km^{2})
  - Water: 0 sq mi (0.00 km^{2})
- Elevation: 1,368 ft (417 m)

Population (2020)
  - Total: 349
  - Density: 154.2/sq mi (59.52/km^{2})
- Time zone: UTC-5 (Eastern (EST))
  - Summer (DST): UTC-4 (EDT)
- ZIP Code: 14701 (Jamestown)
- Area code: 716
- FIPS code: 36-11440
- GNIS feature ID: 0945336

Busti is a hamlet and census-designated place in the town of Busti in Chautauqua County, New York, United States. The population was 391 at the 2010 census, out of a total population in the town of 7,351.

== Geography ==
Busti hamlet is located east of the geographic center of the town of Busti, well south of the main settlements in the town, which are along Chautauqua Lake in the north. The hamlet is centered on a five-way intersection of Busti-Sugar Grove Road (departing southwest), Mill Road (southeast), Busti-Stillwater Road (east), Forest Avenue (northeast), and Southwestern Drive (northwest). The city of Jamestown is 5 miles (8 km) to the northeast up Forest Avenue.

The hamlet sits in a valley on the north side of Stillwater Creek, an east-flowing tributary of Conewango Creek, part of the Allegheny River watershed. According to the United States Census Bureau, the community has a total area of 2.3 square miles (5.9 km^{2}), all land.

== Demographics ==
Historical population
Census	Pop.	Note	%±
2020	349		—
U.S. Decennial Census
