= Albert G. Dow =

American politician

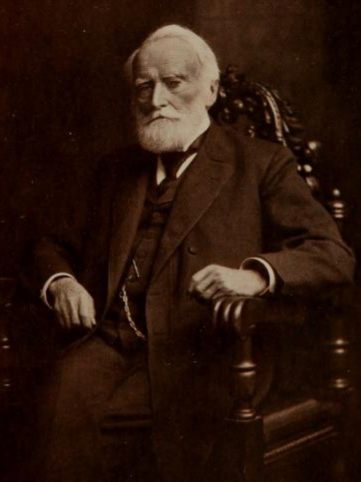

Albert Gallatin Dow (August 16, 1808 Plainfield, then in Cheshire Co., now in Sullivan County, New Hampshire – May 23, 1908) was an American merchant, banker and politician from New York.

== Life ==
He was the son of Solomon Dow (died 1822) and Phebe Dow. The family removed to Hartland, Vermont, in 1811; and to a farm about nine miles from Batavia, New York in 1816. He attended the common schools, and then became a store clerk. In 1827, he removed to Panama, and the next year to Silver Creek where he ran first a shoe and leather shop, then a hardware store. On October 4, 1829, he married Freelove Mason (1806–1847), and they had five children.

In 1845, he removed to Randolph, and ran there a dry-goods store and a hardware store. On April 23, 1850, he married Lydia Ann Mason (1814–1891), a sister of his first wife, and they had a son. From 1860 on, he engaged in banking, and from 1881 to 1890 was President of the First National Bank of Salamanca.

He entered politics as a Democrat, became a War Democrat at the beginning of the American Civil War, and remained a Republican thereafter. He was Supervisor of the Town of Randolph in 1851, 1853, 1856 to 1859, and 1862; a member of the New York State Assembly (Cattaraugus Co., 2nd D.) in 1863 and 1864; and a member of the New York State Senate (32nd D.) in 1874 and 1875.

He died on May 23, 1908, aged 99, and was buried at the Randolph Cemetery.

== Sources ==
- Biographical Sketches of the State Officers and the Members of the Legislature of the State of New York in 1862 and '63 by William D. Murphy (1863)
- Life Sketches of Government Officers and Members of the Legislature of the State of New York in 1875 by W. H. McElroy and Alexander McBride (pg. 57f) [e-book]
- The New York Civil List compiled by Franklin Benjamin Hough, Stephen C. Hutchins and Edgar Albert Werner (1870; pg. 497 and 499)
- Albert Gallatin Dow (1808–1908) (e-book)

New York State Assembly
Preceded by Addison G. Rice	New York State Assembly; Cattaraugus County, 2nd District; 1863–1864	Succeeded by E. Curtis Topliff
New York State Senate
Preceded by Norman M. Allen	New York State Senate; 32nd District; 1874–1875	Succeeded by Commodore P. Vedder
