= Busti, New York =

- Town
- Motto: "Progress Since 1823"
- Location within Chautauqua County and New York

- Location within New York Location within the United States
- Coordinates: 42°4′N 79°18′W
- Country: United States
- State: New York
- County: Chautauqua

Government
  - Type: Town council
  - Town supervisor: Jesse Robbins (R)
  - Town council: Members' list: • Todd M. Hanson (R); • Kenneth J. Lawton (R); • Brett Mucheck (); • Richard B. Thor (R)

Area
  - Total: 47.84 sq mi (123.90 km^{2})
  - Land: 47.83 sq mi (123.87 km^{2})
  - Water: 0.015 sq mi (0.04 km^{2})
- Elevation: 1,463 ft (446 m)

Population (2020)
  - Total: 7,521
  - Estimate (2021): 7,469
  - Density: 153.2/sq mi (59.16/km^{2})
- Time zone: UTC-5 (Eastern (EST))
  - Summer (DST): UTC-4 (EDT)
- ZIP Codes: 14701 (Jamestown); 14750 (Lakewood); 14710 (Ashville)
- FIPS code: 36-013-11451
- GNIS feature ID: 0978768
- Website: www.townofbustiny.gov

Busti (/ˈbʌstaɪ/ BUST-eye) is a town in Chautauqua County, New York, United States. The population was 7,521 at the 2020 census. The town is named after Paul Busti, an official of the Holland Land Company, but its pronunciation uses a long i sound at the end, a frequent alteration in the names of several upstate New York towns. It has frequently been noted on lists of unusual place names.

The town of Busti is located at the south end of Chautauqua Lake, southwest of Jamestown.

== History ==
Settlement began circa 1811. The town of Busti was founded in 1823 from parts of the towns of Harmony and Ellicott. In 1900, the population was 2,192.

The Busti Mill was listed on the National Register of Historic Places in 1976. The Dr. John Lord House was listed in 1991.

== Notable people ==
- Lorin Blodget, born in Busti in 1823, physicist, statistician and author of Climatology of the United States (1857).
- Lewis Clarke, ex-slave and writer
- Enoch A. Curtis, Fredonia architect
- Caroline Storum Loguen, born in Busti in 1817, abolitionist and wife of Jermain Loguen
- Ralph Plumb, former US congressman from Illinois
- George Stoneman, born in Busti in 1822, graduated from West Point and was a major general of cavalry in the Civil War. He later became governor of California.

== Geography ==
According to the United States Census Bureau, the town has a total area of 47.8 square miles (123.9 km^{2}), of which 0.015 square miles (0.04 km^{2}), or 0.03%, is water.

The south town line is the border of Warren County, Pennsylvania.

New York State Route 474 intersects New York State Route 394 in the northwest corner of the town near Cottage Park.

The lakefront of northern Busti comprises a continuous line of hamlets, originally begun as vacation homes.

== Demographics ==
Historical population
Census	Pop.	Note	%±
1830	1,680		—
1840	1,894		12.7%
1850	1,990		5.1%
1860	2,011		1.1%
1870	1,844		−8.3%
1880	1,901		3.1%
1890	2,089		9.9%
1900	2,192		4.9%
1910	2,136		−2.6%
1920	1,995		−6.6%
1930	3,508		75.8%
1940	4,336		23.6%
1950	5,806		33.9%
1960	7,766		33.8%
1970	8,367		7.7%
1980	8,728		4.3%
1990	8,050		−7.8%
2000	7,760		−3.6%
2010	7,351		−5.3%
2020	7,521		2.3%
2021 (est.)	7,469	▼	−0.7%
U.S. Decennial Census

As of the census of 2000, there were 7,760 people, 3,210 households, and 2,240 families residing in the town. The population density was 162.4 inhabitants per square mile (62.7/km^{2}). There were 3,876 housing units at an average density of 81.1 per square mile (31.3/km^{2}). The racial makeup of the town was 97.96% White, 0.52% African American, 0.08% Native American, 0.44% Asian, 0.44% from other races, and 0.57% from two or more races. Hispanic or Latino of any race were 0.71% of the population.

There were 3,210 households, out of which 29.9% had children under the age of 18 living with them, 58.4% were married couples living together, 7.9% had a female householder with no husband present, and 30.2% were non-families. 26.2% of all households were made up of individuals, and 12.3% had someone living alone who was 65 years of age or older. The average household size was 2.42 and the average family size was 2.92.

In the town, the population was spread out, with 24.1% under the age of 18, 6.0% from 18 to 24, 25.0% from 25 to 44, 28.0% from 45 to 64, and 16.9% who were 65 years of age or older. The median age was 42 years. For every 100 females, there were 96.8 males. For every 100 females age 18 and over, there were 92.3 males.

The median income for a household in the town was $41,450, and the median income for a family was $47,798. Males had a median income of $38,750 versus $26,148 for females. The per capita income for the town was $22,602. About 4.5% of families and 6.2% of the population were below the poverty line, including 8.4% of those under age 18 and 4.9% of those age 65 or over.

== Communities and locations ==
- Ashville – A hamlet near the northwest part of the town on Route 474.
- Ashville Bay – A lakeside hamlet on the shore of Chautauqua Lake.
- Boomertown – A hamlet south of Ashville, located on County Road 30.
- Busti – The hamlet of Busti at the junction of County Roads 28 and 45 near the center of the town.
- Cottage Park – A hamlet near the shore of Chautauqua Lake in the northwest part of the town.
- Lakewood – The village of Lakewood and the location of the town government is on the shore of Chautauqua Lake.
- Loomises – A lakeside hamlet on Chautauqua Lake.
- Maple Point – A lakeside hamlet on the shore of Chautauqua Lake.
- Shermans Bay – A hamlet on the shore of Chautauqua Lake and Route 394.
- Vukote – A lakeside hamlet on the shore of Chautauqua Lake.
- Stateline Speedway – A historic 1/3-mile-long dirt track, located on Kortwright Road
