= Allen D. Scott =

American politician

Allen D. Scott (January 15, 1831 in Springville, Erie County, New York – March 7, 1897 in Buffalo, Erie County, New York) was an American lawyer and politician from New York.

== Life ==
The family removed to a farm in Otto, in Cattaraugus County, when Allen was still an infant. He attended the district schools and Springville Academy. Then he studied law with Chester Howe and Nelson Cobb, was admitted to the bar in 1857, and commenced practice in Ellicottville.

He was Surrogate of Cattaraugus County from 1857 to 1865; a member of the New York State Senate (32nd D.) in 1870 and 1871; and Judge of the Cattaraugus County Court from 1876 to 1887.

In 1892, he removed to Buffalo, and practiced law there.

== Sources ==
- The New York Civil List compiled by Franklin Benjamin Hough, Stephen C. Hutchins and Edgar Albert Werner (1867; pg. 430)
- The New York Civil List compiled by Franklin Benjamin Hough, Stephen C. Hutchins and Edgar Albert Werner (1870; pg. 444)
- Life Sketches of Executive Officers, and Members of the Legislature of the State of New York, Vol. III by H. H. Boone & Theodore P. Cook (1870; pg. 126f)
- Bio transcribed from Our County and Its People: A Descriptive Work on Erie County, New York by Truman C. White (1898)

New York State Senate
Preceded by Lorenzo Morris	New York State Senate; 32nd District; 1870–1871	Succeeded by Norman M. Allen
