= Mary Louise Nash =

American educator, writer(1826–1896)

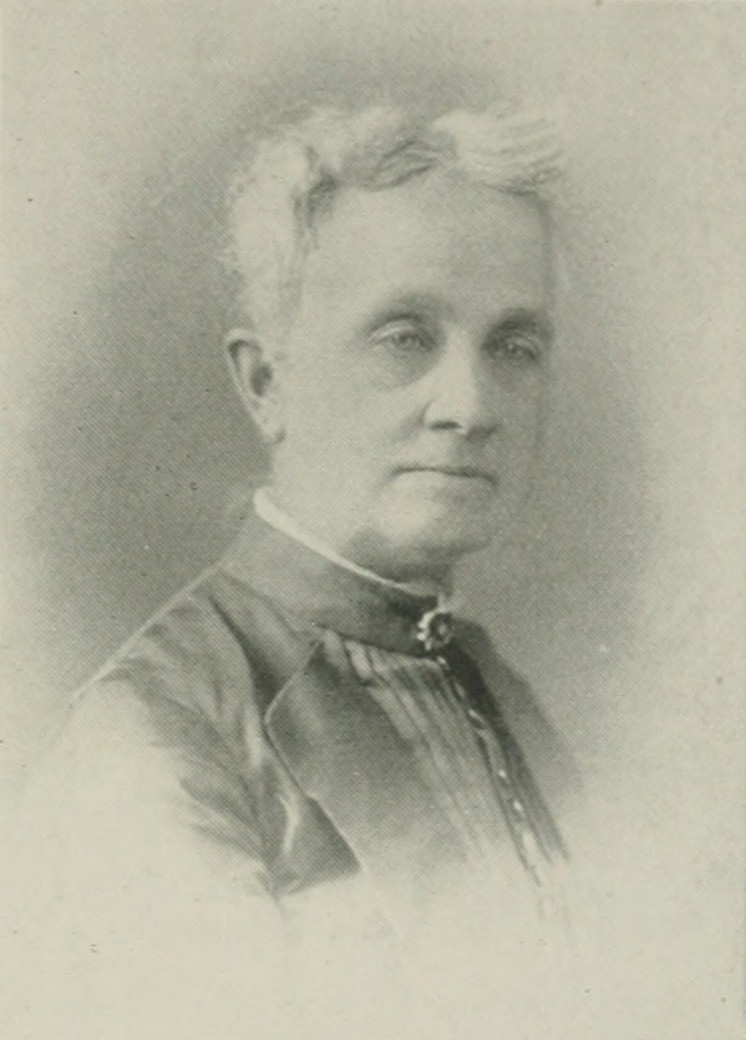
- Portrait photo from A Woman of the Century
- Born: Mary Louise Marsh; July 16, 1826; Panama, New York, U.S.
- Died: February 7, 1896 (aged 69)
- Education: Chautauqua Literary and Scientific Circle
- Occupations: educator; writer
- Organization: Sherman Institute
- Spouse: Jesse Gent Nash (m. 1849)
- Children: 3
- Relatives: Mary Brigham; Eli Whitney; Charlotte Cushman

Mary Louise Nash (1826–1896) was a 19th-century American educator and writer born in New York. She was descended from New England families with Puritan and Revolutionary War ancestry. Over the course of her career, she held administrative positions at several southern colleges, including Mary Sharp College in Tennessee and the University of Waco in Texas. After the Civil War, she and her husband founded the Sherman Institute in Sherman, Texas, a girls’ school that later became Mary Nash College, where she served as principal. Alongside her work in education, Nash wrote serials, sketches, humorous pieces, and dramatic works that appeared in newspapers and periodicals, and she published a school monthly. She was active in literary and scientific pursuits, conducting literary societies and clubs, and was a member of the Daughters of the American Revolution (DAR).

== Early life and education ==
Mary Louise Marsh was born in Panama, New York, July 16, 1826. Her parents were Moses Cushman Marsh and Betsey (nee, Forbush). Mr. Marsh had been a wealthy Cuban trader. He located at the lower village of Panama, built the first frame house in the vicinity, opened the first store of the place, to which he gave the name of Panama, and was made postmaster, March 22, 1826. Mrs. Marsh's maiden name was Forbush. On the Forbush side, the family were Scotch, having left their native country soon after the battle of Culloden. Mrs. Nash was the great-granddaughter of David Forbush, Massachusetts, a Private in Captain Aaron Trumbull's Company, Colonel Artemua Ward's Regiment, Massachusetts Militia, "Lexington Alarm.

She was of Puritan ancestry, with many historical family members notable in early New England history, some being notable at Lexington and Bunker Hill. Mary Brigham, founder of Mount Holyoke College; Eli Whitney, inventor of the cotton gin; and Charlotte Cushman, were found on the branches of the same genealogical tree.

Nash loved books and literary pursuits from an early age, indicating a talent for literary work. She received a thorough education. She was a graduate of the Chautauqua Literary and Scientific Circle, class of 1890. She studied Spanish and was reading Spanish history and literature at the age of 65.

== Career ==
For a number of years she filled the position of lady principal in various southern colleges, including Mary Sharp College, in Winchester, Tennessee, and the University of Waco (later named Baylor University) in Waco, Texas. At the close of the Civil War, requiring a change of climate, she came to Sherman, Texas with her husband and established the Sherman Institute, a chartered school for girls, where she presided as principal. They commenced with twelve pupils, and by 1881, had about two hundred, and a corps of assistants. The school was later renamed Mary Nash College, and was also known as Mary Nash College and Conservatory of Music. After Mrs. Nash's death, her son, A. Q. Nash directed its operations until its closure in 1901 when it was sold to Kidd-Key College.

Amid all the duties of her profession as an educator, she kept up her love of literary pursuits. She was a notable dramatist, as well as the author of serials, descriptive sketches, and humorous pieces, which appeared in various newspapers and periodicals. For some time, she published a school monthly. She developed a reputation as a scientist, especially in the departments of botany and geology.

She conducted a flourishing literary society, an Agassiz chapter, a Shakespearean club, and supervised a YWCA. Nash was a member of the DAR.

== Personal life ==
On July 1, 1849, in Marietta, Ohio, she married Jesse Gent Nash (b. 1822), a southerner, who was ordained by the Baptist church as a minister in 1855.

The couple had three children. William Q. (1852-1854), Jessie Forbush (1862-1863), and Alexander Q. (b. 1855) who became a civil engineer of the city of Sherman.

Mary Marsh Nash died February 7, 1896.
