= Walter L. Sessions =

American politician

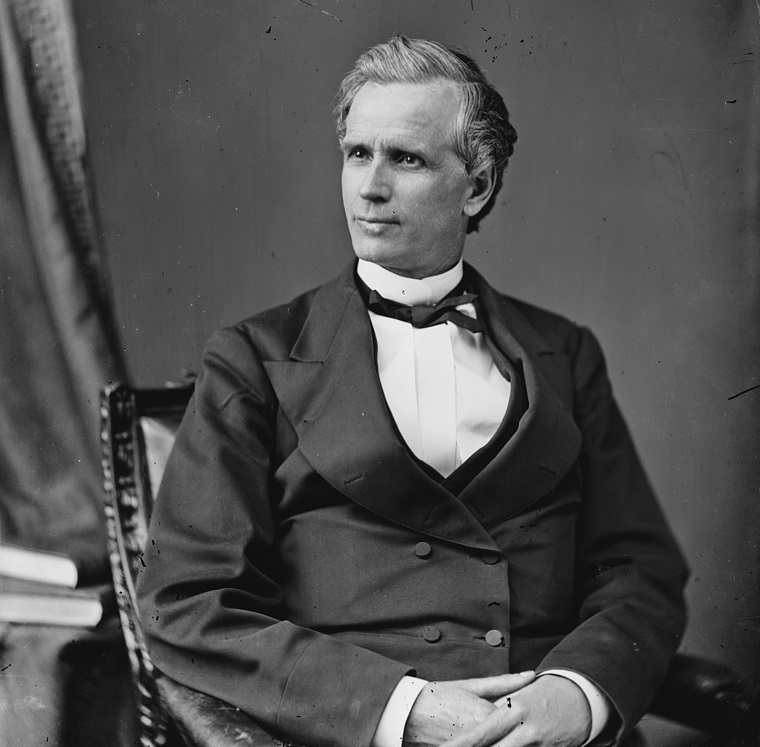
Walter L. Sessions, Congressman from New York

Walter Loomis Sessions (October 4, 1820 in Brandon, Rutland County, Vermont – May 27, 1896 in Panama, Chautauqua County, New York) was an American lawyer and politician from New York.

== Life ==
The family removed to Chautauqua County. He attended the common schools and Westfield Academy. Then he studied law, was admitted to the bar in 1849, and commenced practice in Panama.

He was a member of the New York State Assembly in 1853 and 1854; and was one of the Managers at the Impeachment trial of Canal Commissioner John C. Mather in 1853.

Sessions was a member of the New York State Senate (32nd D.) in 1860, 1861; Supervisor of the Town of Harmony in 1863 and 1864; and again a member of the State Senate in 1866 and 1867.

Sessions was elected as a Republican to the 42nd and 43rd United States Congresses, holding office from March 4, 1871, to March 3, 1875. Afterwards he resumed the practice of law.

Sessions was elected to the 49th United States Congress, holding office from March 4, 1885, to March 3, 1887. Afterwards he resumed the practice of law in Jamestown and Panama. He was appointed Commissioner of the State of New York to the World's Columbian Exposition at Chicago, Illinois, in 1893.

He was buried at the Forest Hill Cemetery.

State Senator Loren B. Sessions (1827–1897) was his brother.

== Sources ==
- United States Congress. "Walter L. Sessions (id: S000251)". Biographical Directory of the United States Congress.
- History of Harmony, NY Deprecated link archived 2013-08-13 at archive.today transcribed from History of Chautauqua County, New York and Its People by John P. Downs & Fenwick Y. Hedley (1921), at Ray's Place

New York State Assembly
Preceded by Austin Smith	New York State Assembly; Chautauqua County, 1st District; 1853–1854	Succeeded by Samuel S. Whallon
New York State Senate
Preceded by John P. Darling	New York State Senate; 32nd District; 1860–1861	Succeeded by Horace C. Young
Preceded by Norman M. Allen	New York State Senate; 32nd District; 1866–1867	Succeeded by Lorenzo Morris
U.S. House of Representatives
Preceded by Porter Sheldon	Member of the U.S. House of Representatives from New York's 31st congressional district 1871–1873	Succeeded by Lyman K. Bass
Preceded by Elbridge G. Spaulding	Member of the U.S. House of Representatives from New York's 32nd congressional district 1873–1875	Succeeded by Lyman K. Bass
Preceded by Lorenzo Burrows	Member of the U.S. House of Representatives from New York's 34th congressional district 1885–1887	Succeeded by William G. Laidlaw
