= Chautauqua Belle =

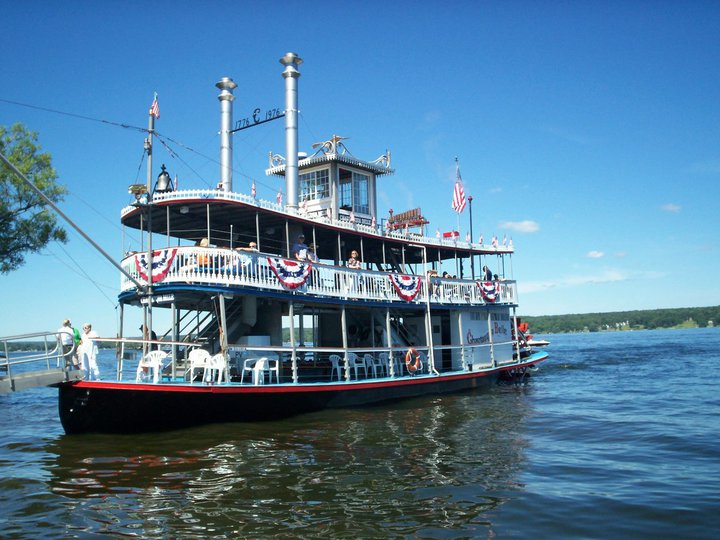
- Chautauqua Belle at the Chautauqua Institution

History
- Name: Chautauqua Belle
- Owner: U.S. Steam Lines LTD
- Builder: James Webster
- Laid down: 1974
- Maiden voyage: July 4, 1976
- Status: Active

General characteristics
- Displacement: 60 Tons
- Length: 98 ft (30 m)
- Beam: 22 ft (6.7 m)
- Draft: 30 in (76 cm)
- Decks: 2
- Installed power: Johnston Boiler
- Propulsion: Sternwheel
- Speed: 7 mph (11 km/h)
- Capacity: 120
- Crew: 7

The steamer Chautauqua Belle is an authentic Mississippi River-style sternwheel steamboat owned and operated by U.S. Steam Lines Ltd, operating on Chautauqua Lake in Western New York.

== History ==
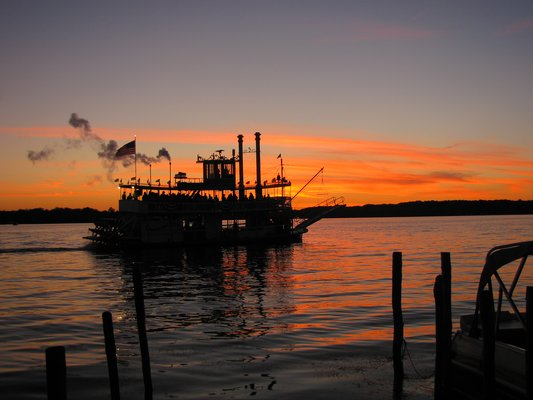
Chautauqua Belle steaming on Chautauqua Lake, Summer 2010

Originally financed and built by Captain James Webster, the vessel was constructed on site in Mayville, New York, between 1974 and 1976. The Chautauqua Belle was launched in 1976 as part of Chautauqua County's celebration of the United States Bicentennial.

The Chautauqua Belle is one of only five operating authentic passenger sternwheel steamboats left in all of North America. The other four vessels are the Virginia V, in Seattle, Washington; Minne-Ha-Ha at Lake George, New York, operating on Lake George; the Belle of Louisville in Louisville, Kentucky, operating on the Ohio River; and the Natchez in New Orleans, Louisiana, operating on the Mississippi River.

The Chautauqua Belle and the Natchez were designed by the naval architect Captain Alan Bates of Louisville, Kentucky.

== Specifications ==
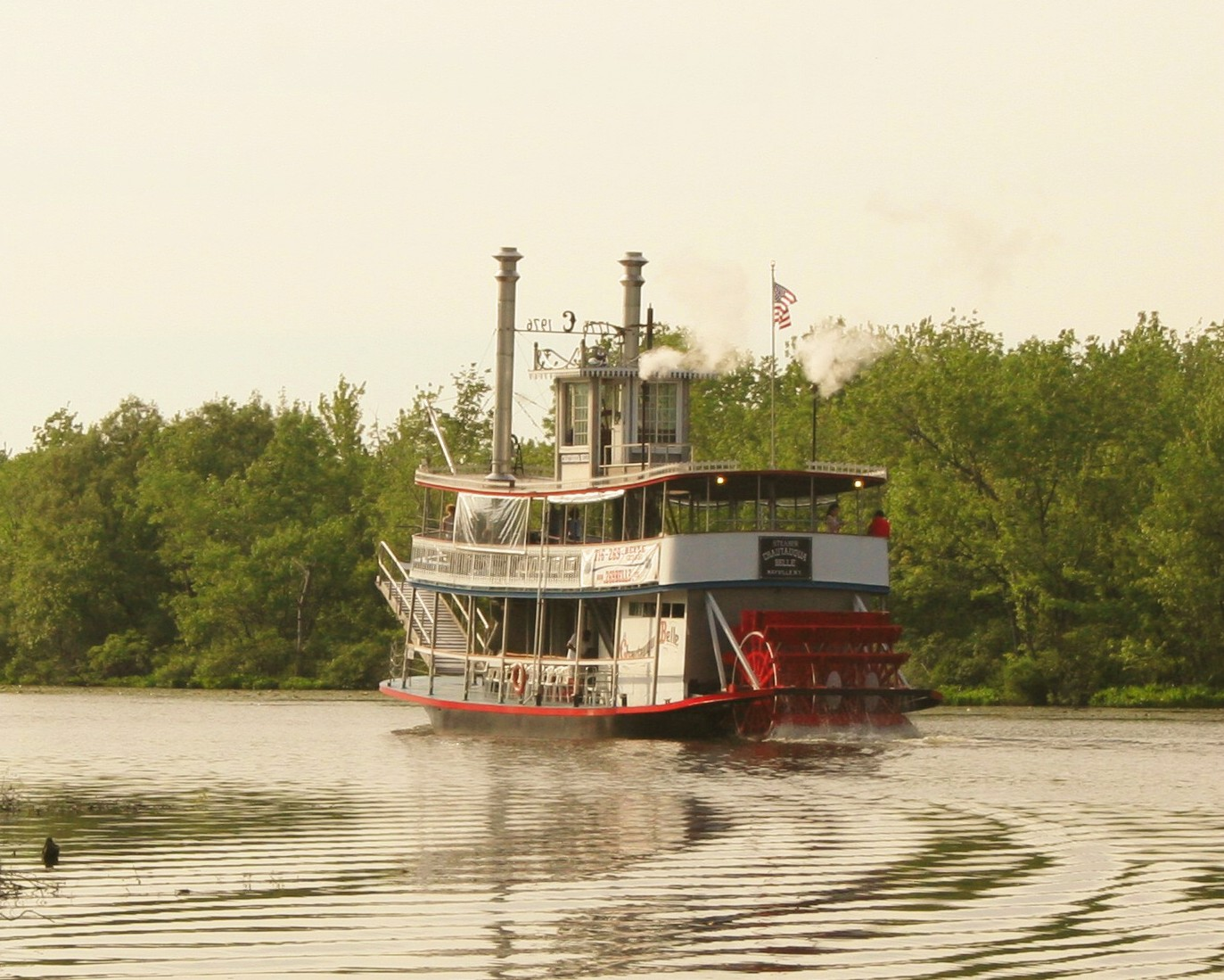
Chautauqua Belle steaming down the Chadakoin River, June 2008

The Chautauqua Belle is 98 feet (30 m) long and 22 feet (6.7 m) wide, and weighs 70 tons fully loaded. She has a 100-horsepower Scotch steam boiler aboard which supplies steam at 210 pounds per square inch (1,400 kPa) to the two 20 horsepower steam engines which turn her paddlewheel. She has a 60-horsepower Uniflow marine steam engine manufactured by Skinner Engine Company which is attached via a belt drive to a 30 kilowatt generator to provide her electricity needs. Her top speed is 7 miles per hour (11 km/h). The engines were built for the Chautauqua Belle by Harry McBride in 1975. She has a mechanical steering system with cable operation of two rudders mounted on the stern ahead of her paddlewheel.

Her design features many of the architectural details lost to the modern boat builder, like cambered decks to shed water from her roof and a sheer line to evenly distribute the weight of the boilers, engines and paddlewheel. Features such as her gingerbread trim and wedding cake stacked superstructure are indigenous to the Mississippi River-styled steamboat. This style of deck layout, which became the pinnacle of all steamboat architecture, was pioneered by Henry Shreve and his steamboat Washington of 1824. The vessel featured a barge-like hull which allowed the steamboat to carry immense weight while maintaining a shallow draft for navigation on the shallow inland rivers.
