= Caroline Storum Loguen =

American abolitionist (1817–1867)

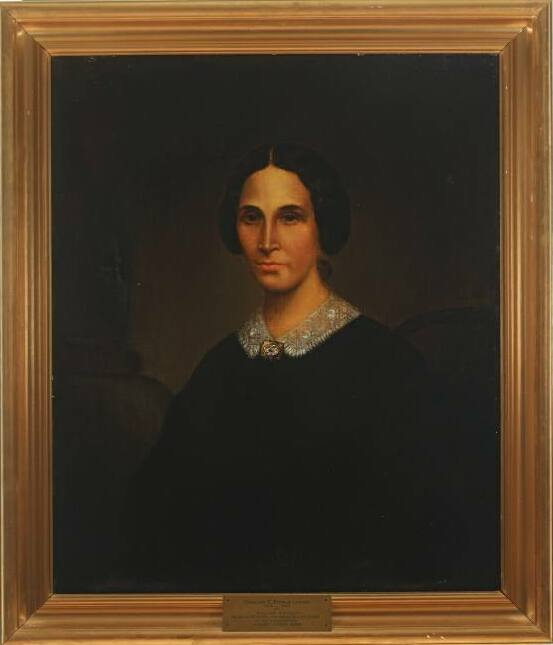
- 1854 portrait of Loguen by William R. Simpson
- Born: 1817; Busti, New York, U.S.
- Died: August 17, 1867 (aged 49–50); Syracuse, New York, U.S.
- Resting place: Oakwood Cemetery
- Spouse: Jermain Wesley Loguen
- Children: 6, including Sarah Loguen Fraser

Caroline Storum Loguen (1817 – August 17, 1867) was an American abolitionist who helped to run a major depot on the Underground Railroad. Loguen helped an estimated 1,500 formerly enslaved persons reach freedom.

== Early life and education ==
Caroline Storum was born in 1817 to William H. Storum and Sarah Gomar. She was biracial, from a free and educated abolitionist family.

== Activism ==
Beginning in the 1850s, Loguen and her husband Jermain Wesley Loguen ran a major depot (stop) on the Underground Railroad out of the cellar of their Syracuse home on 293 East Genesee Street. They published an invitation to escaped enslaved persons, with their address, in the local newspaper. Loguen and her husband would provide visiting individuals with meals, a bath, and a sense of security. If any of the slaves decided to settle in the area, they would help them find employment. Loguen and her husband were referred to by some in New York as the “‘King and Queen" of the Underground Railroad.

== Personal life ==
In 1840, she was married to Jermain Wesley Loguen, abolitionist and bishop of the African Methodist Episcopal Zion Church. They had at least six children. Their daughter Amelia married Lewis Henry Douglass, a son of Frederick Douglass, in 1869. Another daughter, Sarah Loguen Fraser, became one of the first African-American women to become a licensed medical practitioner, and later became the first female doctor in the Dominican Republic.

== Death ==
Loguen died of tuberculosis in 1867 in Syracuse, New York. She is interred at Oakwood Cemetery in Syracuse.

=== Legacy ===
After her death, Reverend Samuel Joseph May wrote, "could the labors of those who conducted [America's] Underground Railroad be adequately described, the name of Mrs. Loguen [would] stand conspicuously among the friends of the oppressed." A New York Preservation Society historical marker regarding Loguen and her husband was erected at the former site of their Syracuse home.

Loguen's portrait is on display at the Howard University Gallery of Art.
