= Commodore P. Vedder =

American politician

Commodore Perry Vedder
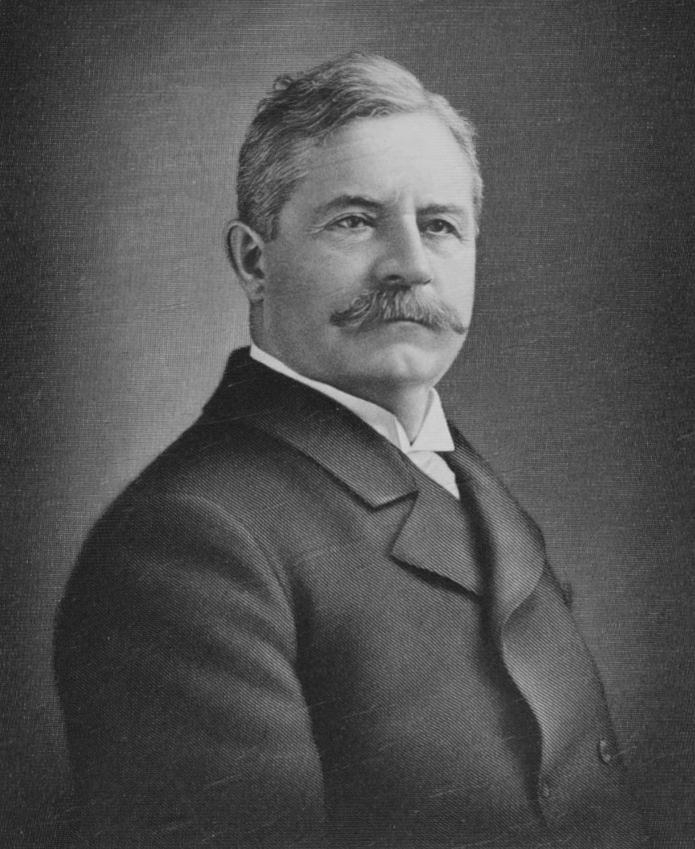

Member of the New York State Senate
- In office 1876–1877, 1884–1891
- Constituency: 32nd District

Member of the New York State Assembly
- In office 1872–1875
- Constituency: 1st District

Personal details
- Born: February 23, 1838 Ellicottville, New York
- Died: December 24, 1910 (aged 72) Manhattan, New York
- Party: Republican
- Spouses: Betty E. Squires (m. 1862; died 1884) Genevieve Wheeler (m. 1892)
- Occupation: Lawyer, politician

Commodore Perry Vedder (February 23, 1838 – December 24, 1910) was an American lawyer and politician from New York.

== Life ==
Commodore Perry Vedder was born in Ellicottville, New York on February 23, 1838, the son of Jacob Vedder. He attended the common schools, and then spent five years as a sailor on the Great Lakes. In 1858, he entered Springville Academy, and afterwards began to study law.

During the American Civil War he enlisted as a private in the 154th New York Volunteers, fought in the battles of Chancellorsville, Wauhatchie, Lookout Mountain, Bentonville and others; and finished the war as a lieutenant colonel of Volunteers.

After the war, he finished his law studies, was admitted to the bar in 1866, and practiced in Ellicottville. He was Assessor of Internal Revenue from 1869 to 1871.

He was a member of the New York State Assembly (Cattaraugus Co., 1st D.) in 1872, 1873, 1874 and 1875.

He was a member of the New York State Senate (32nd D.) in 1876 and 1877. He was State Assessor from 1880 to 1883.

He was again a member of the State Senate from 1884 to 1891, sitting in the 107th, 108th, 109th, 110th, 111th, 112th, 113th and 114th New York State Legislatures. He ran once more in 1891, but was defeated by James T. Edwards.

He married Betty E. Squires in 1862, and they had one son. She died in 1884, and he remarried to Genevieve Wheeler in Chicago on July 12, 1892. The couple went to live in New York City. He was a delegate to the New York State Constitutional Convention of 1894.

He died of heart disease at the Majestic Hotel in New York City on December 24, 1910, and was buried at the Sunset Hill Cemetery in Ellicottville.

New York State Assembly
Preceded by Claudius V. B. Barse	New York State Assembly; Cattaraugus County, 1st District; 1872–1875	Succeeded by Harrison Cheney
New York State Senate
Preceded by Albert G. Dow	New York State Senate; 32nd District; 1876–1877	Succeeded by Loren B. Sessions
Preceded by Norman M. Allen	New York State Senate; 32nd District; 1884–1891	Succeeded by James T. Edwards
