= Henry Cousins =

19th century American politician

Henry Cousins (February 7, 1827 – October 25, 1888) was an American lawyer and politician.

Cousins was born in Mayville, New York, where he received his education. He moved to Elyria, Ohio, and studied law. In 1848, Cousins was admitted to the Ohio bar. In 1850, Cousins moved to East Troy, Wisconsin, and continued to practice law. He moved to Eau Claire, Wisconsin, in 1866. In 1867, Cousins, a Republican, was elected district attorney for Eau Claire County, Wisconsin. Cousins served in the Wisconsin Assembly in 1871 and as a delegate to the Wisconsin Republican convention in 1873. He died at his home in Eau Claire, Wisconsin.
