= Norman M. Allen =

American politician

Norman Milton Allen (December 24, 1828 – November 15, 1909) was an American politician from New York.

== Early life and career ==
He was the son of Luther Allen and Huldah (Benedict) Allen. He was born in that part of the Town of Perrysburg which was separated in 1835 as the Town of Dayton, in Cattaraugus County, New York. He attended the common schools, and worked on a farm. Then he taught school and privately studied law. In 1848, he married Huldah Merrill (died 1913), and they had several children. He was admitted to the bar in 1854, and practiced in Dayton.

== Political involvement ==
He entered politics as a Democrat, and joined the Republican Party upon its foundation in 1855. He was Supervisor of the Town of Dayton for 36 years, and chairman of the Board of Supervisors of Cattaraugus County for 29 years.

He was a member of the New York State Senate (32nd D.) in 1864 and 1865; a delegate to the New York State Constitutional Convention of 1867–68; and again a member of the State Senate (32nd D.) in 1872 and 1873. In 1872, he joined the Liberal Republican Party and supported Horace Greeley for president.

He was again a member of the State Senate in 1882 and 1883.

== Sources ==
- The New York Civil List compiled by Franklin Benjamin Hough, Stephen C. Hutchins and Edgar Albert Werner (1870; pg. 443)
- Life Sketches of Executive Officers and Members of the Legislature of the State of New York by William H. McElroy & Alexander McBride (1873; pg. 51f) [e-book]
- Norman M. Allen Dead in NYT on November 15, 1909

New York State Senate
| Preceded by Horace C. Young | New York State Senate; 32nd District; 1864–1865 | Succeeded by Walter L. Sessions |
| Preceded by Allen D. Scott | New York State Senate; 32nd District; 1872–1873 | Succeeded by Albert G. Dow |
| Preceded by Loren B. Sessions | New York State Senate; 32nd District; 1882–1883 | Succeeded by Commodore P. Vedder |
