= Horace C. Young =

American politician

Horace Corydon Young
- Born: August 28, 1806; Smithfield, New York
- Died: May 19, 1879 (aged 72)
- Occupations: Politician and architect
- Spouse: Laura P. Walker (m. 1831)
- Children: 6, including H. Olin Young

Horace Corydon Young (August 28, 1806 – May 19, 1879) was an American architect and politician from New York.

== Life ==
He was the son of Henry Young (1775–1852) and Philany (Kellogg) Young (1783-1865). He was born in that part of the Town of Smithfield which was separated in 1823 as the Town of Fenner, in Madison County, New York. He became a builder and architect. On January 19, 1831, he married Laura P. Walker (1808–1890), and they had six children, among them Congressman H. Olin Young (1850–1917).

In May 1832, the couple removed to New Albion, in Cattaraugus County. He was elected a Justice of the Peace in 1834; and was Supervisor of New Albion in 1843, and from 1845 to 1848. He drew the plans for the first Minnesota State Capitol which burned down in 1881.

He was a member of the New York State Assembly (Cattaraugus Co., 2nd D.) in 1849 and 1850; and of the New York State Senate (32nd D.) in 1862 and 1863.

== Sources ==
- The New York Civil List compiled by Franklin Benjamin Hough, Stephen C. Hutchins and Edgar Albert Werner (1870; pg. 443, 466 and 468)
- Biographical Sketches of the State Officers and the Members of the Legislature of the State of New York in 1862 and '63 by William D. Murphy (1863; pg. 120ff)
- History of New Albion transcribed from Historical Gazetteer and Biographical Memorial of Cattaraugus Co. NY by William Adams (1893), at Painted Hills

New York State Assembly
Preceded by Marcus H. Johnson	New York State Assembly; Cattaraugus County, 2nd District; 1849–1850	Succeeded by William J. Nelson
New York State Senate
Preceded by Walter L. Sessions	New York State Senate; 32nd District; 1862–1863	Succeeded by Norman M. Allen
