= Dr. John Lord House =

Historic house in New York, United States

- U.S. National Register of Historic Places
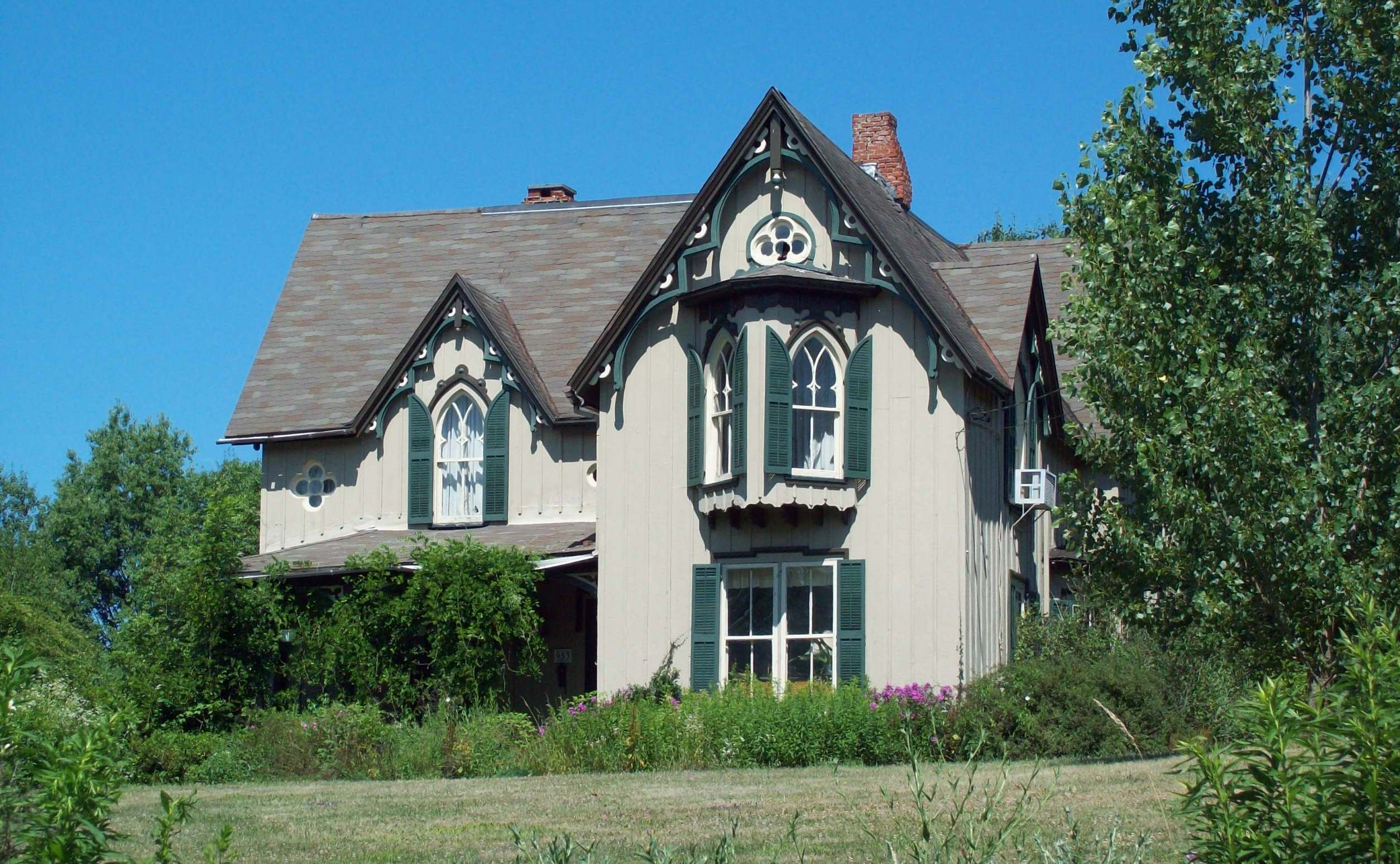
- Dr. John Lord House, July 2012

- Location within New York Location within the United States
- Location: Forest Rd. Extension, Busti, New York
- Coordinates: 42°2′34″N 79°16′50″W
- Built: 1867
- Architectural style: Gothic Revival
- NRHP reference No.: 91000104
- Added to NRHP: March 2, 1991

Dr. John Lord House is a historic home located at Busti in Chautauqua County, New York. It is a two-and-a-half-story wood-frame Gothic Revival–style residence built in 1867.

It was restored by R.A. Martin and Janette Gould Martin.

It was listed on the National Register of Historic Places in 1991.
