= James T. Edwards =

American politician

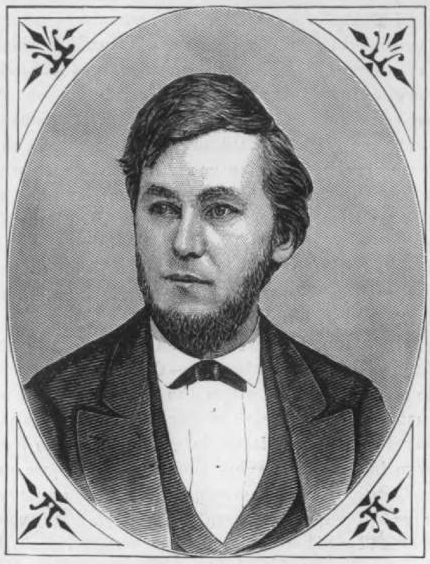
- Born: James Thomas Edwards; January 6, 1838; Barnegat Light, New Jersey, U.S.
- Died: August 20, 1914 (aged 76); Randolph, New York, U.S.
- Education: Pennington Seminary; Wesleyan University
- Occupations: Educator, clergyman, politician

James Thomas Edwards (January 6, 1838 – August 20, 1914) was an American educator, Methodist minister, and politician.

== Life ==
James was born on January 6, 1838, in Barnegat Light, New Jersey. He was the son of Rev. Job Edwards (1802-1871) and his second wife Susannah Haywood (1808-1895).

James attended Pennington Seminary (today The Pennington School) and graduated from Wesleyan University in 1860. He taught Natural Science for a year at the Amenia Seminary, New York, after which he started teaching at the East Greenwich Seminary (later known as the East Greenwich Academy) in Rhode Island. He intended to study law under William L. Dayton, but these plans were cut short after Dayton was sent to France as its new ambassador.

In 1862, James married Emma Atwood Baker (1838-1921). Their children were Grace Ella Baker (1864-1921), Laura Alice Lyman (1868-1944), and Florence Emily Sumwalt (1876-1959).

He enlisted in the 11th Regiment Rhode Island Volunteer Infantry to fight in the Civil War. He enlisted as a private, but was immediately given a commission by Governor William Sprague as second lieutenant. He was quickly elected first lieutenant of a company of YMCA volunteers. He was later made adjutant of a parole camp outside of Alexandria.

When he left the army in 1864, James returned to the East Greenwich Academy, where he was elected principal. He was also elected to the Rhode Island Senate, where he served from 1865 to 1869. While in the Senate, he helped to get the Fifteenth Amendment and a prohibition bill passed in the Senate, although both failed in the Assembly. In 1868, John was a Presidential Elector for Ulysses S. Grant, and was a Rhode Island Delegate for the 1866 National Union Convention.

In 1870, James left Rhode Island for the Chamberlain Institute in Randolph, Cattaraugus County, New York. He served as principal of the Institute for the next 22 years, resigning in 1892. He also received a Degree of Divinity from Allegheny College in Meadville, Pennsylvania, in 1876, and in 1890 was made a Doctor of Laws.

In 1891, the Republican James was nominated for the New York State Senate's 32nd District (Cattaraugus and Chautauqua counties) by the Democratic Party, the People's Party, and an Independent Republican Party. He won the election over Commodore P. Vedder and served in the State Senate in 1892 and 1893. After he left the State Senate, he served as principal of McDonogh School in Owings Mills, Maryland, from 1893 to 1898.

James was a Methodist minister, and was an elected delegate to the 1884 and 1892 General Conferences of the M. E. Church, a delegate to the 1884 Methodist centennial, and a member of the 1893 World's Parliament of Religions.

James died on August 20, 1914, in his family home in Randolph. He was buried in Randolph Cemetery.

New York State Senate
| Preceded by Commodore P. Vedder | New York State Senate; 32nd District; 1892–1893 | Succeeded by Frank W. Higgins |
