= Jermain Wesley Loguen =

African-American abolitionist (1813–1872)

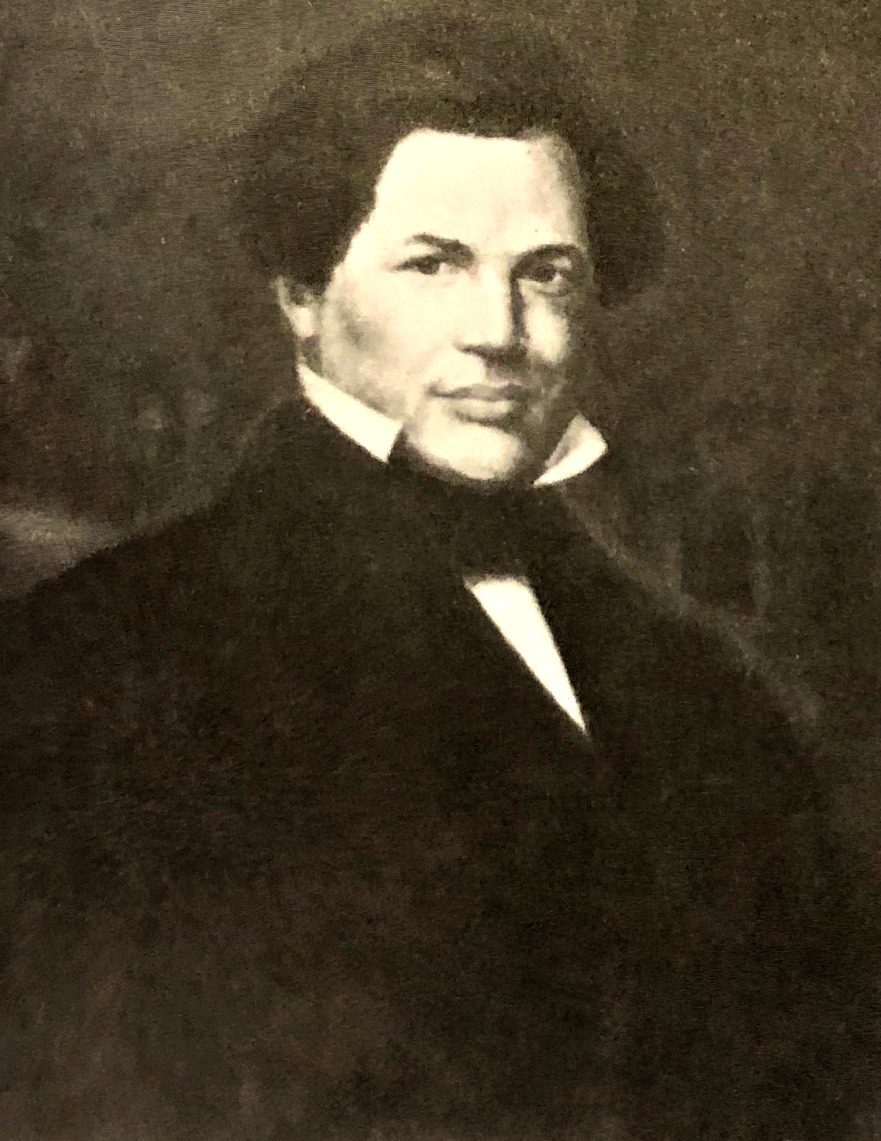
- Bishop Jermain Loguen, 1835
- Born: Jarm Logue; February 5, 1813; Davidson County, Tennessee
- Died: 30 September 1872 (aged 59)
- Occupations: Abolitionist, Public speaker Bishop of the African Methodist Episcopal Zion Church
- Spouse: Caroline Loguen
- Children: Sarah Loguen Fraser

Rev. Jermain Wesley Loguen (February 5, 1813 – September 30, 1872), born Jarm Logue, in slavery, was an American abolitionist and bishop of the African Methodist Episcopal Zion Church, and an author of a slave narrative.

== Biography ==
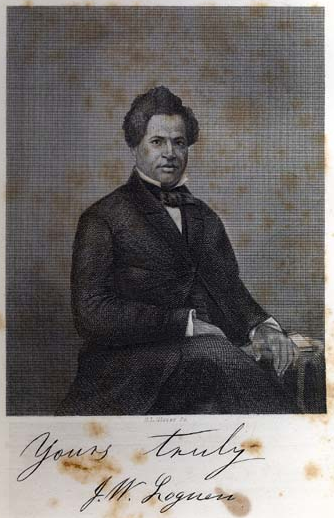
Engraving of J.W. Loguen from his 1859 Autobiography

Jarm Loguen was born to an enslaved woman named Cherry, in Davidson County, Tennessee, and her owner, a white man named David Logue. Cherry had been born free in Ohio, but was kidnapped and sold into slavery. At age 21, he successfully escaped bondage on his second attempt with the help of his mother, stealing his master's horse and following the Underground Railroad north, finally crossing into Canada. Jarm Logue added an "n" to the end of his last name, learned to read, worked various jobs in Canada and New York, studied at the Oneida Institute in Whitesboro, New York, and opened schools for black children in small cities across New York State, especially Utica and Syracuse. He was Utica's first African-American teacher.

In contrast with Frederick Douglass and many other fugitives, Loguen declined to ensure his safety by purchasing his freedom, or to allow others to purchase it for him, arguing that to do so would compromise his manhood and his "God-given gift of freedom."

In 1841 Loguen began teaching in Syracuse. From 1843 to 1846 he was a minister in Bath, New York, also teaching. From 1845 to 1846 Loguen was minister at St. James AME Zion Church in Ithaca, New York.^{Page needed} He was also briefly minister in Troy, New York.

Jarm and Caroline Loguen ran a major depot (stop) on the Underground Railroad. When they built their Syracuse home, they had a special “fugitive chamber” built for their operation. The Logue family did not hide the fact that they were helping runaway slaves; they published an invitation to fugitives, with their address, in the local newspaper. They would provide them with meals, a bath, and a sense of security. If any of the slaves decided to settle in the area, the Loguens would help them find a job. Jarm Logue was known as “‘King of the Underground Railroad.’ Caroline was his queen.”

Due in no small part to Loguen's labors, Syracuse became known as the most abolitionist city in the nation.

Loguen became an elder in the African Methodist Episcopal Zion Church and took the middle name Wesley after John Wesley, founder of the Methodist movement. He held various church posts and was appointed bishop in 1868.

Loguen became a popular abolitionist speaker and authored an autobiography, The Rev. J. W. Loguen, as a Slave and as a Freeman, a Narrative of Real Life (1859). The wife of his former master, Sarah Logue, wrote Loguen demanding $1,000 compensation. Loguen wrote a scathing reply, which was published in The Liberator.

== The Jerry Rescue ==
Loguen was involved in rescuing William Henry, a cooper and a former slave. On October 1, 1851, Henry, known as "Jerry," was arrested under the Fugitive Slave Law of 1850. The anti-slavery Liberty Party was holding its state convention in the city, and when word of the arrest spread, several hundred abolitionists both black and white broke into the city jail and freed Jerry. The event came to be widely known as the Jerry Rescue. After the rescue, several people accused Loguen of assaulting a federal marshal and encouraging the violence of others. Although Loguen admitted he was at the planning of the rescue, he denied participating in the storming of the building or committing any type of violence. Fearful of being returned to slavery, he took refuge in Canada. Once in Canada, Loguen wrote a letter to District Attorney Lawrence denying the charges made against him. He also wrote to New York Governor Washington Hunt, saying that he was willing to face trial if he could be assured that he would not be captured and returned to slavery. Loguen did not receive a reply to either letter.

After the trials concluded, and a letter was published in the Frederick Douglass’ Paper that claimed that Loguen would be safe in Syracuse, Loguen decided to come back to Syracuse. He was now confident that the Fugitive Slave Law was nullified in Syracuse, and so they conducted the Underground Railroad in an open manner. Loguen printed announcements about fugitives passing through Syracuse in newspapers, advertised his personal address, and gave reports of the amount of fugitives who came through his home.

== Family ==
Loguen married Caroline Storum, who was born near Jamestown, New York. She was biracial, from a free and educated abolitionist family. Jermain and Caroline had six children. Their daughter, Amelia, married Lewis Henry Douglass, oldest son of the famous abolitionist Frederick Douglass, in 1869. Amelia (Helen Amelia) and Lewis followed in their parents' footsteps, passionate for justice and education for the enslaved and newly freed.

After the Civil War and Lewis's safe return home, Amelia and Lewis rejoined the Loguen family in Syracuse, dedicated to teaching, reuniting, and rebuilding broken, destitute families after slavery. During the early 1860s, Amelia assisted her father while he preached (and ushered slaves to safety) in and around Binghamton, NY. She taught children (often from her own pocketbook) on Hawley Street at "School no. 8 for Colored children". As Black churches in that time often had to double as schoolrooms, Miss Amelia held adult night classes at the AME Zion church in Binghamton as well.

Another daughter, Sarah Loguen Fraser, became one of the first African-American women to become a licensed medical practitioner, and later became the first female doctor in the Dominican Republic.

== Legacy ==
In 2011 Loguen was inducted into the National Abolition Hall of Fame, in Peterboro, New York.

== Writing ==
- Loguen, Jermain Wesley (1859). The Rev. J. W. Loguen, as a Slave and as a Freeman. A Narrative of Real Life. Syracuse, NY: J. G. K. Truair & Co.
- Loguen, Jermain Wesley (2016). Williamson, Jennifer A. (ed.). The Rev. J.W. Loguen as a Slave and as a Freeman: A Narrative of Real Life. Syracuse, NY: Syracuse University Press.
- Loguen, Jermain Wesley (1993). "I am a fugitive slave". In Halliburton, Warren J. (ed.). Historic Speeches of African Americans. New York: Franklin Watts. pp. 42–46. ISBN 0531110346.
