= Mayville station (New York) =

Mayville
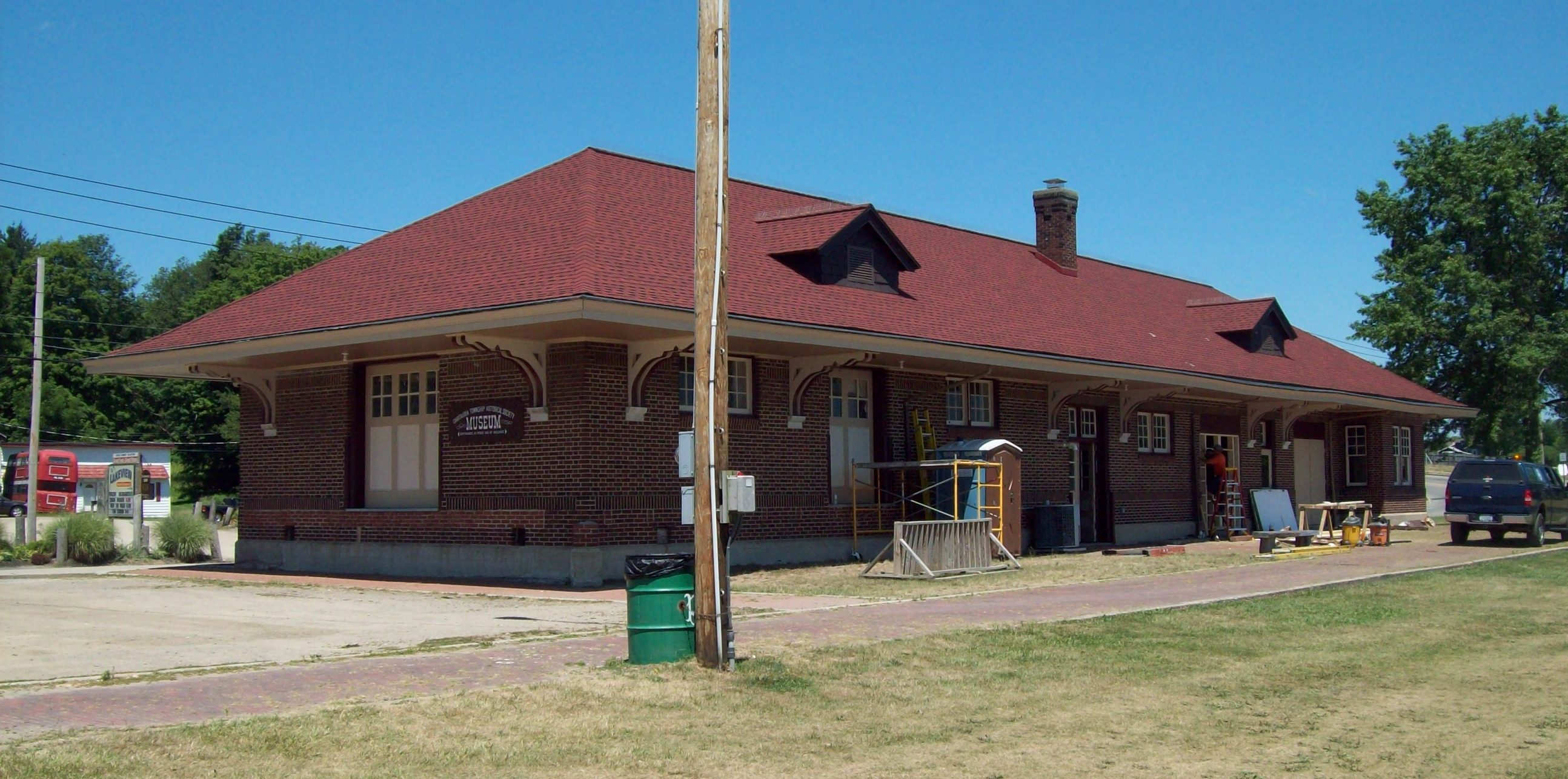
- Mayville station in July 2012

General information
- Location: Water Street, Mayville, Chautauqua County, New York 14747

History
- Closed: 1950
- Rebuilt: 1925

Services
Preceding station	Pennsylvania Railroad	Following station
Dunkirk toward Buffalo	Buffalo – Oil City	Corry toward Oil City
- Pennsylvania Railroad Station
- U.S. National Register of Historic Places
- Location within New York Location within the United States
- Location: Water Street, Mayville, New York
- Coordinates: 42°14′43″N 79°29′43″W
- Built: 1925
- Architect: Cookman, William H.; Peck, Lyman S.
- NRHP reference No.: 93000680
- Added to NRHP: August 06, 1993
Location

Mayville station is a historic train station located at Mayville in Chautauqua County, New York. It was constructed in 1925, for the Pennsylvania Railroad and is a 1 1/2-story, brick structure with an overhanging hipped roof. The building measures 117 by 29 feet (35.7 by 8.8 m). The station had were Pennsylvania Railroad trains on a route north to Dunkirk and then to Buffalo. To the south, the routed went to Corry and Oil City and then to Pittsburgh. From the station, travelers to resorts along Chautauqua Lake made connections to interurbans and large fleets of steamboats. The Chautauqua Traction Company served the communities on the western side of the lake; and the Jamestown, Westfield and Northwestern Railroad served the eastern side of the lake.

By August, 1949, the Pennsylvania Railroad had abandoned its service on the route north of Corry, thus isolating the station. It was abandoned by the Pennsylvania Railroad in 1950. The property was purchased by the Village of Mayville in 1968.

From June 1995 until the fall of 2000 the building served as a local access cable television studio. The Chautauqua Town Historical Society now operates part of the station as the Mayville Depot Museum, which features exhibits of local history, railroad artifacts, Chautauqua Lake, ice harvesting, furniture manufacturing and steamboats.

It was listed on the National Register of Historic Places in 1993 as the Pennsylvania Railroad Station.
