= Mayville, New York =

- Village
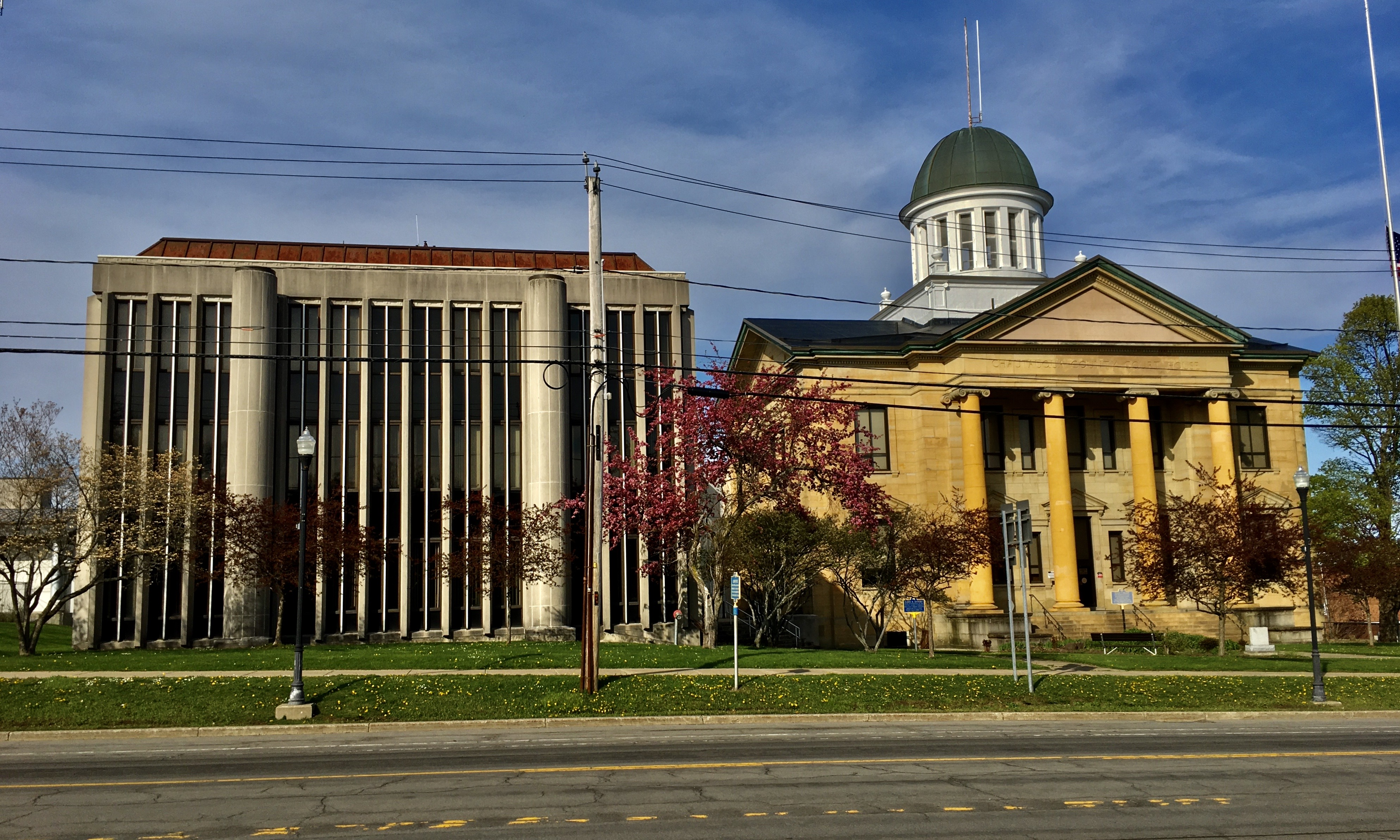
- Chautauqua County Courthouse, May 2021

- Location within the state of New York
- Coordinates: 42°15′5″N 79°30′0″W
- Country: United States
- State: New York
- County: Chautauqua
- Town: Chautauqua

Area
  - Total: 2.02 sq mi (5.23 km^{2})
  - Land: 2.02 sq mi (5.22 km^{2})
  - Water: 0.0039 sq mi (0.01 km^{2})
- Elevation: 1,453 ft (443 m)

Population (2020)
  - Total: 1,442
  - Density: 715.3/sq mi (276.19/km^{2})
- Time zone: UTC-5 (Eastern (EST))
  - Summer (DST): UTC-4 (EDT)
- ZIP code: 14757
- Area code: 716
- FIPS code: 36-46239
- GNIS feature ID: 0956714
- Website: villageofmayville.com

Mayville is a village in the town of Chautauqua, New York. It is the county seat of Chautauqua County. The population was 1,477 at the 2020 census, 13.7% less than in the 2010 census. The village and town offices share a building on Main Street, directly across from the Chautauqua County courthouse.

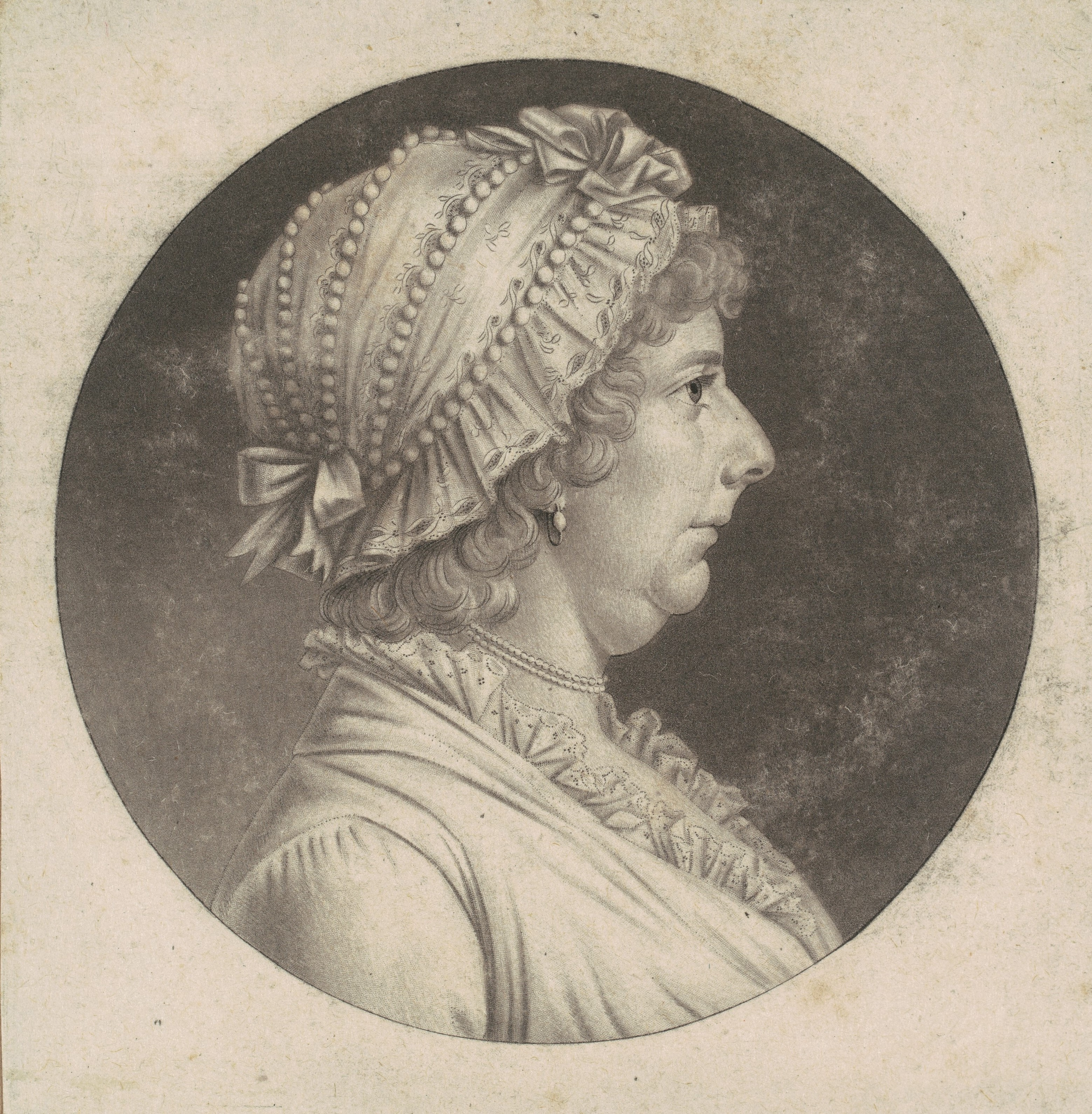
Elisabeth (May) Busti, 1759-1822 eponym of Mayville, New York

== History ==
The Holland Land Company anticipated establishing a village located at the eastern end of the Old Portage Road between Lake Erie and Chautauqua Lake. In 1804, the area was surveyed by William Peacock. In 1805, the village was named Mayville in honor of Elisabeth Busti (née May), wife of Paul Busti, Agent General of the Holland Land Company.

The 1808 legislation establishing the formation of Chautauqua County required the appointment of a committee to locate the county seat. Gov. Daniel D. Tompkins selected Jonas Williams (Batavia), Isaac Sutherland (Batavia) and Asa Ransom (Clarence) based on the recommendations of Joseph Ellicott, Resident Land Agent for the Holland Land Company in Batavia. The committee designated Mayville as the county seat, rubberstamping the Holland Land Company plan.

In 1804, Alexander McIntyre of Meadville, Pennsylvania became the first land owner in the future village. The Holland Land Company established a sales office in Mayville in 1810 with William Peacock as sub-agent.

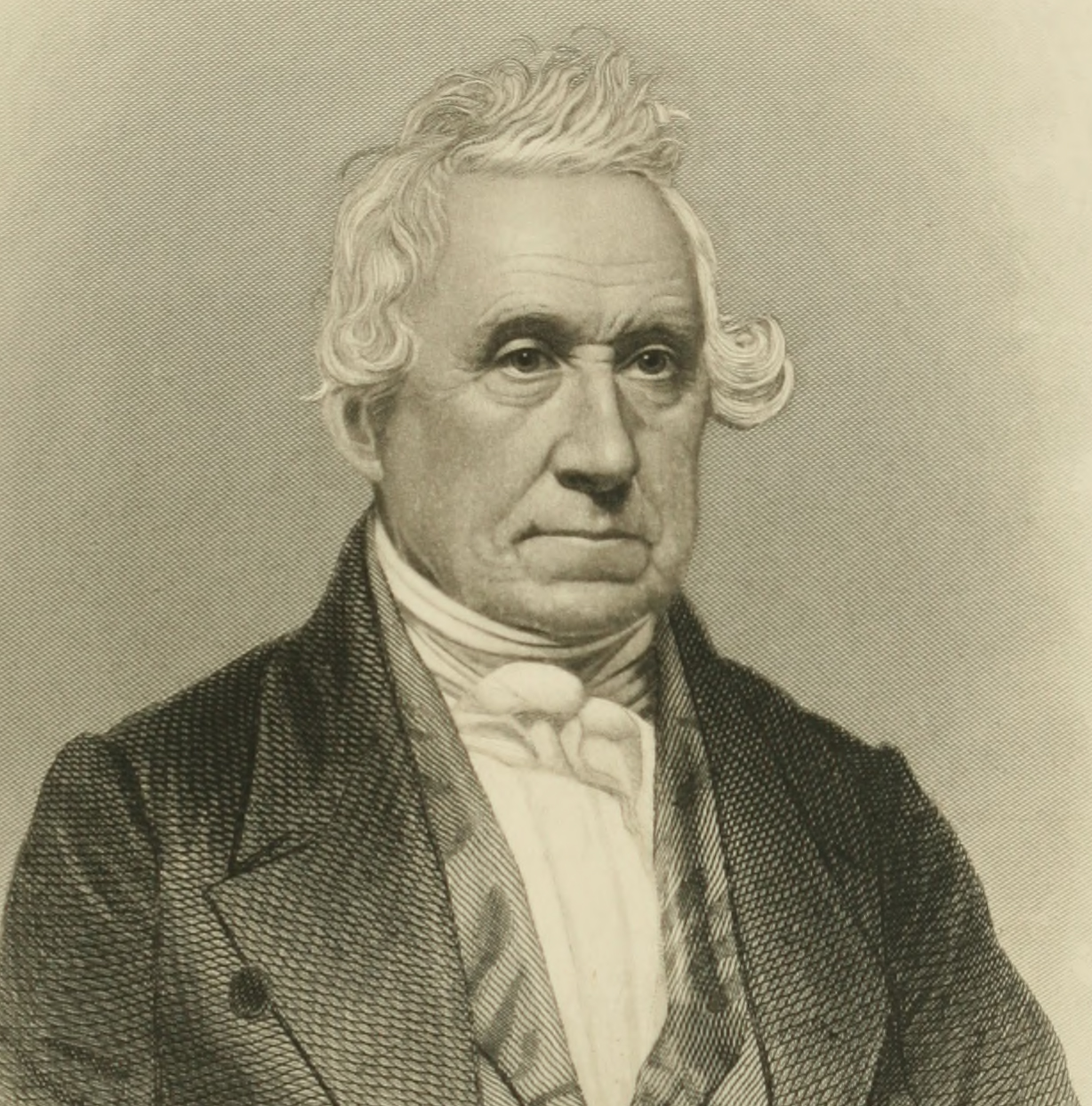
William Peacock, 1780-1877

The first Courthouse was a two-story wood framed building built by Winsor Brigham from 1811 to 1815.

The village of Mayville was incorporated in 1830. In 1836, local residents rioted against the Holland Land Company and broke into its office, destroying furniture and papers.

The second Courthouse was constructed under a contract to Benjamin Rathbun of Buffalo from 1834-1837. It was a Greek Revival temple form built of brick with six Doric columns.

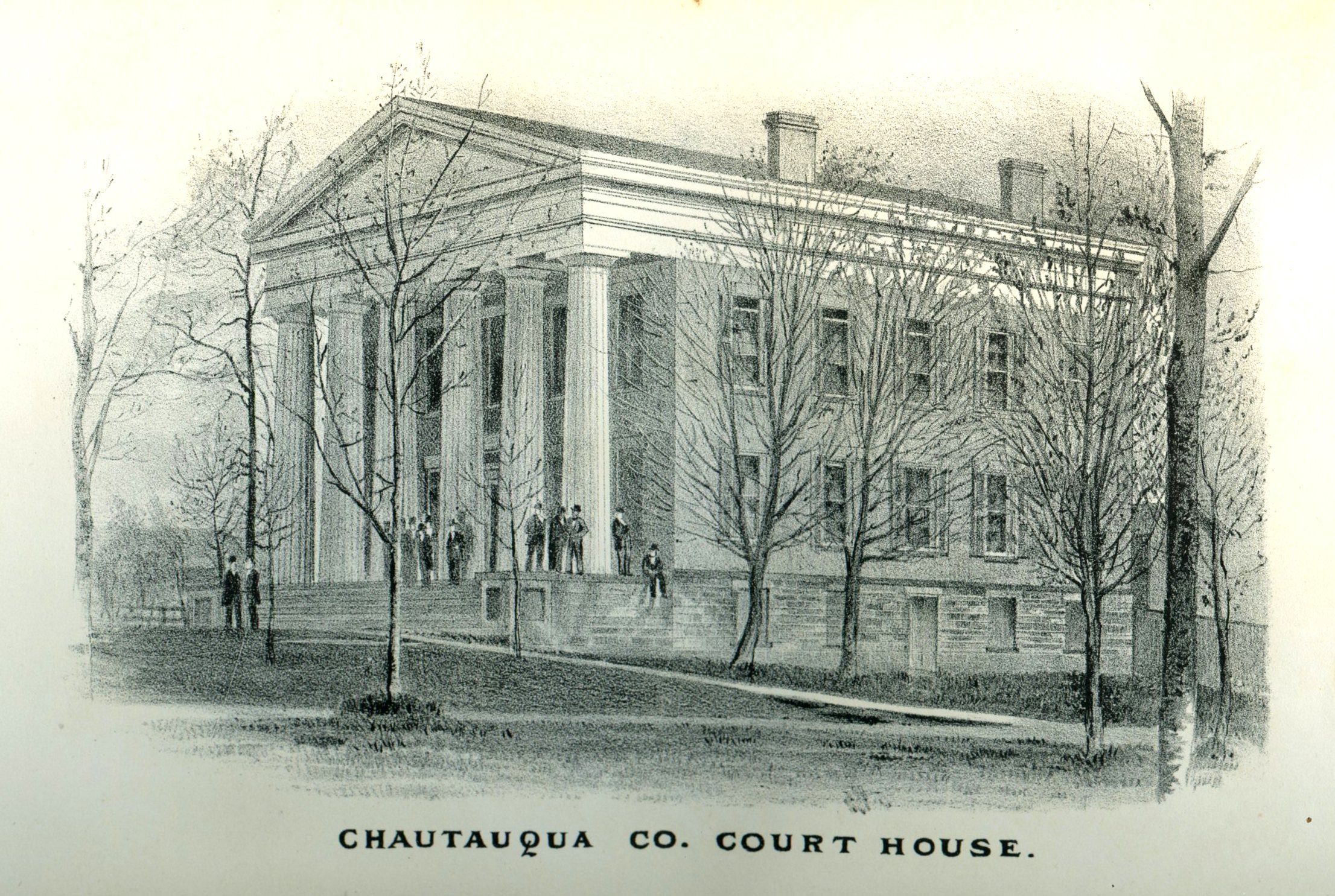
Chautauqua County Court House,1837-1907

The Pennsylvania Railroad built a train station and pier on the shores of Chautauqua Lake at Mayville. This station was on a PRR route from Pittsburgh to Dunkirk to Buffalo route. The Mayville station, along with the Jamestown boat landing at the south end of the lake, was the main mode of transportation to the rest of the communities around Chautauqua Lake via the large fleet of steamboats operating before the interurban lines were constructed. The Chautauqua Traction Company served the communities on the western side of the lake; and the Jamestown, Westfield and Northwestern Railroad was the interurban serving the east side of the lake. In modern times the steamboat Chautauqua Belle still operates out of Mayville, running between Point Chautauqua, Chautauqua Institution, and the vessel's home port in Mayville.

The Pennsylvania Railroad Station was listed on the National Register of Historic Places in 1993. The Point Chautauqua Historic District was listed in 1996.

The third (and current) Courthouse was designed by the Poughkeepsie architect William J. Beardsley and built by Shellberg, Lindquist, and Bailey from 1907-1909. This building was expanding in 1968 with the construction of a significant annex designed by local architects Naetzker, Thorsell & Dove.

== Geography ==
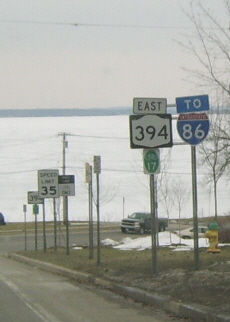
Route 394 along the west side of Chautauqua Lake in Mayville

Mayville is located near the geographic center of the town of Chautauqua at 42°15′5″N 79°30′0″W (42.251402, -79.500015). It is situated at the northwest end of Chautauqua Lake.

Mayville is at the junction of New York State Routes 394 and 430, 7 miles (11 km) south of the New York State Thruway (I-90) at Westfield.

Mayville is the nearest village to the Chautauqua Institution, which draws thousands of visitors during the summer months. Businesses in the village do a tourist business both with Chautauquans and with visitors to cottages and resorts on the east and west sides of the lake.

According to the United States Census Bureau, the village has a total area of 1.99 square miles (5.16 km^{2}), all land.

=== Climate ===
Mayville has a humid continental climate (Köppen Dfb), typical of southwestern New York state. Winters are cold and snowy, while summers are warm and humid.

Climate data for Mayville, NY
Month	Jan	Feb	Mar	Apr	May	Jun	Jul	Aug	Sep	Oct	Nov	Dec	Year
Mean daily maximum °F (°C)	34 (1)	36 (2)	46 (8)	57 (14)	69 (21)	78 (26)	82 (28)	79 (26)	72 (22)	61 (16)	49 (9)	39 (4)	59 (15)
Mean daily minimum °F (°C)	19 (−7)	19 (−7)	27 (−3)	37 (3)	49 (9)	58 (14)	63 (17)	62 (17)	55 (13)	45 (7)	35 (2)	25 (−4)	41 (5)
Average precipitation inches (mm)	2.46 (62)	2.40 (61)	2.98 (76)	3.39 (86)	3.65 (93)	4.37 (111)	4.15 (105)	4.45 (113)	5.30 (135)	4.75 (121)	4.42 (112)	3.51 (89)	45.83 (1,164)
Source: The Weather Channel

== Demographics ==
Historical population
Census	Pop.	Note	%±
1870	701		—
1880	1,051		49.9%
1890	1,164		10.8%
1900	943		−19.0%
1910	1,122		19.0%
1920	1,207		7.6%
1930	1,273		5.5%
1940	1,354		6.4%
1950	1,492		10.2%
1960	1,619		8.5%
1970	1,567		−3.2%
1980	1,626		3.8%
1990	1,636		0.6%
2000	1,756		7.3%
2010	1,711		−2.6%
2020	1,442		−15.7%
2021 (est.)	1,468	▲	1.8%
U.S. Decennial Census

As of the census of 2000, there were 1,756 people, 686 households, and 399 families residing in the village. The population density was 875.0 inhabitants per square mile (337.8/km^{2}). There were 860 housing units at an average density of 428.5 per square mile (165.4/km^{2}). The racial makeup of the village was 93.85% White, 3.64% African American, 0.51% Native American, 0.51% Asian, 0.17% from other races, and 1.31% from two or more races. Hispanic or Latino of any race were 1.59% of the population.

There were 686 households, out of which 27.0% had children under the age of 18 living with them, 44.9% were married couples living together, 9.5% had a female householder with no husband present, and 41.8% were non-families. 36.6% of all households were made up of individuals, and 16.8% had someone living alone who was 65 years of age or older. The average household size was 2.22 and the average family size was 2.92.

In the village, the population was spread out, with 21.8% under the age of 18, 10.1% from 18 to 24, 29.8% from 25 to 44, 22.2% from 45 to 64, and 16.1% who were 65 years of age or older. The median age was 38 years. For every 100 females, there were 114.4 males. For every 100 females age 18 and over, there were 118.3 males.

The median income for a household in the village was $32,250, and the median income for a family was $45,595. Males had a median income of $30,574 versus $24,028 for females. The per capita income for the village was $16,561. About 5.5% of families and 10.2% of the population were below the poverty line, including 10.5% of those under age 18 and 8.4% of those age 65 or over.

== Notable people ==
- Leslie Carter, singer
- Henry Cousins, Wisconsin state assemblyman
- Carlton Brandaga Curtis, former US congressman from Pennsylvania
- Michael H. Hall, Wisconsin state assemblyman
- Donald Mackenzie, explorer, fur trader and former governor of the Red River Colony
- Thomas Rodman Merritt, Upper Canada political figure
- Vin Moore, film director
- Lorenzo Morris, former New York state senator
- Victor M. Rice, former New York State Superintendent of Public Instruction and New York state assemblyman
- Albion W. Tourgée, lawyer, author, and editor; represented Homer Plessy in the infamous Plessy v. Ferguson (1896) case
- Samuel S. Whallon, former New York state assemblyman, Canal Commissioner
