= Old Portage Road =

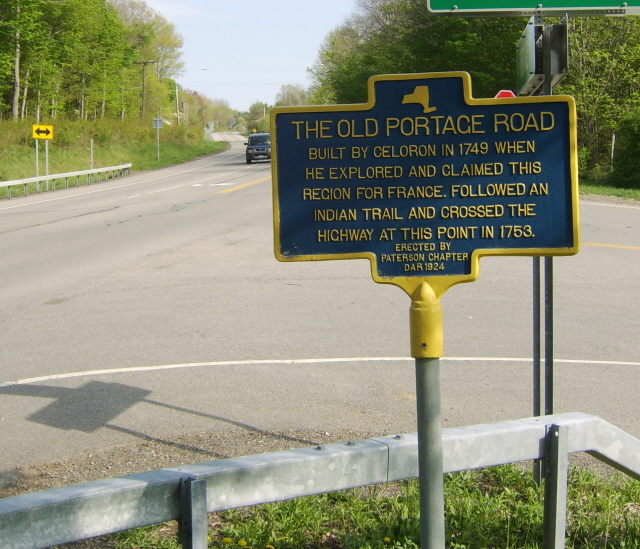
Historical marker on NY 394 east of Westfield commemorating the Old Portage Road.

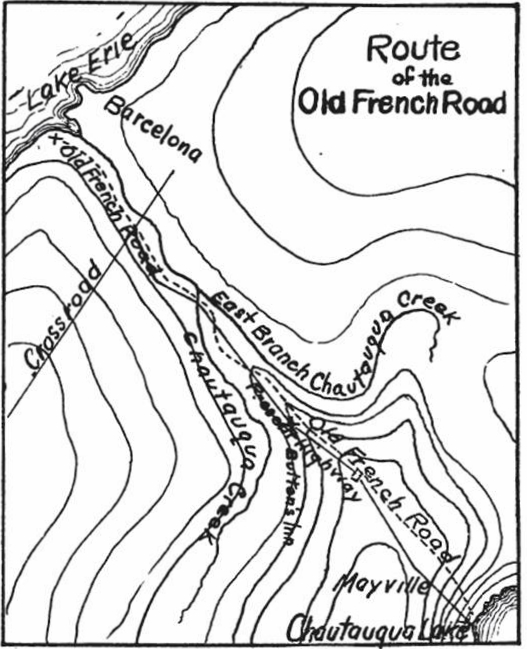
Hand drawn illustration of the French Portage Road, c. 1912.

Old Portage Road, also known as Old French Road and as French Portage Trail, was a Native American trail and later a road in present-day Chautauqua County, New York, that connected Lake Erie and Chautauqua Lake, and thereby the Great Lakes and the Mississippi River systems. Lake Erie is approximately 700 feet above sea level; the continental crest on this portage route between the St. Lawrence and Mississippi drainage basins is approximately 1500 feet above sea level.

== History ==
It is believed that Étienne Brûlé was the first European to use the trail in 1615. In 1749, an expedition under the command of Celeron de Bienville landed at the mouth of Chautauqua Creek on Lake Erie with the intent of claiming the Ohio Valley for the French. They hacked out a road to Chautauqua Lake through the forests that lined the trail on their way to the Allegheny River and thus to the Ohio River.

In 1753, an expedition of 1,000 men converted the wagon road into a military road, used to supply men and materiel to the series of fortifications built by the French along the Allegheny River - Fort Le Boeuf, Fort Machault, and Fort Duquesne. The trail fell into disuse after the start of the French and Indian War in 1754, when the focus of the war moved elsewhere.

The British briefly re-established the trail in 1782, during the latter stages of the American Revolutionary War when they used Chautauqua Lake as a staging area to assail Fort Pitt, then held by colonials. The plan was aborted once it became clear that such an attack would futile.

Remnants of the portage road remain to this day; most of the NY 394 highway between the two waterbodies is named Portage Street, and a loop road off NY 394 south of the village of Westfield is called Old Portage Road. The loop road follows the original crossing of Little Chautauqua Creek, and ends at an abandoned closed-spandrel arch bridge.

== See also ==
- New York State Route 394
