= Lorenzo Morris =

American politician

Lorenzo Morris (August 14, 1817 Smithfield, New York – October 2, 1903 Fredonia, New York) was an American lawyer and politician from New York.

== Life ==
He was the son of David Morris. The family removed to a farm near Mayville, New York in 1829. He attended the public schools and graduated from Mayville Academy in 1836. Then he studied law, was admitted to the bar in 1841, and practiced in Jamestown. In 1844, he returned to Mayville, and in 1852, removed to Fredonia. He was Postmaster of Fredonia from 1854 to 1860.

He was a member of the New York State Senate (32nd D.) in 1868 and 1869. He was a member of the Constitutional Commission of 1872–73.

He was buried at the Forest Hill Cemetery in Fredonia.

== Sources ==
- The New York Civil List compiled by Franklin Benjamin Hough, Stephen C. Hutchins and Edgar Albert Werner (1870; pg. 444) [gives wrong first name "Lewis"]
- Life Sketches of the State Officers, Senators, and Members of the Assembly of the State of New York in 1868 by S. R. Harlow & S. C. Hutchins (pg. 109ff)
- Courts and Lawyers of New York: A History, 1609–1925 by Alden Chester & Edwin Melvin Williams (Vol. I; pg. 713ff, "The Constitutional Commission of 1872")
- Pomfret by Todd Langworthy ("Images of America" series, Arcadia Publishing, 2008, pg. 25) [with portrait]
- Obituary Notes; Ex-State Senator LORENZO MORRIS... in NYT on October 3, 1903
- The Democratic Party in the State of New York by James K. McGuire (1905; Vol. III, pg. 456f)

New York State Senate
Preceded by Walter L. Sessions	New York State Senate; 32nd District; 1868–1869	Succeeded by Allen D. Scott
