= Ashville, New York =

- Hamlet
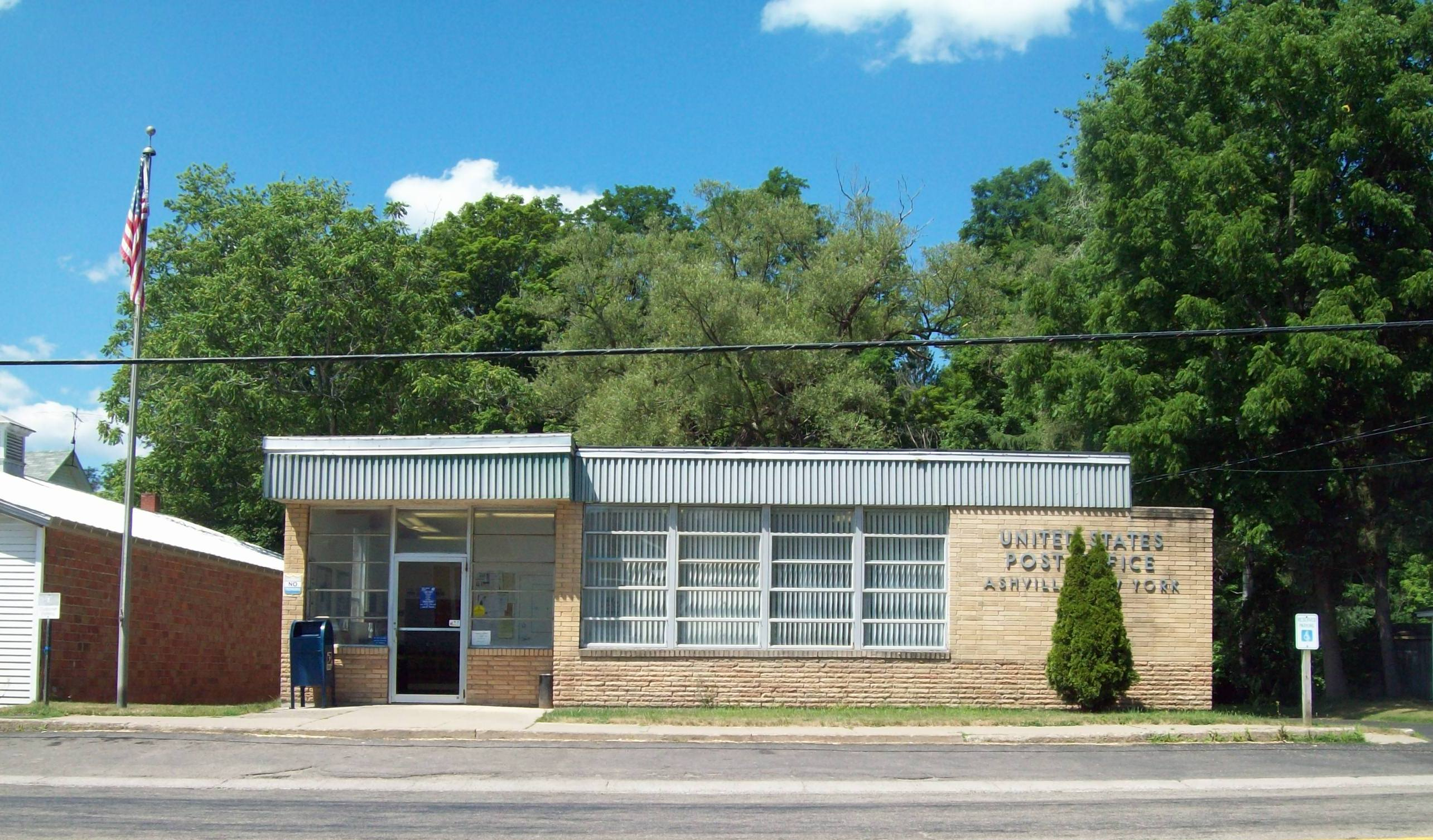
- U.S. Post Office, July 2012

- Location of Ashville in New York Ashville (the United States)
- Coordinates: 42°5′47″N 79°22′32″W
- Country: United States
- State: New York
- County: Chautauqua
- Town: North Harmony
- Elevation: 1,358 ft (414 m)
- Time zone: UTC-5 (Eastern (EST))
  - Summer (DST): UTC-4 (EDT)
- ZIP code: 14710
- Area code: 716
- GNIS feature ID: 942643

Ashville is a hamlet near the junction of state routes 474 and 394, on the line between the towns of North Harmony and Busti in Chautauqua County, New York, United States. It is the location of the Smith Bly House, listed on the National Register of Historic Places in 1974.
