= Panama, New York =

- Village
- Location within the state of New York
- Coordinates: 42°5′N 79°29′W
- Country: United States
- State: New York
- County: Chautauqua
- town: Harmony

Area
  - Total: 2.22 sq mi (5.74 km^{2})
  - Land: 2.21 sq mi (5.72 km^{2})
  - Water: 0.0077 sq mi (0.02 km^{2})
- Elevation: 1,552 ft (473 m)

Population (2020)
  - Total: 475
  - Density: 215.1/sq mi (83.04/km^{2})
- Time zone: UTC-5 (Eastern (EST))
  - Summer (DST): UTC-4 (EDT)
- ZIP code: 14767
- Area code: 716
- FIPS code: 36-56231
- GNIS feature ID: 0959806
- Website: www.panamany.com

Panama is a village in Chautauqua County, New York, United States. The population was 465 at the 2020 census. Panama is in the northwest part of the town of Harmony, at the junction of State Route 474 (Main Street) and County Route 33.

The village is named after Panama Rocks, a large rock formation south of the village. Paleozoic fossils are visible in the outcrops. This site has become a tourist attraction, and the owners charge admission at the gate.

== History ==
The village of Panama was incorporated in 1861.

Among many early settlers was George Hawkins, who purchased Lot 50 in 1825. He was born in 1802 in Oneida County, New York. About 1827 he married Rhoda Powers (born 1806). Together they cleared land to make a living. George died in 1883 and Rhoda in 1900. Rhoda's father was Simeon Powers, who established a Baptist church in the area. George's parents are unknown. Both are buried in Panama Union cemetery under one headstone.

The U.S. Post Office at Panama was established in 1826. That was the first, officially recorded, use of the name "Panama". The traditional story is that Panama got its name from someone who had been across the Isthmus of Panama, and said local rock formations reminded him of Panama's rocks. It is possible that this person was Moses Cushman Marsh, who operated a trading company in Panama, and was Panama's first postmaster. He had previously had a business in Cuba, and he may have been across the Isthmus of Panama. His daughter was the educator and writer, Mary Louise Nash (1826-1896).

== Geography ==
According to the United States Census Bureau, the village has a total area of 2.2 square miles (5.7 km^{2}), of which 0.008 square miles (0.02 km^{2}), or 0.27%, is water.

== Notable people ==
- Albert G. Dow, former New York state senator
- Abner Lewis, former US congressman
- James H. McGraw, founder of the McGraw-Hill Publishing Co., born in Panama December 17, 1860
- Mary Louise Nash (1826-1896), educator and writer; born in Panama

== Demographics ==
Historical population
| Census | Pop. | Note | %± |
|---|---|---|---|
| 1870 | 650 | | — |
| 1880 | 473 | | −27.2% |
| 1890 | 379 | | −19.9% |
| 1900 | 359 | | −5.3% |
| 1910 | 337 | | −6.1% |
| 1920 | 298 | | −11.6% |
| 1930 | 320 | | 7.4% |
| 1940 | 374 | | 16.9% |
| 1950 | 456 | | 21.9% |
| 1960 | 450 | | −1.3% |
| 1970 | 489 | | 8.7% |
| 1980 | 511 | | 4.5% |
| 1990 | 468 | | −8.4% |
| 2000 | 491 | | 4.9% |
| 2010 | 479 | | −2.4% |
| 2020 | 475 | | −0.8% |
| 2021 (est.) | 461 | ▼ | −2.9% |
U.S. Decennial Census

As of the census of 2000, there were 491 people, 191 households, and 135 families residing in the village. The population density was 226.4 inhabitants per square mile (87.4/km^{2}). There were 208 housing units at an average density of 95.9 per square mile (37.0/km^{2}). The racial makeup of the village was 96.74% White, 1.02% African American, 0.20% Native American, 0.20% Asian, 0.41% from other races, and 1.43% from two or more races. Hispanic or Latino of any race were 0.61% of the population.

There were 191 households, out of which 31.9% had children under the age of 18 living with them, 61.3% were married couples living together, 7.9% had a female householder with no husband present, and 29.3% were non-families. 22.5% of all households were made up of individuals, and 14.7% had someone living alone who was 65 years of age or older. The average household size was 2.57 and the average family size was 3.07.

In the village, the population was spread out, with 26.7% under the age of 18, 5.9% from 18 to 24, 25.7% from 25 to 44, 25.5% from 45 to 64, and 16.3% who were 65 years of age or older. The median age was 40 years. For every 100 females, there were 97.2 males. For every 100 females age 18 and over, there were 88.5 males.

The median income for a household in the village was $31,250, and the median income for a family was $38,125. Males had a median income of $31,944 versus $20,833 for females. The per capita income for the village was $16,410. About 9.6% of families and 11.7% of the population were below the poverty line, including 18.0% of those under age 18 and 7.0% of those age 65 or over.
