= Western New York =

- Region
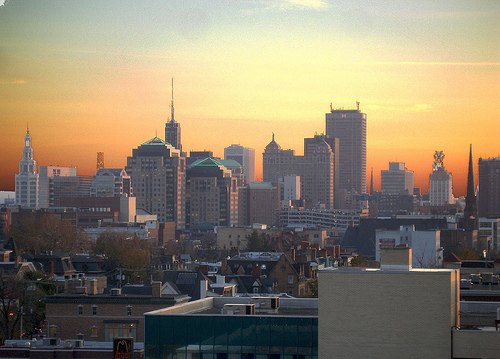
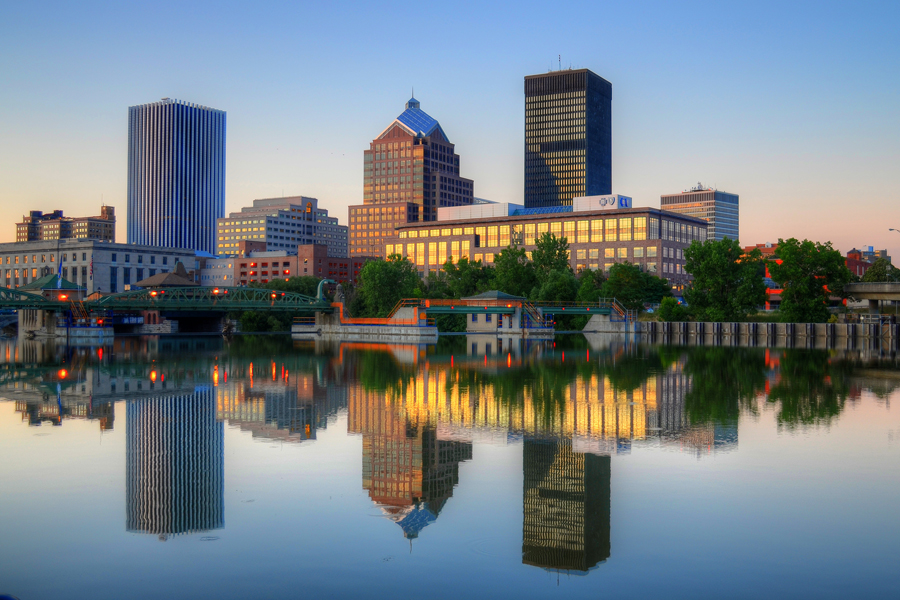
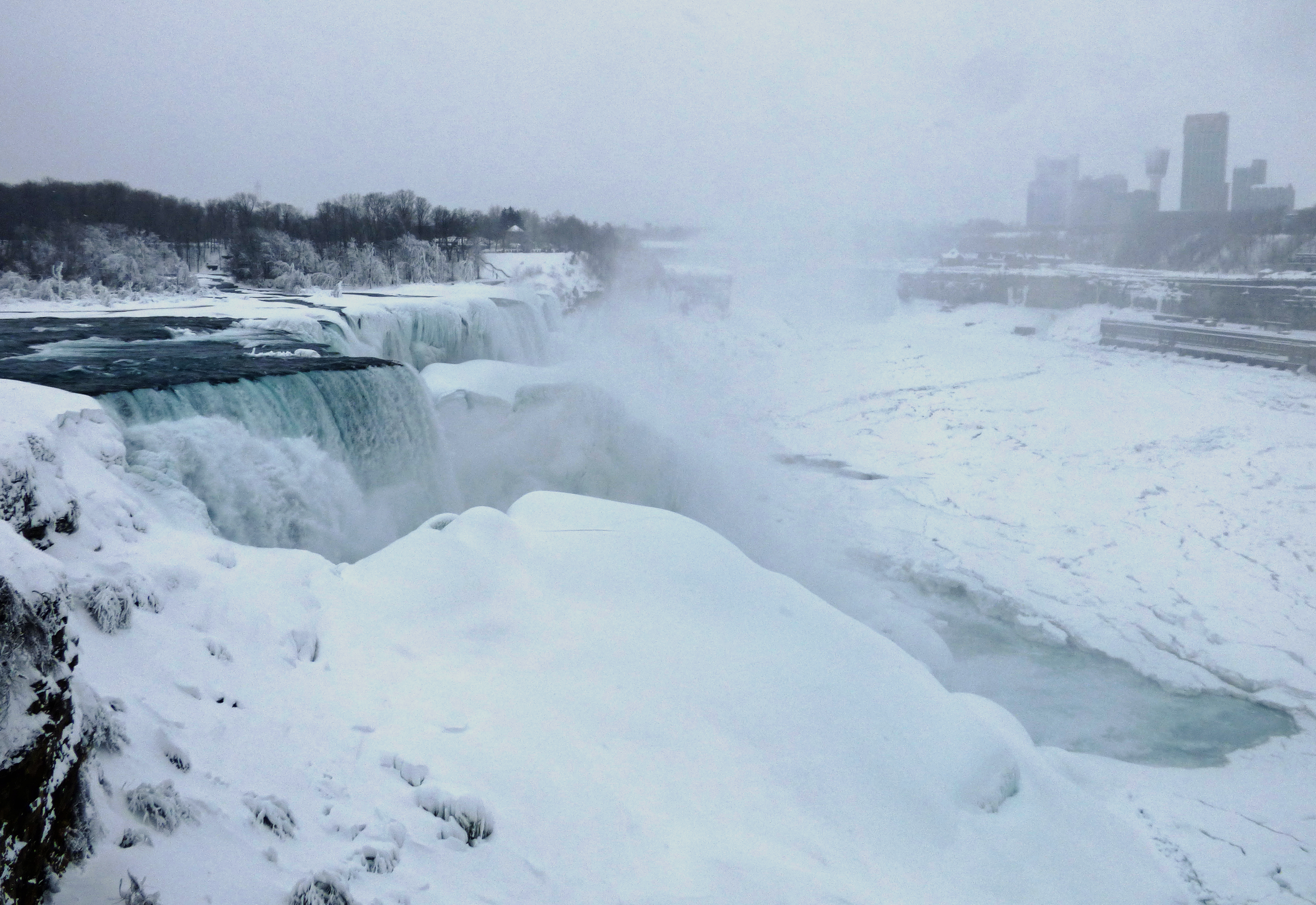
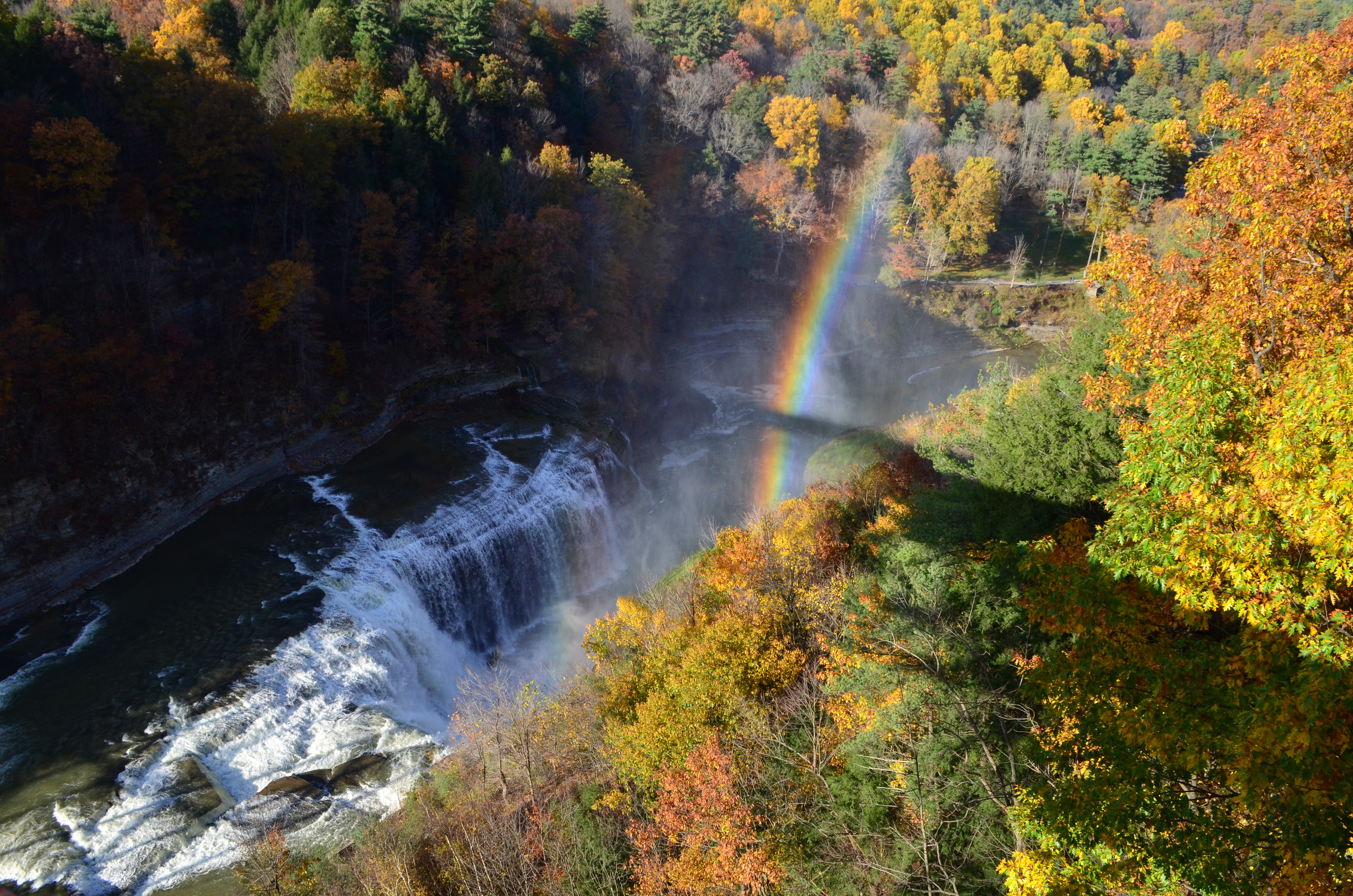
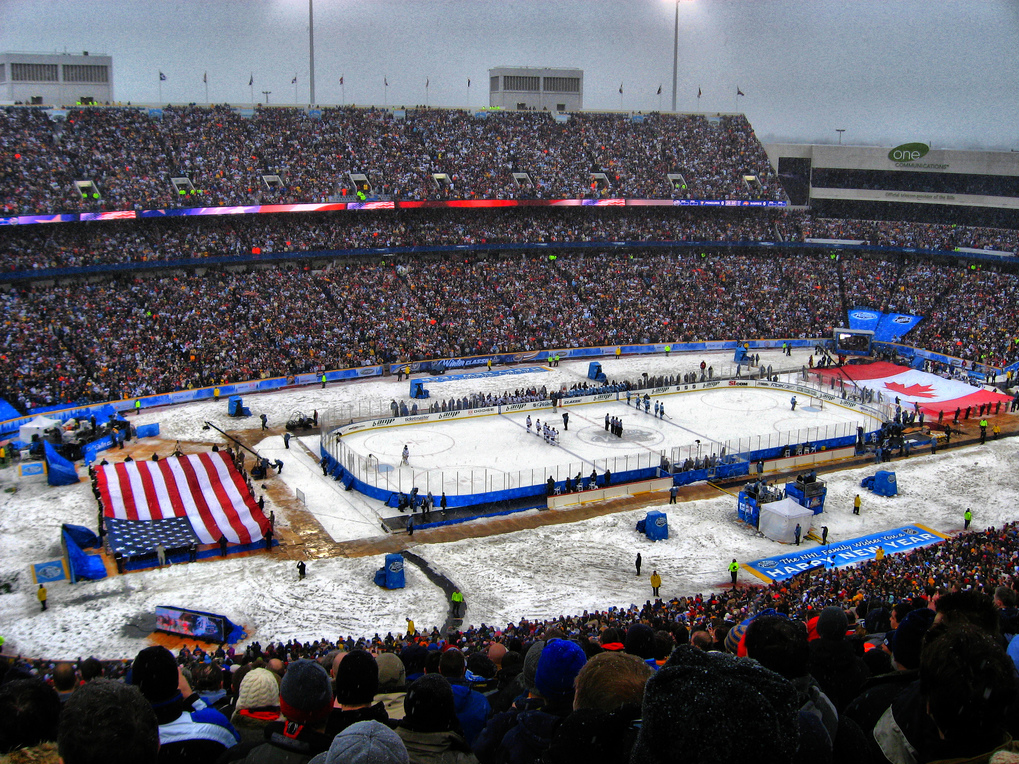
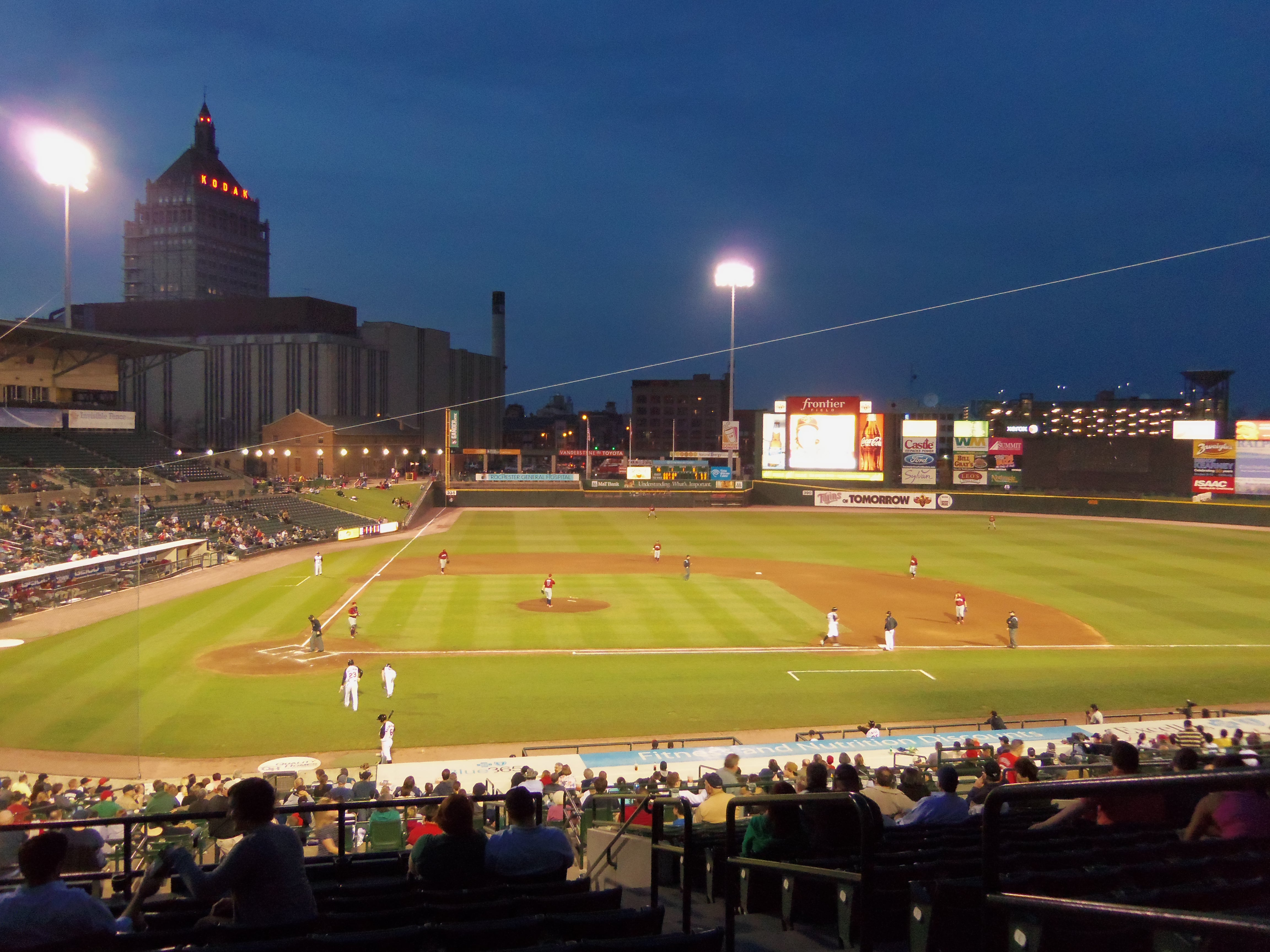
- Left to right from top: Buffalo's skyline, Rochester's skyline, Niagara Falls in the winter, Letchworth State Park in autumn, the 2008 NHL Winter Classic at Ralph Wilson Stadium, a nighttime game at ESL Ballpark.

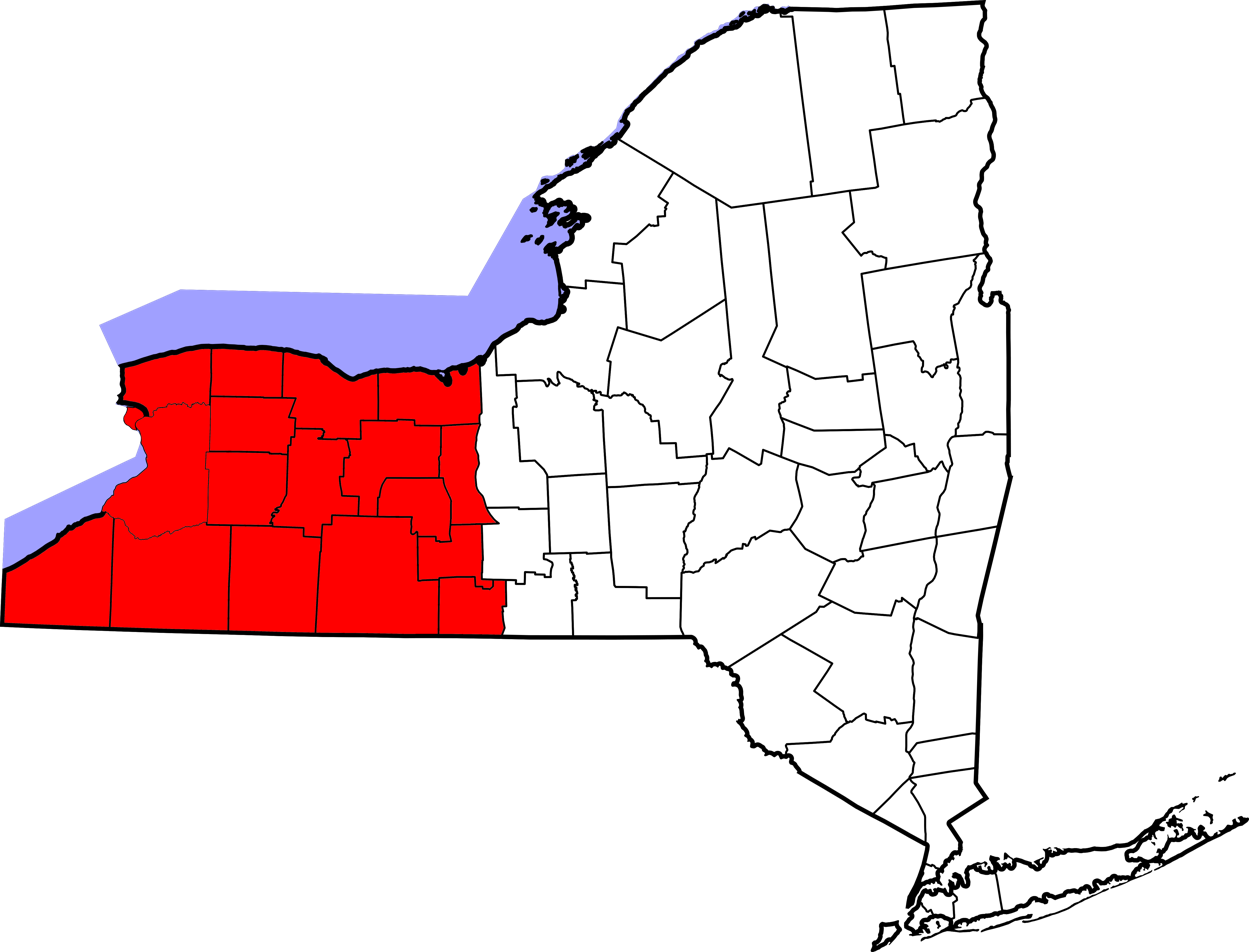
- Western New York counties
- Country: United States
- State: New York
- Region: Western New York
- Counties: Allegany, Cattaraugus, Chautauqua, Chemung, Erie, Genesee, Livingston, Monroe, Niagara, Ontario, Orleans, Schuyler, Seneca, Steuben, Wayne, Wyoming, Yates
- Cities: Buffalo, Rochester, Niagara Falls, Batavia, Jamestown, Lockport, Canandaigua, North Tonawanda, Geneva

Area
  - Total: 15,107 sq mi (39,130 km^{2})

Population (2017)
  - Total: 2,800,878
  - Density: 185.40/sq mi (71.584/km^{2})
- Time zone: UTC−5 (Eastern Standard Time)
  - Summer (DST): UTC−4 (Eastern Daylight Time)
- Area code: 315, 585, 607, 716, 624

Western New York (WNY) is the westernmost region of the U.S. state of New York. The eastern boundary of the region is not consistently defined by state agencies or those who call themselves "Western New Yorkers". Almost all sources agree WNY includes the cities of Buffalo, Niagara Falls, Jamestown, and the surrounding suburbs, as well as the outlying rural areas of Niagara Frontier, and Chautauqua-Alleghany (or the western Southern Tier). Many would also place Rochester and the Genesee Valley in the region, although these locations are also sometimes included in the Finger Lakes Region.

The State of New York sometimes defines the WNY region as including just five counties: Allegany, Cattaraugus, Chautauqua, Erie, and Niagara. The state's Empire State Development Corporation and state health authorities have both mapped the region this way. The state has also used this regional boundary to set policy during the COVID-19 pandemic.

More commonly, WNY has been defined to include at least Genesee, Orleans, and Wyoming counties as well. Almost all descriptions of WNY in the Buffalo media market define it as this eight county area. Most organizations that use WNY in their name including the WNY College Consortium, the WNY Genealogical Society, WNY PRISM, the Psychological Association of WNY, and the WNY Land Conservancy describe themselves as working in these eight counties.

Others, such as Clarion Publications, the publisher of the WNY Travel Guide and WesternNY.com, have used the term Western New York to describe a much larger area consisting of 17 counties. In addition to those counties mentioned, they add Chemung, Livingston, Monroe, Ontario, Schuyler, Seneca, Steuben, Wayne, and Yates as well.

The rest of this article uses that definition. The 17 counties have a land area of 11,764 square miles (30,470 km^{2}). They include the area of the Holland Purchase and the Phelps and Gorham Purchase.

The area is primarily served by Buffalo and Rochester media markets, although there is considerable overlap between these two markets, as well as other American and Canadian media markets (particularly from nearby Toronto)[citation needed]. In terms of the combined statistical areas used by the United States Census Bureau, Western New York consists of the Buffalo–Cheektowaga–Olean, NY area, the Rochester–Batavia–Seneca Falls, NY area, and the Elmira–Corning, NY area.

Western New York is in some contexts considered a sub-region of "Upstate New York" (when that term is used to describe all of New York State outside Long Island and the New York City metropolitan area).

== Subregions ==
Western New York is generally considered to have 2–4 subregions:

1. Greater Niagara
2. Chautauqua–Allegheny
3. Genesee
4. Western Finger Lakes (sometimes considered part of Central New York)

The Greater Niagara Region (or the Niagara Frontier), comprises Niagara and Erie counties and parts of Genesee and Wyoming counties. It is named for its major features, the Niagara river and Niagara Falls. Buffalo is its largest urban center.

The Chautauqua–Allegheny Region (also known as Southwestern New York or the Western Southern Tier) comprises Chautauqua, Cattaraugus, and Allegany counties. The region is mountainous. The largest urban center is Jamestown, and Chautauqua Lake and Allegany State Park are major geographical features.

The third region, the Genesee Region, comprises Monroe, Livingston, Wayne, Orleans, Ontario, and Yates counties and parts of Genesee and Wyoming counties. Rochester is its largest urban center. Letchworth State Park is a major geographical feature.

The fourth region is that of the western Finger Lakes Region composed of parts of Seneca, Steuben, Schuyler, and Chemung counties. While parts of the Finger Lakes are considered within Western New York (as either a region or quadrant) the eastern portions are typically considered a part of Central New York.

The Genesee region and Western Finger Lakes region are often combined and described as the Finger Lakes region.

Western New York also includes several Seneca Nation of Indians enclaves.

== Population ==
If it were counted as a single area, the population of Western New York would number just over 2.6 million, and would rank as the 24th largest metropolitan area of the United States, between the Pittsburgh metropolitan area and the Sacramento, California metropolitan area. However, the U.S. Census Bureau has classified the Buffalo and Rochester areas as two different metropolitan areas. If it were counted as a state, the population of Western New York would rank as the 37th most populated state in the United States.

- Allegany County, population 48,357
- Cattaraugus County, population 79,458
- Chautauqua County, population 133,539
- Chemung County, population 88,911
- Erie County, population 954,236
- Genesee County, population 59,977
- Livingston County, population 64,810
- Monroe County, population 759,443
- Niagara County, population 215,124
- Ontario County, population 108,519
- Orleans County, population 42,836
- Schuyler County, population 18,514
- Seneca County, population 35,305
- Steuben County, population 99,063
- Wayne County, population 92,962
- Wyoming County, population 41,892
- Yates County, population 25,344

== Incorporated places ==
The following cities are found in the 17 western counties:

- Batavia
- Buffalo
- Canandaigua
- Corning
- Dunkirk
- Elmira
- Geneva
- Hornell
- Jamestown
- Lackawanna
- Lockport
- Niagara Falls
- North Tonawanda
- Olean
- Rochester
- Salamanca
- Tonawanda

The following villages are found in the 17 western counties:

- Addison
- Akron
- Albion
- Alden
- Alexander
- Alfred
- Allegany
- Almond
- Andover
- Angelica
- Angola
- Arcade
- Arkport
- Attica
- Avoca,
- Avon
- Barker
- Bath
- Belmont
- Bemus Point
- Bergen
- Blasdell
- Bloomfield
- Bolivar
- Brockport
- Brocton
- Burdett
- Caledonia
- Canaseraga
- Canisteo
- Cassadaga
- Castile
- Cattaraugus
- Celoron
- Cherry Creek
- Churchville
- Clarence
- Clifton Springs
- Clyde
- Cohocton
- Corfu
- Cuba
- Dansville
- Delevan
- Depew
- Dresden
- Dundee
- Dunkirk
- East Aurora
- East Randolph
- East Rochester
- Eden
- Elba
- Ellicottville
- Elmira Heights
- Fairport
- Falconer
- Farnham
- Forestville
- Franklinville
- Fredonia
- Gainesville
- Geneseo
- Gowanda
- Hamburg
- Hammondsport
- Hilton
- Holley
- Honeoye Falls
- Horseheads
- Interlaken
- Kenmore
- Lakewood
- Lancaster
- Le Roy
- Leicester
- Lewiston
- Lima
- Limestone
- Little Valley
- Livonia
- Lodi
- Lyndonville
- Lyons
- Lockport
- Macedon
- Manchester
- Mayville
- Medina
- Middleport
- Millport
- Montour Falls
- Mount Morris
- Naples
- Newark
- Newfane
- North Collins
- North Hornell
- North Tonawanda
- Nunda
- Oakfield
- Odessa
- Orchard Park
- Ovid
- Painted Post
- Palmyra
- Panama
- Pavilion
- Penn Yan
- Perry
- Perrysburg
- Phelps
- Pike
- Pittsford
- Portville
- Randolph
- Red Creek
- Richburg
- Riverside
- Rushville
- Savona
- Scottsville
- Sherman
- Shortsville
- Silver Creek
- Silver Springs
- Sinclairville
- Sloan
- Sodus
- Sodus Point
- South Corning
- South Dayton
- Spencerport
- Springville
- Tonawanda
- Van Etten
- Victor
- Warsaw
- Waterloo
- Watkins Glen
- Wayland
- Webster
- Wellsburg
- Wellsville
- Westfield
- Williamsville
- Wilson
- Wolcott
- Wyoming
- Youngstown

== Climate ==
Lake-effect snow is a major contributor to snowfall totals in western New York

Western New York has a humid continental climate heavily influenced by both Lake Erie and Lake Ontario. Winters are long and cold, often lasting from around mid-November to early April. There are often snows before and after that period, as well. Western New York is known for its lake effect snows, which can result in highly localized, sometimes intense and even historic snow events. Lake effect storms are a result of cold air picking up water vapor as it blows over warm lake waters. Lake effect snows are usually most active between November and February and typically diminish when Lake Erie freezes over. Generally, the heaviest amount of snow in Western New York during the winter falls near the southern end of Erie County as well as in Cattaraugus, Chautauqua, and Wyoming counties. Spring and fall in Western New York are usually short and changeable. The presence of the lakes allows for fruit growing and wine production along areas adjacent to both lakes, which retard the development of damaging spring and fall frost, thereby extending the growing season. Lost in its famed winters, Western New York summers are among the sunniest in the Northeast and are generally very pleasant. Thanks in part to breezes blowing over Lakes Erie and Ontario (which are usually cooler than the air temperature in the summer), most of Western New York enjoy generally cooler and more comfortable summers than other regions in the same climatic zone.

Climate data for Buffalo (Buffalo Niagara International Airport), 1991–2020 normals, (Note: Mean monthly maxima and minima (i.e. the expected highest and lowest temperature readings at any point during the year or given month) calculated based on data at said location from 1991 to 2020.) extremes 1871–present (Note: Official records for Buffalo kept January 1871 to June 1943 at downtown and at Buffalo Niagara Int'l since July 1943. For more information, see Threadex)
Month	Jan	Feb	Mar	Apr	May	Jun	Jul	Aug	Sep	Oct	Nov	Dec	Year
Record high °F (°C)	72 (22)	71 (22)	82 (28)	94 (34)	94 (34)	97 (36)	98 (37)	99 (37)	98 (37)	92 (33)	80 (27)	74 (23)	99 (37)
Mean maximum °F (°C)	56.4 (13.6)	54.5 (12.5)	66.0 (18.9)	77.9 (25.5)	84.3 (29.1)	88.1 (31.2)	89.5 (31.9)	88.5 (31.4)	86.4 (30.2)	77.9 (25.5)	67.4 (19.7)	56.8 (13.8)	91.5 (33.1)
Mean daily maximum °F (°C)	32.1 (0.1)	33.3 (0.7)	41.8 (5.4)	54.7 (12.6)	67.4 (19.7)	75.6 (24.2)	80.2 (26.8)	79.0 (26.1)	72.3 (22.4)	59.6 (15.3)	47.8 (8.8)	37.2 (2.9)	56.8 (13.8)
Daily mean °F (°C)	25.5 (−3.6)	26.4 (−3.1)	34.1 (1.2)	45.6 (7.6)	57.9 (14.4)	66.9 (19.4)	71.7 (22.1)	70.4 (21.3)	63.4 (17.4)	51.7 (10.9)	41.0 (5.0)	31.4 (−0.3)	48.8 (9.3)
Mean daily minimum °F (°C)	19.0 (−7.2)	19.5 (−6.9)	26.4 (−3.1)	36.5 (2.5)	48.3 (9.1)	58.1 (14.5)	63.1 (17.3)	61.7 (16.5)	54.5 (12.5)	43.9 (6.6)	34.2 (1.2)	25.6 (−3.6)	40.9 (4.9)
Mean minimum °F (°C)	0.8 (−17.3)	1.7 (−16.8)	9.3 (−12.6)	24.6 (−4.1)	35.6 (2.0)	45.6 (7.6)	52.8 (11.6)	51.0 (10.6)	41.0 (5.0)	30.7 (−0.7)	20.4 (−6.4)	8.5 (−13.1)	−2.8 (−19.3)
Record low °F (°C)	−16 (−27)	−20 (−29)	−7 (−22)	5 (−15)	25 (−4)	35 (2)	43 (6)	38 (3)	32 (0)	20 (−7)	2 (−17)	−10 (−23)	−20 (−29)
Average precipitation inches (mm)	3.35 (85)	2.49 (63)	2.89 (73)	3.37 (86)	3.37 (86)	3.37 (86)	3.23 (82)	3.23 (82)	4.10 (104)	4.03 (102)	3.50 (89)	3.75 (95)	40.68 (1,033)
Average snowfall inches (cm)	26.7 (68)	18.1 (46)	14.1 (36)	2.5 (6.4)	0.0 (0.0)	0.0 (0.0)	0.0 (0.0)	0.0 (0.0)	0.0 (0.0)	0.9 (2.3)	7.8 (20)	25.3 (64)	95.4 (242)
Average extreme snow depth inches (cm)	10.8 (27)	8.4 (21)	7.6 (19)	1.0 (2.5)	0.0 (0.0)	0.0 (0.0)	0.0 (0.0)	0.0 (0.0)	0.0 (0.0)	0.1 (0.25)	3.7 (9.4)	9.0 (23)	15.5 (39)
Average precipitation days (≥ 0.01 in)	19.2	15.8	14.8	13.4	12.8	11.9	10.8	10.0	10.9	14.1	14.4	17.7	165.8
Average snowy days (≥ 0.1 in)	16.4	13.5	9.1	3.2	0.0	0.0	0.0	0.0	0.0	0.4	4.7	12.2	59.5
Average relative humidity (%)	76.0	75.9	73.3	67.8	67.2	68.6	68.1	72.1	74.0	72.9	75.8	77.6	72.4
Average dew point °F (°C)	16.9 (−8.4)	17.6 (−8.0)	25.2 (−3.8)	33.4 (0.8)	44.2 (6.8)	54.1 (12.3)	59.0 (15.0)	58.8 (14.9)	52.5 (11.4)	41.7 (5.4)	32.7 (0.4)	22.6 (−5.2)	38.2 (3.5)
Mean monthly sunshine hours	91.3	108.0	163.7	204.7	258.3	287.1	306.7	266.4	207.6	159.4	84.4	69.0	2,206.6
Percentage possible sunshine	31	37	44	51	57	63	66	62	55	47	29	25	49
Average ultraviolet index	1	2	4	6	7	8	8	8	6	4	2	1	5
Source 1: NOAA (relative humidity and sun 1961–1990)
Source 2: Weather Atlas

Climate data for Rochester, New York (Greater Rochester Int'l), 1991–2020 normals, (Note: Mean monthly maxima and minima (i.e. the expected highest and lowest temperature readings at any point during the year or given month) calculated based on data at said location from 1991 to 2020.) extremes 1871−present (Note: Official records for Rochester kept January 1871 to September 1940 at downtown and at Greater Rochester Int'l since October 1940. For more information, see Threadex)
Month	Jan	Feb	Mar	Apr	May	Jun	Jul	Aug	Sep	Oct	Nov	Dec	Year
Record high °F (°C)	74 (23)	73 (23)	86 (30)	93 (34)	94 (34)	100 (38)	102 (39)	99 (37)	99 (37)	91 (33)	81 (27)	72 (22)	102 (39)
Mean maximum °F (°C)	57.2 (14.0)	55.1 (12.8)	67.1 (19.5)	79.9 (26.6)	86.7 (30.4)	90.5 (32.5)	92.1 (33.4)	90.4 (32.4)	87.7 (30.9)	80.0 (26.7)	68.5 (20.3)	57.5 (14.2)	93.4 (34.1)
Mean daily maximum °F (°C)	33.4 (0.8)	35.2 (1.8)	43.6 (6.4)	55.5 (13.1)	69.4 (20.8)	77.9 (25.5)	82.5 (28.1)	80.5 (26.9)	73.6 (23.1)	61.2 (16.2)	49.1 (9.5)	38.5 (3.6)	58.5 (14.7)
Daily mean °F (°C)	26.2 (−3.2)	27.4 (−2.6)	35.2 (1.8)	46.8 (8.2)	58.8 (14.9)	67.6 (19.8)	72.3 (22.4)	70.7 (21.5)	63.6 (17.6)	52.2 (11.2)	41.5 (5.3)	32.0 (0.0)	49.5 (9.7)
Mean daily minimum °F (°C)	19.0 (−7.2)	19.6 (−6.9)	26.8 (−2.9)	37.1 (2.8)	48.2 (9.0)	57.4 (14.1)	62.2 (16.8)	61.0 (16.1)	53.6 (12.0)	43.3 (6.3)	34.0 (1.1)	25.4 (−3.7)	40.6 (4.8)
Mean minimum °F (°C)	−0.8 (−18.2)	0.5 (−17.5)	8.4 (−13.1)	24.1 (−4.4)	34.4 (1.3)	43.9 (6.6)	50.7 (10.4)	49.2 (9.6)	39.6 (4.2)	29.7 (−1.3)	18.6 (−7.4)	7.7 (−13.5)	−3.7 (−19.8)
Record low °F (°C)	−17 (−27)	−22 (−30)	−9 (−23)	7 (−14)	26 (−3)	35 (2)	42 (6)	36 (2)	28 (−2)	19 (−7)	1 (−17)	−16 (−27)	−22 (−30)
Average precipitation inches (mm)	2.55 (65)	2.13 (54)	2.49 (63)	2.99 (76)	2.86 (73)	3.37 (86)	3.56 (90)	3.31 (84)	3.18 (81)	3.22 (82)	2.76 (70)	2.67 (68)	35.09 (891)
Average snowfall inches (cm)	27.4 (70)	23.1 (59)	17.9 (45)	3.0 (7.6)	0.1 (0.25)	0.0 (0.0)	0.0 (0.0)	0.0 (0.0)	0.0 (0.0)	0.1 (0.25)	8.1 (21)	22.3 (57)	102.0 (259)
Average extreme snow depth inches (cm)	9.2 (23)	8.6 (22)	9.3 (24)	1.5 (3.8)	0.0 (0.0)	0.0 (0.0)	0.0 (0.0)	0.0 (0.0)	0.0 (0.0)	0.0 (0.0)	3.3 (8.4)	6.4 (16)	13.8 (35)
Average precipitation days (≥ 0.01 in)	19.6	16.4	15.4	13.4	12.4	11.5	11.2	10.3	11.1	13.9	14.9	18.1	168.2
Average snowy days (≥ 0.1 in)	17.6	15.0	10.1	3.0	0.1	0.0	0.0	0.0	0.0	0.2	5.7	13.5	65.2
Average relative humidity (%)	74.0	74.1	71.0	67.0	67.2	69.4	69.7	74.3	76.8	74.5	76.3	77.5	72.6
Average dew point °F (°C)	16.3 (−8.7)	17.2 (−8.2)	25.0 (−3.9)	34.0 (1.1)	45.1 (7.3)	55.0 (12.8)	59.9 (15.5)	59.7 (15.4)	53.4 (11.9)	42.3 (5.7)	33.3 (0.7)	22.8 (−5.1)	38.7 (3.7)
Mean monthly sunshine hours	108.3	118.1	177.7	216.5	266.5	297.6	314.4	273.4	212.3	154.4	81.5	77.5	2,298.2
Percentage possible sunshine	37	40	48	54	59	65	68	63	57	45	28	28	52
Source: NOAA (relative humidity, dew point, and sun 1961–1990)

== Transportation ==
=== Major highways ===
Interstate System

- Interstate 90, also known as the New York State Thruway
- Interstate 86 in the Southern Tier
- Interstate 190 in the Buffalo–Niagara Falls Metropolitan area
- Interstate 290 in the Buffalo–Niagara Falls Metropolitan area
- Interstate 390 (the former U.S. Route 15) in the Genesee Valley region
- Interstate 490 in the Rochester Metro area
- Interstate 590 in the Rochester Metro area
- Interstate 990 in the Buffalo–Niagara Falls Metropolitan area

U.S. Routes

- U.S. Route 20
- U.S. Route 20a
- U.S. Route 62
- U.S. Route 219

=== Major airports ===
Western New York has two airports that provide significant regular passenger service, Buffalo–Niagara International Airport and Greater Rochester International Airport. Buffalo–Niagara International Airport is the most patronized airport facility in Western New York. While it primarily serves as the regional airport for the Buffalo–Niagara Falls Metropolitan Area, the facility doubles as a gateway to Canada, and a good portion of its passengers (33%) are Canadian. The second major airport in Western New York, Greater Rochester International Airport, does not see as much traffic as Buffalo–Niagara International Airport. Still, located just three nautical miles southwest of Downtown Rochester, the facility provides convenient access to airline service for many residents of the Rochester Metropolitan Area.

=== Railroad service ===
The northern part of Western New York features four railroad stations in service on the Empire Corridor: Rochester, Buffalo–Depew, Buffalo–Exchange Street and Niagara Falls. The Buffalo–Exchange Street and Niagara Falls stations do not see as much rail service as the other two Western New York stations due to the fact that, west of Depew Station, Amtrak's Lake Shore Limited leaves the Empire Corridor en route to the Midwest. For a period of time, there were proposals to service these four stations with high-speed rail. A major objective of implementing high-speed rail service was to better connect Western New York as well as the rest of Upstate New York with New York City. However, little of substance has come of these proposals.

Service to other parts of Western New York ended from the mid-1960s to 1970. The Erie Lackawanna's Phoebe Snow served on a southeastern trajectory from Buffalo to Elmira, Binghamton, Scranton and Hoboken; service ended in 1966. The E-L's Lake Cities originated in Chicago, passing through Western New York's Jamestown, then through the rest of the Southern Tier, Orange County and terminating at Hoboken, NJ; service ended on January 6, 1970. The Pennsylvania Railroad's Buffalo Day Express was another route serving Western New York, traveling south to Baltimore via Olean and Harrisburg; this train was discontinued in 1967, but an unnamed Penn Central (PC) successor lasted through April 30, 1971, when AMTRAK assumed most of the remaining U.S. rail passenger service but declined to serve the Baltimore-Harrisburg-Buffalo route of the former PRR/PC.

The Buffalo and Pittsburgh Railroad and WNY&P both operate freight service in the region. A few shortline railroads also offer rail service, including the New York and Lake Erie Railroad and the Arcade and Attica Railroad.

=== Bus service ===
The Niagara Frontier Transportation Authority runs regular bus service throughout the Buffalo–Niagara Falls metropolitan area. The Rochester-Genesee Regional Transportation Authority serves Rochester and surrounding counties, and the Chautauqua Area Regional Transit System serves Chautauqua County. First Transit contracts with the Seneca Nation of Indians, the Olean Area Transit System, and Access Allegany to provide public transportation to most of the Southern Tier.

In addition to the public transportation authorities, which provide limited intercity connections, several commercial intercity bus services also operate. Coach USA operates a loop service between Buffalo, Jamestown and Olean; the bus connects to a route to New York City in Olean and to Megabus service to Toronto and New York City in Buffalo. Fullington Trailways operates a daily rural route between Buffalo and various locations in Pennsylvania; New York Trailways also serves Buffalo and Rochester, connecting to various locations, as does Greyhound Bus Lines. One discount "Chinatown service" operates in Western New York; Ocean Travel runs an overnight express service between Buffalo, Rochester and New York City.

== History ==
In its early history, Western New York was settled by native cultures including the Hopewell. The territory of Western New York, until the 17th century, was held by the Neutral Nation in the northern Niagara region and the Wenrohronon and Erie Indians around the Allegheny River. The Seneca people and their allies in the Haudenosaunee Confederacy eliminated those tribes in wars during the Beaver Wars between 1638 and 1701, with any survivors being assimilated into the Senecas (in the case of the Erie and Neutral) or Huron (in the case of the Wenro). The Neutral territory is currently held by Tuscaroras, who moved up from the Carolinas while refugees from the Erie tribes moved south to the Carolinas.

French forces settled in parts of what is now Western New York through much of the 17th century, beginning with Étienne Brûlé's pass-through of the region in 1615 and Joseph de La Roche Daillon's missionary journeys in the 1620s; some relics of their presence, including Fort Niagara and a portage road that follows modern New York State Route 394 between Lake Erie and Chautauqua Lake, are still visible in the region.

Western New York's land was acquired from the Iroquois through the Nanfan Treaty, which ceded the territory to England at the end of the Beaver Wars in 1701. At the time, four of the British colonies (Pennsylvania, New York, Massachusetts and Connecticut) laid claim to the unsettled territory, as did New France until the Seven Years' War. Most of Western New York was officially off-limits to all of the colonies as a result of the establishment of an Indian Reserve over the area following the Seven Years' War. By the 1780s, only New York and Massachusetts still maintained their claims to the territory, which was separated from mainland New York by a Preemption Line.

Under federal policy designed to extinguish the states' Revolutionary War debts, the states were required to extinguish their western land claims. Massachusetts extinguished its claim to the territory in exchange for receiving the profits from its sale to settlers. New York was the only colony not to extinguish its western claim, and by way of the 1786 Treaty of Hartford, the land, with the exception of a small triangle that was ceded to Pennsylvania in 1792, officially became Western New York. (Had New York extinguished its claim, it would have likely become part of the Northwest Territory established the next year and formed part of a new state.) Native title, with the exception of several reservations, was extinguished in the Treaty of Canandaigua in 1794, while the Phelps and Gorham Purchase and Holland Purchase opened the territory for settling. During the War of 1812 Western New York was part of the borderland frontier between the United States and British Canada and became the scene of various military actions.

The two major Western New York cities, Buffalo and Rochester, benefited greatly from the opening of the Erie Canal. With its strategic position at the western end of the Erie Canal, the eastern end of Lake Erie and proximity to Niagara Falls and Canada, Buffalo emerged as a major port. Niagara Falls provided Buffalo with a ready supply of power, so much so that one of its enduring nicknames is "The City of Light". Buffalo experienced steady growth during the 19th century and at one point was one of the 10 most populated cities in the United States. According to some, Rochester was "America's First Boomtown" and was a key player in the flour industry (hence its initial nickname "Flour City"). Its growth was attributed to both the completion of the Erie Canal and its resulting significance in the flour industry. Olean was originally planned to be a similar major hub, but it proved to be at a major disadvantage: located near the headwaters of the Allegheny River (a factor its planners had hoped would make the city a gateway to the Midwest), the river was too shallow to support large boat travel or shipping on a consistent basis. As a region, Western New York played a significant role in the American economy during the 19th century. Large scale immigration from Ireland, Italy, Poland, Great Britain and Germany soon followed into the region.

The New Religious Movement known as Spiritualism was among several that arose in the early 19th century burned-over district of Western New York. Its major center is Lily Dale, one of the largest spiritualism communities in the United States. The original house of the Fox sisters was relocated to Lily Dale in 1916. Joseph Smith Jr., founder of the Latter Day Saint movement, reported receiving the Book of Mormon in Palmyra, Wayne County. The women's civic organization Zonta was founded in Buffalo in 1919.

In the late 20th century this area became part of the Rust Belt of the United States, being a focal point for the transportation of grain, steel, and coal. The opening of the Welland Canal in 1957 effectively rendered the narrower Erie Canal obsolete, further exacerbating economic problems in the region. The area saw an economic decline during the period of deindustrialization, leaving many empty steel mills including those of Bethlehem Steel, which was the 2nd largest steel mill in the world. The plant located in Lackawanna, New York provided nearly 25,000 jobs to the local economy. Republic Steel also had a large integrated steel mill located in South Buffalo. General Motors in Tonawanda is the largest vehicle engine plant in the world, which still is a major contributor to the Buffalo area economy. Ford Motor Company also maintains a large manufacturing facility in Woodlawn, New York, which is just south of Buffalo.

== Culture ==
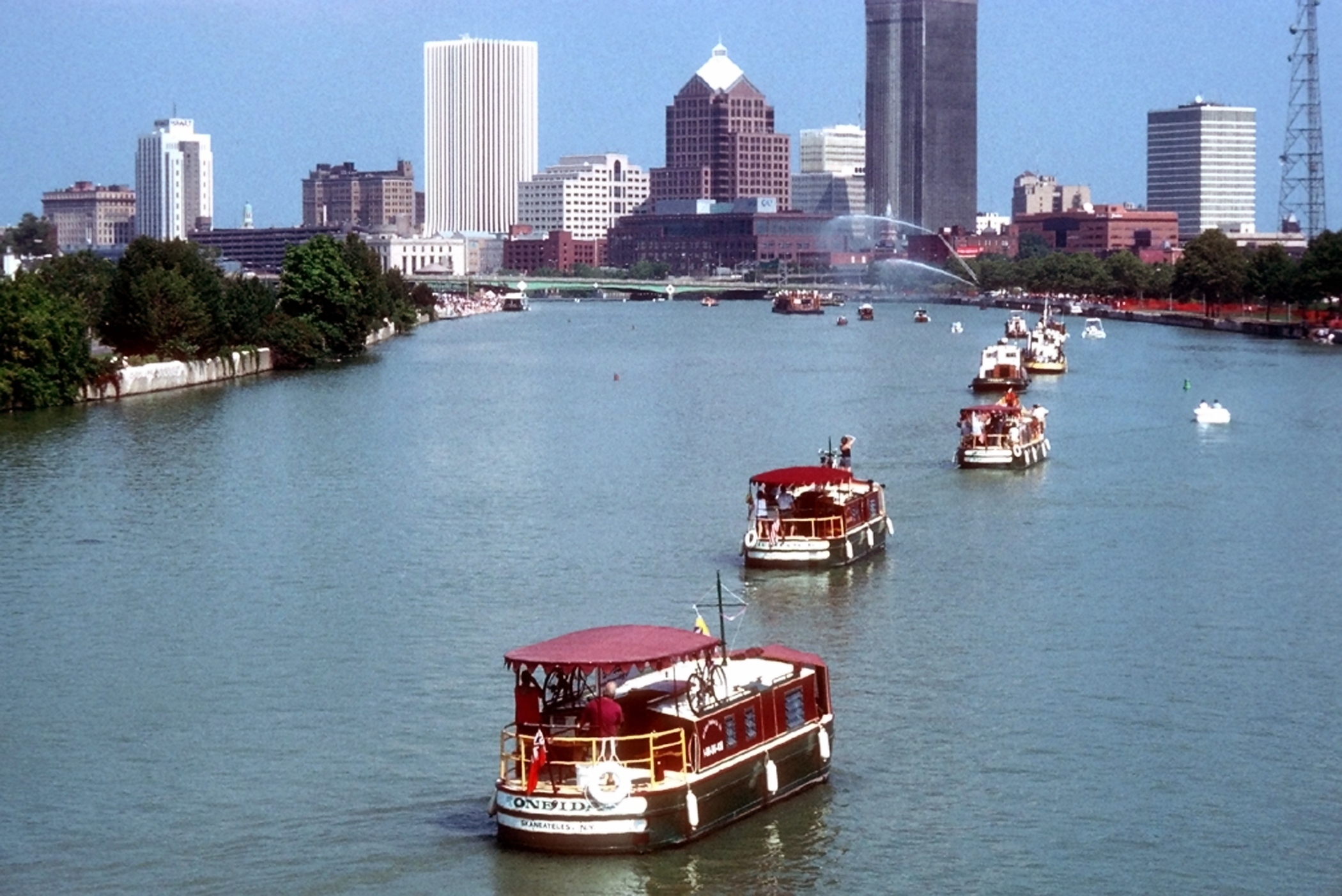
Barges on the Genesee River in Rochester

Western New York is culturally a Great Lakes/Interior Northeastern area, with a dose of Appalachia in the Southern Tier, an overlapping region of the state. Buffalo appears to have similarities to other Great Lakes cities/areas, while having Northeastern proclivities. The similarities with Chicago and Milwaukee run the list from sharing a common industrial base traditionally built around steel and automobile manufacturing. The cities were both developed during the same period in American history, so the street patterns, architecture, and ethnic communities share a similar appearance. Linguistically, Western New York is part of the Inland North region of American English, which means it is subject to the Northern Cities vowel shift; a distinct variant of that accent, "Buffalo English", is heard in many parts of the region.

Finally, most Western New York sports fans support the Buffalo Bills and Buffalo Sabres. Team loyalties of sports fans in the rest of upstate New York are more divided. Most baseball fans support the Cleveland Guardians, New York Yankees and New York Mets, although the Toronto Blue Jays have seen an increase in support due to the influx of Canadians in the area - as well as the region's proximity to Toronto, the Blue Jays' increased on-field success in the mid-2010s, the affiliation with the longstanding minor league Buffalo Bisons, and the Blue Jays playing much of their 2020 and 2021 schedule in Buffalo. The Pittsburgh Pirates have some following in southwestern New York, and teams with national fanbases such as the Boston Red Sox and Chicago Cubs also have followings. The region has no clear favorite professional basketball franchise, with the Brooklyn Nets, Cleveland Cavaliers, New York Knicks and Toronto Raptors all claiming parts of the region as part of their regional broadcasting territories. (Western New York puts more emphasis on college basketball, where the "Big 4" Division I programs—Canisius, Niagara, St. Bonaventure and UB—all have strong followings and rivalries; while most attention has been centered around the men's college basketball teams, the recent success of UB and St. Bonaventure's women's teams has led to increased attention to women's basketball in the region. The college basketball scene once had enough clout to help drive Buffalo's NBA team, the 1970s-era Buffalo Braves, out of the city.) Syracuse University sports, being the closest major-conference school to the region, also has a sizable following in western New York, particularly in basketball. College football interest is minimal, with no team having a major following (not even UB, who has struggled to maintain its Division I football program despite modest success). For hockey, other than the Buffalo Sabres, the region is also home to a number of Toronto Maple Leafs, New York Rangers and Pittsburgh Penguins supporters.

== Food ==
=== Region-wide ===
"Friday night fish fry" is popular regionally, a holdover from when Catholics were forbidden to eat meat on Fridays. It is usually skinless cod although most restaurants in the area claim they use the higher quality haddock, and is frequently beer-battered, deep fried, and served with French fries and cole slaw. Numerous restaurants in Western New York have a Friday fish fry special. The fish fry retains particular popularity during Lent, when Catholics are still barred from eating meat on Friday.

Italian-American food is a specialty in western New York. Most towns in the region have pizzerias. The Texas hot, introduced by Greek immigrants in the 1920s, has a strong following in the region, and several hot dog stands offer the dish. Longstanding Texas hot stands include Ted's Hot Dogs in Buffalo (1927), Rigas Texas Hot in Wellsville (1921), and Johnny's Lunch in Jamestown (1936; the Colera family is also tied to several other Jamestown stands such as AJ Texas Hots, which launched in 1968, and Michael's, which operated from 1976 to 2021).

The region produces many agricultural products, including milk, maple syrup, apples, cherries, potatoes, sweet corn, strawberries, raspberries, peaches, and grapes. As with the rest of Upstate New York, dairy farming is an important part of the economy. New York State is a leading producer among the states of dairy, maple, and wine.

Pizza logs, consisting of a deep-fried egg roll with pizza filling, originated in and are still manufactured in Sanborn.

=== Buffalo area ===
Perhaps the best-known food specialty of Western New York, is Buffalo chicken wings (known locally as 'wings' or 'chicken wings'). The two most popular places to get wings are Duff's and the Anchor Bar, which have a strong local rivalry in Buffalo and both are expanding outside the city.

At the 1885 Erie County Fair (known as the Hamburg Fair) in Hamburg, New York, Frank and Charles Menches sold a ground beef sandwich, which is one of the earliest claims of the invention of the hamburger.

Beef on Weck is a sandwich consisting of sliced warm roast beef on a Kummelweck roll topped with caraway seeds and coarse salt. Au jus and horseradish are often added.

Butter lambs are a popular tradition in Buffalo during the Lenten season leading into Easter. The Broadway Market, a market in Buffalo, is famous for this product.

=== Rochester area ===
The Rochester area is known for the Garbage Plate. It was created and continues to be served by Nick Tahou Hots on West Main Street. The name "Garbage Plate" is trademarked by Nick Tahou's, but other Rochester restaurants serve the same or similar dish under other names, usually containing the word "plate". The Rochester Red Wings baseball team concessions at Frontier Field, for example, offer the "Home Plate".

A component of the garbage plate and many other local dishes is a topping known in Rochester as "hot sauce." The term in this context does not refer to a pepper sauce, but to a spiced sauce containing bits of meat.

Another food associated with the Rochester area is the "white hot", a hot dog with a slight variation of ingredients that appears without the distinctive pink color of most hot dogs; when ordering a hot dog in Rochester it is common to be asked to clarify whether it should be "red or white".

== Economy ==
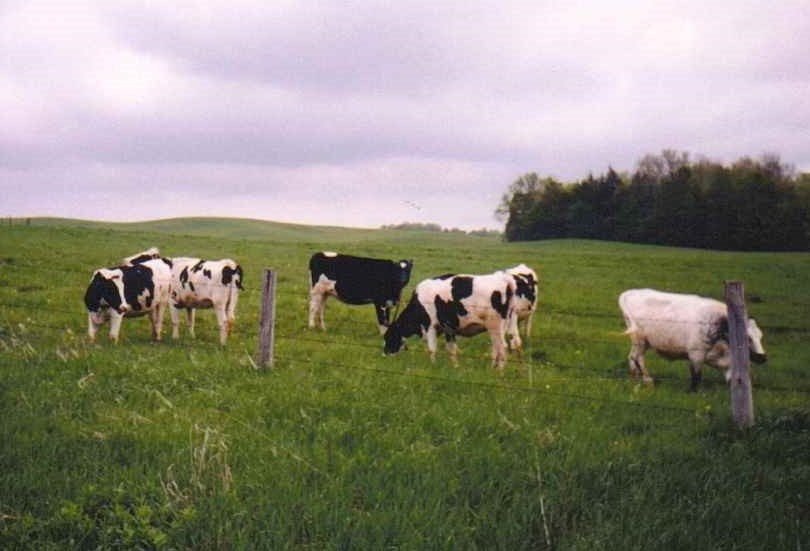
Dairy Cows, Collins Center, New York, (1999)

In urban areas in Western New York, education, business, light manufacturing and tourism have replaced heavy manufacturing which left the area at the end of World War II. Rochester and Buffalo were especially hard-hit with the exodus of manufacturing jobs to other areas of the United States and nations like China and Mexico. Niagara Falls was also hard-hit and has shed half of its population since its peak in 1960. Today, major corporations in Western New York include Kodak, Wegmans, Bausch & Lomb, Xerox, M&T Bank, KeyBank and Moog, among many others. General Motors continues to operate three facilities in the region. Rochester Components Operations, formerly known as Rochester Division, produces fuel system components. Lockport Operations, formerly Harrison Thermal Systems, produces cooling system components and was awarded $154 million for additional and future products in 2022. Finally, Tonawanda Power Train originally opened in 1938 as a Chevrolet engine plant and continues producing 4 and 8 cylinder engines in the Buffalo area.

Outside of the cities, agriculture has always been a major factor in the economy, especially dairy farming.

Ski country runs through Western New York. Glenwood and Ellicottville both have multiple ski resorts within their boundaries; Ellicottville, in particular, has seen massive gentrification from the development of the large ski resorts within the town boundaries and has attempted to build on that growth by branding itself as a year-round destination with numerous festivals. At their peak in the 1960s, over a dozen ski resorts were in Western New York, most of them in Cattaraugus County.

In Niagara County, viticulture, or wine culture, is also becoming a driver of the economy. In order to take advantage of this, the state has created the Niagara Wine Trail. To a certain extent, viticulture is also prominent in Chautauqua County, where Welch's has a long history; the western Finger Lakes also have a wine industry.

American Rock Salt, the largest operating salt mine in the United States, is located in Livingston County.

During the late 1990s, then-Governor George Pataki signed an agreement granting the Seneca Nation of Indians the right to acquire and build three full-scale casino gaming operations. The three casinos (Seneca Niagara Casino in Niagara Falls, Seneca Allegany Casino in Salamanca and the controversial Seneca Buffalo Creek Casino in Buffalo) are the only casinos that operate over all of Western New York as part of the agreement, for which the Senecas pay a portion of revenues to the state of New York (which, in turn, returns part of that money to the host municipalities). Twice over the course of the compact's history have the Senecas stopped paying their exclusivity payments: once in a dispute over whether video lottery terminals constituted the breach of the agreement, and again in 2017 after the Senecas claimed they are no longer required to pay the exclusivity payments but still maintain exclusivity under the language of the agreement.

The three native tribes in the region (Seneca Nation, Tonawanda Band and Tuscarora) also have a large influence in the convenience store sector. The tribes have long maintained that they are exempt from state excise taxes on gasoline and tobacco products, which allows native-owned convenience stores to provide lower prices than their non-native counterparts. Gasoline tax advantages were most pronounced in the 1990s, when low overall gas prices made the tax advantage far more noticeable. In the 1990s and 2000s, a mail-order tobacco industry thrived on Seneca reservations, an industry that has mostly been cut off since then. Increasing regulations now prohibit Senecas from receiving or selling name-brand cigarettes without taxes, sending tobacco products by mail (Prevent All Cigarette Trafficking Act) or private delivery, or accepting credit cards for remote purchases; the Senecas still sell native-produced tobacco products in brick-and-mortar stores on the reservations. Large tobacco farms can be seen in much of the Cattaraugus Reservation to meet the demand for native-grown, tax-exempt tobacco.

== Colleges and universities ==
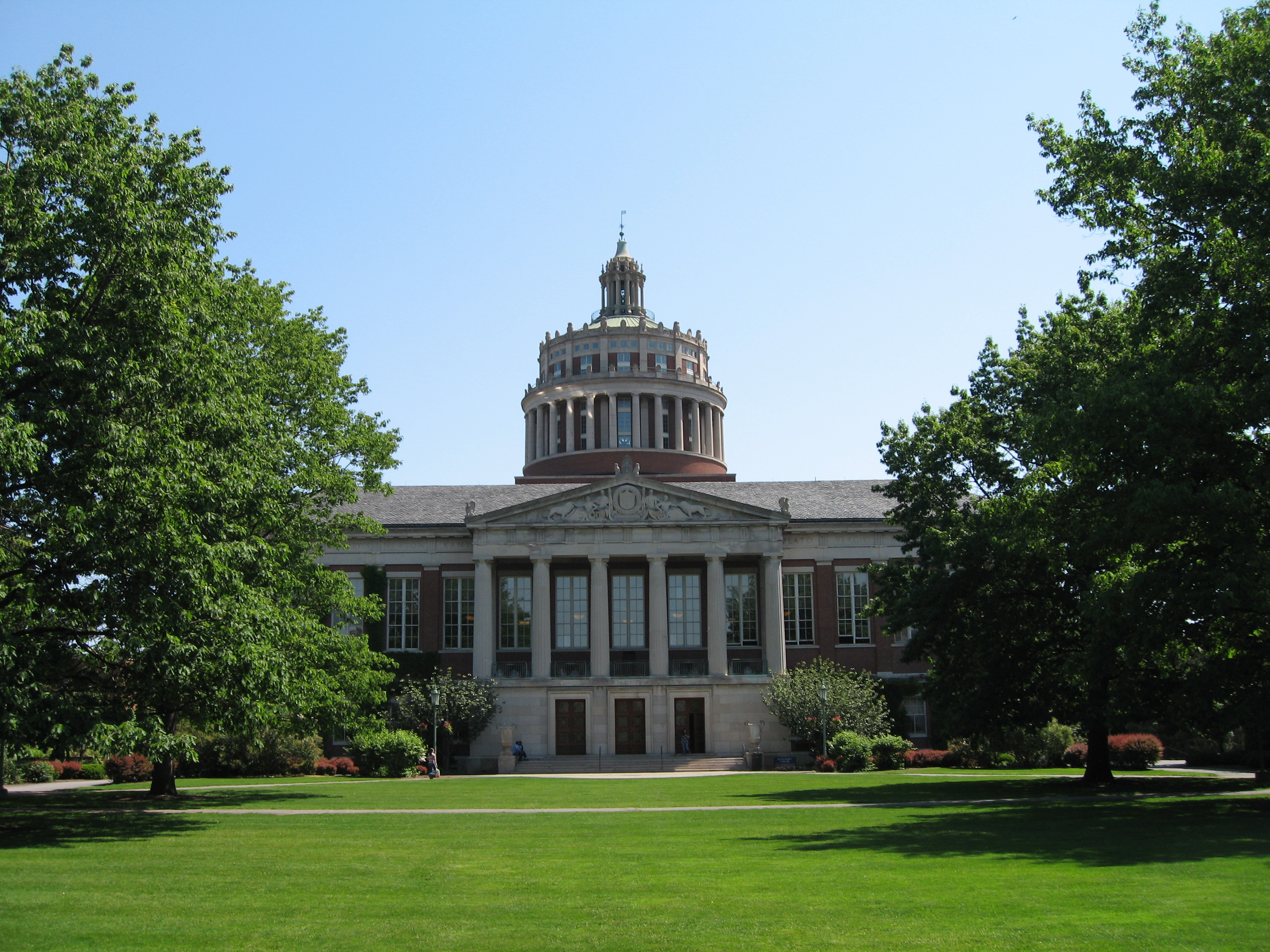
River Campus of the University of Rochester

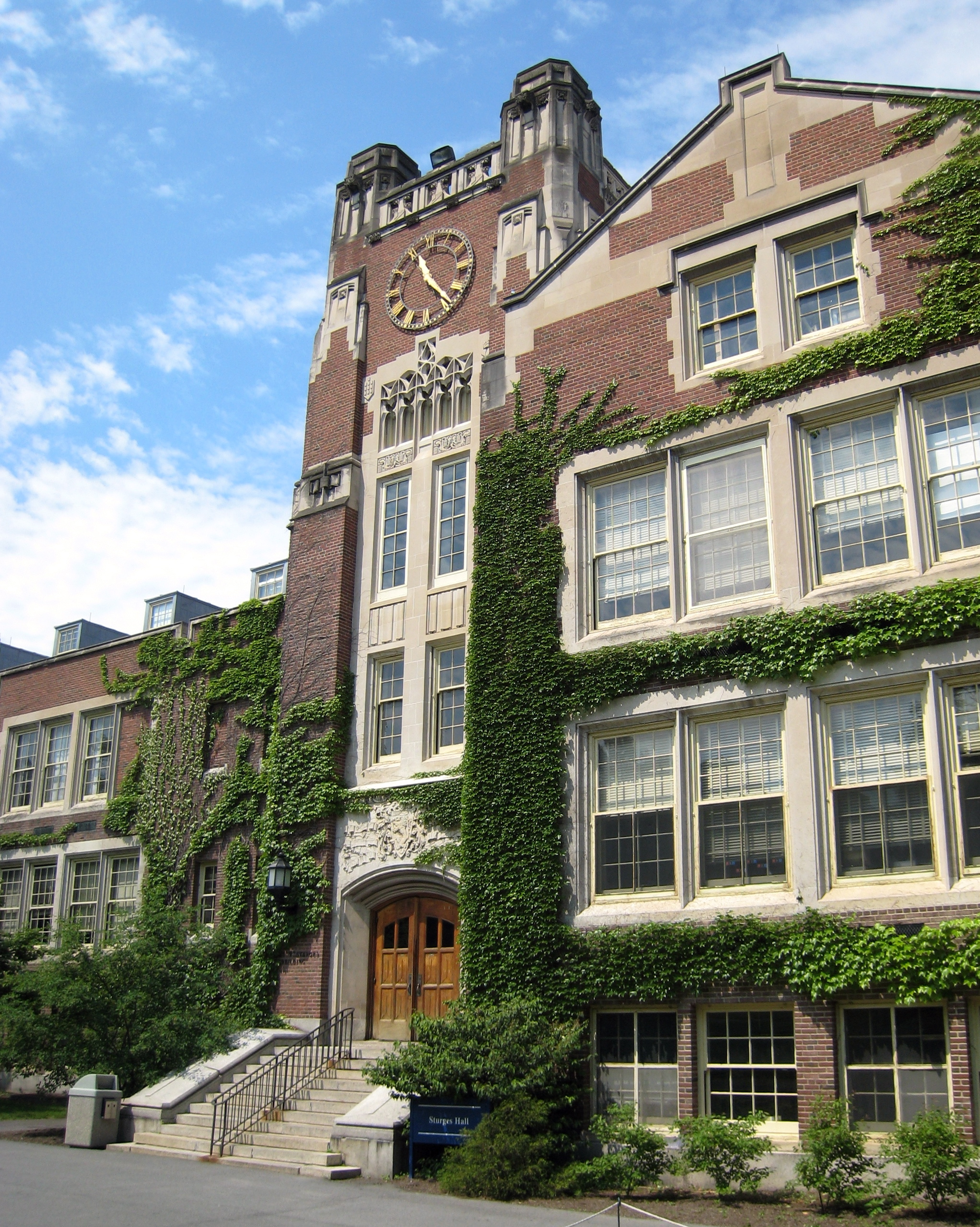
Sturges Hall is SUNY Geneseo's landmark building, featuring a clocktower and carillon

Name	County	Municipality
Alfred University	Allegany	Alfred
Arnot Ogden School of Nursing	Chemung	Elmira
Bryant & Stratton College	Erie	Buffalo
Buffalo State University (Not to be confused with University at Buffalo)	Erie	Buffalo
Canisius College	Erie	Buffalo
Colgate Rochester Crozer Divinity School	Monroe	Rochester
Corning Community College	Steuben	Corning
Cornplanter College	Cattaraugus	Salamanca
D'Youville University	Erie	Buffalo
Daemen University	Erie	Amherst
Eisenhower College	Seneca	Seneca Falls
Elmira College	Chemung	Elmira
Elmira Business Institute	Chemung	Elmira
Empire State University	Various (centers in Erie, Monroe)	Various (centers in Cheektowaga, Irondequoit)
Erie Community College	Erie	Three campuses located in Buffalo (city campus), Williamsville (north campus), and Orchard Park (south campus)
Finger Lakes Community College	Ontario	Hopewell
Genesee Community College	Genesee	Batavia
Hilbert College	Erie	Hamburg
Hobart and William Smith Colleges	Ontario	Geneva
Houghton University	Allegany	Houghton
Jamestown Business College	Chautauqua, Cattaraugus	Jamestown, Salamanca
Jamestown Community College	Chautauqua, Cattaraugus	Jamestown, Olean
Keuka College	Yates	Keuka Park
Monroe Community College	Monroe	Brighton
Nazareth College	Monroe	Pittsford
New York Chiropractic College	Seneca	Seneca Falls
Niagara University	Niagara	Lewiston
Roberts Wesleyan University	Monroe	Gates
Rochester Institute of Technology	Monroe	Henrietta
SUNY Alfred	Allegany	Alfred
SUNY Brockport	Monroe	Brockport
SUNY Fredonia	Chautauqua	Fredonia
SUNY Geneseo	Livingston	Geneseo
SUNY Niagara	Niagara	Sanborn
St. Bonaventure University	Cattaraugus	Allegany
St. John Fisher University	Monroe	Pittsford
St. Bernard's School of Theology and Ministry	Monroe	Pittsford
Trocaire College	Erie	Buffalo
University at Buffalo, SUNY	Erie	Amherst and Buffalo
University of Rochester	Monroe	Rochester
Villa Maria College	Erie	Cheektowaga

== Major businesses ==
Western New York is home to many small, medium and large corporations, including:

- Bausch & Lomb
- Buffalo Niagara Medical Campus
- Computer Task Group, Incorporated
- Cutco
- Delaware North Companies
- Ellicott Development Co.
- Fisher-Price
- Kaleida Health
- Kodak
- M&T Bank
- Merchants Insurance Group
- Moog Inc.
- New Era Cap Company
- Paychex
- Rich Products
- Sodexo
- Tops Markets
- Wegmans Food Markets
- Xerox

== Major attractions ==
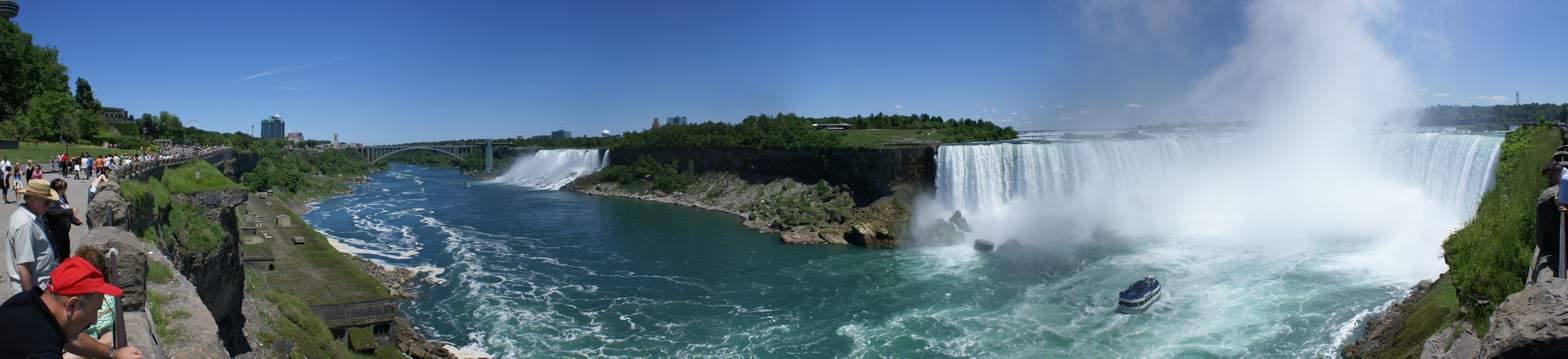
Panoramic view of Niagara Falls from the Canadian side

Niagara Falls forms part of Western New York's border with Canada. Letchworth State Park, located 35 miles south of Rochester, Letchworth State Park has been termed "The Grand Canyon of the East".

Allegany State Park in southern Cattaraugus County offers 65,000 acres of recreation space for camping, hiking, cabin rentals, swimming, snowmobiling and cross-country skiing. It is mostly surrounded by the Allegany Indian Reservation and to the south by the Allegheny National Forest.

Western New York is the home of the Chautauqua Institution near Jamestown, New York. Jamestown is also home to the Lucille Ball-Desi Arnaz Museum.

The Holland Land Office in Batavia, New York is a museum, with exhibits about the history of the company and the region.

Many towns along a nationally important historic site, the Erie Canal, have waterfront parks and bike trails.

The Genesee Country Village and Museum in Mumford, New York, is a living history museum. The George Eastman House in Rochester is the world's oldest photography museum.

The Theodore Roosevelt Inaugural National Historic Site, known locally as the Wilcox Mansion, is in Buffalo. It is the site of the first presidential inauguration of Theodore Roosevelt following the assassination of President William McKinley who had been attending the Pan-American Exposition in Buffalo in 1901.

Darien Lake, a theme park and concert venue in Genesee County.

== Sports ==
=== Major professional teams ===
Western New York is represented by two major league sports teams: the Buffalo Bills of the NFL and the Buffalo Sabres of the NHL. The Bills play their home football games at Highmark Stadium, the largest sports stadium in all of New York State, located just south of the city of Buffalo in Orchard Park. The Bills are the only team to reach the Super Bowl in four consecutive seasons (1990–1993) in NFL history.

The Buffalo Sabres also have a strong following in Western New York, and are consistently ranked among the highest-rated local TV hockey markets and the highest-rated markets for NBC/NBCSN regular season games. Primarily because of the strong regional interest in the team, in 2016 MSG Western New York was launched. The regional sports network is a sub-feed of the MSG Network, but is tilted towards Western New York sports and controlled by Pegula Sports and Entertainment. The Sabres reached the Stanley Cup Final in 1975 and 1999. The Toronto Maple Leafs and Ottawa Senators are the Sabres' biggest rivals. On January 1, 2008, the Sabres played the Pittsburgh Penguins in the inaugural Winter Classic at Ralph Wilson Stadium (now Highmark Stadium). This was the first ever regular-season NHL game held outdoors to be played in the United States.

Rochester is the 10th largest metropolitan area in the United States to not include a major professional team.

Western New York major league professional sports teams
Club	Sport	League	Venue
Buffalo Bills	Football	National Football League	Highmark Stadium
Buffalo Sabres	Ice hockey	National Hockey League	KeyBank Center

=== Minor professional teams and semi-professional teams ===
==== Baseball ====
Two Minor League Baseball teams play in Western New York: the Buffalo Bisons and Rochester Red Wings, both in the Triple-A International League North Division, and affiliates of the Toronto Blue Jays and Washington Nationals, respectively.

Collegiate summer baseball has an extensive presence in the area. The New York Collegiate Baseball League has several teams in Western New York (the Niagara Power, Wellsville Nitros, Alfred Thunder, Geneva Red Wings, Olean Oilers and Webster Yankees), as does the Perfect Game Collegiate Baseball League (the Jamestown Tarp Skunks and the formerly-professional Batavia Muckdogs).

==== Football ====
Western New York has several teams that participate in semi-professional and amateur football. The Northeastern Football Alliance hosts teams in Buffalo, Jamestown, Olean and Lyndonville; the Premier Amateur Football League operates a team in South Buffalo.

==== Hockey ====
The Buffalo Sabres minor league affiliate, the Rochester Americans, play in the American Hockey League.

==== Lacrosse ====
Lacrosse, the national sport of the native Iroquois, is popular in the region, with the Buffalo Bandits and Rochester Knighthawks both perennial contenders in the National Lacrosse League. From 2008 to 2017 lacrosse fans could also watch the Rochester Rattlers of Major League Lacrosse during the summer months or attend box lacrosse games in arenas on the Seneca reservations.

==== Soccer ====
Western New York currently does not have a team in Major League Soccer (occasionally considered the fifth major league on the American sporting landscape), although Rochester had been mentioned in the past as a candidate for a new expansion franchise and previously hosted the Rochester Lancers in MLS's predecessor, the NASL. The speculation of Rochester getting an MLS team was due to the relative success of the Rochester Rhinos. However, the Rhinos later a downturn in attendance due to a number of factors leading to the team going dormant in 2018 and re-emerging as Rochester, NY FC in a lower division of soccer in 2022. Such speculation has also decreased in the 21st century, in part because of MLS's refusal to put teams in metropolitan areas without any other major league teams and greatly increased competition for MLS expansion franchises. The former Rhinos franchise are best known as being the only non-MLS team to win the US Open Cup since that competition was opened to MLS teams.

Western New York was represented in National Women's Soccer League by the Western New York Flash, a team that originally began play in the W-league in 2008. The Flash, like the Rhinos, played its home games at Sahlen's Stadium in Rochester but were based out of suburban Buffalo. U.S. soccer star Abby Wambach was a member of the Flash. In 2017 the team transferred its NWSL rights to North Carolina and self-relegated to an amateur team. The Western New York region is home to FC Buffalo and the current incarnation of the Rochester Lancers, both of whom compete in the NPSL.

No indoor soccer teams currently play in the region. The region had previously been represented by the Buffalo Stallions, Buffalo Blizzard and another Rochester Lancers.

=== Other sports ===
==== Golf ====
Western New York is home to many different golf courses and country clubs including: Oak Hill Country Club, Grover Cleveland Golf Course, Niagara Falls Country Club, Hyde Park Golf Club, The Park Country Club, Beaver Island State Park Golf Course, and River Oak Golf Club, Locust Hill among others.

==== Motorsports ====
A number of Motorsports tracks operate in Western New York. The most prominent of these is Holland Speedway, a NASCAR-sanctioned track (currently hosting races in the Whelen All-American Series). Other, generally dirt, tracks include Stateline Speedway in Busti, Little Valley Speedway in Little Valley, Freedom Raceway in Freedom, Chapel Hill Raceway in Humphrey, Ransomville Speedway in Ransomville and Canandaigua Motorsports Park in Canandaigua. The last of these is the location in which NASCAR driver Tony Stewart was involved in a fatal accident with fellow racer Kevin Ward Jr. in 2014 during a sprint car race.

=== College and high school sports ===
College hockey also has a following, with Canisius College, Niagara University, and Rochester Institute of Technology competing at the Division I level and several other teams (including most of the SUNY schools) competing in Division III and/or the ACHA.

College basketball has several teams in the area. The four teams in Division I are known as the "Big 4" and include the Canisius Golden Griffins, Niagara Purple Eagles, UB Bulls, and St. Bonaventure Bonnies. Prior to UB's ascension to Division I, the three other schools—all Roman Catholic institutions—were known as the Little Three. In addition to the men's teams, the women's basketball teams of UB and St. Bonaventure have earned national success in the 2010s.

College football is much more sparse; only one team competes at the Division I Bowl Subdivision, the State University of New York at Buffalo's UB Bulls. Erie Community College fields a team in junior college football known as the Kats, while Buffalo State, Brockport State, The University of Rochester, St. John Fisher College, Alfred State and Alfred University field teams at the Division III level.

Greater Rochester is the largest metropolitan area in the United States to not include a college or university with a full NCAA Division I athletic program. Rochester Institute of Technology competes in Division I only in men's and women's ice hockey, and therefore cannot offer athletic scholarships.

Public high school athletic teams compete in sections 5 (Rochester area) and 6 (Buffalo area) of the New York State Public High School Athletic Association. Western New York Roman Catholic high schools compete in the Monsignor Martin Athletic Association.
