= Batavia (town), New York =

Batavia, New York
- Town
- Location in Genesee County and the state of New York.
- Coordinates: 43°00′04″N 78°13′34″W
- Country: United States
- State: New York
- County: Genesee
- Named for: Batavia, Netherlands

Government
  - Type: Town Council
  - Town Supervisor: Gregory H. Post
  - Town Council: Members' List: • Daniel Underhill; • Alfred Lang; • Patti Michalak; • John Gerace

Area
  - Total: 48.41 sq mi (125.37 km^{2})
  - Land: 48.19 sq mi (124.80 km^{2})
  - Water: 0.22 sq mi (0.57 km^{2})
- Elevation: 873 ft (266 m)

Population (2020)
  - Total: 6,293
  - Density: 130.6/sq mi (50.42/km^{2})
- Time zone: UTC-5 (Eastern (EST))
  - Summer (DST): UTC-4 (EDT)
- ZIP Codes: 14020–14021 (Batavia); 14005 (Alexander); 14036 (Corfu); 14056 (East Pembroke); 14125 (Oakfield)
- Area code: 585
- FIPS code: 3603704726
- GNIS feature ID: 978714
- Website: Town of Batavia

Batavia is a town in Genesee County, New York, United States. The population was 6,293 at the 2020 census. The name is derived from the Roman name for part of the Netherlands.

The Town of Batavia was formed in 1802 along with the county. Batavia is centrally located in the county. The City of Batavia is surrounded by the town, but not part of the town.

== History ==
The town was settled at the end of the 18th century. When Genesee County was created in 1802, it was created with one town: the Town of Batavia. At that time the county and its coterminous town encompassed most of western New York. The regional office of the Holland Land Company, the owner of all this territory, was located in the town, in the Village of Batavia, founded by Joseph Ellicott, the company's land agent. As other counties and towns were created, the territory of both the county and Town of Batavia shrank to its current size.

== Geography ==
According to the United States Census Bureau, the town has a total area of 48.4 square miles (125.4 km^{2}), of which 48.2 square miles (124.8 km^{2}) is land and 0.2 square mile (0.6 km^{2}) (0.45%) is water.

The Tonawanda Creek flows westward through the town, and the New York State Thruway (Interstate 90) passes across the town.

=== Adjacent towns and areas ===
To the north of the Town of Batavia are the Towns of Oakfield and Elba. The Town of Pembroke is on the west side, and the Town of Stafford is on the east side. The south border is shared by the Towns of Alexander and Bethany.

== Demographics ==
Historical population
| Census | Pop. | Note | %± |
|---|---|---|---|
| 1820 | 2,597 | | — |
| 1830 | 4,271 | | 64.5% |
| 1840 | 4,219 | | −1.2% |
| 1850 | 4,461 | | 5.7% |
| 1860 | 5,876 | | 31.7% |
| 1870 | 6,485 | | 10.4% |
| 1880 | 7,516 | | 15.9% |
| 1890 | 9,341 | | 24.3% |
| 1900 | 11,430 | | 22.4% |
| 1910 | 13,830 | | 21.0% |
| 1920 | 1,752 | | −87.3% |
| 1930 | 2,248 | | 28.3% |
| 1940 | 2,261 | | 0.6% |
| 1950 | 2,824 | | 24.9% |
| 1960 | 4,325 | | 53.2% |
| 1970 | 5,440 | | 25.8% |
| 1980 | 5,565 | | 2.3% |
| 1990 | 6,055 | | 8.8% |
| 2000 | 5,915 | | −2.3% |
| 2010 | 6,809 | | 15.1% |
| 2020 | 6,293 | | −7.6% |
U.S. Decennial Census

As of the census of 2000, there were 5,915 people, 2,334 households, and 1,645 families residing in the town. The population density was 122.1 inhabitants per square mile (47.1/km^{2}). There were 2,447 housing units at an average density of 50.5 per square mile (19.5/km^{2}). The racial makeup of the town was 96.80% White, 0.85% Black or African American, 0.39% Native American, 0.85% Asian, 0.03% Pacific Islander, 0.34% from other races, and 0.74% from two or more races. Hispanic or Latino of any race were 0.66% of the population.

There were 2,334 households, out of which 30.4% had children under the age of 18 living with them, 56.5% were married couples living together, 10.2% had a female householder with no husband present, and 29.5% were non-families. 23.7% of all households were made up of individuals, and 11.0% had someone living alone who was 65 years of age or older. The average household size was 2.53 and the average family size was 2.99.

In the town, the population was spread out, with 24.4% under the age of 18, 6.6% from 18 to 24, 29.0% from 25 to 44, 24.8% from 45 to 64, and 15.2% who were 65 years of age or older. The median age was 39 years. For every 100 females, there were 93.4 males. For every 100 females age 18 and over, there were 92.6 males.

The median income for a household in the town was $38,449, and the median income for a family was $43,425. Males had a median income of $32,098 versus $24,404 for females. The per capita income for the town was $19,563. About 7.3% of families and 9.6% of the population were below the poverty line, including 10.3% of those under age 18 and 9.6% of those age 65 or over.

== Communities and locations in the Town of Batavia ==
- Bushville – A hamlet west of the City of Batavia on Route 5, located on the Tonawanda Creek.
- Daws Corners (also called Daws) – A location at the intersection of Quaker Hill Road (Route 98) and Town line Road, north of the City of Batavia on the northern town line.
- East Pembroke – A part of this community is located at the west town line on Route 5.
- Five Corners ("Newkirk") – A hamlet on the Batavia-Elba town line in the northeast corner of the town.
- Genesee Community College – The two-year college is northeast of the City of Batavia.
- Genesee County Airport (GVQ) – A general aviation airport north of the City of Batavia. The airport also accommodates corporate and government aircraft.
- The Dirt Track at Genesee– An automobile racetrack
- Putnam Settlement – A location on the Batavia-Bethany town line.
- West Batavia – A hamlet in the southwest corner of the town on Route 33.

== Notable person ==
- David Buckel, LGBT rights lawyer

== See also ==
- Western New York
