= Bethany, New York =

- Town
- Location in Genesee County and the state of New York.
- Coordinates: 42°55′45″N 78°8′26″W
- Country: United States
- State: New York
- County: Genesee

Government
  - Type: Town Council
  - Town Supervisor: Carl Hyde Jr.
  - Town Council: Members' List: • William Gick; • Walter Wenhold; • Susan Z. Neer; • Edward Pietrzykowski

Area
  - Total: 36.07 sq mi (93.42 km^{2})
  - Land: 36.03 sq mi (93.33 km^{2})
  - Water: 0.035 sq mi (0.09 km^{2})
- Elevation: 1,180 ft (360 m)

Population (2010)
  - Total: 1,765
  - Estimate (2016): 1,731
  - Density: 48.0/sq mi (18.55/km^{2})
- Time zone: UTC-5 (Eastern (EST))
  - Summer (DST): UTC-4 (EDT)
- ZIP Codes: 14054 (East Bethany); 14005 (Alexander); 14020 (Batavia); 14143 (Stafford); 14525 (Pavilion)
- Area code: 585
- FIPS code: 36-037-06266
- GNIS feature ID: 0978729
- Website: Town of Bethany

Bethany is a town in Genesee County, New York, United States. The population was 1,765 at the 2010 census. The town lies on the southern border of Genesee County. US Route 20 and NYS Route 63 pass through the town.

== History ==
The area was first settled circa 1803. The town of Bethany was formed in 1812 from a partition of the town of Batavia.

== Geography ==
According to the United States Census Bureau, the town has a total area of 36.1 square miles (93 km^{2}), all land.

The southern town line is the border of Wyoming County.

Oatka Creek, a tributary of the Genesee River, flows northward through the town.

The town contains the Genesee County Park & Forest, the oldest county forest in New York State covering 431 acres.

== Demographics ==
Historical population
| Census | Pop. | Note | %± |
|---|---|---|---|
| 1820 | 1,691 | | — |
| 1830 | 2,374 | | 40.4% |
| 1840 | 2,286 | | −3.7% |
| 1850 | 1,904 | | −16.7% |
| 1860 | 1,897 | | −0.4% |
| 1870 | 1,652 | | −12.9% |
| 1880 | 1,671 | | 1.2% |
| 1890 | 1,517 | | −9.2% |
| 1900 | 1,330 | | −12.3% |
| 1910 | 1,270 | | −4.5% |
| 1920 | 1,196 | | −5.8% |
| 1930 | 1,254 | | 4.8% |
| 1940 | 1,231 | | −1.8% |
| 1950 | 1,410 | | 14.5% |
| 1960 | 1,569 | | 11.3% |
| 1970 | 1,978 | | 26.1% |
| 1980 | 1,876 | | −5.2% |
| 1990 | 1,808 | | −3.6% |
| 2000 | 1,760 | | −2.7% |
| 2010 | 1,765 | | 0.3% |
| 2016 (est.) | 1,731 | | −1.9% |
U.S. Decennial Census

As of the census of 2000, there were 1,760 people, 636 households, and 499 families residing in the town. The population density was 48.8 inhabitants per square mile (18.8/km^{2}). There were 665 housing units at an average density of 18.4 per square mile (7.1/km^{2}). The racial makeup of the town was 97.05% White, 0.80% African American, 0.23% Native American, 0.23% Asian, 0.17% from other races, and 1.53% from two or more races. Hispanic or Latino of any race were 0.40% of the population.

There were 636 households, out of which 34.9% had children under the age of 18 living with them, 65.7% were married couples living together, 8.6% had a female householder with no husband present, and 21.5% were non-families. 16.7% of all households were made up of individuals, and 5.0% had someone living alone who was 65 years of age or older. The average household size was 2.77 and the average family size was 3.10.

In the town, the population was spread out, with 25.5% under the age of 18, 8.7% from 18 to 24, 29.5% from 25 to 44, 25.2% from 45 to 64, and 11.0% who were 65 years of age or older. The median age was 38 years. For every 100 females there were 106.3 males. For every 100 females age 18 and over, there were 107.8 males.

The median income for a household in the town was $45,450, and the median income for a family was $50,234. Males had a median income of $32,113 versus $24,643 for females. The per capita income for the town was $18,693. About 3.2% of families and 5.1% of the population were below the poverty line, including 8.0% of those under age 18 and 3.1% of those age 65 or over.

== Communities and locations in Bethany ==
- Bethany Center – A hamlet at the intersection of Route 20 and Bethany Center Road. Holds location of the Government Center
- East Alexander – A hamlet on the west town line.
- East Bethany – This hamlet is the location of the former post office.
- Linden – A hamlet in the southwest corner of town.
- Little Canada – A hamlet northeast of East Bethany on Route 63, formerly called "Bennett's".
- Suicide Corners – A location on Route 20 and East Road in Bethany Center.
- Texaco Town – A location near the east town line at the intersection of Route 63 and Route 20.
- West Bethany – A hamlet on the west town line by the town of Alexander.
- Rolling Hills Asylum – A 19th century poor farm notable for being supposedly haunted, now a tourist attraction.
