= Alexander Classical School =

- U.S. National Register of Historic Places
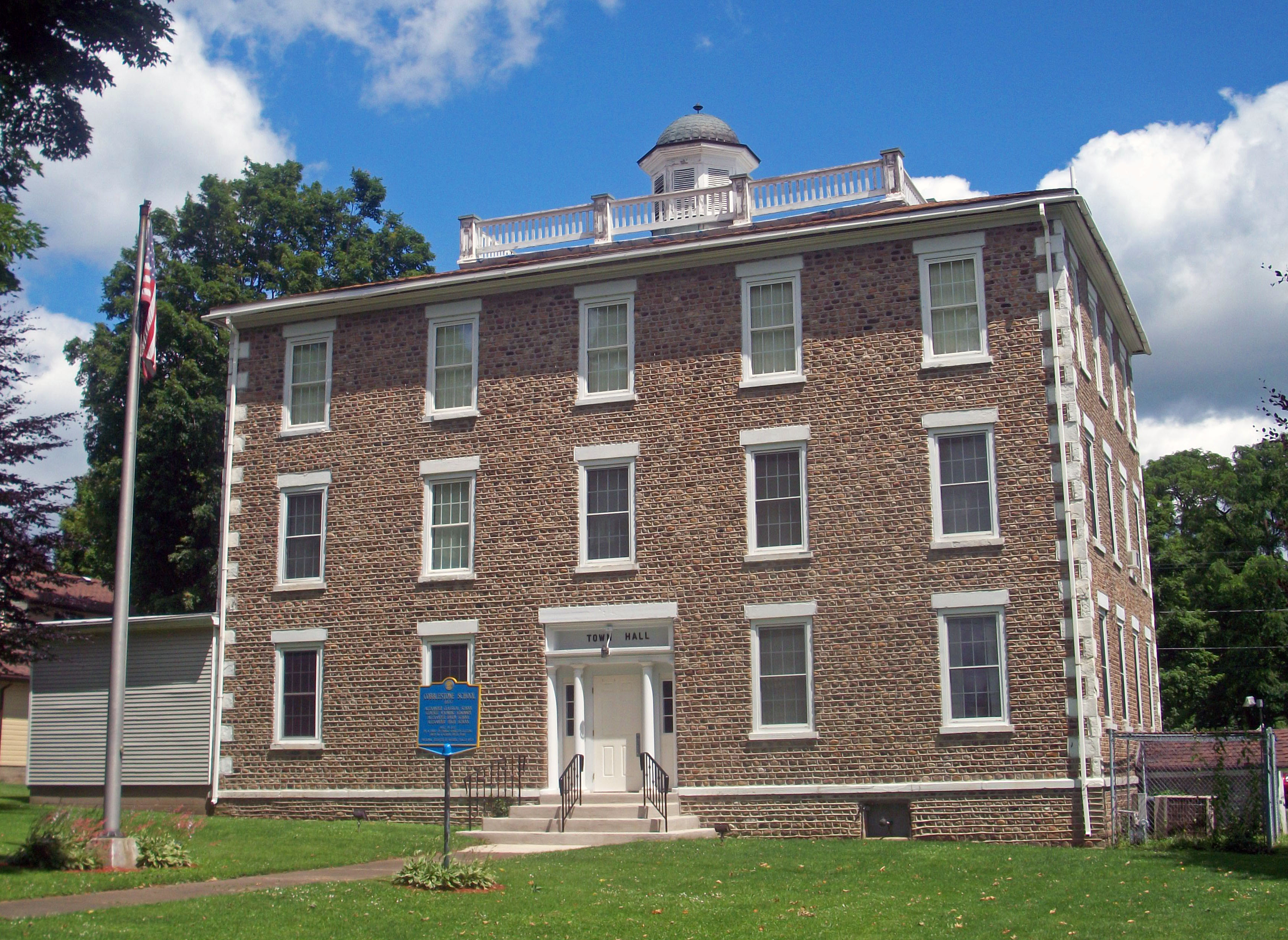
- South elevation and east profile, 2010

- Location within New York Location within the United States
- Location: Alexander, NY
- Nearest city: Batavia
- Coordinates: 42°54′8″N 78°15′34″W
- Built: 1837
- NRHP reference No.: 73001191
- Added to NRHP: October 25, 1973

The former Alexander Classical School, today Alexander Town Hall, is located on Buffalo Street in Alexander, New York, United States. It is a three-story cobblestone building erected in the 1830s.

It has a number of distinctions among cobblestone buildings, many of which are located in the region of New York south of Lake Ontario where the cobblestones used were sourced. It is one of the few to reach three stories high, and one of the few originally designed for educational purposes. It is the only one anywhere in North America currently used as a public building. The upper floor serves as a local history museum.

First home to a private school, it later became a public school building after the private school failed. When that ended, the building became the town hall. It was listed on the National Register of Historic Places in 1973, the southernmost listing in Genesee County and the only cobblestone building listed in the county.

== Building ==
The building is located on the north side of Buffalo Street, roughly a quarter-mile (500 m) east of where it forks south from U.S. Route 20, of which it was once part. Alexander Central School is just across the street; the other buildings in the area are residential. The land slopes down towards Tonawanda Creek to the east.

Tall mature trees along Buffalo Street provide shade. A narrow walk in the middle of the lawn goes the depth of the setback, equivalent to the distance to the rear wall of neighboring houses. In the rear, on Church Street, is a large parking lot for town officials and employees.

The building itself is a three-story five-by-four-bay structure faced in cobblestones 4–7 inches (10–18 cm) wide on the front set amid mortar. There are three rows of cobblestones per limestone quoin on the front and four per quoin on the end walls, where the stones are 2–2.5 inches (5.1–6.4 cm) wide. The windowsills, lintels and water table are also of limestone.

Atop the building is a hip roof. A balustrade surrounds the cupola, with a rounded roof and overhanging cornice. At the northeast corner a single brick chimney pierces the roof. A fire escape is on the north wall near a one-story wood frame addition, and a concrete block garage projects from the west wall.

Stone steps rise to the original main entrance in the center of the south facade (the town uses the rear of the building as the main entrance, and gives its address as 3350 Church Street). The paneled front door is slightly recessed. It is flanked by round smooth Doric columns and sidelights. A transom above has been filled in with wood and the words "Town Hall" written on it.

The door opens onto a central hallway with large meeting rooms used by both town and village on either side. The second story is given over almost completely to another large meeting room and the third floor used as a museum. Some original finishings, such as plaster ceilings, high wooden wainscoting and deep window frames, remain from its early 20th century use as a public school.

== History ==
In 1811 the first local library in the recently settled community of Alexander was established. A literary society that formed around it 17 years later, in 1828, began to seriously discuss starting a school focused on the classics, since they believed the local children didn't receive a broad enough education in the public schools. The $7,000 ($199,000 in contemporary dollars) cost was raised by subscription. A thousand of those dollars were contributed by State Senator Henry Hawkins, one of the leading businessmen of Alexander at the time.

Initially it was called the Alexander Classical School. In 1845, the mortgage was foreclosed. Hawkins donated it to the Genesee Presbyterian Church and the school renamed itself the Genesee and Wyoming Seminary. Later that year, upon his death, he bequeathed it his library and rock collection. By the middle of the century the school reached its peak enrollment of 300 students, many boarders, drawn from 14 states.

Many were from the South, and their absence contributed to the school's closure during the Civil War. In the decades afterward, the school evolved from a private to a public institution, a transition aided by new state laws making education compulsory. In 1886 it became Alexander's Union Free School, with a three-year high school program. The interior was remodeled for the new purposes, but the exterior remained untouched A 1908 fire in the boiler room did slight damage to the first floor; another one broke out in 1937.

The building continued to be the Union Free School until 1937, when voters in the area took advantage of another state law and consolidated the 18 small local districts in the area into what is now the Alexander Central School District. A newer, larger school was built across the road, and students and teachers moved there in 1938.

Two years later, in 1940, the Town of Alexander moved its offices into the vacant building. The interior was converted at that time to its present layout to accommodate governmental functions. In 1949 the garage was added for the fire department.

In 1958 the museum was opened on the third floor. It had been started by students across the street in the History Diggers club who had been collecting artifacts from their grandparents. They ran out of space in their classroom and asked the Town Board for help. Its collection eventually grew to include a Jenny Lind Bed, the possession of a local man who once played for her on her 1850 American tour, and an ostrich egg donated by a local man who traveled extensively and wanted local children to be able to see things from outside the area.

Six years later, in 1964, the fire department moved out of the building into its own facility. Major renovations in the mid-1990s shored up the building's structural system and remodeled the entire interior. The grounds were restored to their original layout and appearance.

== See also ==
- National Register of Historic Places listings in Genesee County, New York
