= Alvarus E. Gilbert =

American politician

Alvarus Eleazer Gilbert (August 17, 1825 – August 20, 1891) was an American farmer and politician.

Gilbert was born in Alexander, New York and went to the public schools. In 1839, he moved to Wisconsin Territory and settled in New Berlin. In the 1850s, Gilbert, his wife, and family moved to Illinois. In 1861, they returned to New Berlin and bought a farm. Gilbert served on the Waukesha County, Wisconsin Board of Supervisors. In 1878 and 1879, Gilbert served in the Wisconsin State Assembly and was a Republican. Gilbert was suffering from poor health and depression. He killed himself by hanging in a barn on his farm in New Berlin, Wisconsin.
