= Alexander, New York =

- Town
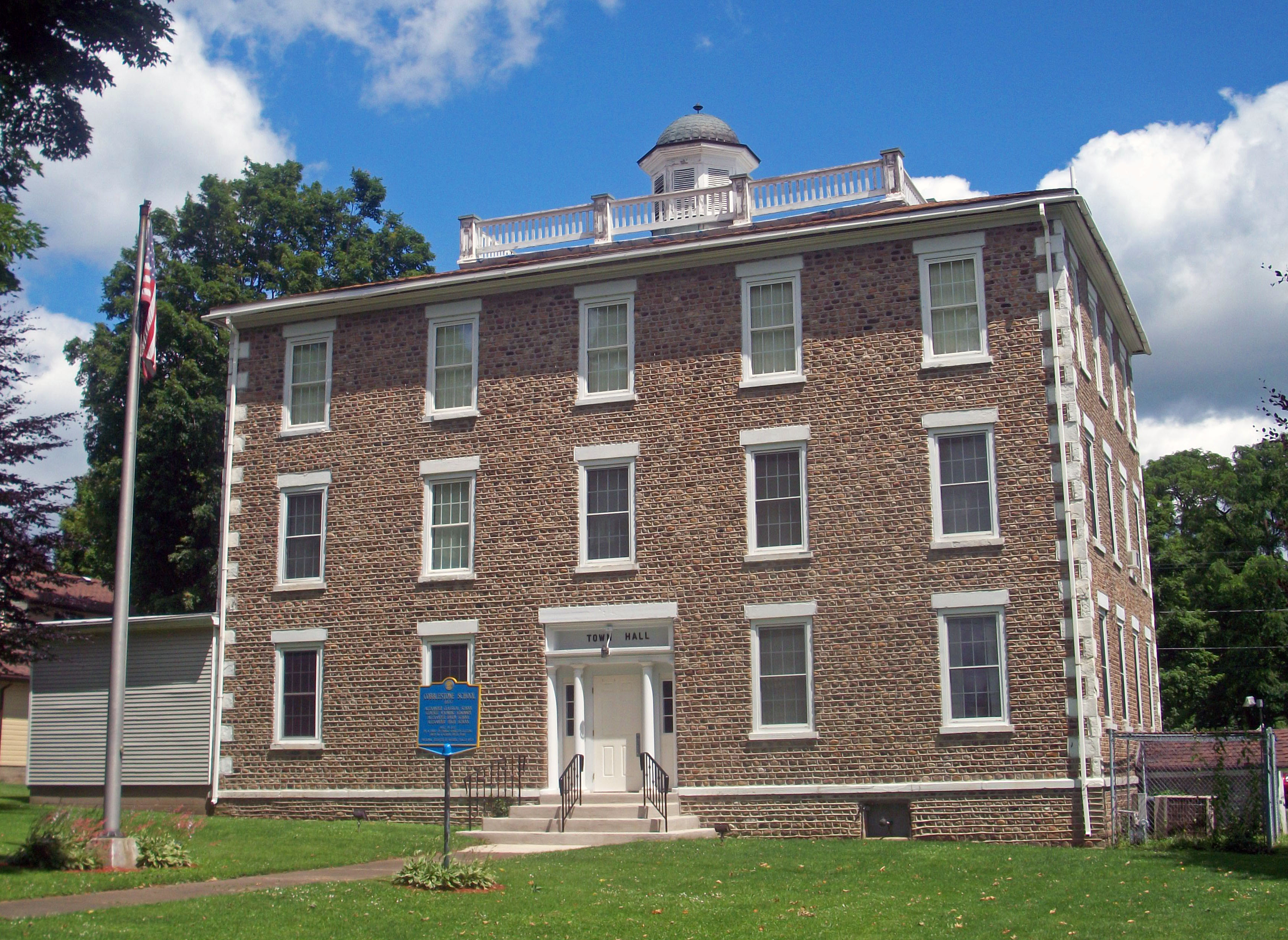
- Town hall, the former Alexander Classical School

- Location in Genesee County and the state of New York.

- Location of New York in the United States
- Coordinates: 42°54′06″N 78°15′23″W
- Country: United States
- State: New York
- County: Genesee County
- Incorporated: 1812
- Named after: Alexander Rea

Area
  - Total: 35.56 sq mi (92.11 km^{2})
  - Land: 35.47 sq mi (91.86 km^{2})
  - Water: 0.097 sq mi (0.25 km^{2})
- Elevation: 932 ft (284 m)

Population (2020)
  - Total: 2,491
  - Density: 70.23/sq mi (27.12/km^{2})
- Time zone: UTC-5 (EST)
  - Summer (DST): UTC-4 (EDT)
- ZIP Codes: 14005 (Alexander); 14011 (Attica); 14020 (Batavia); 14040 (Darien Center)
- Area code: 585
- FIPS code: 3603701165
- Website: townofalexanderny.gov

Alexander is a town in Genesee County, New York, United States. The population was 2,491 at the 2020 census. The town is named after Alexander Rea, an early settler, and is on the southern border of the county. It includes a village also named Alexander.

== History ==
Alexander Rea purchased 28.1 acres (11.4 ha) in the town in 1802 for $56.20 and founded the village of Alexander. The next year he laid out a road, now Walnut Street and Route 98, north of the settlement. The town of Alexander was incorporated in 1812, from a part of the town of Batavia.

The town includes the Alexander Classical School, listed on the National Register of Historic Places.

== Geography ==
According to the United States Census Bureau, the town has a total area of 35.5 square miles (92.0 km^{2}), of which 35.5 square miles (92.0 km^{2}) is land and 0.04 square mile (0.1 km^{2}, or 0.08%) is water. Tonawanda Creek, a tributary of the Niagara River, flows northward through the town.

The southern town line is the border of Wyoming County.

== Demographics ==
Historical population
Census	Pop.	Note	%±
1820	1,496		—
1830	2,331		55.8%
1840	2,242		−3.8%
1850	1,927		−14.0%
1860	1,801		−6.5%
1870	1,605		−10.9%
1880	1,608		0.2%
1890	1,587		−1.3%
1900	1,503		−5.3%
1910	1,362		−9.4%
1920	1,287		−5.5%
1930	1,378		7.1%
1940	1,423		3.3%
1950	1,591		11.8%
1960	1,987		24.9%
1970	2,351		18.3%
1980	2,367		0.7%
1990	2,233		−5.7%
2000	2,451		9.8%
2010	2,534		3.4%
2020	2,491		−1.7%
U.S. Decennial Census

As of the census of 2000, there were 2,451 people, 860 households, and 651 families residing in the town. The population density was 69.0 inhabitants per square mile (26.6/km^{2}). There were 893 housing units at an average density of 25.1 per square mile (9.7/km^{2}). The racial makeup of the town was 98.45% White, 0.29% Black or African American, 0.20% Native American, 0.33% Asian, 0.08% from other races, and 0.65% from two or more races. Hispanic or Latino of any race were 0.49% of the population.

There were 860 households, out of which 38.8% had children under the age of 18 living with them, 63.4% were married couples living together, 8.4% had a female householder with no husband present, and 24.2% were non-families. 19.4% of all households were made up of individuals, and 8.7% had someone living alone who was 65 years of age or older. The average household size was 2.85 and the average family size was 3.26.

In the town, the population was spread out, with 30.5% under the age of 18, 6.1% from 18 to 24, 31.4% from 25 to 44, 20.1% from 45 to 64, and 11.9% who were 65 years of age or older. The median age was 36 years. For every 100 females, there were 97.2 males. For every 100 females age 18 and over, there were 95.2 males.

The median income for a household in the town was $43,500, and the median income for a family was $51,364. Males had a median income of $37,553 versus $21,020 for females. The per capita income for the town was $20,031. About 5.0% of families and 6.9% of the population were below the poverty line, including 10.3% of those under age 18 and 3.9% of those age 65 or over.

== Communities and locations in the town of Alexander ==
- Alexander – The village of Alexander is in the south central part of the town.
- Attica – A part of the village of Attica is within the south town line.
- Brookville – A hamlet near the east town line.
- East Alexander – A hamlet located near the intersection of Brookville and West Bethany roads at the east town line.
- Little Tonawanda Creek – A stream that flows past Brookville, East Alexander, and West Bethany before joining Tonawanda Creek north of the town.
- North Alexander – A location north of Alexander village on the Alexander Road (Route 98).
- Ray – A hamlet in the northeast corner of the town.
- West Bethany – A community located east of Alexander Village on Bethany Road, at the town line with Bethany.

== Notable people ==
- Daniel Burling, former New York State assemblyman
- Barber Conable, former U.S. congressman and president of the World Bank
- Alvarus E. Gilbert, former Wisconsin State assemblyman
- Henry Hawkins (1790–1845), businessman, state assemblyman, founder of Alexander Classical School
- Horace E. Houghton (1835–1897), Washington and Wisconsin state legislator
- Al Keller, NASCAR and Champ Car driver
- Allen Manvel, eleventh president of the Atchison, Topeka and Santa Fe Railway
- John M. Stowell, former Wisconsin State assemblyman, mayor of Milwaukee
