= Freedom Motorsports Park =

Motorsport venue in Freedom, New York

- Location: Freedom, New York
- Coordinates: 42.4840°N 78.4344°W
- Owner: Bob Reis
- Operator: Cody Egner, General Manager
- Opened: 1983
- Former names: Freedom Raceway; Freedom Speedway; South Arcade Speedway
- Website: freedommotorsportspark.com

Oval
- Surface: Clay
- Length: .536 km (.333 miles)
- Turns: 4

Freedom Motorsports Park is a one-third mile dirt oval raceway located in the Chautauqua-Alleghany (or the western Southern Tier) Region of New York State. The facility includes two motocross tracks and an offroad ATV course was added in 2003.

== Overview ==
Freedom Raceway opened in May of 1983, but only operated a few seasons before shutting down. Dan Hoffman reopened the venue in 1989 and promoted the facility for nearly two decades until selling the property to sprint car driver Mike Lauterborn. Lauterborn also promoted the Genesee Speedway in Batavia, New York.

In 2015, the facility was purchased by modified driver Bob Reis, who rebranded it as Freedom Motorsports Park. Reis appointed his son-in-law Cody Egner as General Manager in 2024.

== Events ==
The speedway hosts events periodically during the racing season and feature the Super Late Models, RUSH Late Models, Big/Small Block Modifieds, UEMS E-Mods, All Star 410 Sprint Cars, and Empire Super Sprints.
