= Niagara Falls Country Club =

Country club

Coordinates: 43°9′46.8″N 79°2′12.2″W

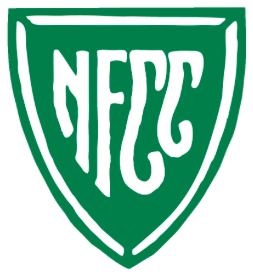
- Interactive map of Niagara Falls Country Club

Club information
- Location: Lewiston, New York
- Established: 1901
- Type: Private
- Tota holes: 18
- Tournaments: Porter Cup
- Website: https://www.niagarafallscc.com/
- Designed by: A.W. Tillinghast; Robert Trent Jones; Geoffrey Cornish; Brian M. Silva
- Par: 70
- Length: 6,871 yards (6,283 m)
- Course rating: 73
- Slope rating: 131

The Niagara Falls Country Club, located at 505 Mountain View Drive, is an exclusive country club and golf course located in the Lewiston Heights neighborhood of Lewiston, New York, just outside Niagara Falls, New York.

== History ==
The Niagara Falls Country Club was founded in 1901 in Niagara Falls at what is currently known as the Hyde Park Golf Club. The club was founded by Niagara Falls businessman Frank A. Dudley, who served as president for four terms. It moved to its current Lewiston location in Lewiston Heights neighborhood (which was founded and financed by Paul A. Schoellkopf and Dudley) in 1916 and is nestled atop the Niagara Escarpment. The course opened for play on June 1, 1919 and the head professional was Alfred "Alf" Campbell.

The club has panoramic views of the Towns of Lewiston and Porter (the latter includes the Village of Youngstown) as well as Niagara-on-the-Lake, St. Catharines and Toronto in Canada. The Niagara Falls Country Club has hosted the Porter Cup, originally known as the International Invitation at Niagara Falls Country Club, since its inception in 1959. Past champions of the Porter Cup include PGA Tour stars Phil Mickelson, David Duval, Scott Verplank and Ben Crenshaw.

As of December 2012, there were about 365 members in all categories.

== Golf course ==
The Niagara Falls Country Club course is a par 70, 6,621 yard, championship course that features 90 treacherous sand traps. It was originally designed by A.W. Tillinghast in 1919, and later updated by Robert Trent Jones Sr., Geoffrey Cornish, and Brian M. Silva. The course also features two large practice putting greens, driving range and chipping green.

The course has a rating of 73 with a slope of 131. In total, the par 70 course is 6,871 yards.

In 2011, the golf course at Niagara Falls Country Club was ranked #4 best private golf course in Western New York behind (1) Country Club of Buffalo, (2) Craig Burn, and (3) Park Country Club.

The course was described as a "tract of land is equal parts subtle roller and garishly-bunkered post modernist. Without equal are the greens; their subtle and obvious undulations are the match of any surfaces around, despite the location of many of them on flat, uninteresting ground."

== Tennis and pool ==
The tennis courts at the Niagara Falls Country Club feature four lighted Har-Tru tennis courts, a patio and a tennis hut. The courts have been referred to as the best Har-Tru courts in Western New York.

The Olympic-sized pool is located adjacent to the Clubhouse and also has a view of the Niagara Escarpment.
