= East Bethany, New York =

Hamlet in New York, United States

East Bethany is a hamlet located within Bethany, New York, United States in Genesee County. The community was the location of the Rolling Hills Asylum. East Bethany also contains the Bethany Post Office.

Rolling Hills Asylum, originally called the Genesee County Poor farm, was established in the winter of 1826. This location was formerly a stage coach tavern before the Genesee county board of supervisors bought the property and established the poor farm on December 4, 1826. A poor farm, or poor house, was an institution built by a government or charitable organization to house and maintain orphans, widowed women and their children, disabled people, the mentally ill, and minor criminals. The residents were called inmates. The poor farm was self-sufficient, and residents tended the farm and animals as part of their chores. There was a shop on location where jams and pastries were made; even a shop where coffins were made to sell for the individuals' own profit. There is a record of a cemetery on the grounds that has not yet been found.
