= Bob Reis =

American racing driver

- Nationality: American
- Born: December 12, 1968 (age 57) Elma, New York, U.S.

NASCAR Whelen Modified Tour career
- Debut season: 2024
- Years active: 2024
- Starts: 4
- Championships: 0
- Wins: 0
- Poles: 0
- Best finish: 38th in 2024
- Finished last season: 38th (2024)
- Statistics up to date as of April 16, 2025.

Robert Reis (born December 12, 1968) is an American professional stock car racing driver who last competed part-time in the NASCAR Whelen Modified Tour, driving the No. 10 for his own team. He is also the owner and track promoter of Freedom Motorsports Park.

Reis has previously competed in series such as the Race of Champions Asphalt Modified Tour, the International Supermodified Association, the SUNY Canton Sportsman, and the Patriot Sprint Tour.

== Motorsports results ==
=== NASCAR ===
(key) (Bold – Pole position awarded by qualifying time. Italics – Pole position earned by points standings or practice time. * – Most laps led.)

==== Whelen Modified Tour ====
NASCAR Whelen Modified Tour results
Year	Team	No.	Make	1	2	3	4	5	6	7	8	9	10	11	12	13	14	15	16	NWMTC	Pts	Ref
2024	Robert Reis	10	Chevy	NSM	RCH	THO	MON	RIV	SEE	NHA	MON	LMP; 18	THO	OSW; 19	RIV	MON; 20	THO; 22	NWS	MAR	38th	97	
