= Hyde Park Golf Club =

Golf course in Niagara Falls, New York

Coordinates: 43°06′17″N 79°00′56″W

Club information
- Location: Niagara Falls, New York
- Established: 1901
- Type: Public
- Tota holes: 18
- Tournaments: Hyde Park Club Championship
- Website: hydeparkgolfclub.org
- Designed by: William F. Gordon; David W. Gordon
- Length: 6,255 yards (5,720 m)

The Hyde Park Golf Club plays out of the Hyde Park Golf Course in Niagara Falls, NY. The Club was formed in 1938. The Golf Course was the original site of the 1901 Niagara Falls Country Club.

== History of Hyde Park Golf Course ==
The course on Sugar Street was founded as the Niagara Falls Country Club in 1901 by Niagara Falls businessman Frank A. Dudley, who served as president for four terms.

The original course was the nine-hole golf course known as the Red Nine today. By 1912, the golf club was considered prosperous and the initiation fee for a member at that time was an astounding $7.50 (equivalent to $250 in 2025) By the summer of 1916, after considerable growth, and in tune with changing demographics, the Country Club moved from Niagara Falls to its current Lewiston location in Lewiston Heights neighborhood. When the course opened for play on June 1, 1919, the head professional was Alfred "Alf" Campbell.

In 1938, the area was developed as Hyde Park and a brand new 18-hole facility along with the Red Nine was built for public play. The updated course was designed by Designed by William F. Gordon, ASGCA and David W. Gordon, ASGCA. The 18-hole Hyde Park course at the Hyde Park Municipal Golf Course facility in Niagara Falls, New York features 6,255 yards of golf from the longest tees for a par of 70. The course rating is 70.3 and it has a slope rating of 106.

In the late 1980s, a second club was formed due to growth in the market, named The Cataract Golf Club. Both clubs offered similar benefits to their members and maintained a friendly rivalry for over 15 years. Unfortunately once the explosion in golf waned, neither club could sustain its membership on its own and the two clubs merged with the original Hyde Park Golf Club name being used. The locals often refer to the course as Niagara Falls National in reference to the excellent course conditions often compared to Augusta National. The club schedules over 20 tournaments per year including a Club Championship and hosts the City Championship as well. The club also sponsors a Junior program allowing those under 18 years of age a chance to play and compete against other Junior clubs throughout Western New York.

== Membership ==
Membership allows members to play in all club sponsored tournaments, which include scheduled Tee Time Tournaments, Weekend Anyday Tournaments, Match Play Tournament, Club Championship and any other tournament that may be offered by the club.

=== Course Record ===
Course record for tournament play: Walt Kudela, -9 (61) in 1999 City Championship. Course record for USGA Tournament Play.

== See also ==
- Niagara Falls Country Club
