= The Dirt Track at Genesee =

Oval raceway in Batavia, New York

- Location: Batavia, New York
- Coordinates: 42.9871°N 78.1468°W
- Owner: Genesee Valley Agricultural Society, Inc.
- Operator: James Gayton
- Broke ground: 1979
- Opened: 1983
- Former names: Genesee Speedway, Raceway 5, Genesee County Fairgrounds
- Website: www.thedirttrackatgenesee.com

Oval
- Surface: Clay
- Length: .6 km (0.37 mi)
- Turns: 4
- Banking: Semi-banked

The Dirt Track at Genesee, is a 0.267-mile (0.430 km) dirt oval raceway located in the Finger Lakes Region of New York State.

== Overview ==
In 1960, the Genesee Valley Agricultural Society moved its annual fair from what is now the Batavia Downs to its present location on East Main Street in Batavia, New York. Two decades later an oval track was added to the grounds, but it was not until 1983 that the first automobile race was organized.

Former driver Dave McCready promoted the racetrack from 1994 until 2006, when he turned it over to sprint car driver Mike Lauterborn. Jim Mazur began leasing the facility in 2011 and renamed it Raceway 5, which was changed back to the original Genesee Speedway in 2016 when Jim and Pam Johnson took the reins. Six years later, the Johnsons passed the torch to Kurt and Bonnie Stebbins, who promoted the track through three seasons.

In November 2024, the Genesee County Fair Board awarded James Gayton a three-year contract with options for extension. Gayton has rebranded the venue as “The Dirt Track at Genesee.”

== Events ==
The Dirt Track at Genesee features six divisions: Rush Late Models, Sportsman, Street Stocks, Mini Stocks, Novice Sportsman, and Bandits. Additionally, a limited 358 Modified mini-series will be introduced to the track's 2025 lineup.
