= Alexander (village), New York =

Alexander, New York
- Village
- Location in Genesee County and the state of New York.
- Coordinates: 42°54′8″N 78°15′30″W
- Country: United States
- State: New York
- County: Genesee
- Town: Alexander
- Named for: Alexander Rea

Area
  - Total: 0.44 sq mi (1.13 km^{2})
  - Land: 0.44 sq mi (1.13 km^{2})
  - Water: 0 sq mi (0.00 km^{2})
- Elevation: 932 ft (284 m)

Population (2020)
  - Total: 518
  - Density: 1,184.7/sq mi (457.41/km^{2})
- Time zone: UTC-5 (Eastern (EST))
  - Summer (DST): UTC-4 (EDT)
- ZIP code: 14005
- Area code: 585
- FIPS code: 36-01154
- GNIS feature ID: 0942301
- Website: www.villageofalexander.com

Alexander is a village in Genesee County, New York, United States. The population was 509 at the 2010 census. The village is named after early settler, Alexander Rea.

The village of Alexander is within the town of Alexander. The village is in the south-central part of the town, south of Batavia.

Alexander is one of only twelve villages in New York still incorporated under a charter, the other villages having incorporated or re-incorporated under the provisions of Village Law.

== History ==
Alexander was part of the Phelps and Gorham Purchase of 1788. It was separated from nearby Batavia and was organized as a town on June 8, 1812. The town was named after Alexander Rea who purchased the first piece of land in 1802. The town was incorporated in April 1834.

== Geography ==
According to the United States Census Bureau, the village has a total area of 0.42 square miles (1.1 km^{2}), all land.

Tonawanda Creek flows to the northeast through the village. It eventually turns west and is a tributary of the Niagara River. Alexander is at the junction of Alexander Road (NY Route 98) and Broadway (US Route 20). NY 98 leads north 8 miles (13 km) to Batavia, the county seat, and south 3 miles (5 km) to Attica. US 20 leads east 26 miles (42 km) to Avon and west 22 miles (35 km) to Depew. Buffalo is 32 miles (51 km) to the west of Alexander.

== Notable person ==
- Barber Conable (1922–2003), U.S. congressman from Genesee County from 1965 to 1985 and president of the World Bank from 1986 to 1991

== Demographics ==
Historical population
Census	Pop.	Note	%±
1860	345		—
1880	305		—
1900	230		—
1910	212		−7.8%
1920	194		−8.5%
1930	212		9.3%
1940	265		25.0%
1950	304		14.7%
1960	335		10.2%
1970	474		41.5%
1980	483		1.9%
1990	445		−7.9%
2000	481		8.1%
2010	509		5.8%
2020	518		1.8%
U.S. Decennial Census

As of the census of 2000, there were 481 people, 172 households, and 121 families residing in the village. The population density was 1,099.4 inhabitants per square mile (424.5/km^{2}). There were 178 housing units at an average density of 406.8 per square mile (157.1/km^{2}). The racial makeup of the village was 98.34% White, 0.21% Native American, 0.83% Asian, and 0.62% from two or more races. Hispanic or Latino of any race were 0.42% of the population.

There were 172 households, out of which 41.3% had children under the age of 18 living with them, 58.1% were married couples living together, 5.8% had a female householder with no husband present, and 29.1% were non-families. 23.3% of all households were made up of individuals, and 10.5% had someone living alone who was 65 years of age or older. The average household size was 2.80 and the average family size was 3.30.

In the village, the population was spread out, with 33.3% under the age of 18, 6.9% from 18 to 24, 31.4% from 25 to 44, 17.5% from 45 to 64, and 11.0% who were 65 years of age or older. The median age was 33 years. For every 100 females, there were 106.4 males. For every 100 females age 18 and over, there were 98.1 males.

The median income for a household in the village was $51,528, and the median income for a family was $60,000. Males had a median income of $42,917 versus $21,071 for females. The per capita income for the village was $26,837. None of the families and 0.8% of the population were living below the poverty line, including no under eighteens and none of those over 64.

== See also ==
- Alexander, New York
