= Pennsylvania Route 957 =

State highway in Warren County, Pennsylvania, US

Pennsylvania Route 957

Route information
- Maintained by PennDOT
- Length: 25.044 mi (40.304 km)

Major junctions
- West end: US 6 in Columbus Township
- East end: US 62 in Elk Township

Location
- Country: United States
- State: Pennsylvania
- Counties: Warren

Highway system
- Pennsylvania State Route System; Interstate; US; State; Scenic; Legislative
| ← PA 956 | → PA 958 |

Pennsylvania Route 957 (PA 957) is a 25-mile-long (40 km) state highway located in Warren County, Pennsylvania. The western terminus is at U.S. Route 6 (US 6) in Columbus Township. The eastern terminus is at US 62 in Elk Township. The route has followed its current alignment since 1936.

== Route description ==
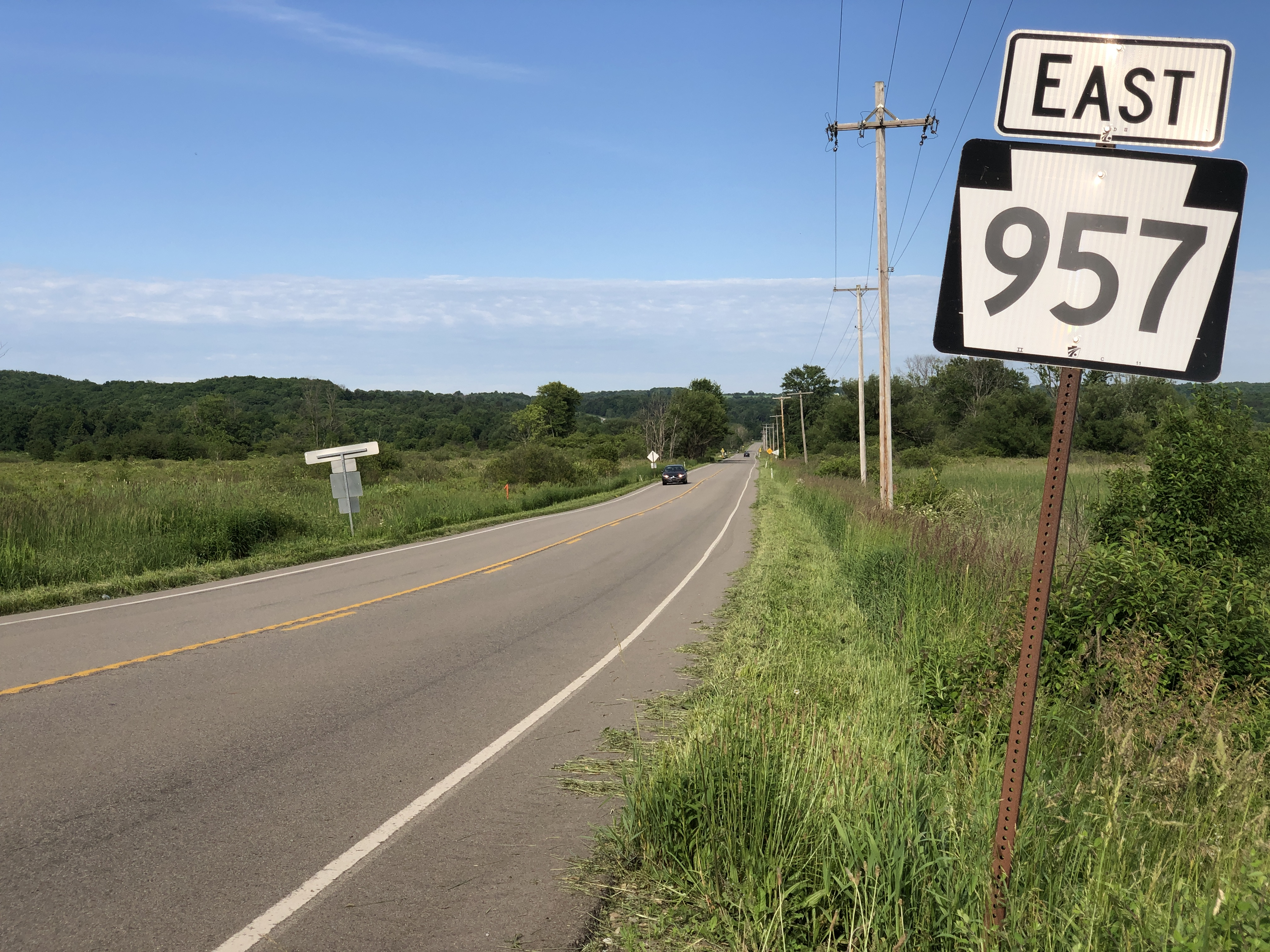
PA 957 eastbound in Columbus Township

PA 957 begins at an intersection with US 6 in Columbus Township, heading east-northeast on two-lane undivided Pike Road. The route runs through the residential community of Columbus before continuing east into agricultural areas with a few homes as an unnamed road. The road runs through Wilbur Crossing before continuing through rural areas and entering Freehold Township, where it passes through the community of Wells Corners. Farther east, PA 957 runs through areas of farms and woods before crossing a Western New York and Pennsylvania Railroad line and intersecting PA 958. At this point, PA 958 turns east to form a concurrency with PA 957 and the road passes more farms as it comes to the residential community of Lottsville. Here, PA 958 turns to the south and PA 957 continues northeast through more farmland and woodland with some homes.

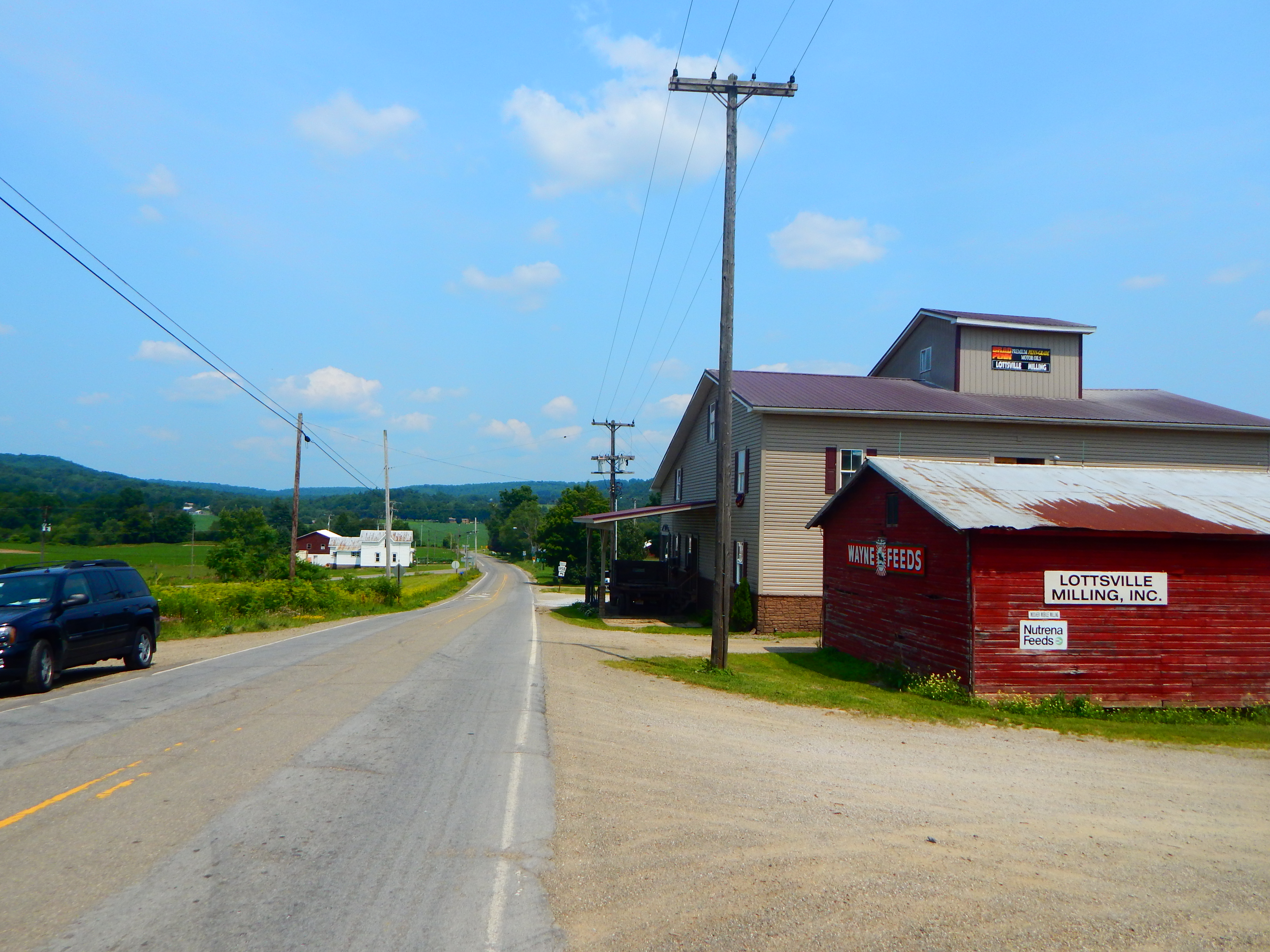
PA 957 east in Lottsville, approaching the junction with PA 958

The road heads into Sugar Grove Township and runs through Frodelius Corners before coming into the borough of Sugar Grove. The route becomes West Main Street and passes homes, reaching an intersection with PA 69. Here, PA 69 turns east for a concurrency with PA 957 and the road heads through the commercial downtown on Race Street, with PA 69 turning to the north. PA 957 continues past more residences before crossing back into Sugar Grove Township and running through areas of farms and woods with some homes, with the road name changing to Russell Lander Road. The route heads into Farmington Township and continues southeast through rural areas. The road heads into more open agricultural areas as it passes through the residential community of Lander before turning east and heading through Marshtown Corners. PA 957 enters Pine Grove Township and turns southeast, passing through more forested areas with some farms and homes. The route reaches its eastern terminus at an intersection with US 62.

== Major intersections ==
The entire route is in Warren County.

| Location | mi | km | Destinations | Notes |
|---|---|---|---|---|
| Columbus Township | 0.000 | 0.000 | US 6 (Grand Army of the Republic Highway) – Warren, Corry, Meadville | Western terminus |
| Freehold Township | 7.893 | 12.703 | PA 958 north – Panama | West end of PA 958 overlap |
| Freehold Township | 8.538 | 13.741 | PA 958 south – Wrightsville | East end of PA 958 overlap |
| Sugar Grove | 13.782 | 22.180 | PA 69 south (Mechanic Street) – North Warren | West end of PA 69 overlap |
| Sugar Grove | 13.856 | 22.299 | PA 69 north (Forest Street) – Chautauqua | East end of PA 69 overlap |
| Pine Grove Township | 25.044 | 40.304 | US 62 (Market Street Extension) – Jamestown, Warren | Eastern terminus |
1.000 mi = 1.609 km; 1.000 km = 0.621 mi: Concurrency terminus
