= Pennsylvania Route 69 =

State highway in Warren County, Pennsylvania, US

Pennsylvania Route 69
- Pennsylvania Route 69 highlighted in red

Route information
- Maintained by PennDOT
- Length: 14.313 mi (23.035 km)

Major junctions
- South end: US 62 in Conewango Township
- PA 27 in Sugar Grove Township; PA 957 in Sugar Grove
- North end: CR 69 at New York state line in Sugar Grove Township

Location
- Country: United States
- State: Pennsylvania
- Counties: Warren

Highway system
- Pennsylvania State Route System; Interstate; US; State; Scenic; Legislative
← PA 68	→ I-70

Pennsylvania Route 69 (PA 69) is a state highway in Warren County in the U.S. state of Pennsylvania. The state highway runs 14.313 miles (23.035 km) from U.S. Route 62 (US 62) in Conewango Township near Warren north to the New York state line in Sugar Grove Township, where the highway continues north as County Route 69 (CR 69) in Chautauqua County. PA 69 connects Warren, Sugar Grove, and the Chautauqua Lake area.

== Route description ==
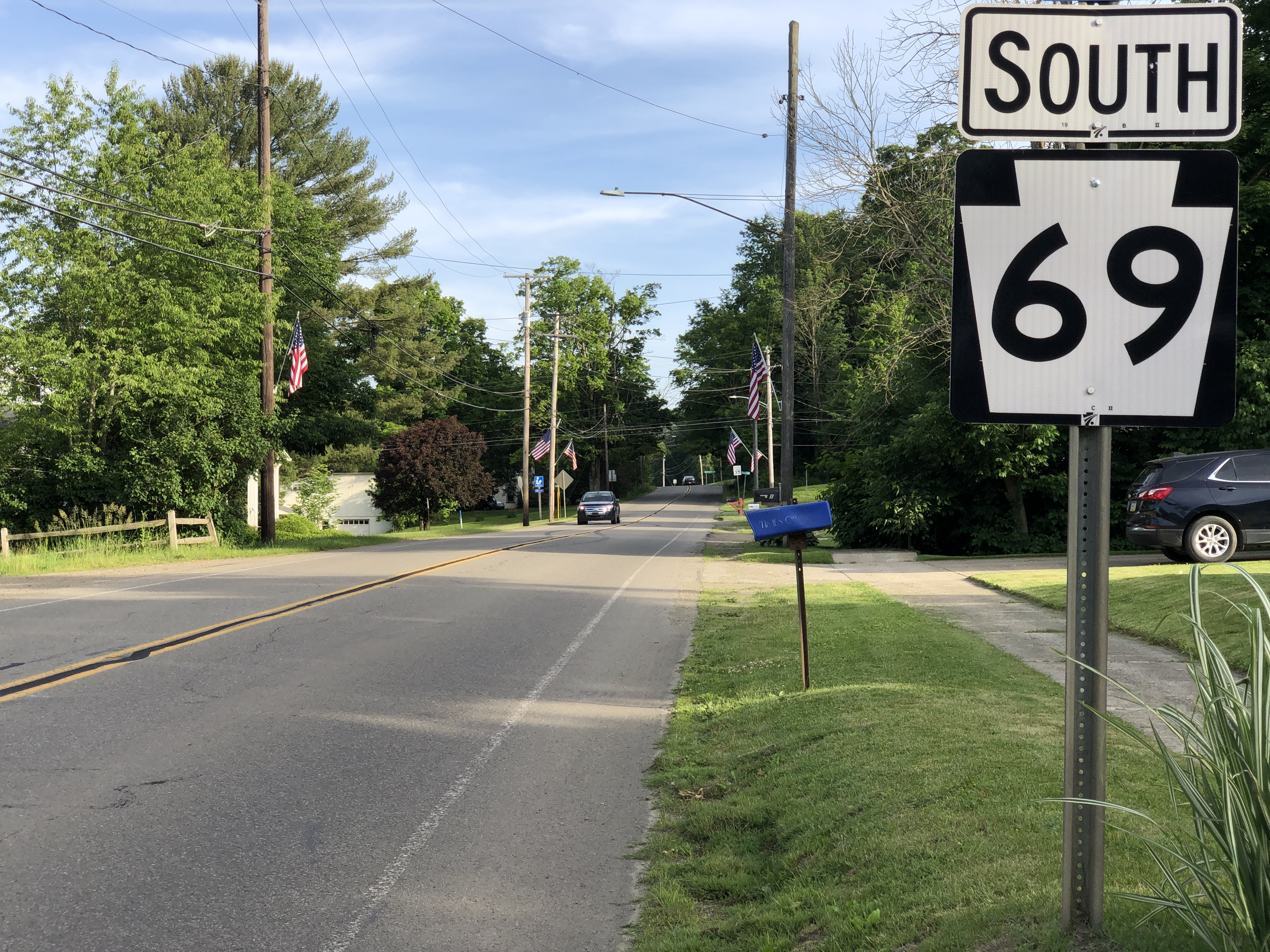
PA 69 southbound at PA 957 in Sugar Grove

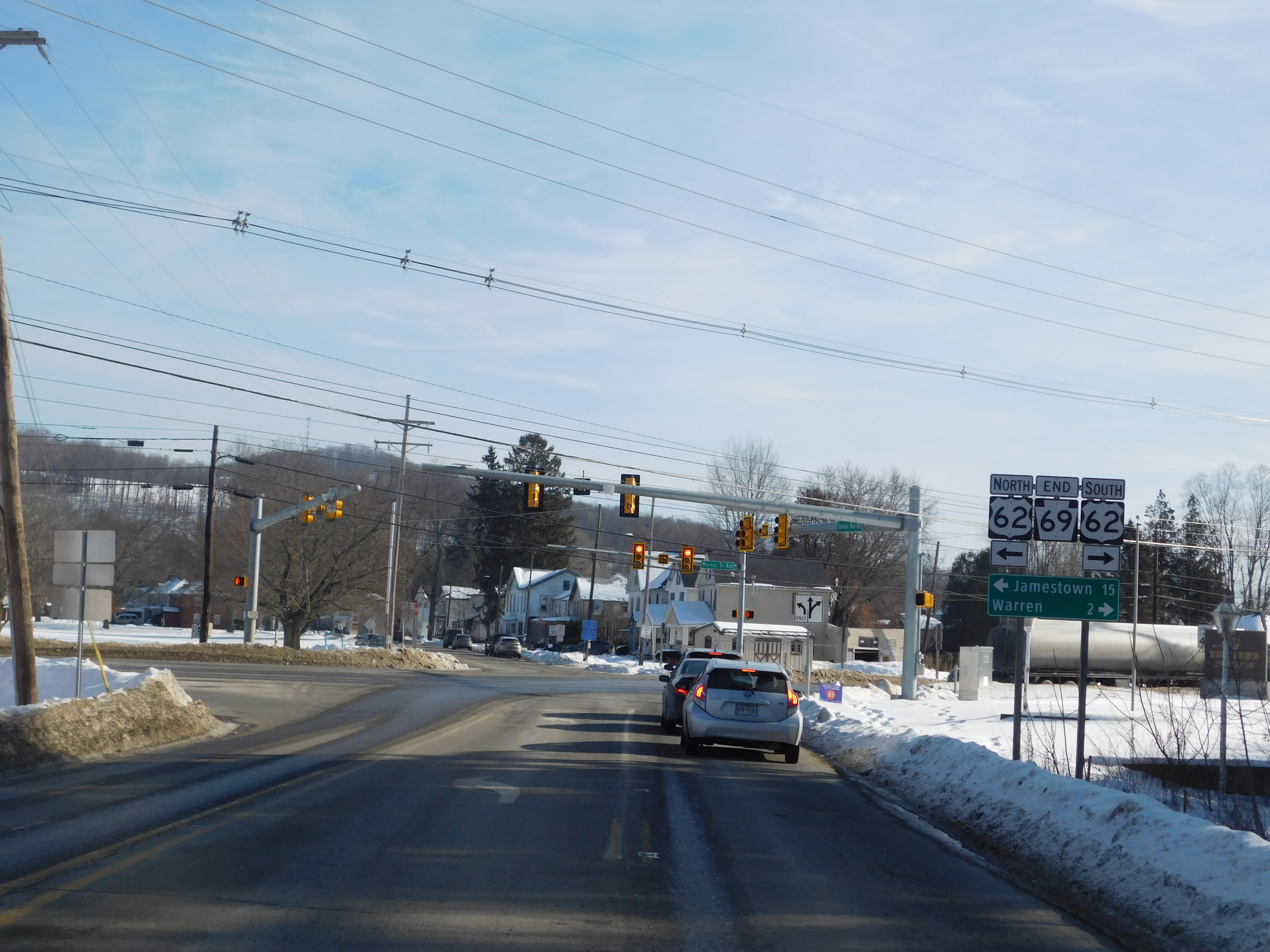
PA 69 southbound approaching its terminus at US 62 in North Warren

PA 69 begins at an intersection with US 62 (Market Street Extension) in the unincorporated community of North Warren in Conewango Township. The state highway heads northwest as Jackson Run Road, a two-lane highway passing through a forested area with scattered residences. PA 69 parallels Jackson Run, which empties into Conewango Creek, and crosses it a few times while passing through a narrow valley between Dutch Hill to the north and Yankee Bush Hill to the south. The state highway briefly passes through Farmington Township before entering Sugar Grove Township. PA 69 passes through the unincorporated community of Chandlers Valley and by a pair of ponds at the headwaters of Jackson Run before meeting the eastern terminus of PA 27 (Matthews Run Road). PA 69 continues north to the borough of Sugar Grove. The state highway intersects PA 957 (Main Street) and turns east to join the highway in a short concurrency to cross Stillwater Creek. PA 957 continues east as Race Street while PA 69 turns north onto Forest Street. Upon leaving the borough, PA 69's name changes to Big Tree Road for the short distance to the highway's northern terminus at the New York state line. The roadway continues north as CR 69 in Chautauqua County.

== Major intersections ==
The entire route is in Warren County.

Location	mi	km	Destinations	Notes
Conewango Township	0.000	0.000	US 62 (Market Street Extension) – Jamestown, Warren	Southern terminus
Sugar Grove Township	10.115	16.279	PA 27 west (Matthews Run Road) – Youngsville	
Sugar Grove	13.091	21.068	PA 957 west (Main Street) – Corry	South end of PA 957 concurrency
Sugar Grove	13.166	21.189	PA 957 east (Race Street) – Russell	North end of PA 957 concurrency
Sugar Grove Township	14.313	23.035	CR 69 north (Big Tree Road) – Chautauqua	New York state line; northern terminus
1.000 mi = 1.609 km; 1.000 km = 0.621 mi: Concurrency terminus
