= Pennsylvania Route 958 =

State highway in Warren County, Pennsylvania, US

Pennsylvania Route 958

Route information
- Maintained by PennDOT
- Length: 8.633 mi (13.893 km)
- Existed: 1928–present

Major junctions
- South end: US 6 in Pittsfield Township
- North end: CR 33 at the New York state line

Location
- Country: United States
- State: Pennsylvania
- Counties: Warren

Highway system
- Pennsylvania State Route System; Interstate; US; State; Scenic; Legislative
← PA 957	→ PA 959

Pennsylvania Route 958 (PA 958, also designated by the Pennsylvania Department of Transportation as SR 0958) is an 8.63-mile-long (13.89 km) state highway located in Warren County, Pennsylvania. The designation's southern terminus is at an intersection with U.S. Route 6 (US 6) in Pittsfield Township. The route heads through several small communities, including Lottsville, where it goes on a short concurrency with PA 957. The northern terminus is at the New York state line at Freehold Township, just east of Bear Lake. There, the route continues through New York as Chautauqua County Route 33 (CR 33). PA 958 was designated in 1928 as a connector from US 6 to the community of Wrightsville, where the designation terminated. The route was extended northward along its current alignment in 1936 and has remained unchanged since.

== Route description ==
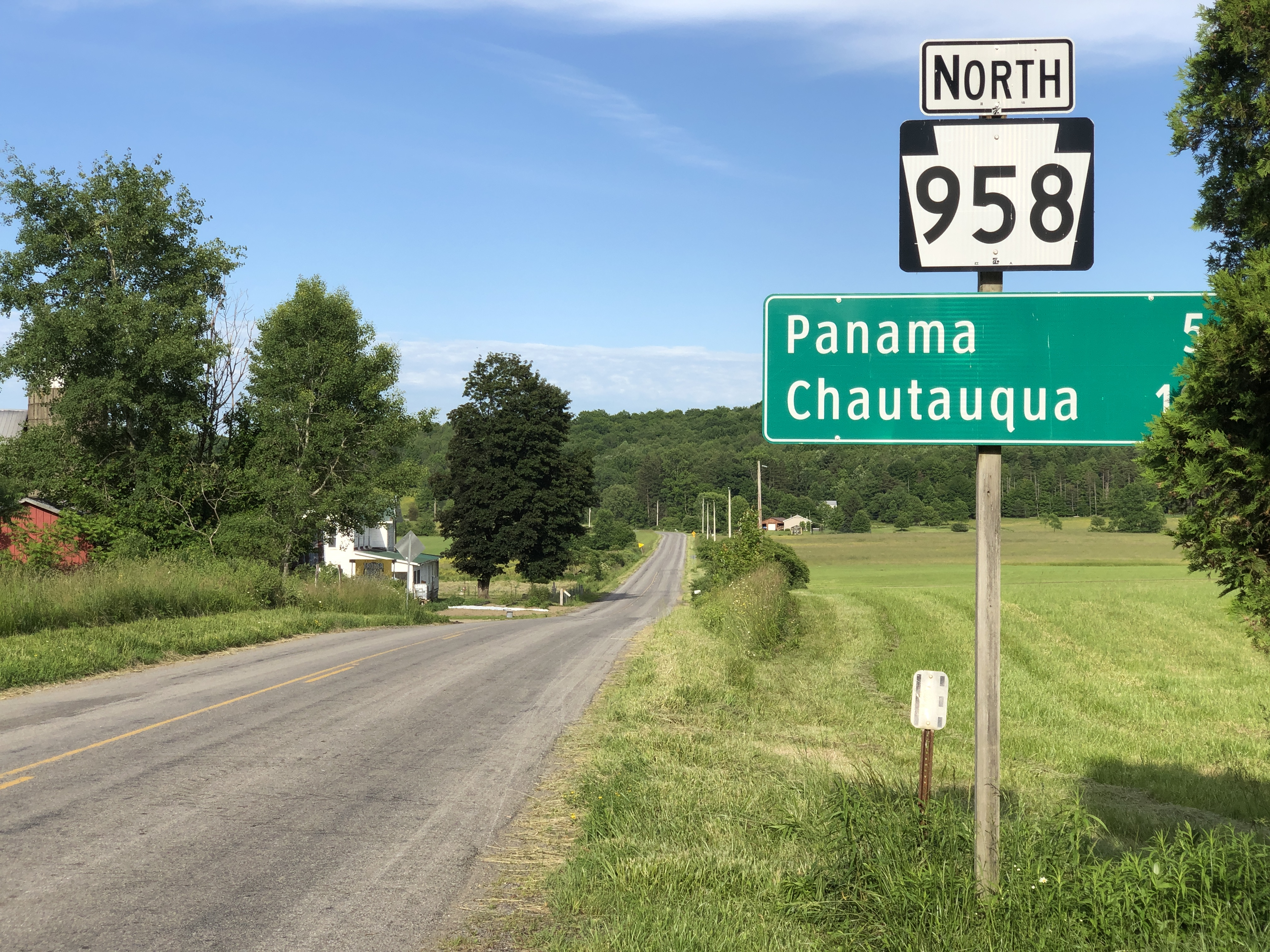
PA 958 northbound east of the borough of Bear Lake, next to the namesake lake

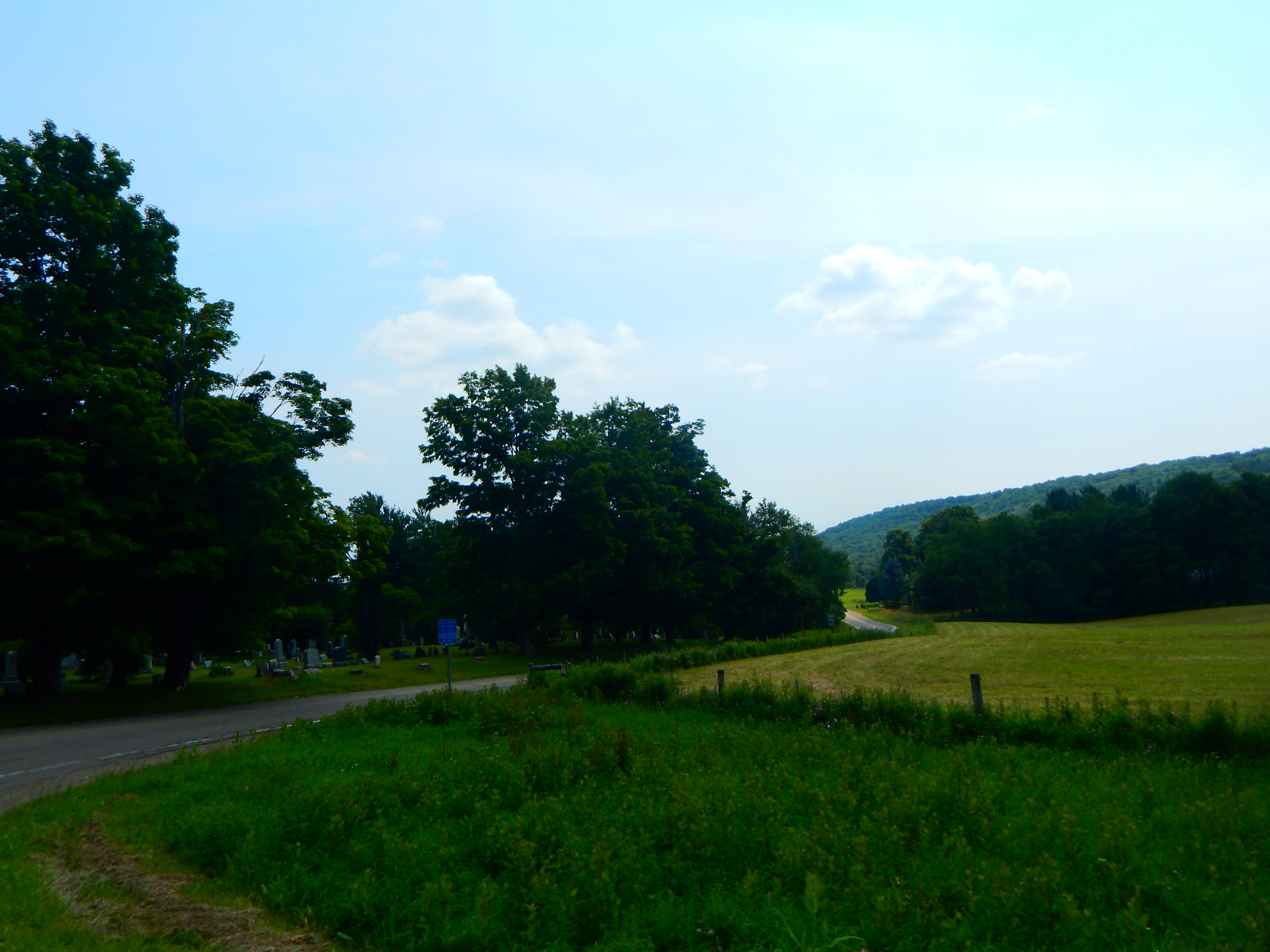
PA 958 south of Greeley Street in Freehold

PA 958 begins at an intersection with a two-lane US 6 east of the city of Corry. The route progresses northward as a two-lane roadway through the rural regions of western Pennsylvania. PA 958 soon enters the community of Wrightsville, a small community of a few residences and mostly fields. At Deadmans Run Road, the highway begins to cross through a populated area, however, it soon leaves Wrightsville and turns to the northwest in the deep fields north of the community. The northwestern bend curves back to the northward progression and PA 958 passes through a large farm near an intersection with Kidder Road. Some residences parallel the highway as it makes another northwestern bend and soon comes on a northward stretch into the community of Lottsville, where the highway intersects with PA 957.

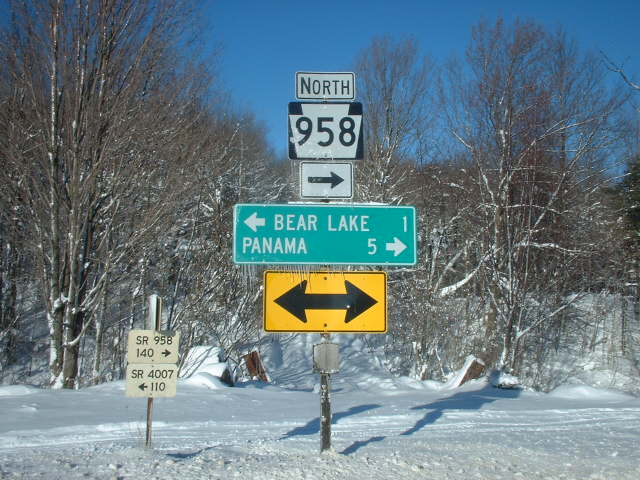
PA 958 at the intersection with Greeley Street in Freehold Township

At the intersection, PA 957 and PA 958 become concurrent along a westbound residential street, until leaving Lottsville, where the two routes turn to the southwest in fields. As PA 957 and PA 958 approach a railroad line used by the Western New York and Pennsylvania Railroad (and previously the Erie Railroad), PA 958 forks to the north, paralleling and soon crossing the rails northwest of Lottsville. The distinctively rural surroundings for PA 958 return, and the Norfolk Southern line parallels to the east as the highway curves northwestward. Soon, PA 958 returns to a farming region and curves away from the railroad on a mountainside. After passing a large pond, the route intersects Greeley Street a t-intersection in Bear Lake, where PA 958 turns eastward through the rural areas before intersecting with North Road, where the route turns northward and reaches the New York state line near Niobe, New York. PA 958 terminates here, and the right-of-way continues northward as Chautauqua CR 33 (Panama–Bear Lake Road).

== History ==
PA 958 was first designated among many regional highways in the 1928 mass renumbering of state highways throughout Pennsylvania. The alignment, however was only a stub designation, connecting the southern terminus of US 6 (formerly PA 7) to the community of Wrightsville, only a short distance away. The alignment designed in 1928 only remained intact eight years into 1936, when it was extended northward to its current terminus at the New York state line near Bear Lake, Pennsylvania and Niobe, New York in 1936. The alignment has remained unchanged since the 1936 extension.

== Major intersections ==
The entire route is in Warren County.

Location	mi	km	Destinations	Notes
Pittsfield Township	0.000	0.000	US 6 – Youngsville, Corry	Southern terminus
Freehold Township	3.580	5.761	PA 957 east – Sugar Grove	South end of PA 957 overlap
Freehold Township	4.225	6.799	PA 957 west – Corry	North end of PA 957 overlap
Freehold Township	8.633	13.893	CR 33 north (Panama-Bear Lake Road) – Panama	Continuation into New York
1.000 mi = 1.609 km; 1.000 km = 0.621 mi: Concurrency terminus
