= Akeley, Pennsylvania =

Unincorporated community in Pennsylvania, US

Coordinates: 41°57′53″N 79°07′51″W

Akeley is an unincorporated community in Pine Grove Township, Warren County, Pennsylvania, United States, located at an elevation of 1240 ft (378 m). The community is due north of the similar community of Russell, along the former routing of US 62. No population was counted during the 2010 census. The United States Postal Service operated a post office in Akeley, ZIP Code 16310, from 1878 until March 29, 1963, when the office was merged with Russell's.
