= Cynthia Catlin Miller =

American abolitionist (1791–1883)

- Born: 1791
- Died: 1883 (aged 91–92)
- Known for: Abolitionism

Cynthia Catlin Miller (1791–1883) was an American abolitionist active in the Underground Railroad in Pennsylvania, helping freedom seekers escape to Canada.

== Biography ==
Miller was an early settler of Sugar Grove, Warren County, Pennsylvania, near the New York state border. She was married to Richard Bishop Miller, a prosperous medical doctor and farmer, and had eight children. The entire family and many of their neighbors were abolitionists. Her daughter and son-in-law, Mary Miller McLain and the Rev. William W. McLain, ran the Monongahela House, Pittsburgh's first hotel and a haven for freedmen and abolitionists.

Miller organized Sugar Grove's Female Assisting Society and the Ladies Fugitive Aid Society, sewing clothes for freedom seekers and sheltering freedom seekers at the family home, a colonial farmhouse known as Miller Mansion and an important stop on the Underground Railroad. Miller hosted Frederick Douglass for tea at her home on June 18, 1854, ahead of a speech he gave at the Sugar Grove anti-slavery convention. She and her husband kept detailed diaries of their anti-slavery activities, writing candidly of sheltering freedom seekers and praising Uncle Tom's Cabin.

== Death and acknowledgement ==
Miller died in 1883 at the age of 91 and was buried at Cherry Hill Cemetery in Sugar Grove. In 2019, the Pennsylvania Historical and Museum Commission commemorated her activism with a roadside historical marker placed outside the Miller Mansion in Sugar Grove.
