= Lewis Clarke =

American former slave (1812–1897)

Lewis Garrard Clarke
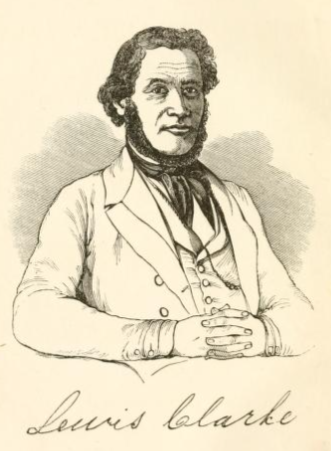
- Born: 1812 or 1815; Madison County, Kentucky
- Died: December 16, 1897; Lexington, Kentucky

Lewis Garrard Clarke was an ex-slave who published his experiences in his work, Narrative of the Sufferings of Lewis Clarke.

== Life ==
Lewis Clarke was born in Madison County, Kentucky, seven miles from Richmond, in 1812. Depending on the source, Clarke's birth year is listed as 1812 or 1815. He is best known for his slave narrative, Narrative of the Sufferings of Lewis Clarke, During a Captivity of More Than Twenty-Five Years, Among the Algerines of Kentucky, One of the So Called Christian States of North America, dictated by himself.

In the beginning of his narrative, Clarke expounds upon his slave and plantation-owning grandfather, Samuel Campbell. Campbell raped a female slave named Mary who, according to Clarke, was half white. They had one daughter, Letitia Campbell before Campbell married. Clarke's father, Daniel Clarke, was a Scottish weaver who came to America for the American Revolution. He had married once before but his wife died and left him two sons. He fought as a Minuteman at the Battle of Bunker Hill and remained active until the end of the war effort. Campbell promised Clarke's father that Letitia would be free in his will, and with this promise, Clarke's father married her around 1800.

Clarke's father died when Clarke was either 10 or 12 years old after receiving a devastating wound leaving him disabled, possibly paralyzed. Even when promised freedom, Letitia did not receive it and stayed enslaved as Clarke claims Campbell's heirs destroyed the will. During this time, Clarke fell into the hands of his grandfather's children, being the property of William and Betsy Benson, who treated him brutally. After Clarke learned he would be sold in New Orleans, Clarke fled to Ohio and across Lake Erie into Canada in 1841. On arriving in Canada:

When I stepped ashore here, I said, sure enough I am free. Good heaven! what a sensation, when it first visits the bosom of a full grown man — one, born to bondage — one, who had been taught from early infancy, that this was his inevitable lot for life.

He published Narrative of the Sufferings of Lewis Clarke in 1845, and in 1846 an extended edition which included the experiences of his brother Milton. He also traveled about giving lectures on his experiences as a slave. It was during one of these trips that he met Harriet Beecher Stowe, who was so impressed by Clarke and his story that she would base the character George Harris in her novel Uncle Tom's Cabin on Clarke.

While Clarke was not traveling, he lived in Warren County, Pennsylvania, before moving over the New York border to the town of Busti, New York. On 12 June 1849 he was married by Rev. L. P. Judson to Catherine Storum, but she died in April 1850. In the 1850 U.S. census he is listed living on the farm of William Storum, father of his recently deceased wife and also father-in-law of African-American abolitionist Jermain Wesley Loguen. After the end of the Civil War, Clarke returned South and died on December 16, 1897, in Lexington, Kentucky where he was a member of Historic St Paul AME Church. His body lay in state at the Lexington Opera House, then located on Main and Broadway in Lexington on order of Governor William Bradley, and he was subsequently buried in Westwood Cemetery in Oberlin, Ohio.

== Abolition lectures ==
1854 June 17–18 Sugar Grove Convention, Sugar Grove, Pennsylvania. Lewis Clarke, Rev. Jermain W. Loguen and Frederick Douglass

== Bibliography and external links ==
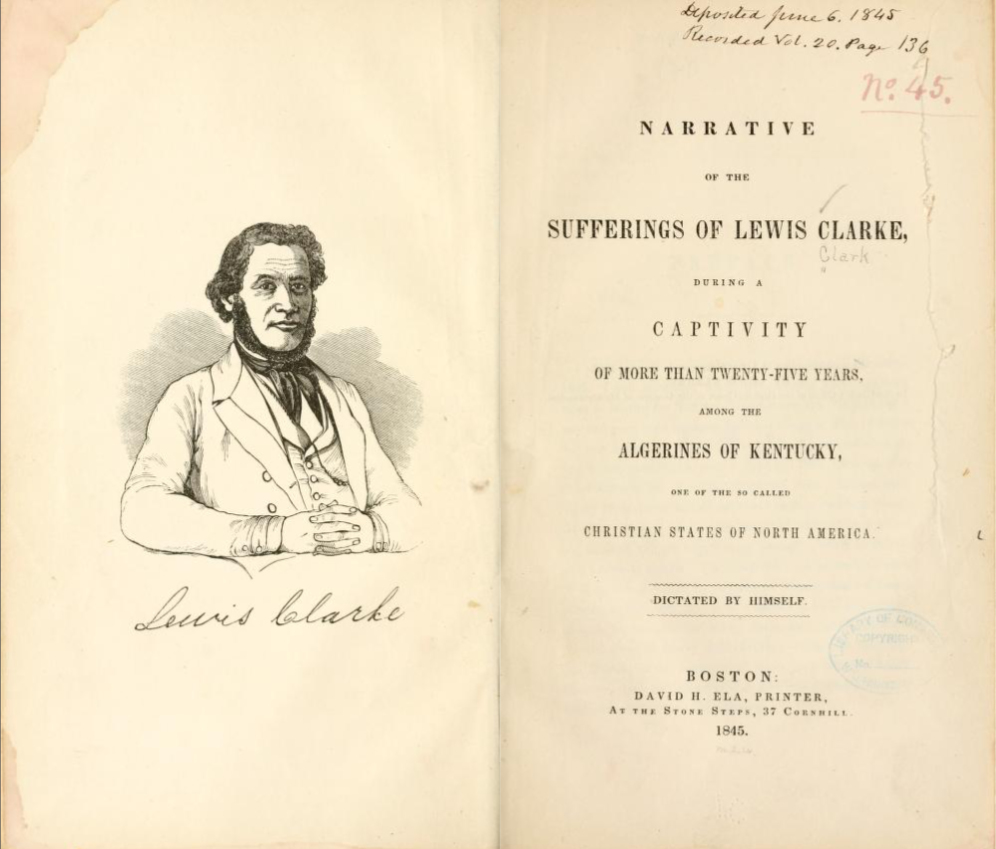
- Lewis Clarke 1845 Narrative
  Narrative of the Sufferings of Lewis Clarke, During a Captivity of More than Twenty-Five Years, Among the Algerines of Kentucky, One of the So Called Christian States of North America. Boston, 1845. See also Documents of the American South reference.
- Lewis Clarke. Narratives of the Sufferings of Lewis and Milton Clarke, Sons of a Soldier of the Revolution, During a Captivity of More than Twenty Years Among the Slaveholders of Kentucky, One of the So-Called Christian States of North America. Revised Edition, Boston, 1846. See also Documenting the American South reference.
- Lewis Clarke, introduction by Carver Clark Gayton. Narratives of The Sufferings Of Lewis Clarke During A Captivity Of More Than Twenty-five Years Among The Algerines Of Kentucky One Of The So Called Christian States Of North America, 2012.
- Carver Clark Gayton. When Owing a Shilling Costs a Dollar, The Saga of Lewis G. Clarke, Born a "White" Slave. 2014.
