= Elnora M. Babcock =

American suffragist (1852-1934)

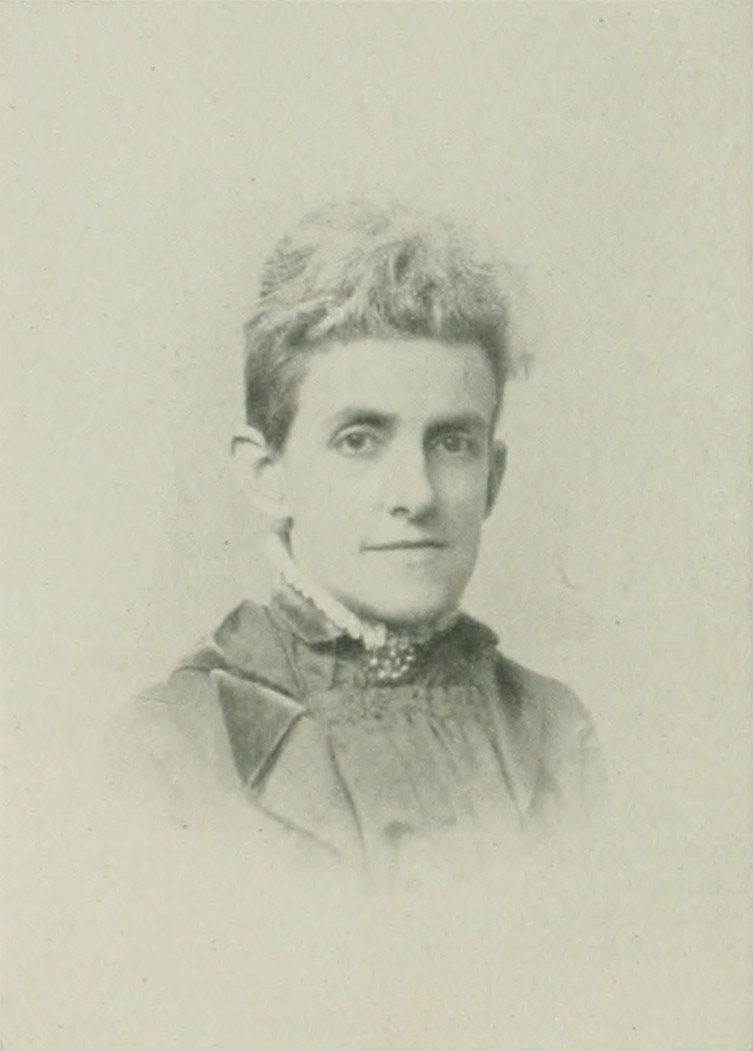
- Photo in A Woman of the Century
- Born: Elnora E. Monroe; January 11, 1852; Columbus, Pennsylvania, U.S.
- Died: December 29, 1934 (aged 82); Dunkirk, New York, U.S.
- Education: Jamestown High School, Lyons Musical Academ
- Occupation: Suffragist
- Spouse: John W. Babcock (m. 1870)
- Writing career
- Literary movement: Suffrage

Elnora E. Monroe Babcock (née Monroe; January 11, 1852 – December 29, 1934) was a pioneer leader in the American suffrage movement. She became actively interested in suffrage work in 1889 and for several years had charge of the press work for the National Woman Suffrage Association. She lived in Dunkirk, New York since 1880. Her name was inscribed on a bronze tablet in the New York State Capitol at Albany, with the names of other prominent suffragists.

== Early life and education ==
Elnora E. Monroe was born in Columbus, Pennsylvania, January 11, 1852.

She was a graduate of Jamestown High School and the Lyons Musical Academy.

== Career ==
At the age of eighteen, she married Prof. John W. Babcock, of Jamestown, New York, who served as city superintendent of public schools in Dunkirk, where they made their home. From early girlhood she felt the injustice of denying to woman a voice in government, which concerned her the same as a man, but as her time was taken up to a great extent in household affairs, and she lived in a community where few sympathized with her feelings and none were ready to come out and take a stand for freedom, she did not take an active part in the reforms of the day until 1889. Then, owing mainly to her efforts, a political equality club was organized in Dunkirk, of which she was made president. This club flourished under her management, and before the close of her first year as president of the Dunkirk club, she was elected president of the Chautauqua County Political Equality Club, which had twenty-five local clubs within its borders and a membership of 1,400.

At the close of her first year as president of that club, she was unanimously re-elected. On July 25, 1891, she had the honor of presiding over the first woman in suffrage meeting ever held at the Chautauqua Assembly, where, through the request of the county club, the subject was allowed to be advocated. Aside from the presidency of these clubs, she served upon a number of important committees connected with suffrage work, including chair of the National Woman Suffrage Association's press department. Although deeply interested in all the reforms of the day tending to the uplifting of humanity, she devoted most of her time to the enfranchisement of woman believing this to be the most important reform before the American people in that day, and one upon which all other reforms rest.

== Personal life ==
Babcock was a member of the Adams Memorial Unitarian church and of the Woman's Alliance of that church, and was a member of the Women's Literary Club. She died at her home in Dunkirk, on December 29, 1934, aged 82.

== Selected works ==
- "Susan B. Anthony, a life sketch", 1906
- "Why Cannot Women Vote", 1902
