= Russell, Pennsylvania =

Unincorporated community in Pennsylvania, US

- Unincorporated community and census-designated place
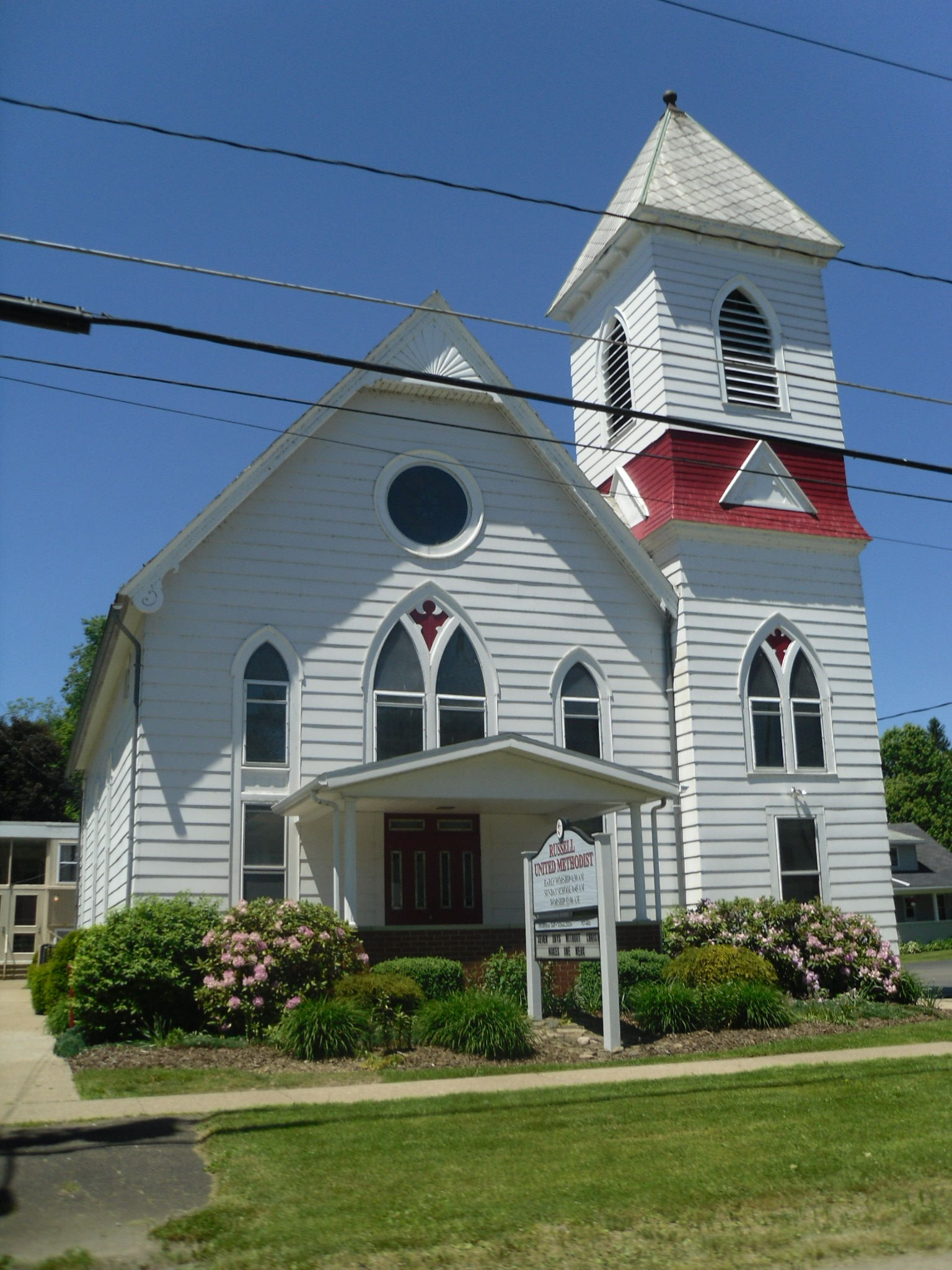
- The Russell United Methodist Church

- Location within Pennsylvania Location within the United States
- Coordinates: 41°56′29″N 79°8′6″W
- Country: United States
- State: Pennsylvania
- County: Warren
- Elevation: 1,250 ft (380 m)

Population (2021)
  - Total: 1,462
- Time zone: UTC-5 (Eastern (EST))
  - Summer (DST): UTC-4 (EDT)
- ZIP code: 16345
- Area code: 814
- GNIS feature ID: 1198199; 2631301

Russell is an unincorporated community and census-designated place in Pine Grove Township, Warren County, Pennsylvania, United States. The community is east of Lander and lies at the intersection of U.S. Route 62 and Pennsylvania Route 957. It is drained by Conewango Creek. As of the 2024 census, the population was 1,342.

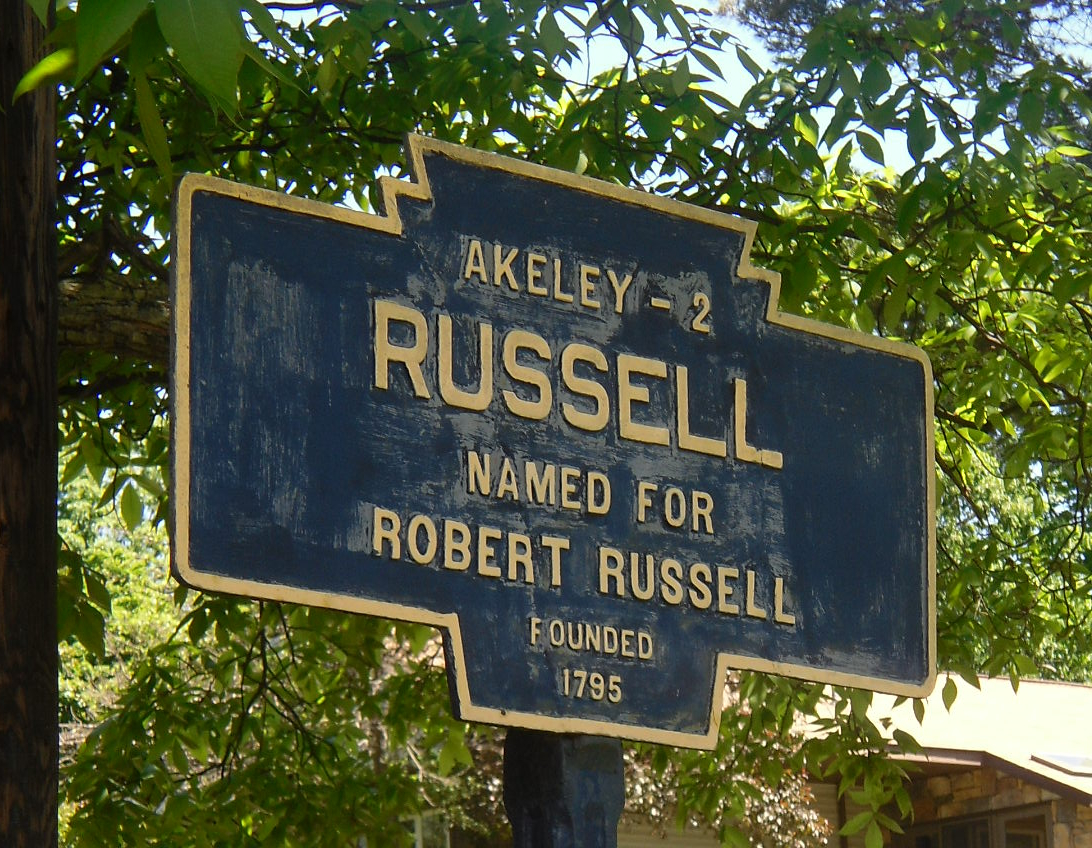
Keystone marker

== Education ==
It is in the Warren County School District.
