= Elk Township, Warren County, Pennsylvania =

Township in Pennsylvania, United States

Coordinates: 41°57′00″N 78°57′59″W

Elk Township
- Township
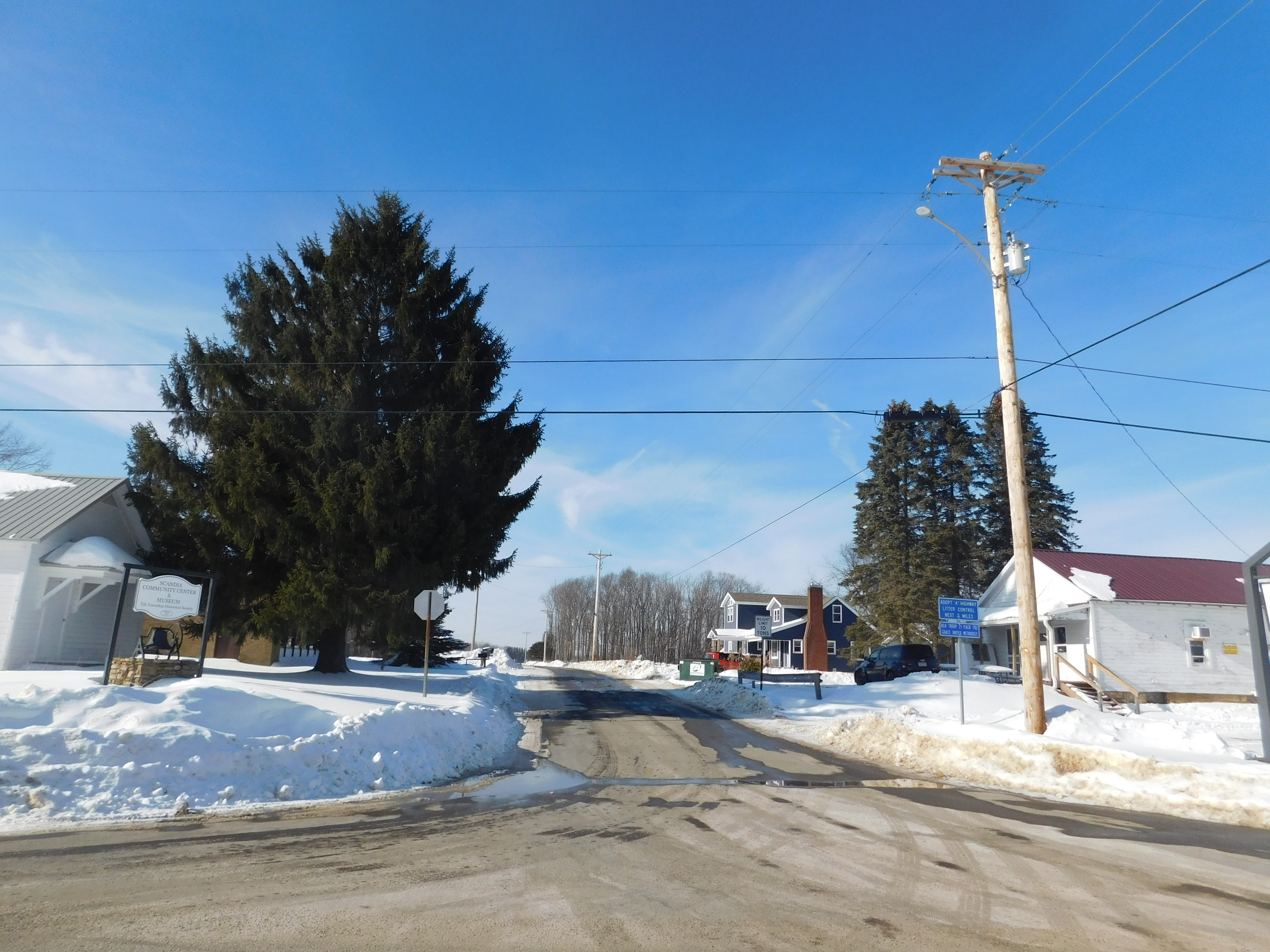
- The village of Scandia in Elk Township from State Route 1013.

- Logo

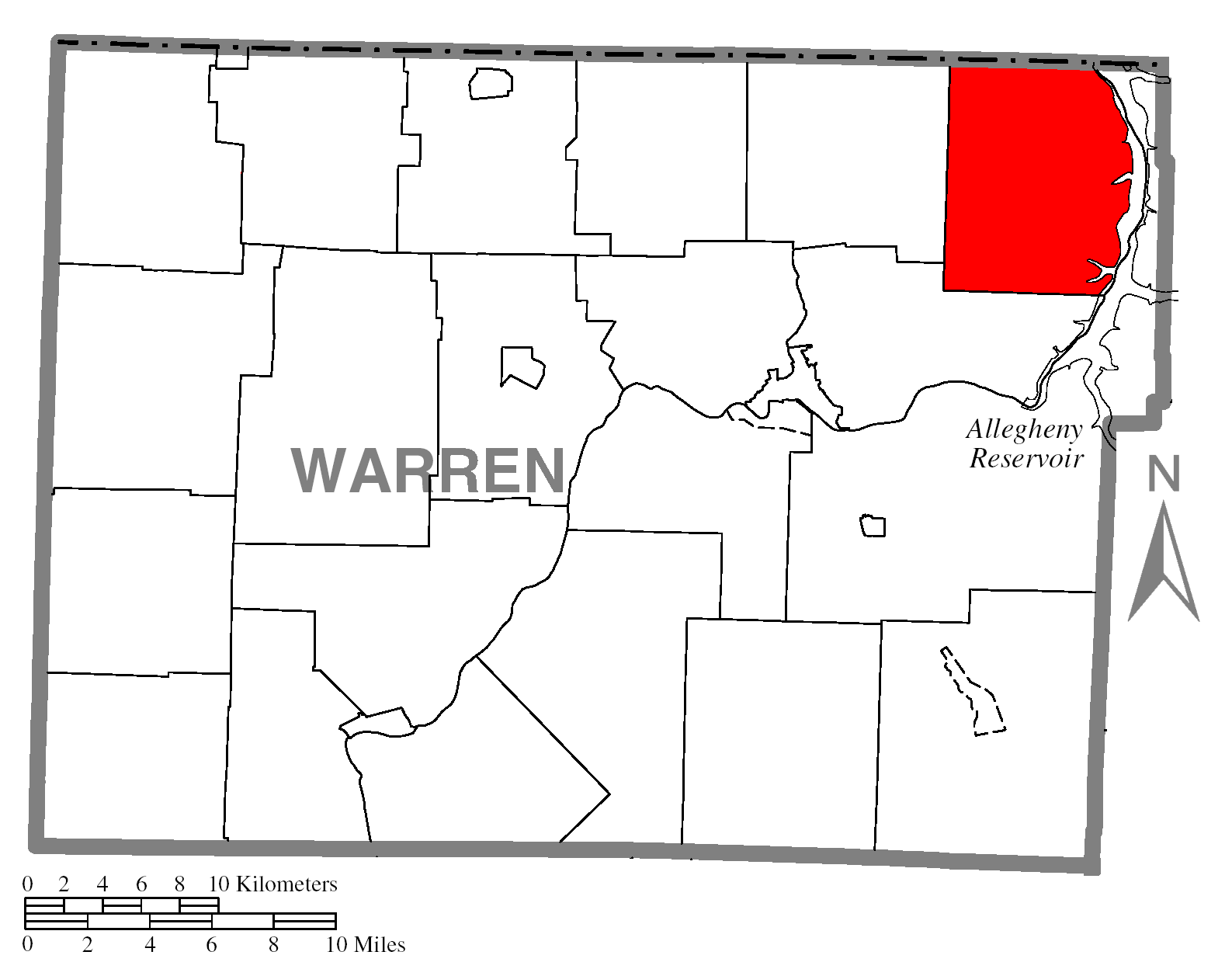
- Location of Elk Township in Warren County

- Location of Warren County in Pennsylvania
- Country: United States
- State: Pennsylvania
- County: Warren

Area
  - Total: 43.73 sq mi (113.26 km^{2})
  - Land: 41.02 sq mi (106.25 km^{2})
  - Water: 2.71 sq mi (7.01 km^{2})

Population (2020)
  - Total: 480
  - Estimate (2024): 464
  - Density: 12.3/sq mi (4.74/km^{2})
- Time zone: UTC-4 (EST)
  - Summer (DST): UTC-5 (EDT)
- Area code: 814
- FIPS code: 42-123-23064
- Website: elktownshipwarrencounty.org

Elk Township is a township in Warren County, Pennsylvania, United States. The population was 468 at the 2020 census, down from 520 at the 2010 census. 551 at the 2000 census.

== Geography ==
According to the United States Census Bureau, the township has a total area of 43.9 square miles (114 km^{2}), of which 41.3 square miles (107 km^{2}) is land and 2.6 square miles (6.7 km^{2}) (5.86%) is water.

== Demographics ==
Historical population
Census	Pop.	Note	%±
2000	551		—
2010	520		−5.6%
2020	482		−7.3%
2024 (est.)	464		−3.7%
U.S. Decennial Census

As of the census of 2000, there were 551 people, 214 households, and 167 families residing in the township. The population density was 13.3 people per square mile (5.2/km^{2}). There were 342 housing units at an average density of 8.3/sq mi (3.2/km^{2}). The racial makeup of the township was 98.73% White, and 1.27% from two or more races.

There were 214 households, out of which 32.7% had children under the age of 18 living with them, 72.4% were married couples living together, 2.3% had a female householder with no husband present, and 21.5% were non-families. 17.8% of all households were made up of individuals, and 7.9% had someone living alone who was 65 years of age or older. The average household size was 2.57 and the average family size was 2.89.

In the township the population was spread out, with 24.1% under the age of 18, 5.1% from 18 to 24, 29.2% from 25 to 44, 31.2% from 45 to 64, and 10.3% who were 65 years of age or older. The median age was 42 years. For every 100 females, there were 105.6 males. For every 100 females age 18 and over, there were 106.9 males.

The median income for a household in the township was $45,179, and the median income for a family was $48,125. Males had a median income of $35,313 versus $21,806 for females. The per capita income for the township was $20,592. About 0.6% of families and 2.0% of the population were below the poverty line, including 1.3% of those under age 18 and 3.6% of those age 65 or over.

== Communities and locations in Elk Township ==
- Scandia — The location of the township's government offices.
- Webbs Ferry — The western terminus of a former ferry service that ran between Elk Township and Corydon (West) across the Allegheny River. The ferry has been long discontinued, but the terminal remains in use as a boat launch, maintained by the Allegheny National Forest.

== Notable people ==
- Thaddeus C. Pound, Lieutenant Governor of Wisconsin, and grandfather of the poet Ezra Pound, was born in Elk Township.
- Cornplanter, the Seneca diplomat, lived most of his later life on an eponymous tract in Elk Township.
