= Columbus, Pennsylvania =

Unincorporated community in Pennsylvania, US

Coordinates: 41°56′38″N 79°34′43″W

- Census-designated place
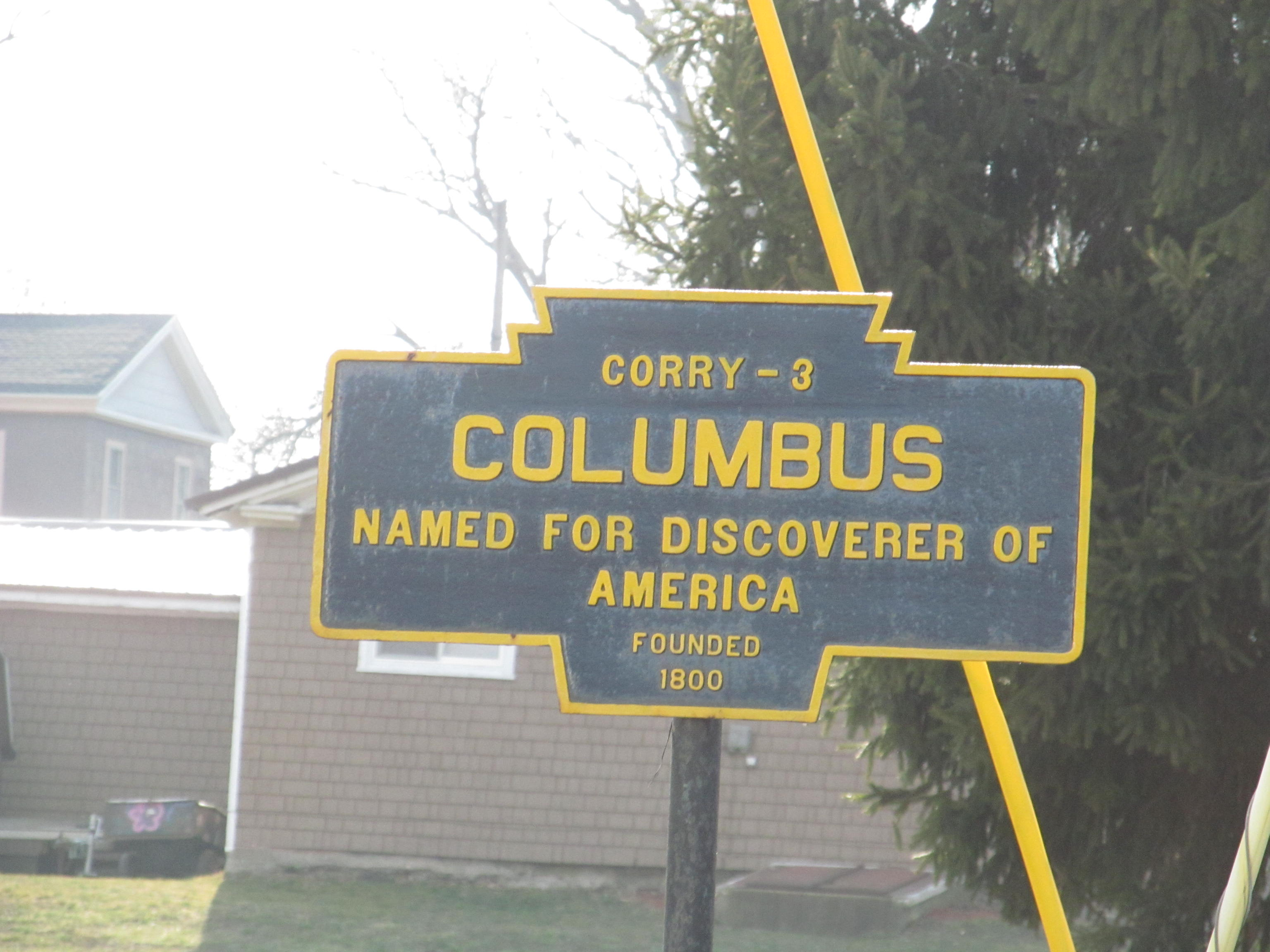
- Interactive map of Columbus, Pennsylvania
- Country: United States
- State: Pennsylvania
- County: Warren

Area
  - Total: 2.27 sq mi (5.87 km^{2})
  - Land: 2.27 sq mi (5.87 km^{2})
  - Water: 0 sq mi (0.00 km^{2})

Population (2020)
  - Total: 678
  - Density: 299.3/sq mi (115.56/km^{2})
- Time zone: UTC-5 (Eastern (EST))
  - Summer (DST): UTC-4 (EDT)
- ZIP code: 16405
- Area code: 814
- FIPS code: 42-15400

Columbus is a census-designated place located in Columbus Township, Warren County in the state of Pennsylvania, United States. The community is located along the famous U.S. Route 6 in northwestern Warren County. As of the 2010 census, the population was 824 residents. Columbus is within a few miles of the city of Corry, located in Erie County.

== Demographics ==
Historical population
Census	Pop.	Note	%±
2020	678		—
U.S. Decennial Census

== Education ==
It is in the Corry Area School District.

== Notable person ==
- Elnora Monroe Babcock, suffragist
