= Bear Lake, Pennsylvania =

Borough in Pennsylvania, US

- Borough
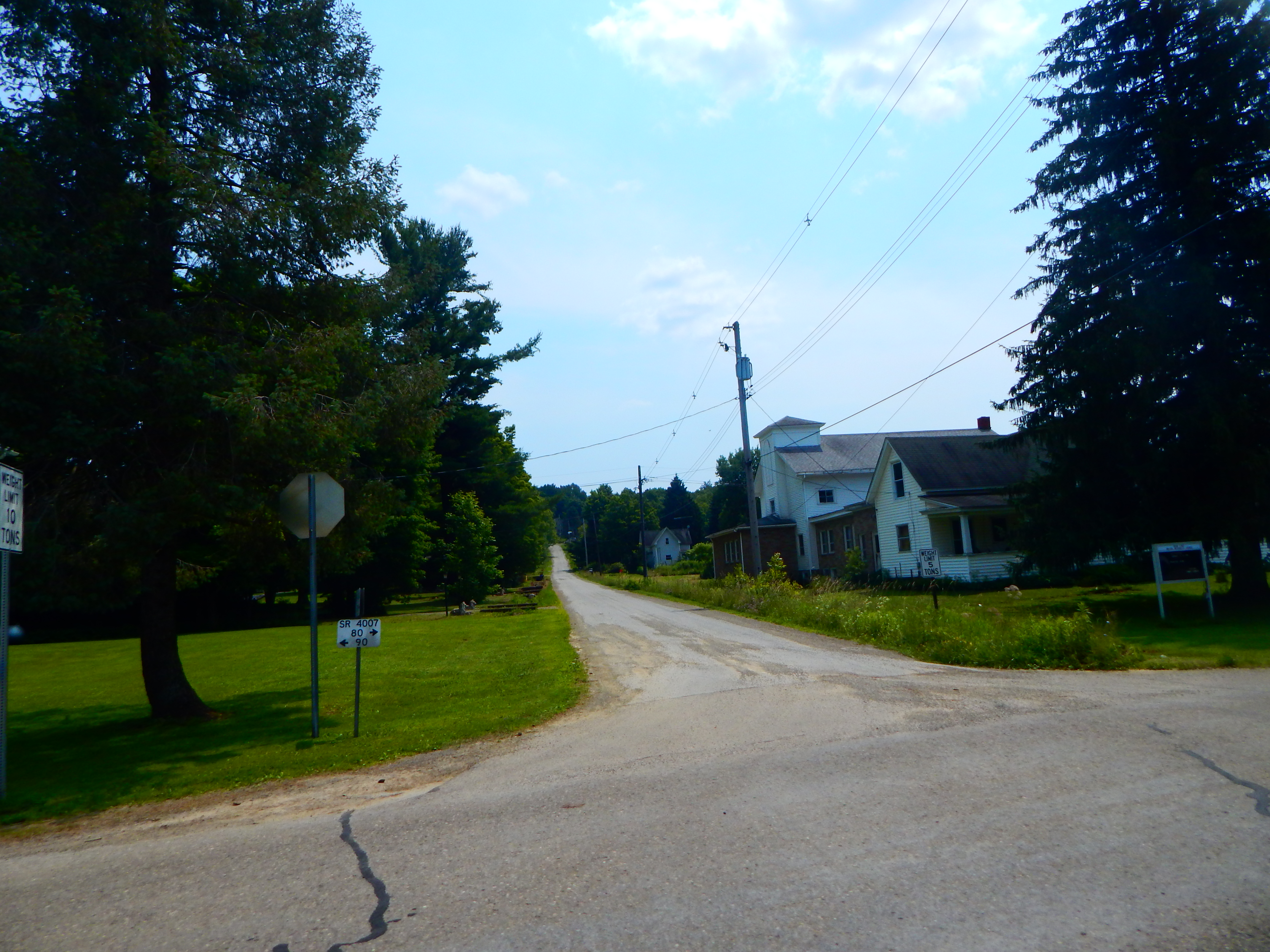
- Photo looking north along Center Street

- Location of Bear Lake in Warren County, Pennsylvania.

- Location of Bear Lake in Pennsylvania
- Coordinates: 41°59′34″N 79°30′20″W
- Country: United States
- State: Pennsylvania
- County: Warren
- Founded: 1887

Government
  - Mayor: Troyce Jehorek

Area
  - Total: 0.69 sq mi (1.79 km^{2})
  - Land: 0.69 sq mi (1.79 km^{2})
  - Water: 0 sq mi (0.00 km^{2})

Population (2020)
  - Total: 148
  - Density: 214.4/sq mi (82.78/km^{2})
- Time zone: UTC-4 (EST)
  - Summer (DST): UTC-5 (EDT)
- ZIP code: 16402
- Area code: 814
- FIPS code: 42-04608

Bear Lake is a borough in Warren County, Pennsylvania, United States. As of the 2020 census, Bear Lake had a population of 148.

== Geography ==
Bear Lake is located at 41°59′34″N 79°30′20″W (41.992823, -79.505610).

According to the United States Census Bureau, the borough has a total area of 0.7 square miles (1.8 km^{2}), all land.

== Demographics ==
Historical population
Census	Pop.	Note	%±
1880	154		—
1890	313		103.2%
1900	275		−12.1%
1910	221		−19.6%
1920	241		9.0%
1930	162		−32.8%
1940	214		32.1%
1950	239		11.7%
1960	260		8.8%
1970	281		8.1%
1980	249		−11.4%
1990	193		−22.5%
2000	193		0.0%
2010	164		−15.0%
2020	148		−9.8%

As of the census of 2000, there were 193 people, 66 households, and 55 families residing in the borough. The population density was 277.1 inhabitants per square mile (107.0/km^{2}). There were 74 housing units at an average density of 106.3 per square mile (41.0/km^{2}). The racial makeup of the borough was 100.00% White. Hispanic or Latino of any race were 0.52% of the population.

There were 66 households, out of which 39.4% had children under the age of 18 living with them, 72.7% were married couples living together, 10.6% had a female householder with no husband present, and 15.2% were non-families. 12.1% of all households were made up of individuals, and 4.5% had someone living alone who was 65 years of age or older. The average household size was 2.92 and the average family size was 3.18.

In the borough the population was spread out, with 26.4% under the age of 18, 5.7% from 18 to 24, 29.5% from 25 to 44, 23.3% from 45 to 64, and 15.0% who were 65 years of age or older. The median age was 38 years. For every 100 females there were 103.2 males. For every 100 females age 18 and over, there were 100.0 males.

The median income for a household in the borough was $28,036, and the median income for a family was $28,929. Males had a median income of $24,792 versus $19,000 for females. The per capita income for the borough was $10,329. About 3.7% of families and 3.3% of the population were below the poverty line, including none of those under the age of eighteen or sixty five or over.

== Education ==
It is in the Warren County School District.
