= Columbus Township, Warren County, Pennsylvania =

Township in Pennsylvania, United States

Coordinates: 41°57′00″N 79°32′59″W

Columbus Township
- Township
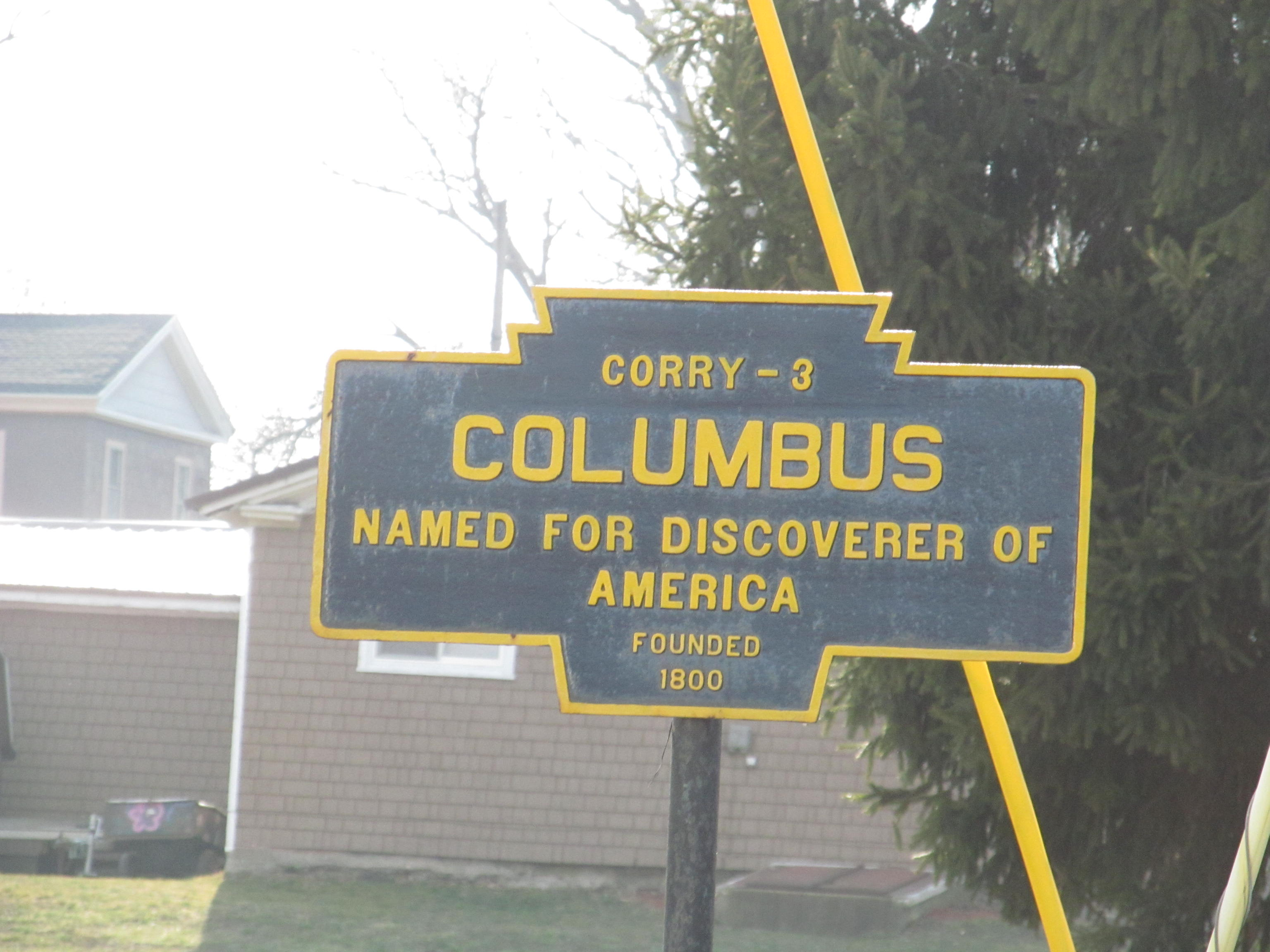

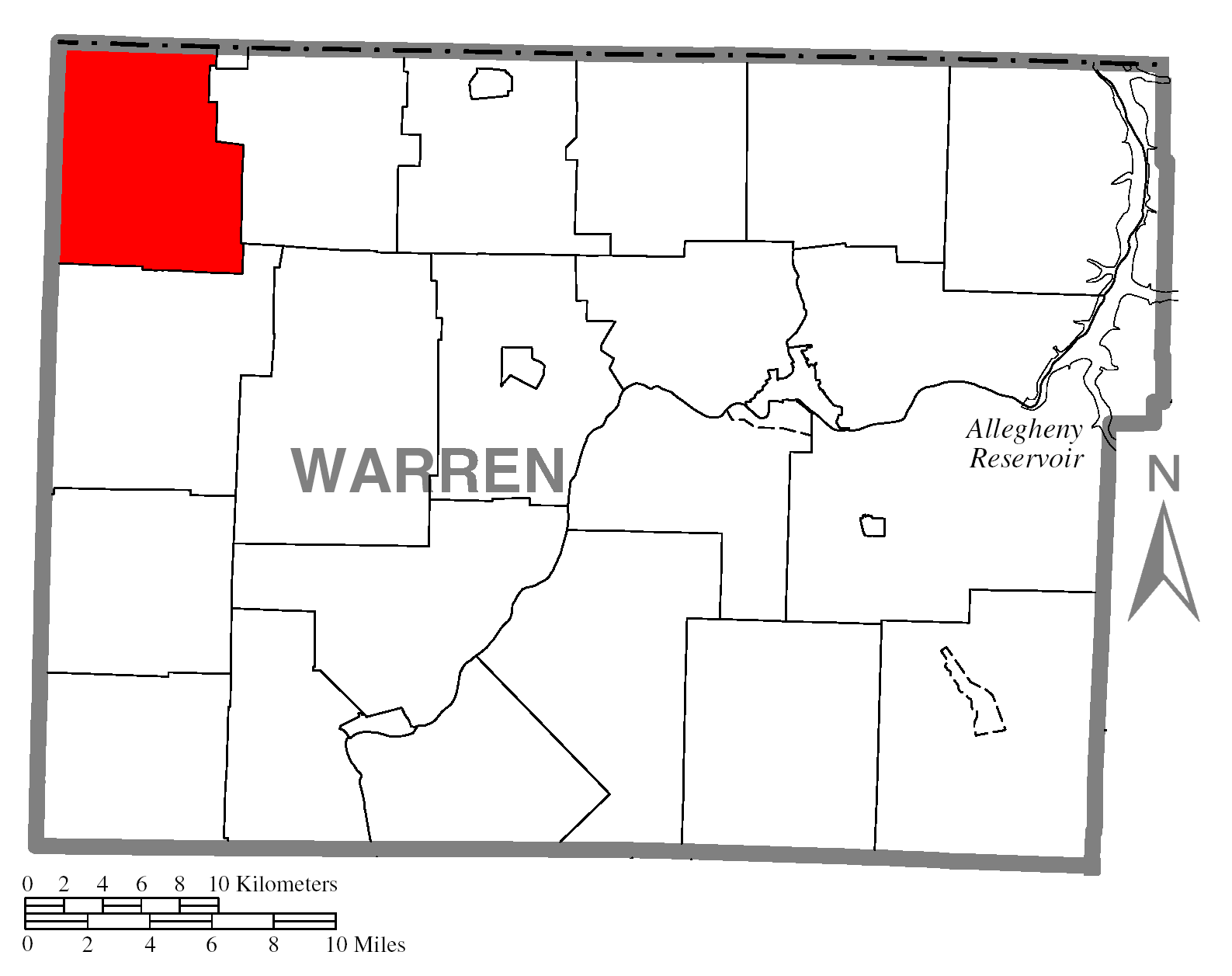
- Location of Columbus Township in Warren County

- Location of Warren County in Pennsylvania
- Country: United States
- State: Pennsylvania
- County: Warren

Area
  - Total: 40.67 sq mi (105.33 km^{2})
  - Land: 40.66 sq mi (105.32 km^{2})
  - Water: 0.0039 sq mi (0.01 km^{2})

Population (2020)
  - Total: 1,603
  - Estimate (2024): 1,556
  - Density: 48.0/sq mi (18.53/km^{2})
- Time zone: UTC-4 (EST)
  - Summer (DST): UTC-5 (EDT)
- Area code: 814
- FIPS code: 42-123-15408

Columbus Township is a township in Warren County, Pennsylvania, United States. The population was 1,603 at the 2020 census, down from 2,034 at the 2010 census.

== Geography ==
According to the United States Census Bureau, the township has a total area of 40.6 square miles (105 km^{2}), all land. It contains the census-designated place of Columbus.

== Demographics ==
Historical population
Census	Pop.	Note	%±
2000	1,741		—
2010	2,034		16.8%
2020	1,604		−21.1%
2024 (est.)	1,556		−3.0%
U.S. Decennial Census

As of the census of 2000, there were 1,741 people, 663 households, and 489 families residing in the township. The population density was 42.9 inhabitants per square mile (16.6/km^{2}). There were 733 housing units at an average density of 18.0/sq mi (7.0/km^{2}). The racial makeup of the township was 98.39% White, 0.11% African American, 0.29% Native American, 0.17% from other races, and 1.03% from two or more races. Hispanic or Latino of any race were 0.34% of the population.

There were 663 households, out of which 33.8% had children under the age of 18 living with them, 61.4% were married couples living together, 8.0% had a female householder with no husband present, and 26.1% were non-families. 20.8% of all households were made up of individuals, and 10.7% had someone living alone who was 65 years of age or older. The average household size was 2.63 and the average family size was 3.03.

In the township the population was spread out, with 25.4% under the age of 18, 7.2% from 18 to 24, 27.1% from 25 to 44, 27.1% from 45 to 64, and 13.3% who were 65 years of age or older. The median age was 39 years. For every 100 females, there were 95.6 males. For every 100 females age 18 and over, there were 97.0 males.

The median income for a household in the township was $36,905, and the median income for a family was $42,557. Males had a median income of $31,302 versus $24,048 for females. The per capita income for the township was $17,586. About 6.8% of families and 10.7% of the population were below the poverty line, including 17.7% of those under age 18 and 3.9% of those age 65 or over.
