= Lander, Pennsylvania =

Unincorporated community in Pennsylvania

Coordinates: 41°58′01″N 79°14′17″W

Lander is an unincorporated community in Farmington Township in Warren County, Pennsylvania, United States.
