= Freehold Township, Warren County, Pennsylvania =

Township in Pennsylvania, United States

Coordinates: 41°58′00″N 79°30′05″W

Freehold Township
- Township
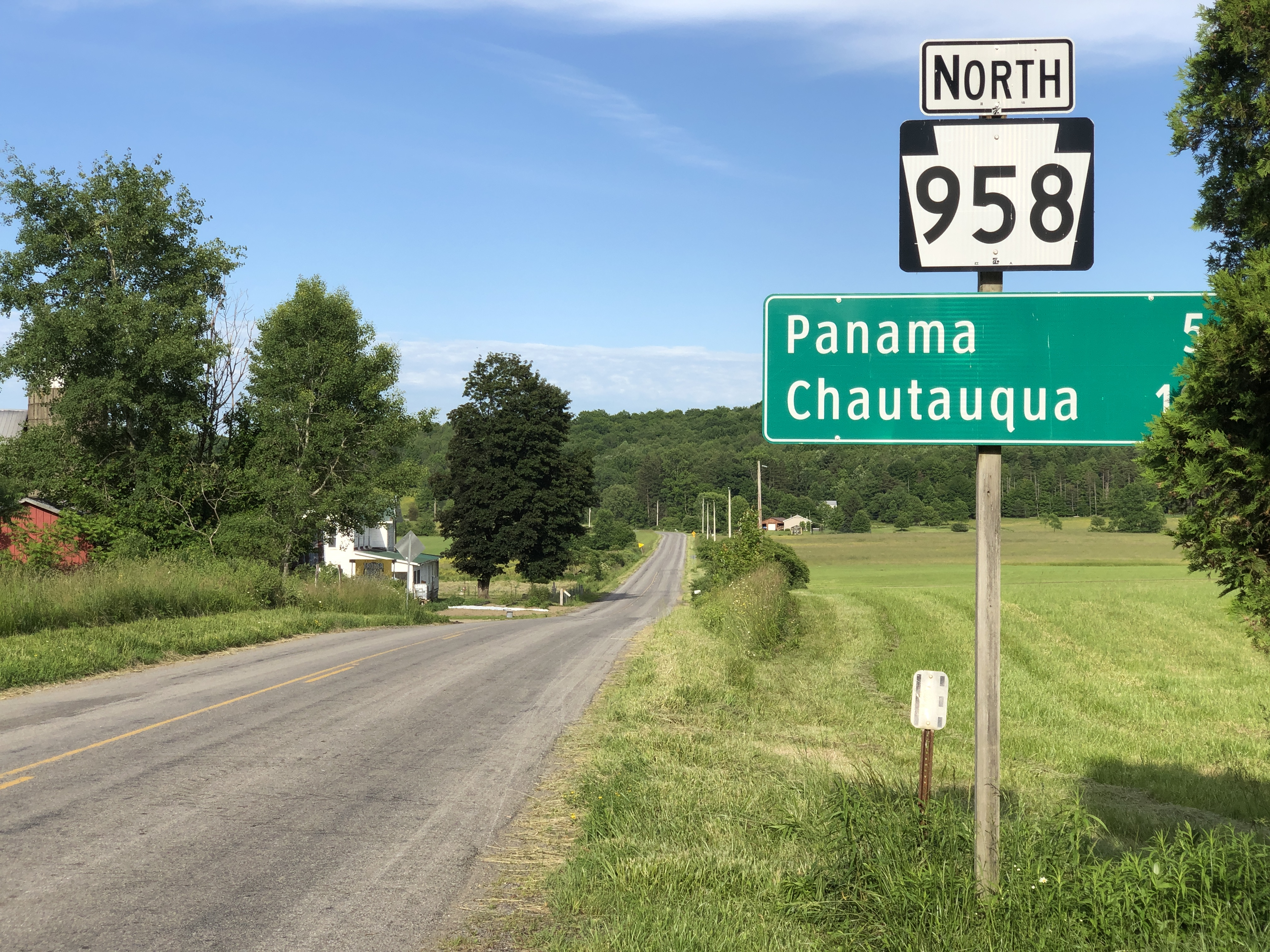
- PA 958 in Freehold Township

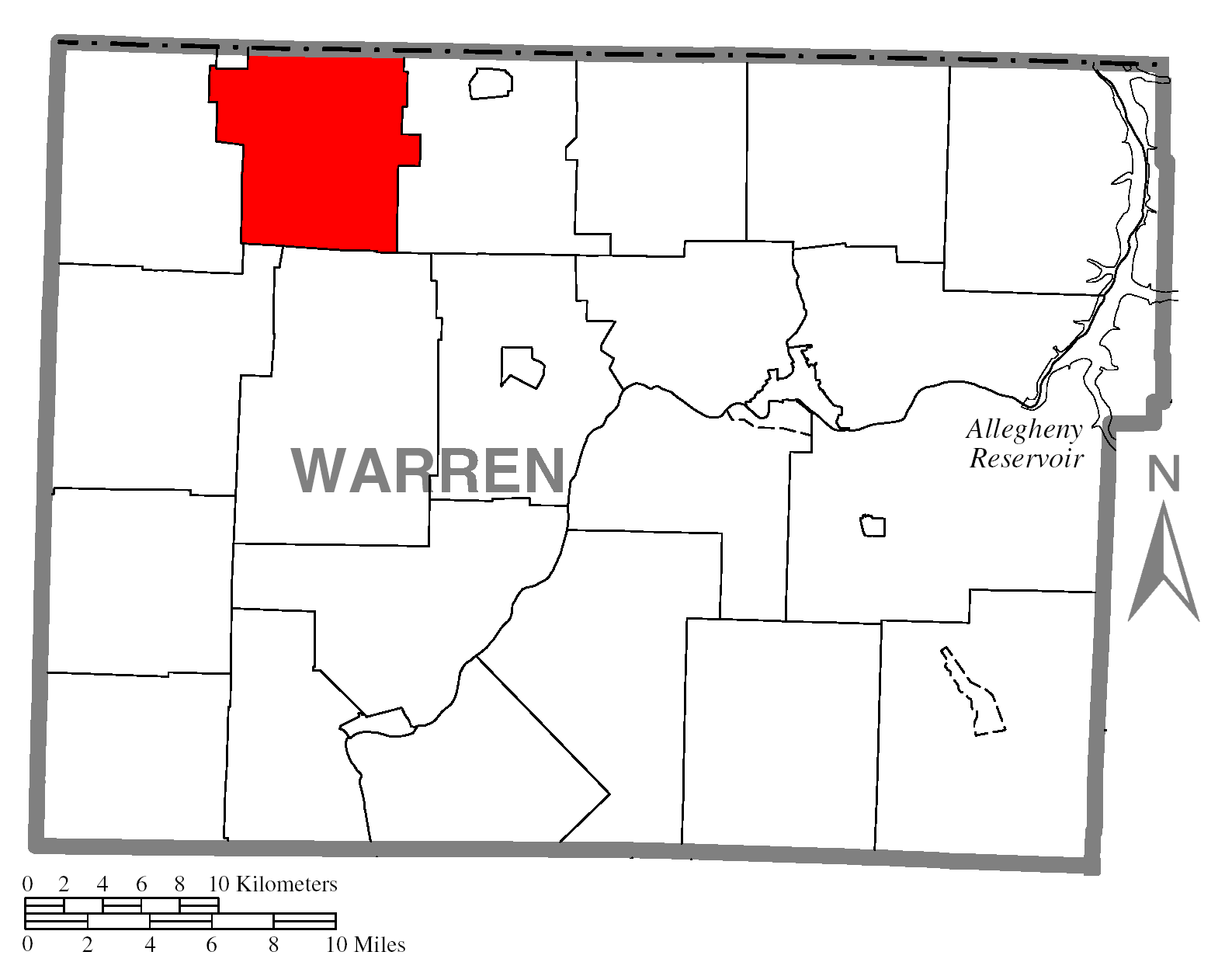
- Location of Freehold Township in Warren County

- Location of Warren County in Pennsylvania
- Country: United States
- State: Pennsylvania
- County: Warren

Area
  - Total: 35.78 sq mi (92.68 km^{2})
  - Land: 35.74 sq mi (92.57 km^{2})
  - Water: 0.042 sq mi (0.11 km^{2})

Population (2020)
  - Total: 1,212
  - Estimate (2024): 1,175
  - Density: 40.6/sq mi (15.66/km^{2})
- Time zone: UTC-4 (EST)
  - Summer (DST): UTC-5 (EDT)
- Area code: 814
- FIPS code: 42-123-27736

Freehold Township is a township in Warren County, Pennsylvania, United States. The population was 1,212 at the 2020 census, down from 1,510 at the 2010 census.

== Geography ==
According to the United States Census Bureau, the township has a total area of 35.6 square miles (92 km^{2}), of which 35.6 square miles (92 km^{2}) is land and 0.04 square miles (0.10 km^{2}) (0.11%) is water.

== Demographics ==
Historical population
Census	Pop.	Note	%±
2000	1,402		—
2010	1,510		7.7%
2020	1,214		−19.6%
2024 (est.)	1,175		−3.2%
U.S. Decennial Census

As of the census of 2000, there were 1,402 people, 463 households, and 364 families residing in the township. The population density was 39.4 people per square mile (15.2 people/km^{2}). There were 531 housing units at an average density of 14.9 per square mile (5.8/km^{2}). The racial makeup of the township was 98.79% White, 0.14% African American, 0.14% Native American, 0.14% Asian, and 0.78% from two or more races.

There were 463 households, out of which 40.2% had children under the age of 18 living with them, 65.0% were married couples living together, 6.3% had a female householder with no husband present, and 21.2% were non-families. 19.0% of all households were made up of individuals, and 7.6% had someone living alone who was 65 years of age or older. The average household size was 3.03 and the average family size was 3.47.

In the township the population was spread out, with 35.7% under the age of 18, 6.1% from 18 to 24, 27.1% from 25 to 44, 21.1% from 45 to 64, and 10.0% who were 65 years of age or older. The median age was 32 years. For every 100 females, there were 97.7 males. For every 100 females age 18 and over, there were 104.3 males.

The median income for a household in the township was $34,479, and the median income for a family was $38,095. Males had a median income of $28,409 versus $23,125 for females. The per capita income for the township was $13,103. About 10.3% of families and 19.9% of the population were below the poverty line, including 34.3% of those under age 18 and 11.1% of those age 65 or over.
