= Farmington Township, Warren County, Pennsylvania =

Township in Pennsylvania, United States

Coordinates: 41°57′00″N 79°13′59″W

Farmington Township
- Township
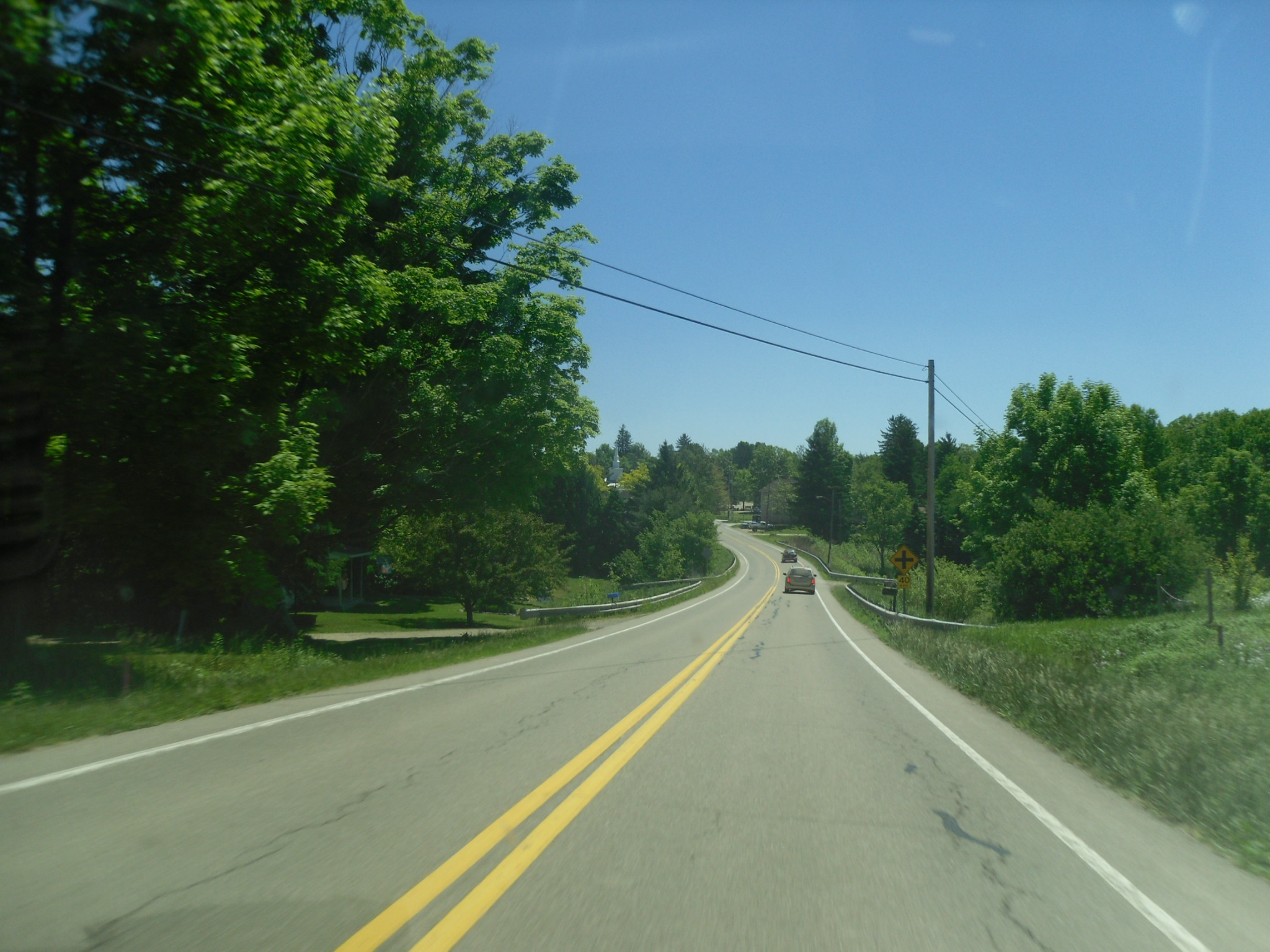
- Eastbound PA 957 in the village of Lander

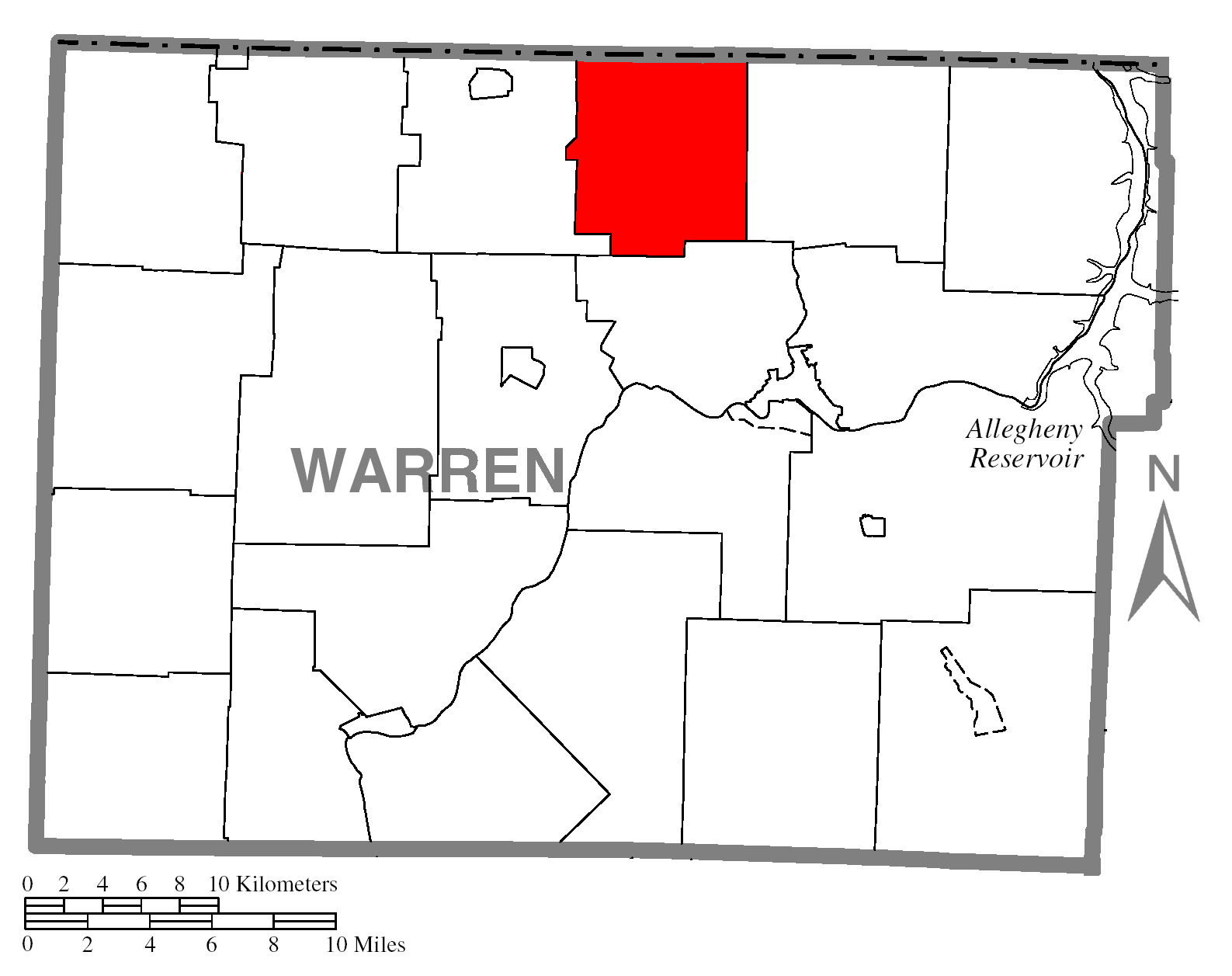
- Location of Farmington Township in Warren County

- Location of Warren County in Pennsylvania
- Country: United States
- State: Pennsylvania
- County: Warren County

Area
  - Total: 34.22 sq mi (88.62 km^{2})
  - Land: 34.19 sq mi (88.56 km^{2})
  - Water: 0.023 sq mi (0.06 km^{2})

Population (2020)
  - Total: 1,281
  - Estimate (2024): 1,261
  - Density: 35.5/sq mi (13.71/km^{2})
- Time zone: UTC-4 (EST)
  - Summer (DST): UTC-5 (EDT)
- Area code: 814
- FIPS code: 42-123-25304
- Website: https://www.farmingtontwp.net/

Farmington Township is a township in Warren County, Pennsylvania, United States. The population was 1,281 at the 2020 census, up from 1,259 in 2010.

== Geography ==
According to the United States Census Bureau, the township has a total area of 34.1 square miles (88 km^{2}), of which 34.1 square miles (88 km^{2}) is land and 0.04 square miles (0.10 km^{2}) (0.06%) is water.

== Demographics ==
Historical population
Census	Pop.	Note	%±
2000	1,353		—
2010	1,259		−6.9%
2020	1,281		1.7%
2024 (est.)	1,261		−1.6%
U.S. Decennial Census

As of the census of 2000, there were 1,353 people, 478 households, and 381 families residing in the township. The population density was 39.7 people per square mile (15.3 people/km^{2}). There were 523 housing units at an average density of 15.3 per square mile (5.9/km^{2}). The racial makeup of the township was 98.23% White, 0.59% African American, 0.15% Native American, 0.30% Asian, 0.07% from other races, and 0.67% from two or more races. Hispanic or Latino of any race were 0.59% of the population.

There were 478 households, out of which 37.0% had children under the age of 18 living with them, 68.0% were married couples living together, 6.5% had a female householder with no husband present, and 20.1% were non-families. 16.1% of all households were made up of individuals, and 5.9% had someone living alone who was 65 years of age or older. The average household size was 2.83 and the average family size was 3.17.

In the township the population was spread out, with 28.8% under the age of 18, 7.2% from 18 to 24, 28.3% from 25 to 44, 25.1% from 45 to 64, and 10.6% who were 65 years of age or older. The median age was 37 years. For every 100 females, there were 109.1 males. For every 100 females age 18 and over, there were 104.9 males.

The median income for a household in the township was $42,400, and the median income for a family was $44,313. Males had a median income of $32,174 versus $23,403 for females. The per capita income for the township was $16,747. About 8.7% of families and 13.0% of the population were below the poverty line, including 22.1% of those under age 18 and 7.5% of those age 65 or over.
