= Pine Grove Township, Warren County, Pennsylvania =

Township in Pennsylvania, United States

Coordinates: 41°57′00″N 79°06′59″W

Pine Grove Township
- Township
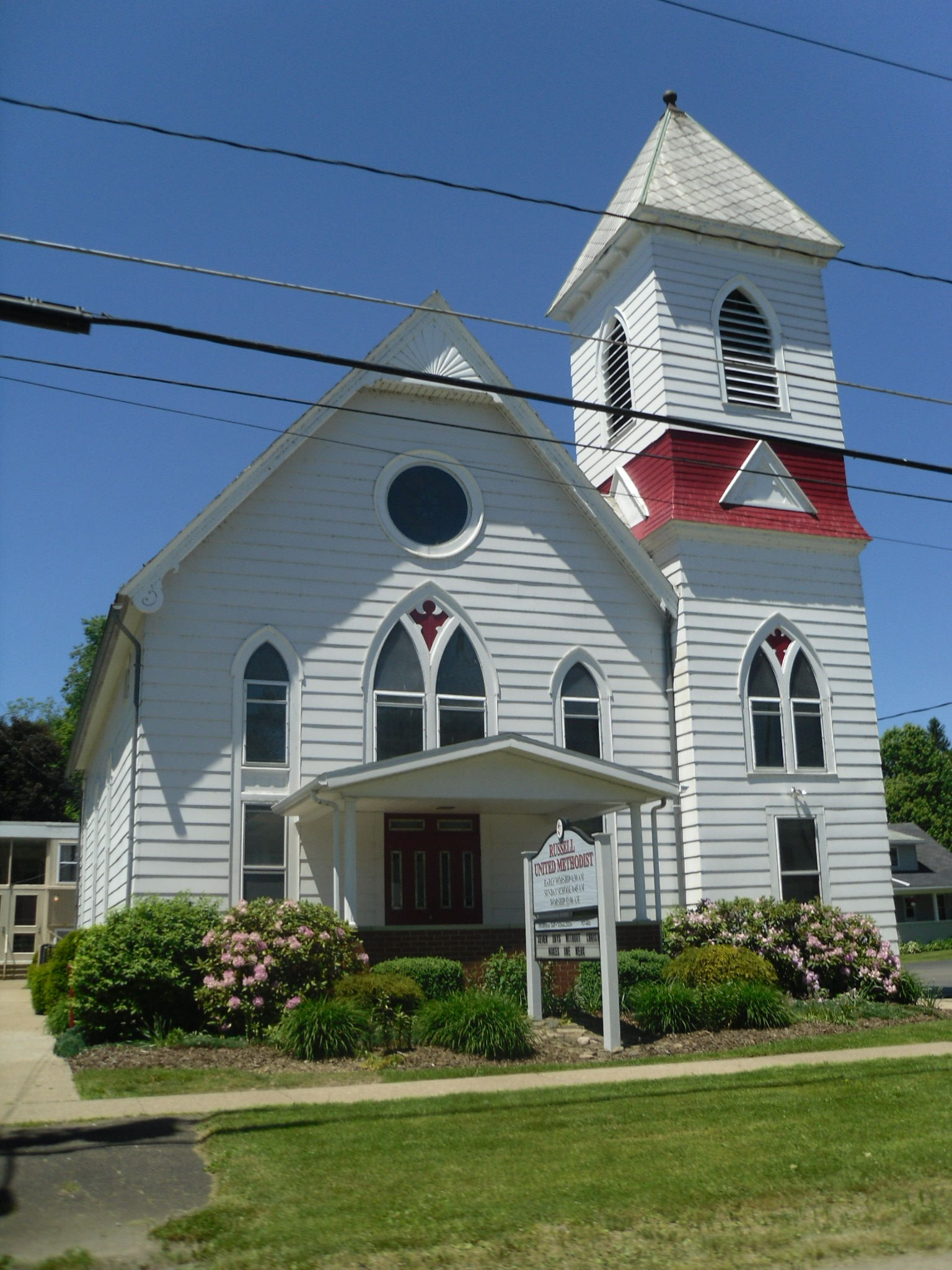
- Russel United Methodist in Pine Grove Township

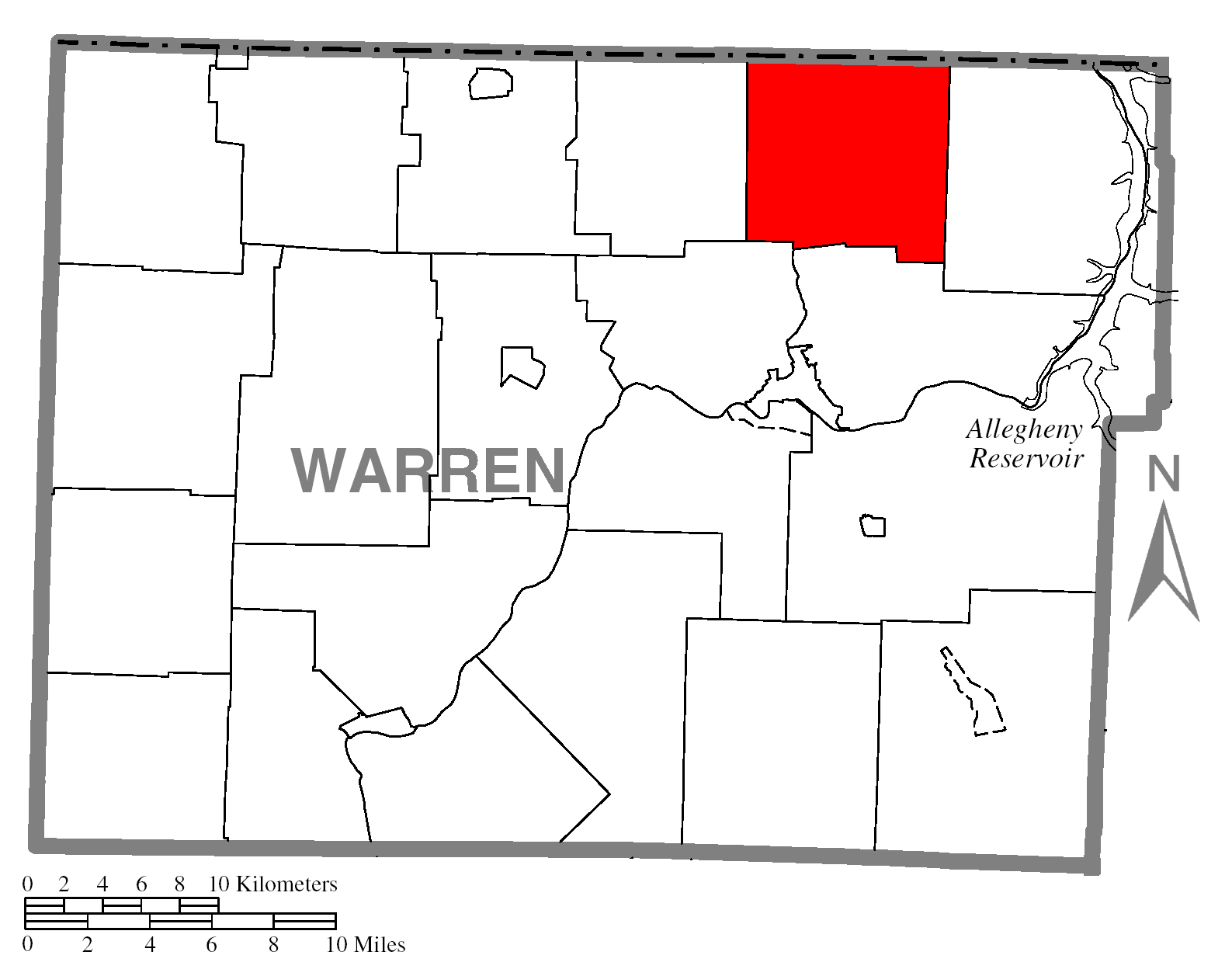
- Location of Pine Grove Township in Warren County

- Location of Warren County in Pennsylvania
- Country: United States
- State: Pennsylvania
- County: Warren

Area
  - Total: 39.90 sq mi (103.33 km^{2})
  - Land: 39.65 sq mi (102.69 km^{2})
  - Water: 0.25 sq mi (0.64 km^{2})

Population (2020)
  - Total: 2,599
  - Estimate (2024): 2,509
  - Density: 65.2/sq mi (25.19/km^{2})
- Time zone: UTC-4 (EST)
  - Summer (DST): UTC-5 (EDT)
- Area code: 814
- FIPS code: 42-123-60480
- Website: https://www.pinegrovetownship.org/

Pine Grove Township is a township in Warren County, Pennsylvania, United States. As of the 2020 census, the township population was 2,599, down from 2,965 at the 2010 census.

== History ==
The Guy C. Irvine House was added to the National Register of Historic Places in 1978.

== Geography ==
According to the United States Census Bureau, the township has a total area of 40.0 square miles (104 km^{2}), of which 39.7 square miles (103 km^{2}) is land and 0.3 square miles (0.78 km^{2}) (0.68%) is water. It contains the census-designated place of Russell.

== Demographics ==
Historical population
Census	Pop.	Note	%±
2000	2,712		—
2010	2,695		−0.6%
2020	2,599		−3.6%
2024 (est.)	2,509		−3.5%
U.S. Decennial Census

As of the census of 2000, there were 2,712 people, 1,084 households, and 822 families residing in the township. The population density was 68.4 people per square mile (26.4 people/km^{2}). There were 1,193 housing units at an average density of 30.1 per square mile (11.6/km^{2}). The racial makeup of the township was 98.60% White, 0.11% African American, 0.18% Native American, 0.55% Asian, 0.07% from other races, and 0.48% from two or more races. Hispanic or Latino of any race were 0.26% of the population.

There were 1,084 households, out of which 31.5% had children under the age of 18 living with them, 66.8% were married couples living together, 5.9% had a female householder with no husband present, and 24.1% were non-families. 20.4% of all households were made up of individuals, and 10.1% had someone living alone who was 65 years of age or older. The average household size was 2.50 and the average family size was 2.89.

In the township the population was spread out, with 24.2% under the age of 18, 4.6% from 18 to 24, 27.1% from 25 to 44, 29.5% from 45 to 64, and 14.7% who were 65 years of age or older. The median age was 42 years. For every 100 females, there were 101.3 males. For every 100 females age 18 and over, there were 96.7 males.

The median income for a household in the township was $43,454, and the median income for a family was $47,346. Males had a median income of $37,000 versus $22,500 for females. The per capita income for the township was $20,144. About 2.7% of families and 5.4% of the population were below the poverty line, including 9.5% of those under age 18 and 2.8% of those age 65 or over.
