= Warren County, Pennsylvania =

County in Pennsylvania, United States

- County
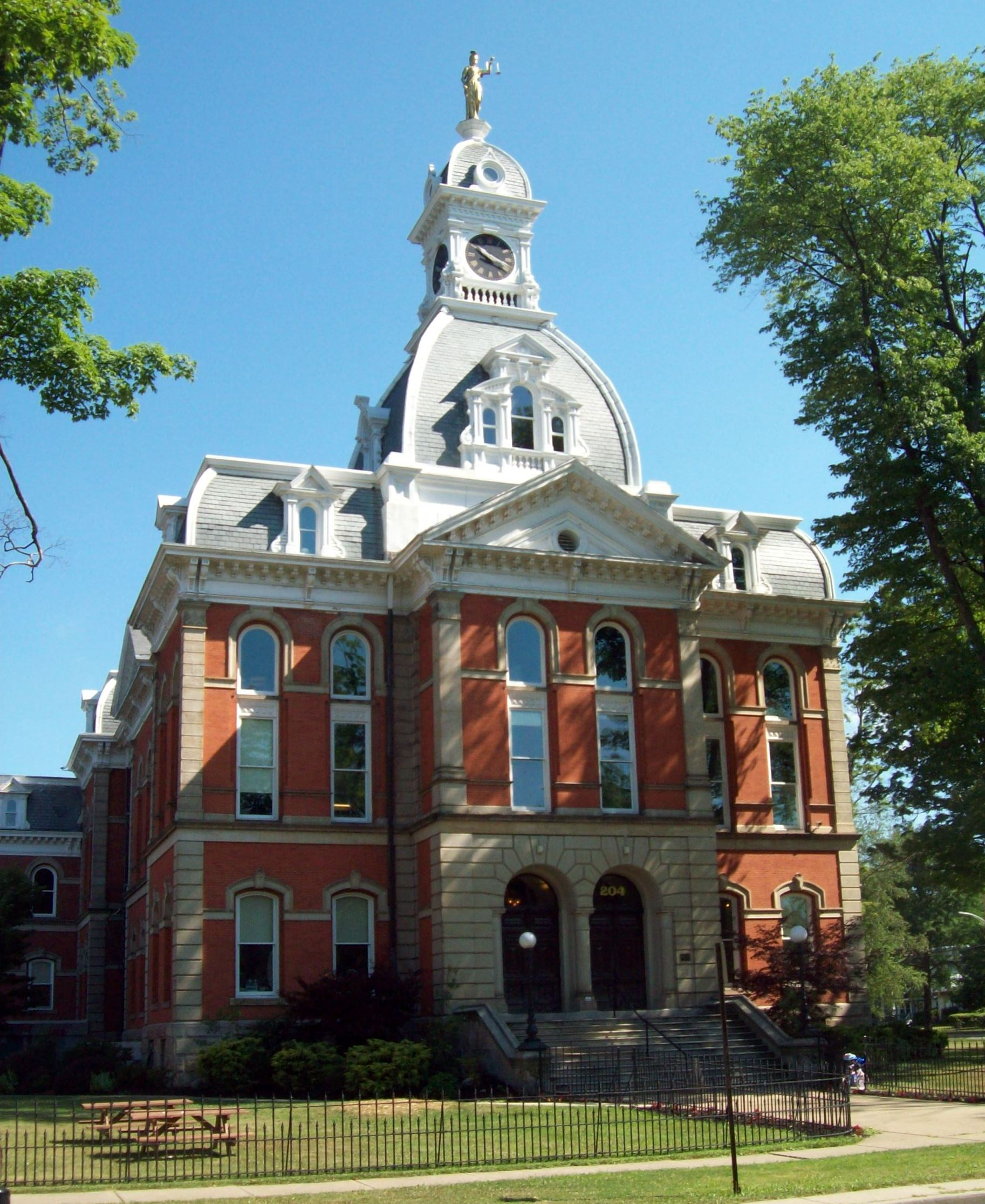
- Warren County Courthouse

- Logo

- Location within the U.S. state of Pennsylvania
- Coordinates: 41°49′N 79°16′W
- Country: United States
- State: Pennsylvania
- Founded: October 1, 1819
- Named for: Joseph Warren
- Seat: Warren
- Largest city: Warren

Area
  - Total: 899 sq mi (2,330 km^{2})
  - Land: 884 sq mi (2,290 km^{2})
  - Water: 14.1 sq mi (37 km^{2}) 1.6%

Population (2020)
  - Total: 38,587
  - Estimate (2025): 37,038 ▼
  - Density: 42.3/sq mi (16.3/km^{2})
- Time zone: UTC−5 (Eastern)
  - Summer (DST): UTC−4 (EDT)
- Congressional district: 15th
- Website: warrencountypa.gov

Warren County is a county in the Commonwealth of Pennsylvania. As of the 2020 census, the population was 38,587. Its county seat is Warren. The county was established in 1800 from parts of Allegheny and Lycoming counties; attached to Crawford County until 1805 and then to Venango County until Warren was formally established in 1819.

Warren County makes up the Warren, Pennsylvania micropolitan statistical area. The county is part of the North Central Pennsylvania region of the state. (Note: Includes Clearfield, Jefferson, Tioga, McKean, Warren, Clarion, Elk, Potter, Forest and Cameron Counties)

== Geography ==
According to the U.S. Census Bureau, the county has a total area of 899 square miles (2,330 km^{2}), of which 884 square miles (2,290 km^{2}) is land and 14 square miles (36 km^{2}) (1.6%) is water. Notable physical features include the Allegheny River, the Allegheny Reservoir, the Kinzua Dam, and the Allegheny National Forest.

=== Climate ===
Warren county has a warm-summer humid continental climate (Dfb) and average temperatures in the city of Warren range from 24.5 °F in January to 69.3 °F in July.

=== Adjacent counties ===
- Chautauqua County, New York (north)
- Cattaraugus County, New York (northeast)
- McKean County (east)
- Elk County (southeast)
- Forest County (south)
- Venango County (southwest)
- Crawford County (west)
- Erie County (west)

=== National protected area ===
- Allegheny National Forest (part)
- Allegheny National Recreation Area (part)

=== Major highways ===
- US 6
- US 62
- PA 27
- PA 59
- PA 69
- PA 127
- PA 346
- PA 426
- PA 666
- PA 948
- PA 957
- PA 958

== Recreation ==
There is one Pennsylvania state park in Warren County. Chapman State Park is adjacent to Allegheny National Forest and State Game Land 29 just of U.S. Route 6, near Clarendon. Warren County also contains a tract of old-growth forest called Hearts Content National Scenic Area.

== Micropolitan Statistical Area ==
The United States Office of Management and Budget has designated Warren County as the Warren, PA Micropolitan Statistical Area (μSA). As of the 2010 United States census the micropolitan area ranked 14th most populous in the State of Pennsylvania and the 298th most populous in the United States with a population of 41,815.

=== Climate ===
Climate data for CHANDLERS VALLEY 1SE, PA (1991-2020 normals) (Records 2004-Present)
Month	Jan	Feb	Mar	Apr	May	Jun	Jul	Aug	Sep	Oct	Nov	Dec	Year
Record high °F (°C)	65 (18)	73 (23)	80 (27)	85 (29)	91 (33)	93 (34)	98 (37)	91 (33)	92 (33)	85 (29)	76 (24)	65 (18)	98 (37)
Mean daily maximum °F (°C)	30.7 (−0.7)	33.5 (0.8)	42.7 (5.9)	56.7 (13.7)	68.4 (20.2)	76.9 (24.9)	80.4 (26.9)	78.7 (25.9)	72.6 (22.6)	59.6 (15.3)	46.5 (8.1)	35.6 (2.0)	56.9 (13.8)
Daily mean °F (°C)	22.0 (−5.6)	22.9 (−5.1)	31.3 (−0.4)	43.3 (6.3)	54.2 (12.3)	63.0 (17.2)	66.8 (19.3)	65.4 (18.6)	59.1 (15.1)	47.8 (8.8)	37.1 (2.8)	27.9 (−2.3)	45.1 (7.3)
Mean daily minimum °F (°C)	13.2 (−10.4)	12.3 (−10.9)	19.9 (−6.7)	29.9 (−1.2)	40.1 (4.5)	49.2 (9.6)	53.2 (11.8)	52.2 (11.2)	45.6 (7.6)	36.0 (2.2)	27.6 (−2.4)	20.2 (−6.6)	33.3 (0.7)
Record low °F (°C)	−21 (−29)	−32 (−36)	−25 (−32)	8 (−13)	22 (−6)	30 (−1)	37 (3)	38 (3)	27 (−3)	19 (−7)	2 (−17)	−14 (−26)	−32 (−36)
Average precipitation inches (mm)	3.73 (95)	2.47 (63)	3.36 (85)	4.17 (106)	4.39 (112)	4.61 (117)	5.52 (140)	4.09 (104)	4.22 (107)	4.33 (110)	3.97 (101)	4.01 (102)	48.87 (1,241)
Average snowfall inches (cm)	31.4 (80)	26.5 (67)	12.7 (32)	6.7 (17)	0.1 (0.25)	0.0 (0.0)	0.0 (0.0)	0.0 (0.0)	0.0 (0.0)	0.6 (1.5)	9.7 (25)	28.0 (71)	115.7 (294)
Average precipitation days (≥ 0.01 in)	21.2	17.3	15.5	16.3	14.4	14.2	13.1	12.6	11.3	16.5	15.5	19.4	187.3
Average snowy days (≥ 0.1 in)	13.4	11.7	6.3	2.8	0.1	0.0	0.0	0.0	0.0	0.4	3.9	10.2	48.8
Source: NOAA

== Demographics ==
Historical population
Census	Pop.	Note	%±
1800	233		—
1810	827		254.9%
1820	1,976		138.9%
1830	4,697		137.7%
1840	9,278		97.5%
1850	13,671		47.3%
1860	19,190		40.4%
1870	23,897		24.5%
1880	27,981		17.1%
1890	37,585		34.3%
1900	38,946		3.6%
1910	39,573		1.6%
1920	40,024		1.1%
1930	41,453		3.6%
1940	42,789		3.2%
1950	42,698		−0.2%
1960	45,582		6.8%
1970	47,682		4.6%
1980	47,449		−0.5%
1990	45,050		−5.1%
2000	43,863		−2.6%
2010	41,815		−4.7%
2020	38,587		−7.7%
2025 (est.)	37,038	▼	−4.0%
U.S. Decennial Census; 1790-1960 1900-1990; 1990-2000 2010-2017 2010-2020

=== Racial and ethnic composition ===
Warren County, Pennsylvania – Racial and ethnic composition Note: the US Census treats Hispanic/Latino as an ethnic category. This table excludes Latinos from the racial categories and assigns them to a separate category. Hispanics/Latinos may be of any race.
Race / Ethnicity (NH = Non-Hispanic)	Pop 1980	Pop 1990	Pop 2000	Pop 2010	Pop 2020	% 1980	% 1990	% 2000	% 2010	% 2020
White alone (NH)	47,113	44,687	43,176	40,827	36,310	99.29%	99.19%	98.43%	97.64%	94.10%
Black or African American alone (NH)	46	53	89	136	144	0.10%	0.12%	0.20%	0.33%	0.37%
Native American or Alaska Native alone (NH)	66	71	82	71	71	0.14%	0.16%	0.19%	0.17%	0.18%
Asian alone (NH)	99	110	116	156	154	0.21%	0.24%	0.26%	0.37%	0.40%
Native Hawaiian or Pacific Islander alone (NH)	x	x	8	12	5	x	x	0.02%	0.03%	0.01%
Other race alone (NH)	18	13	23	4	57	0.04%	0.03%	0.05%	0.01%	0.15%
Mixed race or Multiracial (NH)	x	x	218	304	1,431	x	x	0.50%	0.73%	3.71%
Hispanic or Latino (any race)	107	116	151	305	415	0.23%	0.26%	0.34%	0.73%	1.08%
Total	47,449	45,050	43,863	41,815	38,587	100.00%	100.00%	100.00%	100.00%	100.00%

=== 2020 census ===
As of the 2020 census, the county had a population of 38,587. The median age was 47.8 years. 19.4% of residents were under the age of 18 and 23.7% of residents were 65 years of age or older. For every 100 females there were 99.8 males, and for every 100 females age 18 and over there were 98.6 males age 18 and over.

The racial makeup of the county was 94.5% White, 0.4% Black or African American, 0.2% American Indian and Alaska Native, 0.4% Asian, <0.1% Native Hawaiian and Pacific Islander, 0.3% from some other race, and 4.2% from two or more races. Hispanic or Latino residents of any race comprised 1.1% of the population.

38.0% of residents lived in urban areas, while 62.0% lived in rural areas.

There were 16,618 households in the county, of which 23.4% had children under the age of 18 living in them. Of all households, 48.4% were married-couple households, 19.7% were households with a male householder and no spouse or partner present, and 24.3% were households with a female householder and no spouse or partner present. About 31.5% of all households were made up of individuals and 15.4% had someone living alone who was 65 years of age or older.

There were 21,587 housing units, of which 23.0% were vacant. Among occupied housing units, 75.6% were owner-occupied and 24.4% were renter-occupied. The homeowner vacancy rate was 1.4% and the rental vacancy rate was 8.8%.

=== 2000 census ===
As of the 2000 census, there were 43,863 people, 17,696 households, and 12,121 families residing in the county. The population density was 50 people per square mile (19 people/km^{2}). There were 23,058 housing units at an average density of 26 per square mile (10/km^{2}). The racial makeup of the county was 98.68% White, 0.21% Black or African American, 0.19% Native American, 0.27% Asian, 0.02% Pacific Islander, 0.12% from other races, and 0.52% from two or more races. 0.34% of the population were Hispanic or Latino of any race. 22.2% were of German, 12.4% Swedish, 11.2% American, 10.5% Irish, 8.8% English, 8.2% Italian, and 5.1% Polish ancestry.

There were 17,696 households, out of which 29.80% had children under the age of 18 living with them, 56.10% were married couples living together, 8.40% had a female householder with no husband present, and 31.50% were non-families. 27.20% of all households were made up of individuals, and 12.20% had someone living alone who was 65 years of age or older. The average household size was 2.42 and the average family size was 2.93.

In the county, the population was spread out, with 24.10% under the age of 18, 6.40% from 18 to 24, 27.00% from 25 to 44, 25.90% from 45 to 64, and 16.70% who were 65 years of age or older. The median age was 40 years. For every 100 females there were 96.20 males. For every 100 females age 18 and over, there were 92.80 males.

== Government ==
United States presidential election results for Warren County, Pennsylvania
Year	Republican		Democratic		Third party(ies)	
Year	No.	%	No.	%	No.	%
1888	4,329	55.76%	2,640	34.00%	795	10.24%
1892	3,838	51.91%	2,735	36.99%	821	11.10%
1896	4,846	58.70%	3,048	36.92%	361	4.37%
1900	5,609	64.88%	2,500	28.92%	536	6.20%
1904	4,737	68.57%	1,222	17.69%	949	13.74%
1908	4,672	62.03%	2,054	27.27%	806	10.70%
1912	1,564	21.55%	1,686	23.23%	4,008	55.22%
1916	3,413	47.79%	2,628	36.80%	1,100	15.40%
1920	7,791	65.07%	2,180	18.21%	2,003	16.73%
1924	8,502	70.93%	2,161	18.03%	1,323	11.04%
1928	12,077	80.21%	2,835	18.83%	144	0.96%
1932	7,872	57.24%	5,254	38.20%	627	4.56%
1936	9,440	50.30%	8,495	45.27%	832	4.43%
1940	11,016	65.02%	5,825	34.38%	101	0.60%
1944	9,276	66.96%	4,440	32.05%	137	0.99%
1948	8,378	65.38%	4,103	32.02%	333	2.60%
1952	11,555	71.55%	4,442	27.50%	153	0.95%
1956	12,145	72.94%	4,463	26.80%	43	0.26%
1960	11,611	63.81%	6,525	35.86%	59	0.32%
1964	5,965	35.81%	10,598	63.62%	94	0.56%
1968	8,889	55.67%	6,368	39.88%	711	4.45%
1972	10,018	66.05%	4,877	32.16%	272	1.79%
1976	8,508	52.62%	7,412	45.84%	250	1.55%
1980	9,165	57.37%	5,560	34.81%	1,249	7.82%
1984	10,838	62.93%	6,244	36.26%	139	0.81%
1988	8,991	56.21%	6,790	42.45%	214	1.34%
1992	6,585	35.74%	6,972	37.84%	4,869	26.42%
1996	7,056	41.34%	7,291	42.72%	2,720	15.94%
2000	9,290	52.93%	7,537	42.94%	725	4.13%
2004	10,999	57.07%	8,044	41.74%	230	1.19%
2008	9,685	51.89%	8,537	45.74%	441	2.36%
2012	10,010	57.86%	6,995	40.44%	294	1.70%
2016	12,477	67.06%	5,145	27.65%	984	5.29%
2020	14,237	68.92%	6,066	29.37%	354	1.71%
2024	14,345	68.99%	6,212	29.88%	235	1.13%

United States Senate election results for Warren County, Pennsylvania1
Year	Republican		Democratic		Third party(ies)	
Year	No.	%	No.	%	No.	%
1994	8,233	58.27%	5,386	38.12%	511	3.62%
2000	9,973	62.42%	5,565	34.83%	440	2.75%
2006	6,325	48.65%	6,677	51.35%	0	0.00%
2012	10,136	59.45%	6,432	37.72%	483	2.83%
2018	8,734	60.78%	5,390	37.51%	245	1.71%
2024	13,655	66.07%	6,415	31.04%	597	2.89%

United States Senate election results for Warren County, Pennsylvania3
Year	Republican		Democratic		Third party(ies)	
Year	No.	%	No.	%	No.	%
1992	8,471	48.55%	8,211	47.06%	766	4.39%
1998	6,784	65.63%	2,935	28.39%	618	5.98%
2004	11,400	63.20%	5,272	29.23%	1,366	7.57%
2010	7,615	62.89%	4,493	37.11%	0	0.00%
2016	12,130	66.60%	5,124	28.14%	958	5.26%
2022	10,175	63.23%	5,420	33.68%	497	3.09%

Pennsylvania Gubernatorial election results for Warren County
Year	Republican		Democratic		Third party(ies)	
Year	No.	%	No.	%	No.	%
1970	5,816	49.59%	5,710	48.68%	203	1.73%
1974	6,669	59.95%	4,285	38.52%	171	1.54%
1978	7,561	61.51%	4,584	37.29%	147	1.20%
1982	7,049	59.33%	4,716	39.69%	116	0.98%
1986	7,641	57.44%	5,527	41.55%	134	1.01%
1990	4,153	30.87%	9,260	68.84%	39	0.29%
1994	9,194	62.46%	3,643	24.75%	1,883	12.79%
1998	6,760	60.71%	2,301	20.66%	2,074	18.63%
2002	6,823	57.22%	4,823	40.45%	278	2.33%
2006	5,846	44.54%	7,278	55.46%	0	0.00%
2010	8,194	67.22%	3,996	32.78%	0	0.00%
2014	6,194	55.51%	4,965	44.49%	0	0.00%
2018	8,766	60.53%	5,447	37.61%	270	1.86%
2022	9,704	60.40%	6,032	37.55%	329	2.05%

=== Voter registration ===
As of February 21, 2022, there are 26,281 registered voters in Warren County.

Chart of Voter Registration
1. Republican (55.7%)
2. Democratic (29.1%)
3. Independent (9.00%)
4. Third Party (6.24%)
- Democratic: 7,645 (29.09%)
- Republican: 14,629 (55.66%)
- Independent: 2,366 (9.00%)
- Third Party: 1,641 (6.24%)

=== State Senate ===
- Scott E. Hutchinson, Republican, Pennsylvania's 21st Senatorial District
- Michele Brooks, Republican, Pennsylvania's 50th Senatorial District

=== State House of Representatives ===
- Kathy Rapp, Republican, Pennsylvania's 65th Representative District

=== United States House of Representatives ===
- Glenn Thompson, Republican, Pennsylvania's 15th congressional district

=== United States Senate ===
- Dave McCormick, Republican
- John Fetterman, Democrat

== Education ==
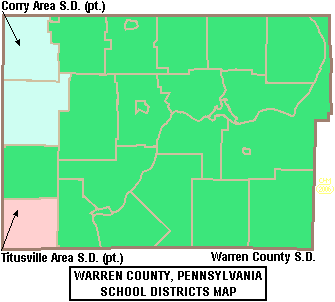
Map of Warren County, Pennsylvania School Districts

=== Public school districts ===
School districts include:

- Warren County School District
- Corry Area School District
- Titusville Area School District

=== Charter schools ===
- Tidioute Community Charter School

=== Vocational school ===
- Warren County Area Vocational Technical School

=== Private schools ===
- Beaver Valley Amish School
- Calvary Chapel Christian School
- Cozy Corners Amish School
- Early Childhood Learning Center
- Forest Amish School
- HR Rouse Children's Center
- Little Ash Parochial School, Sugar Grove
- Meadow View Amish School, Sugar Grove
- Pine Ridge School
- Railroad School
- Round Hill School
- Ruth Smith Children's Home
- St Joseph School
- Stoney Run Amish School
- Warren County Christian School

per Education Names and Addresses directory which is annually developed by the Pennsylvania Department of Education, 2016

== Communities ==
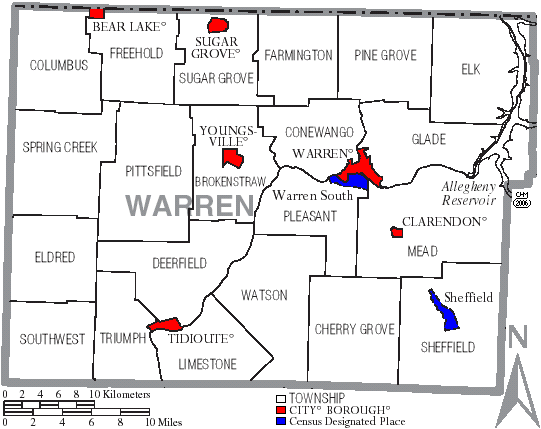
Map of Warren County, Pennsylvania with Municipal Labels showing Cities and Boroughs (red), Townships (white), and Census-designated places (blue).

Under Pennsylvania law, there are four types of incorporated municipalities: cities, boroughs, townships, and, in at most two cases, towns. The following cities, boroughs and townships are located in Warren County:

=== City ===
- Warren (county seat)

=== Boroughs ===
- Bear Lake
- Clarendon
- Sugar Grove
- Tidioute
- Youngsville

=== Townships ===
- Brokenstraw
- Cherry Grove
- Columbus
- Conewango
- Deerfield
- Eldred
- Elk
- Farmington
- Freehold
- Glade
- Limestone
- Mead
- Pine Grove
- Pittsfield
- Pleasant
- Sheffield
- Southwest
- Spring Creek
- Sugar Grove
- Triumph
- Watson

=== Census-designated places ===
Census-designated places are geographical areas designated by the U.S. Census Bureau for the purposes of compiling demographic data. They are not actual jurisdictions under Pennsylvania law.

- Columbus
- North Warren
- Russell
- Sheffield
- Starbrick

=== Unincorporated communities ===
Some communities are neither incorporated nor treated as census-designated places.

- Akeley
- Backup Corners
- Lander
- Torpedo

=== Ghost towns ===
- Cornplanter Reservation
- Corydon
- Kinzua

=== Population ranking ===
The population ranking of the following table is based on the 2010 census of Warren County.

† county seat

Rank	City/Town/etc.	Municipal type	Population (2010 Census)
1	† Warren	City	9,710
2	North Warren	CDP	1,934
3	Youngsville	Borough	1,729
4	Russell	CDP	1,408
5	Sheffield	CDP	1,132
6	Columbus	CDP	824
7	Tidioute	Borough	688
8	Sugar Grove	Borough	613
9	Starbrick	CDP	522
10	Clarendon	Borough	450
11	Bear Lake	Borough	164

== See also ==
- Hickory Creek Wilderness
- National Register of Historic Places listings in Warren County, Pennsylvania
