= Sugar Grove, Pennsylvania =

Borough in Pennsylvania, US

Sugar Grove Seneca: Jöëdzë́'šo
- Borough
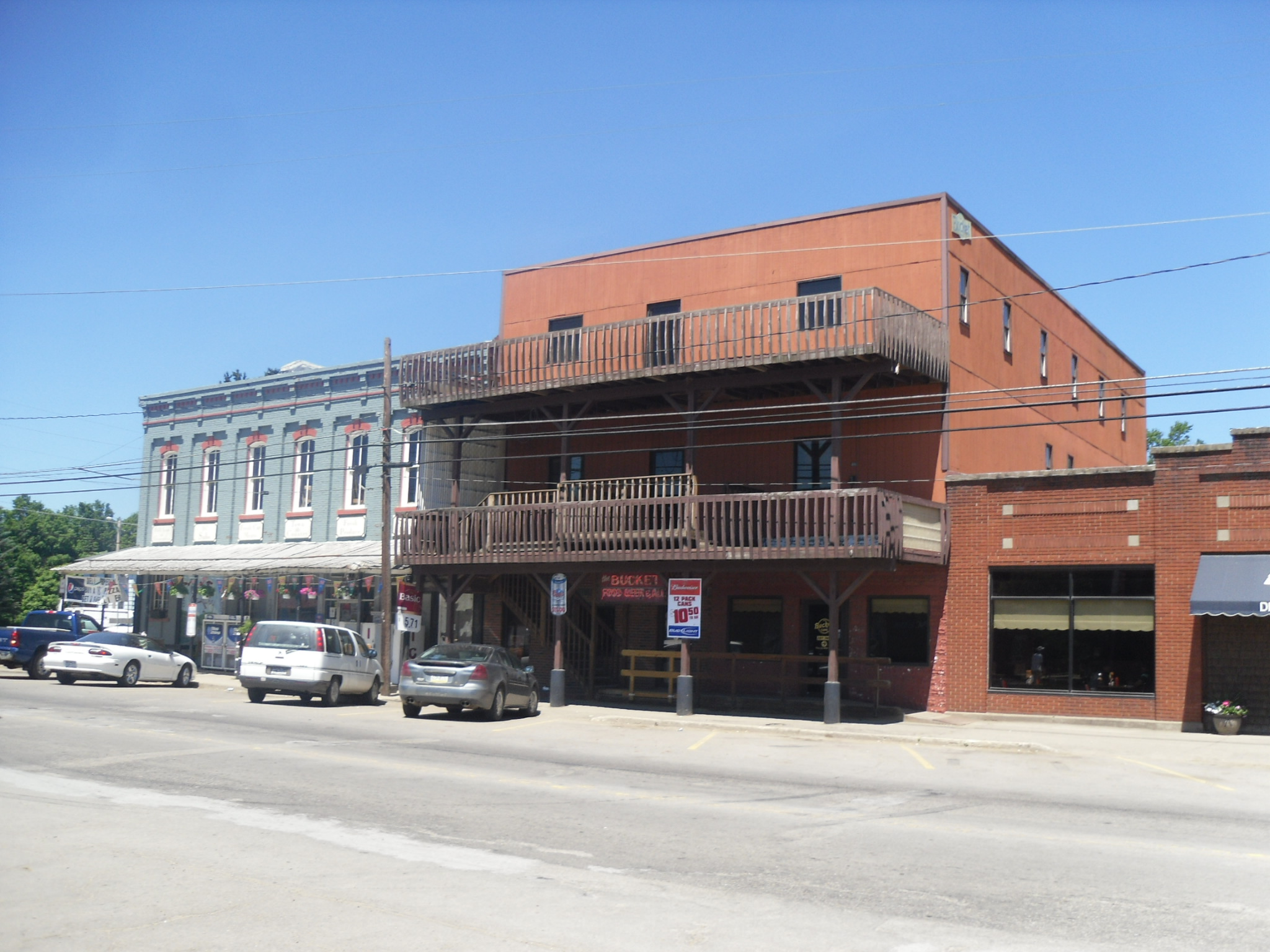
- Etymology: the surrounding maple forests; Seneca: "where the lands have slumped".
- Location of Sugar Grove in Warren County, Pennsylvania.

- Location of Sugar Grove in Pennsylvania
- Coordinates: 41°58′56″N 79°20′30″W
- Country: United States
- State: Pennsylvania
- County: Warren
- Founded: 1797

Area
  - Total: 1.12 sq mi (2.90 km^{2})
  - Land: 1.12 sq mi (2.90 km^{2})
  - Water: 0 sq mi (0.00 km^{2})

Population (2010)
  - Total: 614
  - Estimate (2019): 573
  - Density: 511.2/sq mi (197.38/km^{2})
- Time zone: UTC-4 (EST)
  - Summer (DST): UTC-5 (EDT)
- ZIP code: 16350
- Area code: 814
- FIPS code: 42-75024
- Website: www.sugargrovepa.com

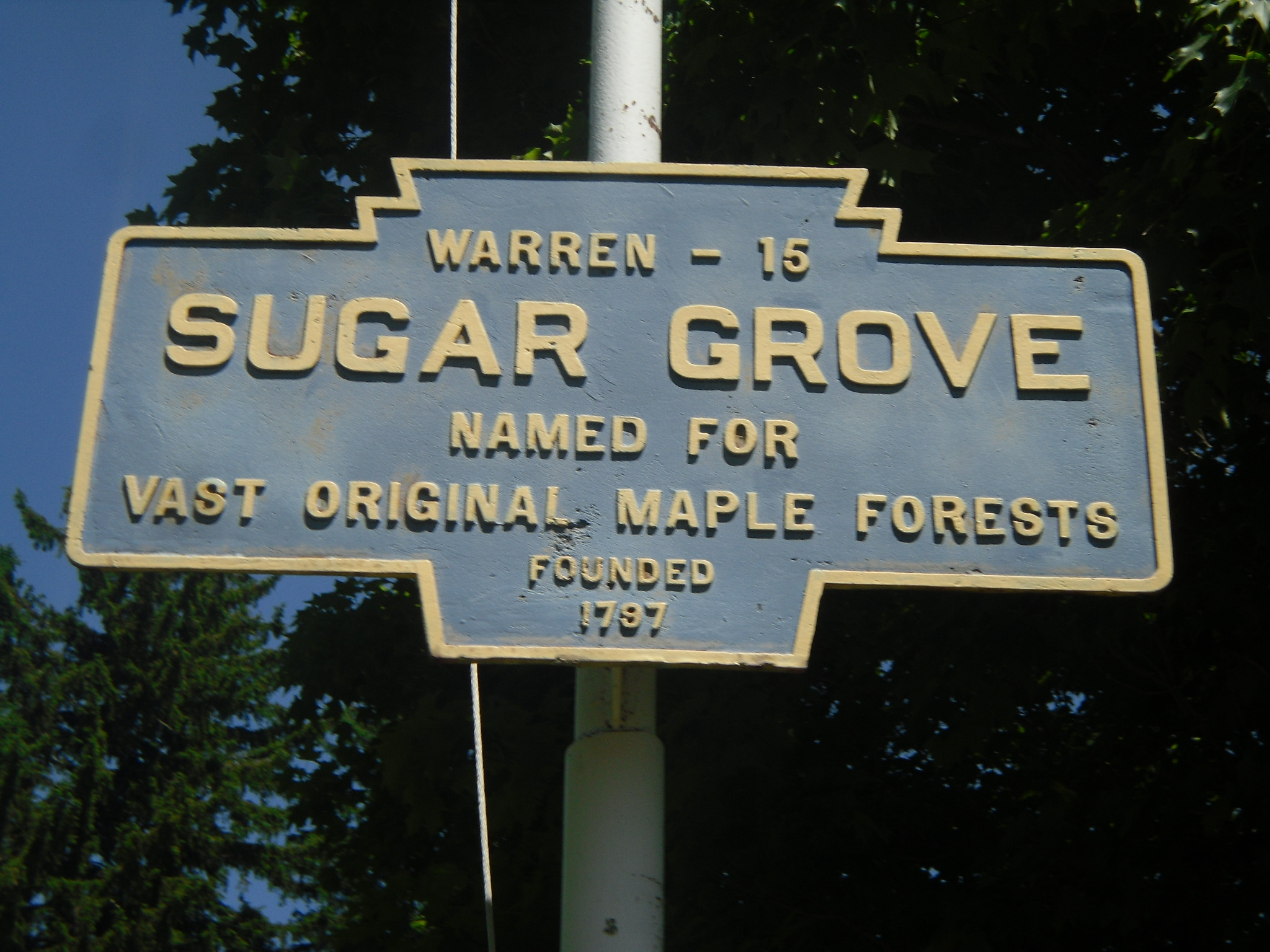
Keystone Marker for Sugar Grove

Sugar Grove (Seneca: Jöëdzë́'šo) is a borough in Sugar Grove Township, Warren County, Pennsylvania, United States. As of the 2020 census, Sugar Grove had a population of 564.

== Geography ==
Sugar Grove is located at 41°58′56″N 79°20′30″W (41.982166, -79.341588).

According to the United States Census Bureau, the borough has a total area of 1.1 square miles (2.8 km^{2}), all land.

== Demographics ==
Historical population
Census	Pop.	Note	%±
1850	1,523		—
1860	1,646		8.1%
1870	1,729		5.0%
1880	1,861		7.6%
1890	292		−84.3%
1900	334		14.4%
1910	459		37.4%
1920	371		−19.2%
1930	445		19.9%
1940	440		−1.1%
1950	520		18.2%
1960	636		22.3%
1970	701		10.2%
1980	630		−10.1%
1990	604		−4.1%
2000	613		1.5%
2010	614		0.2%
2020	564		−8.1%

As of the census of 2000, there were 613 people, 232 households, and 180 families residing in the borough. The population density was 550.2 people per square mile (212.4 people/km^{2}). There were 250 housing units at an average density of 224.4 per square mile (86.6/km^{2}). The racial makeup of the borough was 99.51% White, 0.16% African American, and 0.33% from two or more races. Hispanic or Latino of any race were 0.16% of the population.

There were 232 households, out of which 36.6% had children under the age of 18 living with them, 61.6% were married couples living together, 11.2% had a female householder with no husband present, and 22.4% were non-families. 19.8% of all households were made up of individuals, and 13.4% had someone living alone who was 65 years of age or older. The average household size was 2.64 and the average family size was 3.00.

In the borough the population was spread out, with 27.9% under the age of 18, 7.8% from 18 to 24, 27.2% from 25 to 44, 21.2% from 45 to 64, and 15.8% who were 65 years of age or older. The median age was 37 years. For every 100 females there were 88.0 males. For every 100 females age 18 and over, there were 81.1 males.

The median income for a household in the borough was $36,125, and the median income for a family was $41,964. Males had a median income of $29,519 versus $21,607 for females. The per capita income for the borough was $16,896. About 6.7% of families and 8.2% of the population were below the poverty line, including 11.1% of those under age 18 and 4.0% of those age 65 or over.

== History ==
On 17–18 June 1854, an anti-slavery convention of abolitionists was held in Sugar Grove at the farm of James Younie on the western end of the village. Frederick Douglass, Lewis Clarke, and Jermain Loguen gave speeches during the weekend event. The William and Sarah Storum family of nearby Busti, New York organized the convention and likely provided accommodations for the speakers. Local abolitionist Cynthia Catlin Miller hosted Douglass for tea.

There is a local celebration of the June 1854 anti-slavery convention that likewise recalls the Juneteenth holiday. There were fugitives that Joah Carter hid during the Underground Railroad times from the Corry, Pennsylvania area.

== Education ==
It is in the Warren County School District.
