= Corydon =

Corydon may refer to:

== Literature ==
- Corydon (character), a stock name for a shepherd in pastorals
- Corydon (book), an early 20th-century book by André Gide

== People ==
- Bent Corydon (born 1942), American author and journalist
- Bjarne Corydon (born 1973), Danish former politician and Finance Minister
- Corydon Beckwith (1823–1890), American jurist and lawyer
- Corydon Bell (1894–1980), American author of children's books
- Corydon Partlow Brown (1848–1891), Canadian politician
- Corydon M. Wassell (1884–1958), U.S. Navy physician and recipient of the Navy Cross

== Places in the United States ==
- Corydon, Indiana, a town
  - Corydon Historic District
- Corydon, Iowa, a city
- Corydon, Kentucky, a home rule-class city
- Corydon Township (disambiguation)

== Other uses ==
- Corydon Avenue, a segment of Winnipeg Route 95 in Winnipeg, Manitoba, Canada
- Corydon (bird), a genus of broadbill containing a single species, the dusky broadbill
- Battle of Corydon, in the American Civil War

== See also ==
- Croydon (disambiguation)
