= Kinzua =

Kinzua may refer to:

== Communities ==
- Kinzua, Oregon, a ghost town in Wheeler County
- Kinzua, Pennsylvania, in Warren County [under the Allegheny Reservoir (aka, Kinzua Lake) since 1965]
- Kinzua Beach, Pennsylvania, in Warren County
- Kinzua Heights, Pennsylvania, in Warren County
- Kinzua Township, Warren County, Pennsylvania

== Other ==
- Kinzua Creek, a tributary of the Allegheny River in Pennsylvania
- Kinzua Bridge State Park, located in McKean County, Pennsylvania
  - Kinzua Bridge, a former railway bridge located in the above state park
- Kinzua Dam, a U.S. Army Corps of Engineers dam on the Allegheny River in Pennsylvania
- Allegheny Reservoir, also known as Kinzua Lake, formed by the Kinzua Dam
