= Croydon (disambiguation) =

Croydon is a district in the London Borough of Croydon, England.

It may also refer to:

== Places ==
=== Australia ===
- One of two places in Sydney in the state of New South Wales:
  - Croydon, New South Wales
  - Croydon Park, New South Wales
- Croydon, Queensland, a town in the north of Queensland
  - Shire of Croydon, a local government area for the Queensland town of Croydon
  - Town of Croydon, a former local government area for the Queensland town of Croydon
- One of three places in Adelaide in the state of South Australia:
  - Croydon, South Australia
  - Croydon Park, South Australia
  - West Croydon, South Australia
- One of a number of places in the City of Maroondah, an eastern suburb of the city of Melbourne, in the state of Victoria:
  - Croydon, Victoria
    - Croydon railway station, Melbourne
  - Croydon Hills, Victoria
  - Croydon North, Victoria
  - Croydon South, Victoria
- A pastoral lease in the Goldfields of Western Australia:
  - Croydon Station

=== Canada ===
- Croydon, Ontario, a hamlet in Eastern Ontario

=== New Zealand ===
- Croydon Bush, in Southland, New Zealand

=== South Africa ===
- Croydon, Kempton Park, a suburb in Gauteng
- Croydon, Cape Town, a suburb in Cape Town

=== United Kingdom ===
- London Borough of Croydon
- County Borough of Croydon
  - Croydon, the major town in the borough
  - South Croydon, a district just south of the centre of Croydon
  - Croydon (UK Parliament constituency)
  - Croydon South (historic UK Parliament constituency)
  - Croydon South (UK Parliament constituency)
  - Croydon North (UK Parliament constituency)
  - Croydon Central (UK Parliament constituency)
  - Croydon Airport, closed in 1959
  - Croydon Pirates Baseball Club
- Croydon, Cambridgeshire, a village in Cambridgeshire

=== United States ===
- Croydon, New Hampshire, a town in Sullivan County
- Croydon, Pennsylvania, a town in Bucks County
- Croydon, Utah, a town in Morgan County

== Other uses ==
- Croydon facelift, a hairstyle
- Croydon station (disambiguation), stations of the name
- Electoral district of Croydon in Australia:
  - Electoral district of Croydon (South Australia), an electorate of the South Australian House of Assembly
  - Electoral district of Croydon (New South Wales), a former electorate of the New South Wales Legislative Assembly
  - Electoral district of Croydon (Queensland), a former electorate of the Queensland Legislative Assembly

== See also ==
- Akroydon, model housing village in West Yorkshire, England
- Corydon (disambiguation)
