= Kinzua Creek =

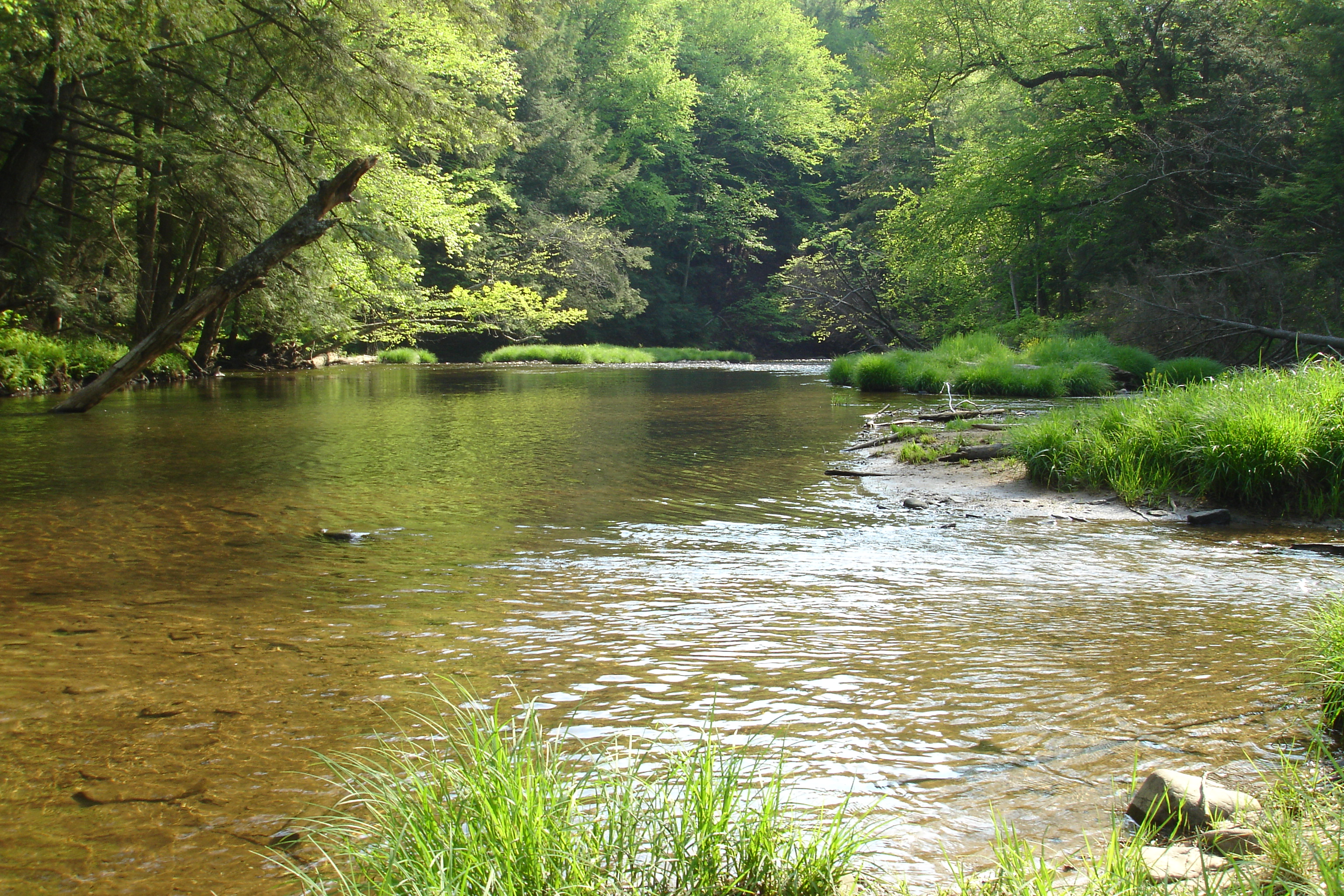
- Kinzua Creek in the Allegheny National Forest near the Allegheny Reservoir

- Location of the mouth of Kinzua Creek in Pennsylvania
- Etymology: Tgëdzó:a’ (tgenh-joh-wawh!), Seneca meaning "fish speared there"

Location
- Country: United States
- State: Pennsylvania
- County: McKean

Physical characteristics
- Source
  - location: Cyclone, McKean County, Pennsylvania
  - coordinates: 41°50′8″N 78°35′13″W
  - elevation: 2,220 ft (680 m)
- Mouth: Allegheny River
  - location: Allegheny Reservoir, McKean County, Pennsylvania
  - coordinates: 41°51′29″N 78°57′13″W
  - elevation: 1,328 ft (405 m)
- Length: 26.5 mi (42.6 km)
- Basin size: 86 sq mi (220 km^{2})

Kinzua Creek /ˈkɪnzuː/ is a 26.5-mile (42.6 km) tributary of the Allegheny River that is located in McKean County, Pennsylvania in the United States.

== Geography ==
The upper reaches of the creek pass through Kinzua Bridge State Park, where the creek was spanned by the Kinzua Viaduct until a tornado destroyed the viaduct in 2003.

Kinzua Creek, named for a settlement of the Seneca people, joins the Allegheny Reservoir 10 miles (16 km) upstream of the city of Warren, a few miles upstream of the Kinzua Dam on the Allegheny River. The location is also the former location of Kinzua, an unincorporated community that was wiped out as a result of the construction of the Kinzua Dam; it previously formed the boundary between Kinzua and (West) Corydon before both communities were dissolved in the 1960s.

== See also ==
- List of rivers of Pennsylvania
- List of tributaries of the Allegheny River
