= Mead Township, Pennsylvania =

Township in Pennsylvania, United States

Coordinates: 41°50′00″N 78°58′59″W

Mead Township
- Township
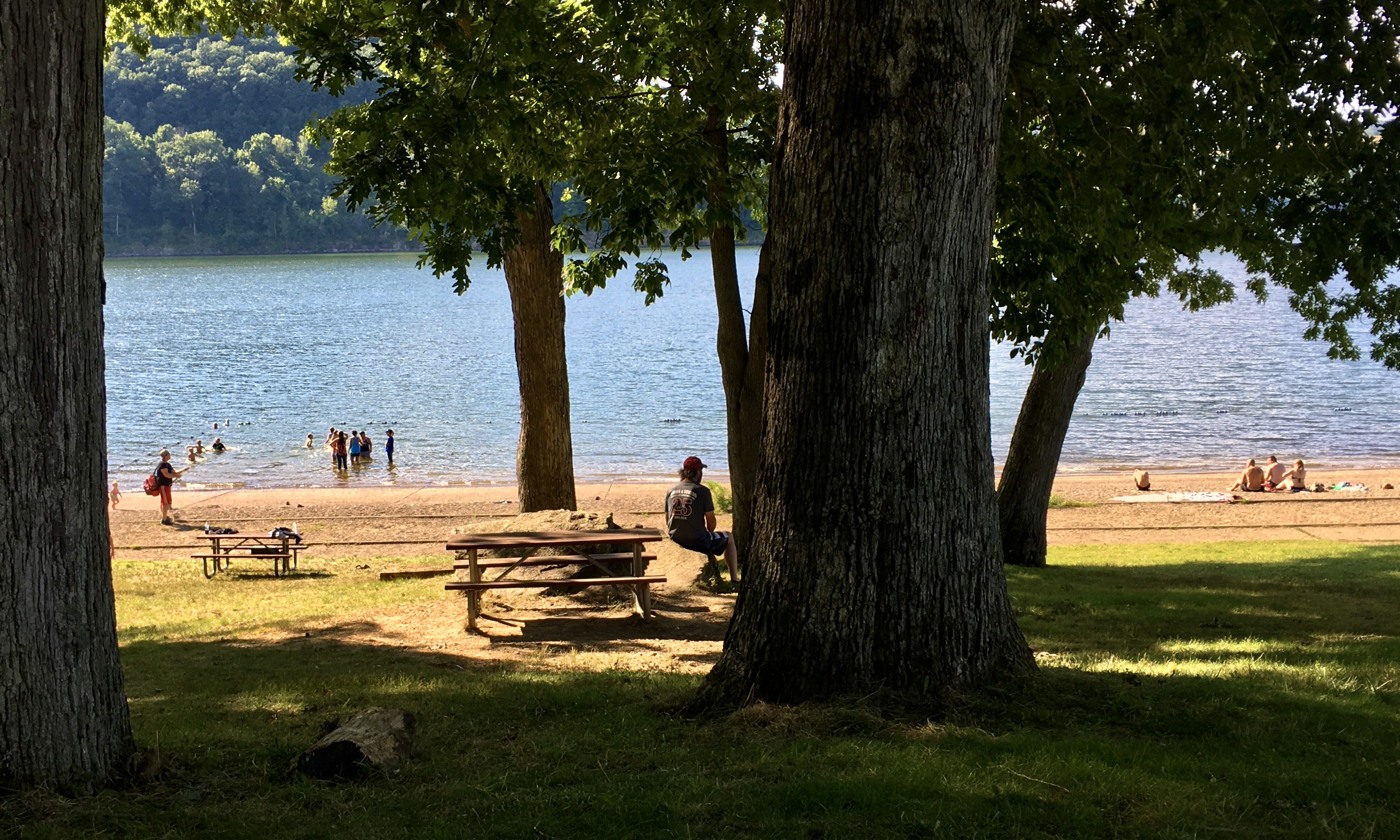
- Kinzua Beach Recreation Area on the Allegheny Reservoir

- Flag

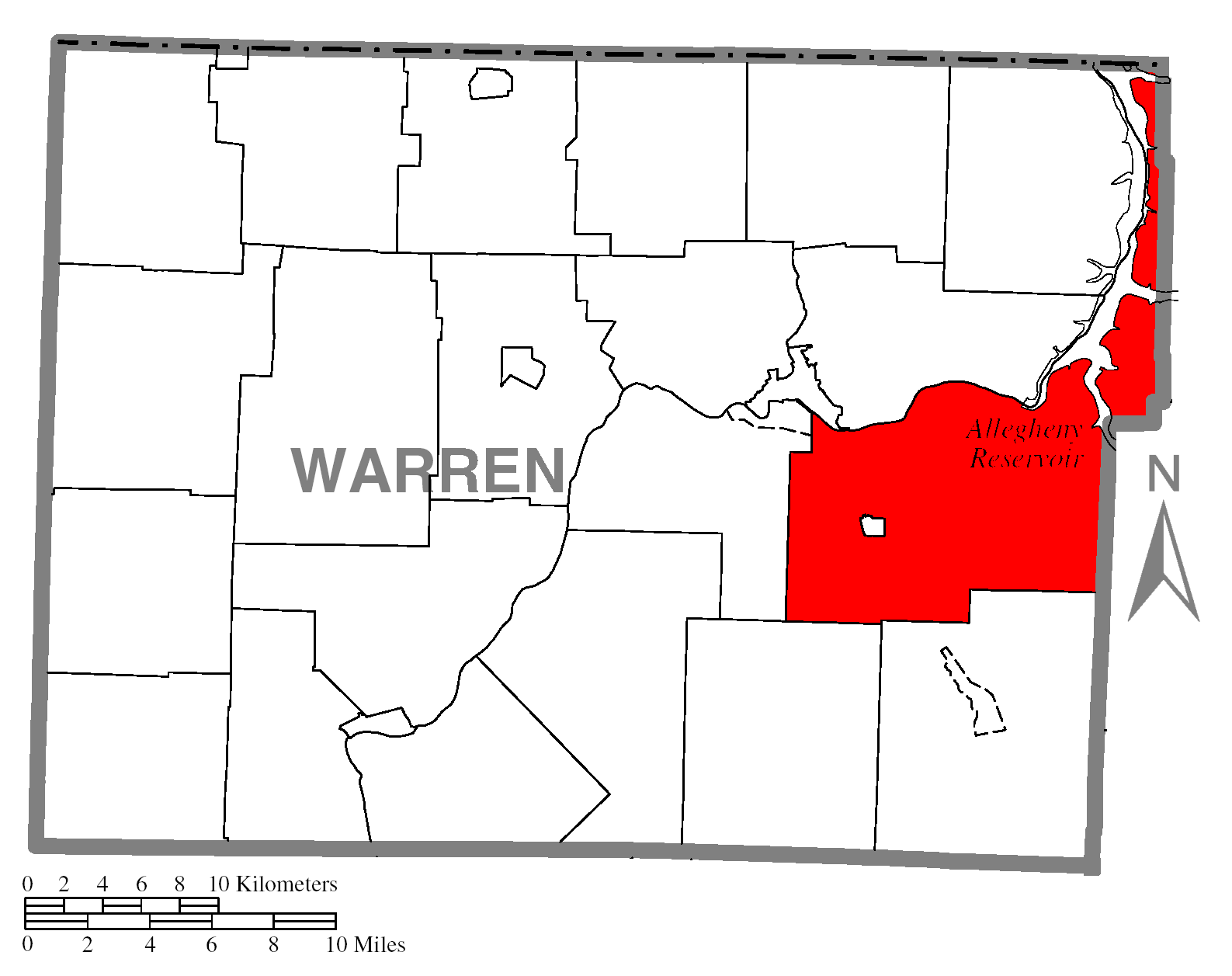
- Location of Mead Township in Warren County

- Location of Warren County in Pennsylvania
- Country: United States
- State: Pennsylvania
- County: Warren

Area
  - Total: 85.64 sq mi (221.80 km^{2})
  - Land: 78.59 sq mi (203.54 km^{2})
  - Water: 7.05 sq mi (18.26 km^{2})

Population (2020)
  - Total: 1,298
  - Estimate (2024): 1,266
  - Density: 16.9/sq mi (6.51/km^{2})
- Time zone: UTC-4 (EST)
  - Summer (DST): UTC-5 (EDT)
- Area code: 814
- FIPS code: 42-123-48272

Mead Township is a township in Warren County, Pennsylvania, United States. The population was 1,298 at the 2020 census, down from 1,386 at the 2010 census and 1,555 at the 2000 census.

== History ==
Mead Township was created on June 7, 1847, from parts of Sheffield, Kinzua, and Pleasant Townships. It was named for the early 19th-century settler, Darius Mead.

In the early 1960s, construction began on the Kinzua Dam and a few small communities on the banks of the Allegheny River were evacuated and flooded. The nearby townships of Kinzua and Corydon, having greatly reduced populations, were merged into Mead in 1963 and 1964, respectively.

== Geography ==
According to the United States Census Bureau, the township has a total area of 85.64 square miles (221.8 km^{2}), of which 78.59 square miles (203.5 km^{2}) is land and 7.05 square miles (18.3 km^{2}) (8.45%) is water. It is the largest township by area in Warren County.

The Allegheny Reservoir forms the entire western border of Mead Township's northern arm.

The Borough of Clarendon is enclaved within the township.

== Demographics ==
=== 2020 census ===
As of the census of 2020, there were 1,296 people, 612 households, and 364 families residing in the township.

=== 2000 census ===
Historical population
Census	Pop.	Note	%±
2000	1,555		—
2010	1,386		−10.9%
2020	1,298		−6.3%
2024 (est.)	1,266		−2.5%
U.S. Decennial Census

At the census of 2000, there were 1,555 people, 649 households and 456 families residing in the township. The population density was 19.8 per square mile (7.6/km^{2}). There were 878 housing units at an average density of 11.2 per square mile (4.3/km^{2}). The racial make-up of the township was 99.10% White, 0.06% African American, 0.06% Asian, 0.06% Pacific Islander and 0.71% from two or more races. Hispanic or Latino of any race were 0.26% of the population.

There were 649 households, of which 27.4% had children under the age of 18 living with them, 57.6% were married couples living together, 7.4% had a female householder with no husband present and 29.7% were non-families. 25.9% of all households were made up of individuals and 11.2% had someone living alone who was 65 years of age or older. The average household size was 2.39 and the average family size was 2.84.

22.3% of the population were under the age of 18, 6.8% from 18 to 24, 27.0% from 25 to 44, 27.7% from 45 to 64 and 16.3% were 65 years of age or older. The median age was 42 years. For every 100 females, there were 101.7 males. For every 100 females age 18 and over, there were 96.9 males.

The median household income was $37,443 and the median family income was $41,875. Males had a median income of $32,109 and females $24,896. The per capita income was $17,792. About 6.5% of families and 11.0% of the population were below the poverty line, including 17.5% of those under age 18 and 3.3% of those age 65 or over.
