= Ferroxyl indicator solution =

Chemical reagent

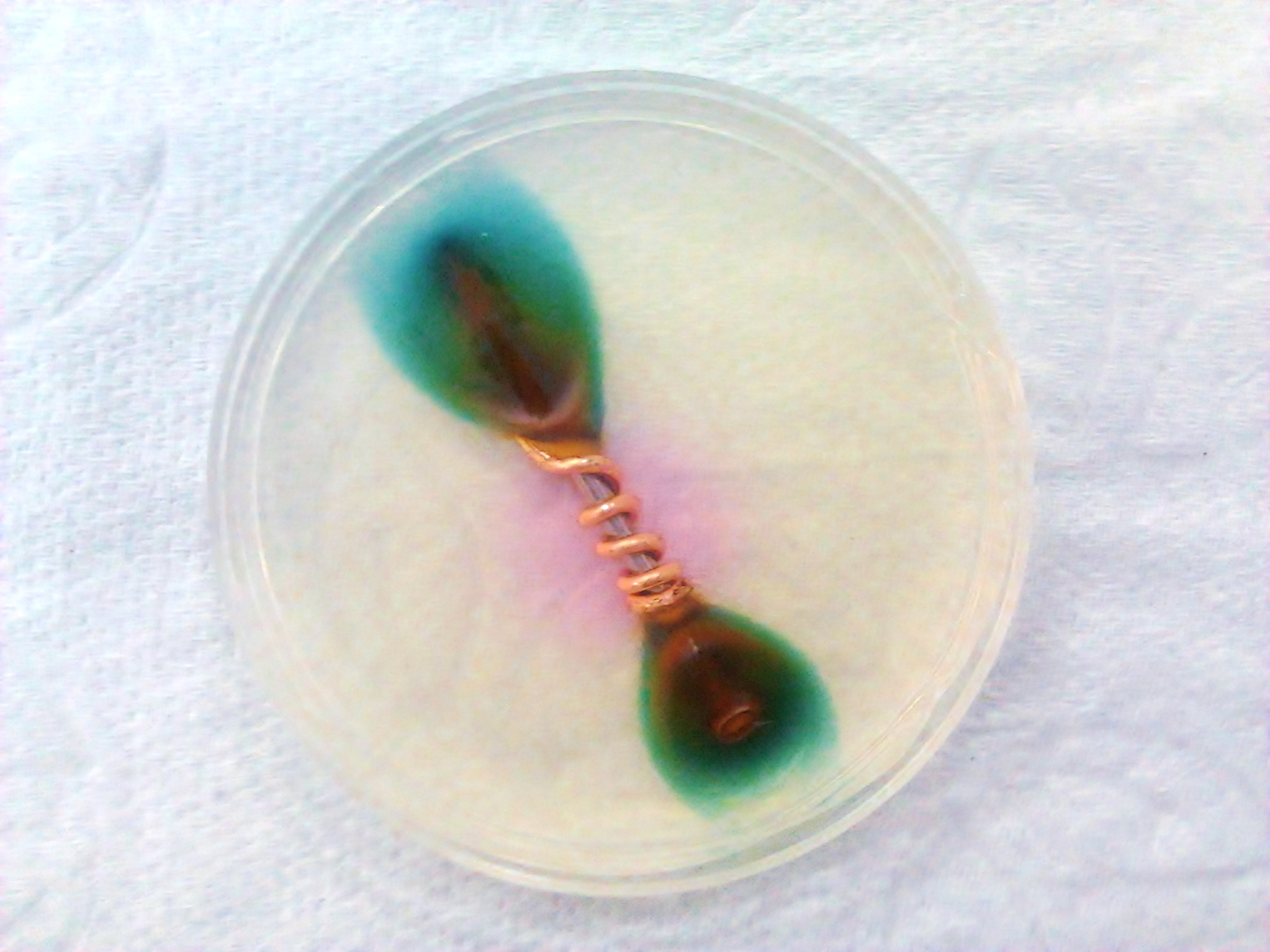
Corrosion of iron nail with coiled copper in medium with ferroxyl indicator

Ferroxyl indicator, or rust indicator, is a solution containing potassium hexacyanoferrate(III) and phenolphthalein. It turns blue in the presence of Fe^{2+} ions, and pink in the presence of hydroxide (OH^{−}) ions. It can be used to detect metal oxidation, and is often used to detect rusting in various situations. Sodium chloride may also be included in the solution for higher rate of corrosion.

== Formula ==
It can be prepared by dissolving 10g sodium chloride and 1g potassium hexacyanoferrate(III) in distilled water, adding 10 cm^{3} phenolphthalein indicator, then making up to 500 cm^{3} with distilled water.
