= Corydon Township =

Corydon Township may refer to the following townships in the United States:

- Corydon Township, Wayne County, Iowa
- Corydon Township, McKean County, Pennsylvania
- Corydon Township, Warren County, Pennsylvania
