= Kinzua, Oregon =

- Ghost town
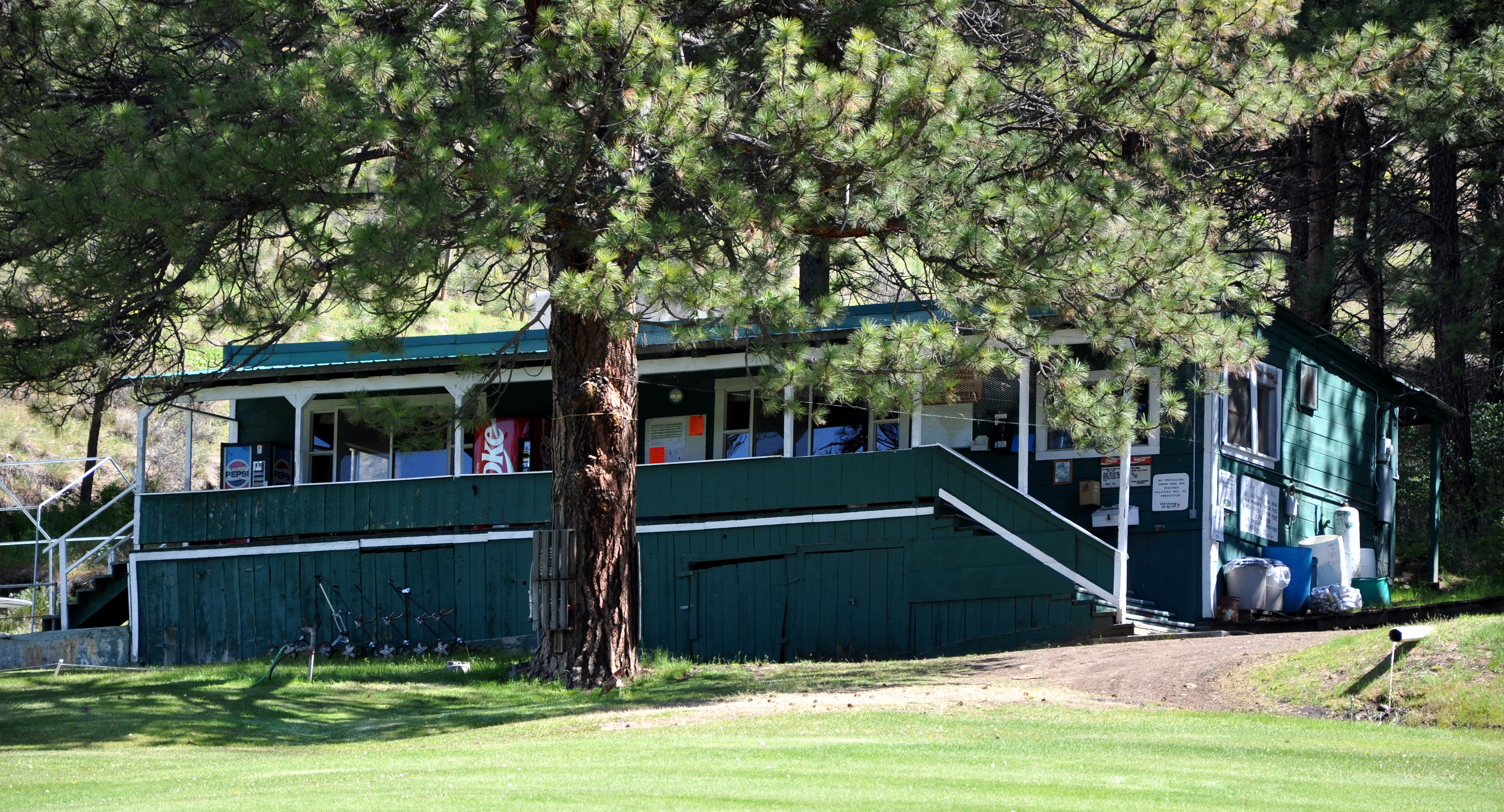
- Clubhouse of the Kinzua Hills Golf Club in 2011

- Location within the state of Oregon
- Coordinates: 44°59′22″N 120°03′32″W
- Country: United States
- State: Oregon
- County: Wheeler
- Named for: Kinzua, Pennsylvania
- Elevation: 3,402 ft (1,037 m)
- Time zone: UTC-8 (PST)
  - Summer (DST): UTC-7 (PDT)
- ZIP code: 97830 (Fossil Post Office box)
- Area code: 541
- Coordinates and elevation from United States Geological Survey

Kinzua is a ghost town or former town site in Wheeler County, Oregon, United States. It existed as a company town from 1927 to 1978. Kinzua lies directly east of Fossil and uses a Fossil mailing address.

The community was founded by Pennsylvania lumberman Edward D. Wetmore to support the sawmill operations of the Kinzua Pine Mills Company, that was named for the Kinzua Township in Pennsylvania. At one time Kinzua was the most populous community in Wheeler County and 330 people worked at the mill.

In 1929, the company built the Condon, Kinzua & Southern Railroad to ship forest products from the mill to Condon, 30 miles (48 km) to the north. From Condon a Union Pacific feeder line went north to Arlington on the Columbia River. Through 1952, the Kinzua & Southern carried mail and passengers via a self-powered rail bus called "The Goose". The line closed entirely in 1976.

In 1965, Kinzua included 125 homes, a community hall, church, library, store, and the golf course. When the mill closed in 1978, the buildings were removed and the townsite was planted with trees, mainly ponderosa pine. The six-hole golf course of the Kinzua Hills Golf Club occupies part of the site. The nearby Kinzua landing strip and Kinzua Mountain retain the name as well.

== See also ==
- List of ghost towns in Oregon
