= Corydon, Kentucky =

- City
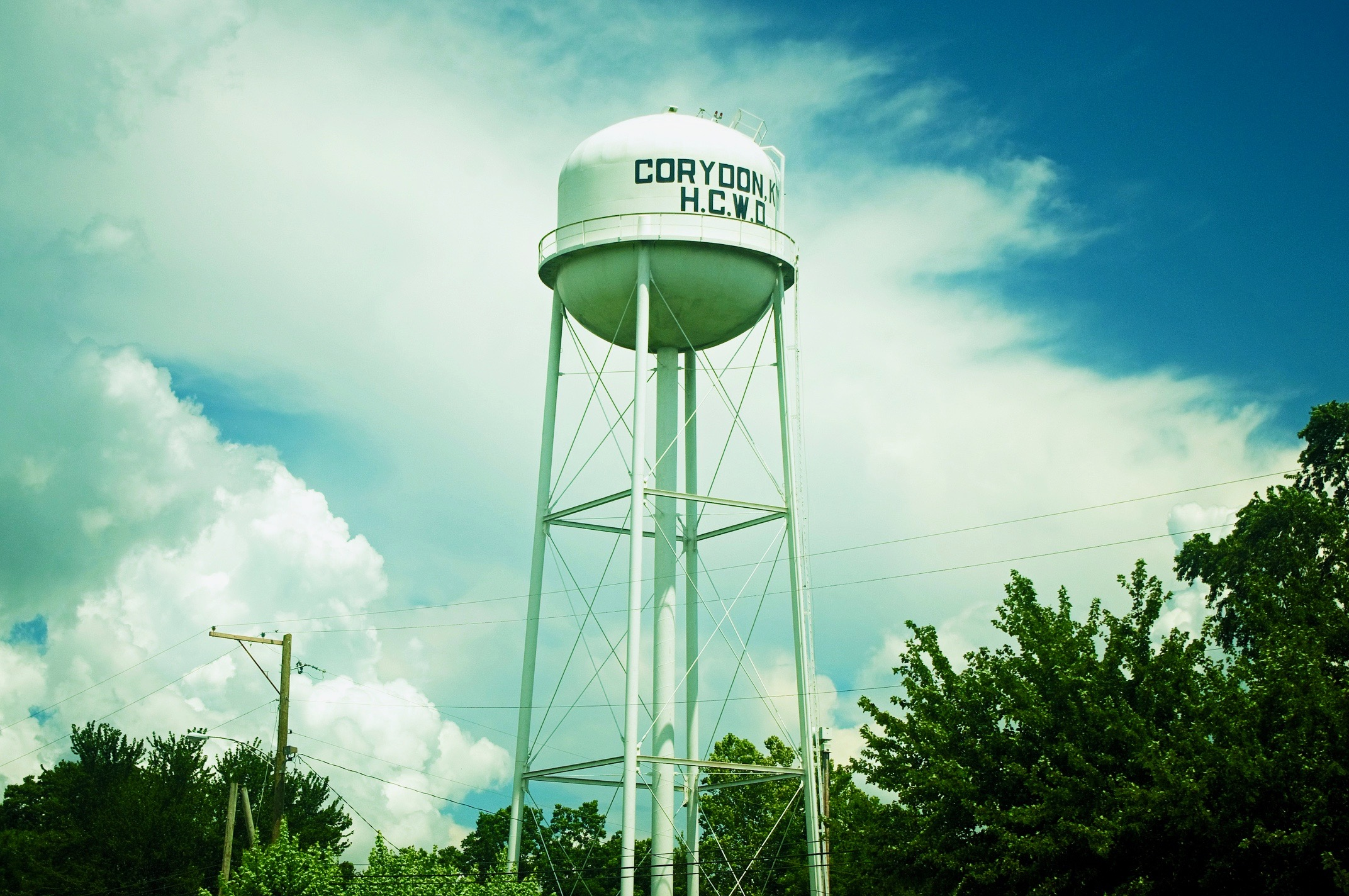
- Water tower

- Location of Corydon in Henderson County, Kentucky.
- Coordinates: 37°44′29″N 87°42′24″W
- Country: United States
- State: Kentucky
- County: Henderson

Area
  - Total: 0.54 sq mi (1.41 km^{2})
  - Land: 0.54 sq mi (1.41 km^{2})
  - Water: 0 sq mi (0.00 km^{2})
- Elevation: 456 ft (139 m)

Population (2020)
  - Total: 737
  - Density: 1,357.7/sq mi (524.22/km^{2})
- Time zone: UTC-6 (Central (CST))
  - Summer (DST): UTC-5 (CDT)
- ZIP code: 42406
- Area codes: 270 & 364
- FIPS code: 21-17686
- GNIS feature ID: 0490133
- Website: www.corydonkentucky.com

Corydon (/ˈkɒrɪdən/) is a home rule-class city and former coal town in Henderson County, Kentucky, United States. As of the 2020 census, Corydon had a population of 737.

== History ==
Settled in 1849 by the Dorsey brothers, John and William, the city was named by John's wife, Patsy, for the hero of the 19th-century song "Pastoral Elegy" (who was himself named for a lovesick shepherd in Virgil's Eclogues). Corydon incorporated in 1867.

== Geography ==
Corydon is located in western Henderson County at 37°44′29″N 87°42′24″W (37.741459, -87.706774). U.S. Route 60 is Corydon's Main Street, leading northeast 9 miles (14 km) to Henderson, the county seat, and southwest 13 miles (21 km) to Morganfield.

According to the United States Census Bureau, Corydon has a total area of 0.54 square miles (1.4 km^{2}), all land.

== Demographics ==
Historical population
| Census | Pop. | Note | %± |
|---|---|---|---|
| 1870 | 247 | | — |
| 1880 | 544 | | 120.2% |
| 1890 | 777 | | 42.8% |
| 1900 | 782 | | 0.6% |
| 1910 | 942 | | 20.5% |
| 1920 | 1,019 | | 8.2% |
| 1930 | 721 | | −29.2% |
| 1940 | 787 | | 9.2% |
| 1950 | 742 | | −5.7% |
| 1960 | 746 | | 0.5% |
| 1970 | 880 | | 18.0% |
| 1980 | 874 | | −0.7% |
| 1990 | 790 | | −9.6% |
| 2000 | 744 | | −5.8% |
| 2010 | 720 | | −3.2% |
| 2020 | 737 | | 2.4% |
U.S. Decennial Census

As of the census of 2000, there were 744 people, 271 households, and 204 families residing in the city. The population density was 1,393.6 inhabitants per square mile (538.1/km^{2}). There were 295 housing units at an average density of 552.6 per square mile (213.4/km^{2}). The racial makeup of the city was 90.46% White, 9.01% Black or African American, 0.13% from other races, and 0.40% from two or more races. Hispanic or Latino of any race were 0.40% of the population.

There were 271 households, out of which 34.3% had children under the age of 18 living with them, 63.5% were married couples living together, 8.1% had a female householder with no husband present, and 24.7% were non-families. 20.3% of all households were made up of individuals, and 9.6% had someone living alone who was 65 years of age or older. The average household size was 2.75 and the average family size was 3.18.

In the city, the population was spread out, with 28.5% under the age of 18, 8.5% from 18 to 24, 29.2% from 25 to 44, 21.6% from 45 to 64, and 12.2% who were 65 years of age or older. The median age was 34 years. For every 100 females, there were 86.9 males. For every 100 females age 18 and over, there were 93.5 males.

The median income for a household in the city was $36,333, and the median income for a family was $34,773. Males had a median income of $27,019 versus $20,682 for females. The per capita income for the city was $12,790. About 3.6% of families and 6.6% of the population were below the poverty line, including 3.4% of those under age 18 and 9.1% of those age 65 or over.

== Notable people ==
- Happy Chandler, 44th and 49th governor of Kentucky; Commissioner of Baseball from 1945 to 1951
- Frank Ramsey, former NBA player and coach
