= Croydon station =

Croydon station may refer to:

In Australia:

- Croydon Station, a pastoral lease and sheep station in the Pilbarra area of Western Australia
- Croydon railway station, Adelaide, Australia
- Croydon railway station, Melbourne, Australia
- Croydon railway station, Queensland, a stop on the Gulflander train
- Croydon railway station, Sydney, Australia
- West Croydon railway station, Adelaide, Australia

In the United Kingdom:

- East Croydon station, the main railway station in Croydon, London
- West Croydon station, in Croydon, London
- South Croydon railway station, in Croydon, London

In the United States:

- Croydon station (SEPTA), a SEPTA Regional Rail station in Croydon, Pennsylvania, USA

== See also ==
- Croydon (disambiguation)
