= Corydon (character) =

Stock name for a herdsman in ancient Greek pastoral poems and fables

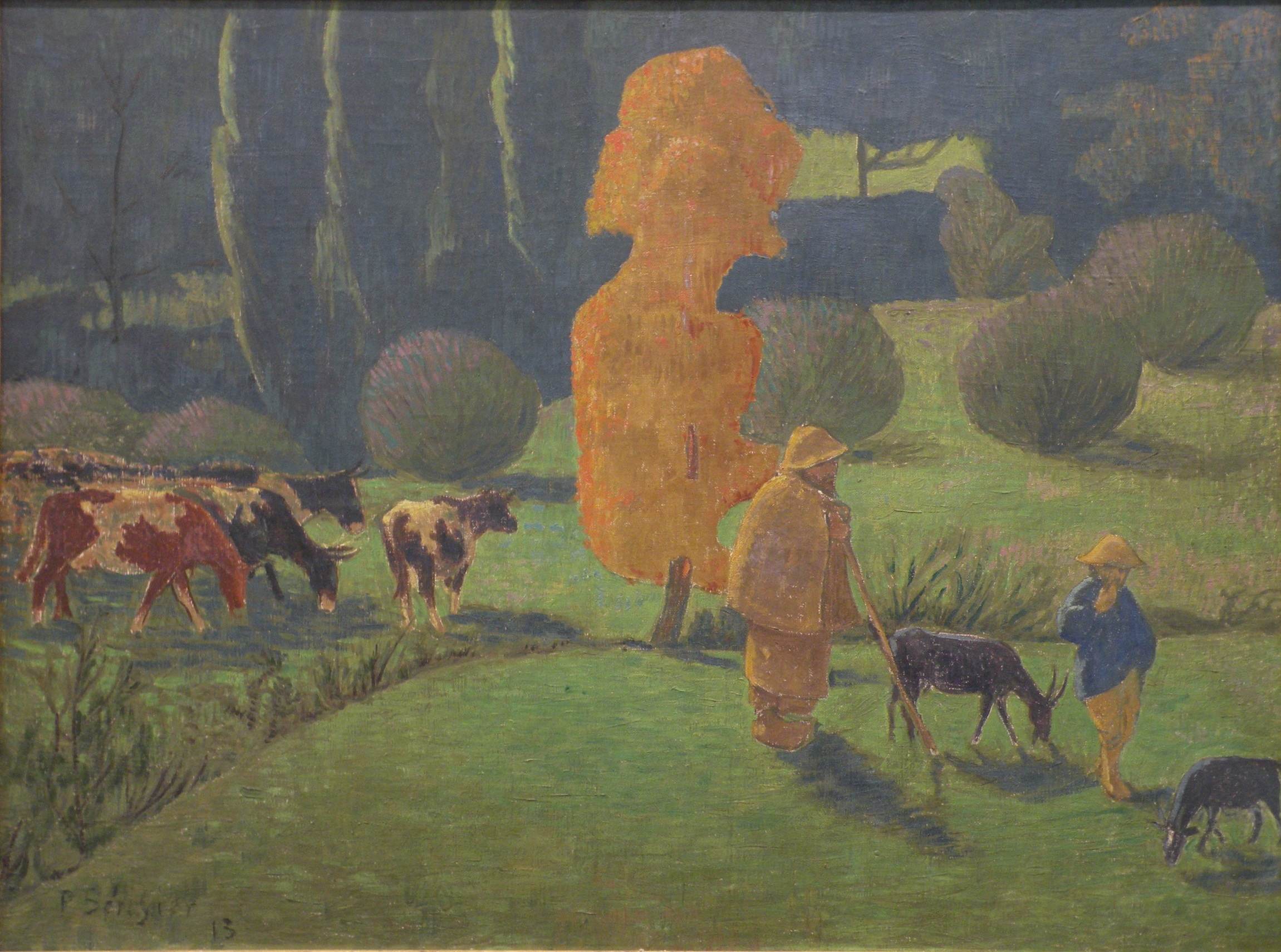
Corydon the Shepherd by Paul Sérusier. Museum of modern art André Malraux - MuMa, Le Havre.

Corydon (Greek Κορύδων Korúdōn, probably related to κόρυδος kórudos "lark") is a stock name for a herdsman in ancient Greek pastoral poems and fables, and in much later European literature.

== Ancient ==
Corydon features in the fourth Idyll of the Syracusan poet Theocritus (c. 300 – c. 250 BC), where he is found herding some cows belonging to a certain Aegon. The name was used by the Latin poets Siculus and, more significantly, Virgil. In the second of Virgil's Eclogues, Corydon is a goatherd who loves a boy called Alexis.

Corydon is the name of a character that features heavily in the Eclogues of Calpurnius Siculus. Some scholars believe that this Corydon represents Calpurnius himself, or at least his "poetic voice".

== Early-modern ==
Corydon is mentioned in Edmund Spenser's The Faerie Queen as a shepherd in Book VI, Canto X. In this section he is portrayed as a coward who fails to come to the aid of Pastorell when she is being pursued by a tiger.

The name appears in poem number 17 ("My flocks feed not, my ewes breed not") of The Passionate Pilgrim, an anthology of poetry first published in 1599 and attributed on the title page of the collection to Shakespeare. This poem appeared the following year in another collection, England's Helicon, where it was attributed to "Ignoto" (Latin for "Unknown"). Circumstantial evidence points to a possible authorship by Richard Barnfield, whose first published work, The Affectionate Shepherd, though dealing with the unrequited love of Daphnis for Ganymede, was in fact, as Barnfield stated later, an expansion of Virgil's second Eclogue which dealt with the love of Corydon for Alexis.

Nicholas Breton's pastoral poem Phyllis and Corydon is written from the point of view of Corydon and was also printed in England's Helicon.

John Wilbye's The Second Set of Madrigales for 3-6 Voices, 1598, contains the song Stay, Corydon, thou swain about Corydon's unrequited love for a nymph.

Corydon and Thyrsis appear in Henry Needler's poem, "A Pastoral", first published in 1724.

== Modern ==
Corydon is the name of a shepherd in a song titled "Pastoral Elegy". The town of Corydon, Indiana is named after the shepherd of that song.

Corydon and Thyrsis are a pair of shepherds in Edna St. Vincent Millay's 1920 play Aria da Capo.

Corydon is the title of a 1924 book by André Gide in the form of Socratic dialogues arguing for the naturalness and morality of homosexuality.

Corydon Throsp owned a maisonette where Captain Pirate Prentice lives in the beginning of Gravity's Rainbow by Thomas Pynchon.

The name is again used for a shepherd boy in an English children's fantasy trilogy by Tobias Druitt. :

- Corydon and the Island of Monsters (2005)
- Corydon and the Fall of Atlantis (2006)
- Corydon and the Siege of Troy (2007)

The two final poems in D. A. Powell's book Chronic (2009) are called "Corydon and Alexis" and "Corydon and Alexis: Redux."
