= Corydon (book) =

Book by André Gide

- First edition
- Author: André Gide
- Translator: Richard Howard
- Language: French
- Publisher: Nouvelle Revue Française
- Publication date: May 1924
- Publication place: France

Corydon is a book by André Gide consisting of four Socratic dialogues on homosexuality. The name of the book comes from Virgil's pederastic character Corydon. Parts of the text were separately privately printed from 1911 to 1920, and the whole book appeared in its French original in France in May 1924 and in the United States in 1950. It is available in an English translation (ISBN 0-252-07006-2) by the poet Richard Howard.

The dialogues use evidence from naturalists, historians, poets, and philosophers in order to back up Gide's argument that homosexuality is not unnatural and that it pervaded the most culturally and artistically advanced civilizations such as Periclean Greece, Renaissance Italy and Elizabethan England. Gide argues this is reflected by writers and artists from Homer and Virgil to Titian and Shakespeare. Gide states that these authors depicted male–male relationships, such as that of Achilles and Patroclus, as homosexual rather than as platonic as other critics insisted. Gide uses this evidence to insist that homosexuality is more fundamental and natural than exclusive heterosexuality, which he believes is merely a union constructed by society.

Gide considered Corydon to be his most important work. "My friends insist that this little book is of the kind which will do me the greatest harm", he wrote of the book.

== See also ==
- Homosexuality in ancient Greece
- Homosexuality in ancient Rome
- Straightwashing
