= Kinzua Township, Warren County, Pennsylvania =

Former township in Pennsylvania, US

Kinzua Township Seneca: Tgëdzó:a’
- Township
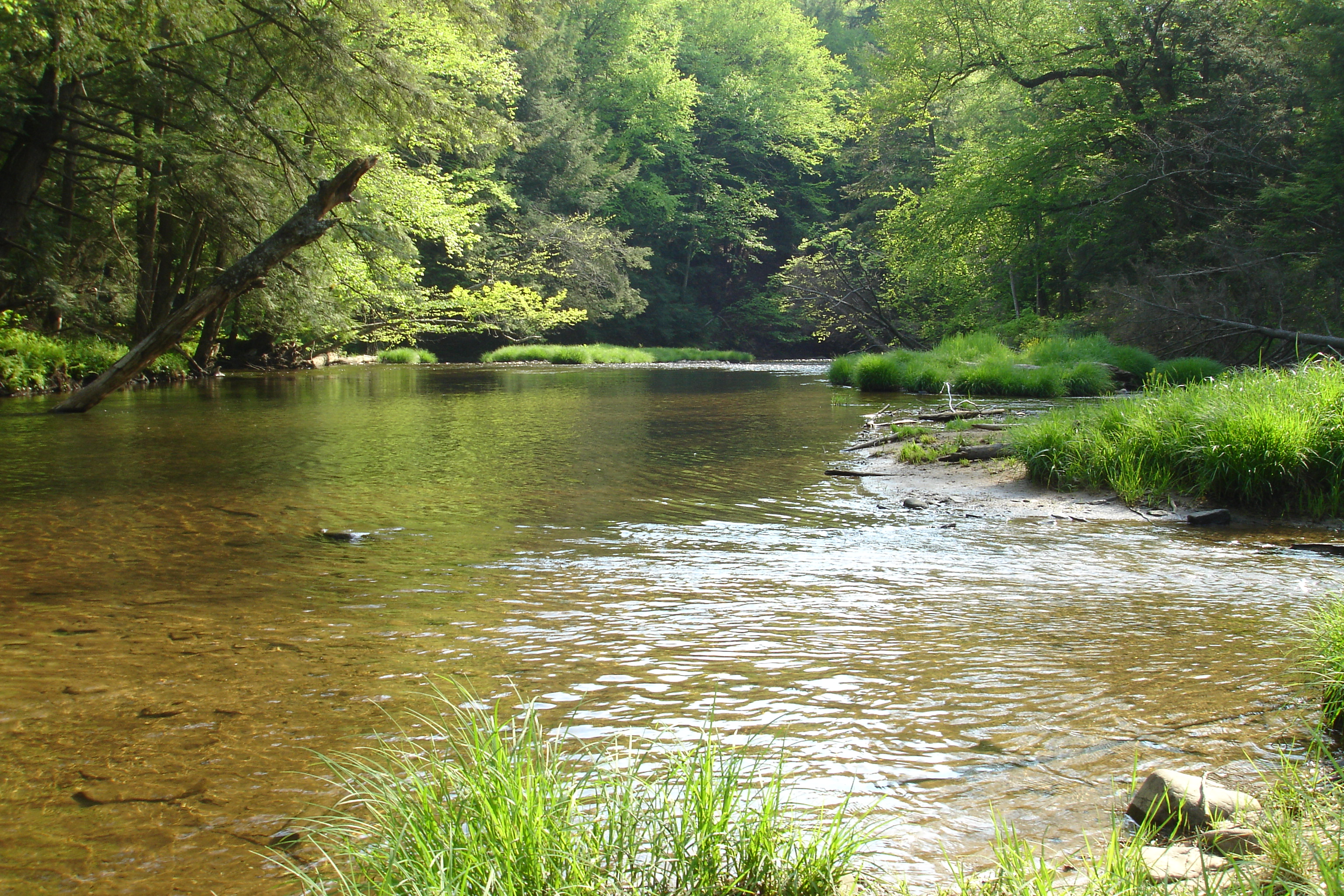
- Kinzua Creek in the former Kinzua Township, near its mouth at the Allegheny River

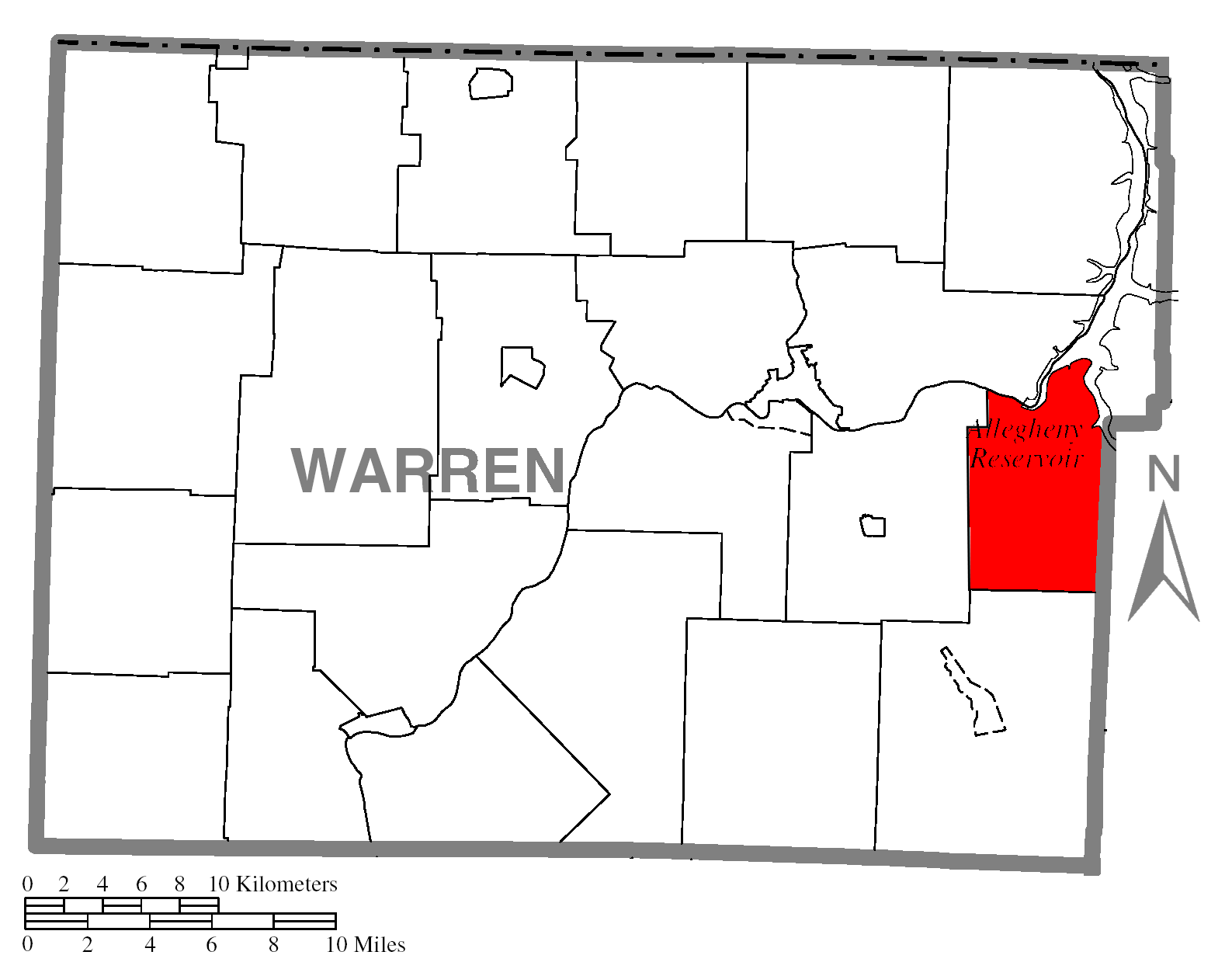
- Former location of Kinzua Township in modern-day Warren County

- Location of Warren County in Pennsylvania
- Coordinates: 41°47′0″N 79°1′0″W
- Country: United States
- State: Pennsylvania
- County: Warren
- Settled: 1801
- Elevation: 1,916 ft (584 m)
- Time zone: UTC-4 (EST)
  - Summer (DST): UTC-5 (EDT)
- Area code: 814

Kinzua Township (Seneca: Tgëdzó:a’) was a township in Warren County, Pennsylvania in the United States. The township was merged in 1963 into Mead Township.

== History ==
Historical population
Year	Pop.
1840	237
1850	232
1860	301
1870	318
1880	348
1890	941
1900	1,236
1910	517
1920	447
1930	453
1940	541
1950	485
1960	458
Source: United States Census Bureau

Warren County was formed on March 12, 1800 out of Allegheny County, with the original township of Brokenstraw being formed in that October from everything in the county west of the Allegheny River and Conewango Creek; Conewango Township was formed in March 1808 and consisted of the unincorporated eastern half of Warren County. On March 8, 1821, the county divided the two townships into twelve townships; Kinzua Township was incorporated out of portions of Brokenstraw Township and was originally township "Number Eight". On June 7, 1833, the southern half of Kinzua Township was used to create Sheffield Township. Portions of Kinzua, Pleasant, and Sheffield townships were incorporated on June 4, 1847 into Mead Township.

The township grew slowly at first, receiving a brief boom during the 1890s and 1900s as the lumber industry in the area surged. When the forests were depleted, population fell almost as rapidly. Kinzua Township hovered at around 500 residents from 1910 through the rest of its existence.

Construction of the Kinzua Dam caused the resulting Allegheny Reservoir to submerge the majority of the communities in Kinzua Township. The township was annexed, along with Corydon Township, to Mead Township in 1963.

Kinzua's Keystone Marker remains intact and has been relocated into the hands of a private collector.

== Geography ==
Kinzua Township was located on the eastern border of Warren County, and was bounded by the Allegheny River on the northwest, Kinzua Creek (and on the other side of that, the Warren County portion of Corydon Township) to the northeast, McKean County on the east, Sheffield Township to the south, and Mead Township on the west.

== See also ==
- Elko, New York

== Sources ==
- Schenck, J.S.; Rann, R.S., eds. (1887). History of Warren County, Pennsylvania. Syracuse, New York: D. Mason & Co.
- Hottenstein, JoAnne; Welch, Sibyl (1965). "Warren County". Incorporation dates of Pennsylvania municipalities (PDF). Harrisburg: Bureau of Municipal Affairs, Pennsylvania Department of Internal Affairs.
