= Corydon Township, Warren County, Pennsylvania =

Former township in Pennsylvania, US

Corydon Township
- Township
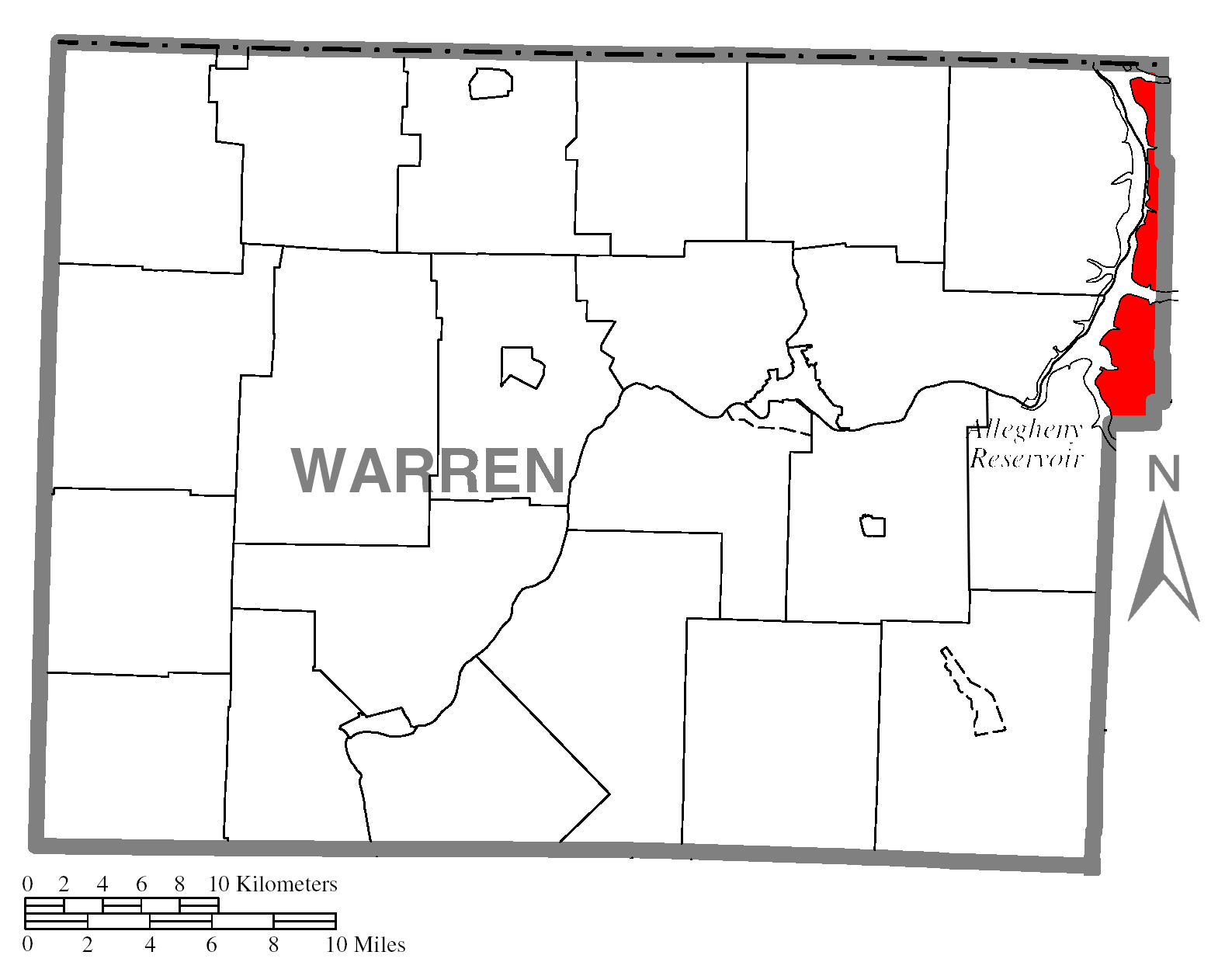
- Former location of Corydon Township in modern-day Warren County

- Location of Warren County in Pennsylvania
- Coordinates: 41°47′0″N 79°1′0″W
- Country: United States
- State: Pennsylvania
- County: Warren
- Settled: 1827
- Time zone: UTC-4 (EST)
  - Summer (DST): UTC-5 (EDT)
- Area code: 814

Corydon Township is a defunct township in Warren County, Pennsylvania in the United States. The township was merged in 1964 into Mead Township.

== History ==
Historical population
Year	Pop.
1850	228
1860	302
1870	411
1880	335
1890	527
1900	646
1910	402
1920	330
1930	327
1940	260
1950	263
1960	206
Source: United States Census Bureau

Warren County was formed on March 12, 1800 out of Allegheny County, with the original township of Brokenstraw being formed in that October from everything in the county west of the Allegheny River and Conewango Creek; Conewango Township was formed in March 1808 and consisted of the unincorporated eastern half of Warren County. On March 26, 1846, a portion of Corydon Township in McKean County was set off for Warren County.

Philip Tome, a native of Dauphin County, was the first settler in Corydon in 1827 and for many years was interpreter for Seneca chiefs Cornplanter and Governor Blacksnake. The Buffalo, New York, and Philadelphia Railroad opened in 1882 and brought growth to the community, bringing in stores, a hotel, a stave-mill, a pulp company, a spoke factory, a handle factory, a saw mill, a shingle mill, and various other industries.

Population of (West) Corydon peaked in 1900; while it received a modest boost in population in the 1890s, it did not experience the massive boom and bust that its neighboring townships along the Allegheny did. It was in a state of persistent decline through the first half of the 20th century and had already shrunk to less than a third of its peak by 1960. Construction of the Kinzua Dam caused the resulting Allegheny Reservoir to submerge the remaining communities in Corydon Township. The little remaining land that remained above water was annexed to Mead Township in 1964.

== Geography ==
Corydon Township was located on a strip of land in the extreme northeastern corner of Warren County, and was bounded by the Town of South Valley, New York on the north; (East) Corydon in McKean County on the east, Kinzua Township to the south; and the Allegheny River on the west. A ferry service (Webb's Ferry) connected Corydon with Elk Township, Warren County, Pennsylvania across the river. The ferry's western terminus in Elk Township remains in use, maintained by the Allegheny National Forest.

== Sources ==
- Schenck, J.S.; Rann, R.S., eds. (1887). History of Warren County, Pennsylvania. Syracuse, New York: D. Mason & Co.
- Hottenstein, JoAnne; Welch, Sibyl (1965). "Warren County". Incorporation dates of Pennsylvania municipalities (PDF). Harrisburg: Bureau of Municipal Affairs, Pennsylvania Department of Internal Affairs.
