= Gerhard Schmidt (biochemist) =

Biochemist

- Born: 26 December 1901; Stuttgart
- Died: 30 April 1981 (aged 79); Boston
- Education: University of Tübingen; Goethe University Frankfurt
- Awards: Member of the National Academy of Sciences (1976)
- Scientific career
- Fields: Biochemistry
- Workplaces: Goethe University Frankfurt; Rockefeller Institute for Medical Research; Tufts University School of Medicine
- Doctoral advisor: Gustav Embden

Gerhard Schmidt (26 December 1901 – 30 April 1981) was a German-born physician and biochemist who was regarded as "a world authority on nucleic acids and phospholipids."

== Career ==
=== Life in Germany ===
He was born in Stuttgart, where his father Julius Schmidt was a professor of chemistry at the University of Stuttgart. He studied medicine at the University of Tübingen and the Goethe University Frankfurt, and earned a doctorate at the Goethe University under the supervision of the university's then-rector Gustav Embden in 1926. He then worked as a research assistant and as a Privatdozent at the Goethe University's department of biochemistry and at the Senckenberg Institute of Pathology, where he was a collaborator and protégé of the institute's director and rector of the Goethe University Bernhard Fischer-Wasels. Following the Nazi takeover of Germany, he immediately faced persecution due to his Jewish background. Herman Kalckar notes:

The Nazis confronted the chairman of the pathology department, Dr. Fischer-Wasels, and accused the young "Jewish doctor" Gerhard Schmidt of falsifying the findings of the autopsy. Since Gerhard was engaged exclusively in medical research and had no responsibility whatsoever for autopsies, Fischer-Wasels immediately suspected a plot and with deep sorrow urged Schmidt to leave Nazi Germany. At first, Gerhard found the accusations too absurd to be alarmed. But finally, when Fischer-Wasels insisted on accompanying him to the next train for Switzerland, Gerhard became convinced of the imminent danger of the conspiracy. With only a few belongings (perhaps including his beloved cello), he left Germany for neutral Switzerland.

— Herman Kalckar

=== Refugee and life in the United States ===
Schmidt spent the next two years as a refugee in Italy and Sweden, where he worked at the University of Naples, the Stockholm University and the University of Florence.

In 1935 he received a Carnegie Foundation Research Fellowship for Displaced German Scholars at Queen's University at Kingston in Canada. In 1937 he joined the Rockefeller Institute for Medical Research in New York City and the following year the Washington University School of Medicine. In 1940 he became a research associate at the Tufts University School of Medicine where he spent the rest of his career, from 1948 as a research professor and from 1955 as a professor of biochemistry.

He "made a ground-breaking discovery regarding the development of nucleic acid metabolism, introducing a quantitative method for determining DNA and RNA in tissues. The simplicity and reliability of the method continues to play an important role in molecular biology research."

He became a member of the National Academy of Sciences in 1976.
