= Conewango =

Conewango may refer to:

Communities

- Conewango, New York, a town in Cattaraugus County
- Conewango Township, Warren County, Pennsylvania

Streams

- Conewango Creek, in Pennsylvania and Western New York

== See also ==
- Conewago (disambiguation)
