= Bernhard Fischer-Wasels =

German physician (1877–1941)

Professor Bernhard Fischer-Wasels
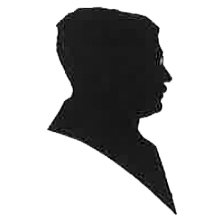
- A silhouette of Bernhard Fischer-Wasels made by Rose Hölscher
- Born: Bernhard Fischer; 25 January 1877; Atsch near Stolberg (Rhineland)
- Died: 23 December 1941 (aged 64); Frankfurt am Main
- Scientific career
- Fields: Anatomical pathology, oncology
- Institutions: Goethe University Frankfurt
- Doctoral advisor: Karl Koester
- Notable students: Philipp Schwartz; Rudolf Jaffé; Edgar Goldschmid; Gerhard Schmidt

Bernhard Fischer-Wasels (25 January 1877, in Atsch near Stolberg (Rhineland) – 23 December 1941, in Frankfurt), known as Bernhard Fischer until 1926, was a German physician and anatomical pathologist, who served as Director of the Senckenberg Institute of Pathology (1908–1941), Professor of Pathology (1914–1941) and Rector of the Goethe University Frankfurt (1930–1931). He was a leading cancer researcher and is world-renowned as the father of petrochemical carcinogenesis.

== Career ==
Bernhard Fischer studied medicine in Strasbourg, Munich and Berlin, and obtained his doctoral degree in Bonn in 1900 and his Habilitation in 1903. His doctoral advisor was Karl Koester, himself a student of Friedrich Daniel von Recklinghausen and a grand-disciple of the father of modern pathology, Rudolf Virchow.

Bernhard Fischer became Professor and Prosector at the Augusta Hospital in Cologne in 1908. Already in the same year, he was appointed Director of the Senckenberg Institute of Pathology in Frankfurt, at the age of 31, and became Professor Ordinarius of Pathology at the Goethe University Frankfurt from its establishment by the wealthy liberal citizenry of Frankfurt in 1914. From 1930 to 1931, he was Rector of the Goethe University Frankfurt.

As rector of the university, he was noted for his elitist views, believing university education should be reserved for the talented few; having refused to join the Nazi Party despite the considerable pressure, he was perceived by the Nazis as a representative of the "liberal old professors."

His students and long-time collaborators at the Senckenberg Institute of Pathology included Philipp Schwartz, Rudolf Jaffé, Edgar Goldschmid and Gerhard Schmidt, all of whom had to flee the country due to their Jewish backgrounds, partially at the urging and with the help of Fischer-Wasels. Several of his students became prominent scientists in exile. Herman Kalckar described Fischer-Wasels as "a conscientious scholar and administrator who abhorred anti-Semitism" and who rescued several Jewish medical scholars.

The young physician Rose Hölscher, who also fled the country in 1933, made a silhouette of him, published in the 1921 booklet Frankfurter Charakterköpfe with portraits of prominent Frankfurt physicians.

He nominated Gustav Embden for the Nobel Prize in Physiology or Medicine in 1929.

== Background ==
He was a son of glassworks director Heinrich Fischer, and his family belonged to the Old Catholic Church. He married Swiss-born Clara Wasels, daughter of a Zurich business executive, in 1909; after her death in 1925, he combined her birth name Wasels with his own in 1926. He was married to Margarete Knögel in his second marriage from 1926. He had four and three children, respectively, in each of his marriages.
