= Beulah Boyd Ritchie =

American suffragist (1864–1939)

- Born: Anna Beulah Boyd; March 24, 1864; Wheeling, West Virginia, US
- Died: October 4, 1939 (aged 75); Warren State Hospital, North Warren, Pennsylvania, US
- Occupations: Suffragist; temperance leader; clubwoman; educator; librarian
- Spouse: Charles Marcene Ritchie (1869–1957)

Anna Beulah Boyd Ritchie (March 24, 1864 – October 4, 1939) was an American suffragist. She was a founding member of the Fairmont Woman Suffrage Club (later the Fairmont Political Equality Club), third president of the West Virginia Equal Suffrage Association, and officer in the West Virginia Woman's Christian Temperance Union.

== Background ==
Born on March 24, 1864, Anna Beulah Boyd was the eldest child of suffragists Annie Boyd Caldwell and Judge George Edmund Boyd. She was raised in Wheeling, West Virginia. She graduated from Wooster University (now Wooster College) in Ohio with a bachelor's and master's degree. She was a member of the Kappa Kappa Gamma sorority there. She taught for two years at Carthage College in Missouri. She then moved back to Wheeling where she taught public school for two years. She then taught at the Fairmont State Normal School (now Fairmont State University) where for three years (1890-1893) she taught drawing, physical geography, botany, natural history, zoology and physiology.

She married Charles Marcene Ritchie (1869–1957) on June 3, 1893. The next year they had their one child: Jean Boyd Ritchie Hoagland (1894-1980).

== Suffrage work ==
In late November 1895, the National American Woman Suffrage Association helped organize a convention at Grafton, West Virginia, where the West Virginia Equal Suffrage Association was founded. Beulah Boyd Ritchie presented on the second day a presentation about woman suffrage entitled, "Does the Working Woman Need It?" The following evening, on November 28, 1895, NAWSA's Rev. Henrietta Moore presented a lecture in the Fairmont Normal School hall, and afterwards about fifty women formed the Fairmont Woman Suffrage Club (later the Fairmont Political Equality Club). Ritchie was elected the corresponding secretary of this local suffrage club.

Ritchie's leadership in the suffrage movement included a close connection with NAWSA's Carrie Chapman Catt, who was the keynote speaker at the 1897 WVESA convention. Ritche was elected recording secretary of the state organization at that meeting. In the fall of 1899, Fairmont again hosted the state suffrage convention and again featuring Carrie Chapman Catt. Ritchie was elected president at that meeting. Catt wrote in the National Suffrage Bulletin: “Mrs. Ritchie is young, enthusiastic and intelligent. The work in the State is in promising condition and the Association will undoubtedly increase in membership the coming year.”

Ritchie led campaigns to get a NAWSA representative (Rev. Anna Shaw) to speak before the legislature, collected nearly 600 signed membership cards, a partial suffrage bill that her father championed in the House of Delegates and another one for presidential suffrage(though both were defeated), publications in local newspapers and personal letters to each member of the legislature.

Ritchie stepped down as WVESA president at the state convention in August 1904 at Moundsville, West Virginia, but was retained on the executive board as vice-president at-large.

She remained as president of the Fairmont Political Equality Club (PEC), and she also began her leadership role in the Fairmont Woman's Christian Temperance Union (WCTU) chapter, taking on the chairmanship of the Franchise Department in 1903. By 1907 she became corresponding secretary for the state WCTU.

In 1911, at the WVESA state suffrage convention hosted by Ritchie and the Fairmont PEC, Richie was elected to serve as a delegate to the NAWSA convention. She was re-elected to this position for several years thereafter, attending the NAWSA conventions regularly.

For several weeks in 1913, as the West Virginia legislature prepared to meet, Richie organized public speakers to support a women's suffrage bill. This attempt gained a majority in both houses of the legislature but not the required two-thirds to send it to the state voters as a referendum to change the state constitution. Ritchie also attended the march in Washington D.C. As she told the story to a reporter several years later, she remembered that when the men in the crowds saw the West Virginia women's banner, they started calling them “'coal diggers,' and 'snake hunters' as well as other names."

In fall 1916, Ritchie again took the lead in Fairmont to try to push a suffrage bill through the legislature, but by then the anti-suffragist contingent was in full force. A referendum to change the state constitution went to the voters, and the suffrage amendment was defeated in a landslide.

In February 1920, Governor John J. Cornwell called a special session of the legislature, ostensibly to debate a new tax bill but included on the agenda ratification of the new federal amendment for woman suffrage recently passed by Congress. Ritchie, serving as an officer in the Fairmont Woman's Club, signed up as a member of the WVESA's State Advisory Committee to support Lenna Lowe Yost's Ratification Committee as they lobbied the legislators one-on-one to vote to ratify the Susan B. Anthony Amendment. On March 10 both houses had approved the ratification bill, and West Virginia became the thirty-fourth of the thirty-six states needed for ratification of the Nineteenth Amendment to the United States Constitution.

== Illness and death ==
By fall 1918, Ritchie was working as a librarian at the Fairmont City Library. She stopped working in 1920 when the library shut down, and for the 1930 Census she identified herself as keeping house, as her husband was by then working as the county assessor.

She died in the Warren State Hospital, in North Warren, Pennsylvania, on October 4, 1939, aged 75, of cancer.

== See also ==
- Lenna Lowe Yost
- National American Woman Suffrage Association
- West Virginia Equal Suffrage Association

== Resources ==
- Boyd, Annie Caldwell (1897). "West Virginia". In Avery, Rachel Foster (ed.). Proceedings of the Twenty-Ninth Annual Convention of the National American Woman Suffrage Association at The Central Christian Church… Des Moines, Iowa, January 26th… 29, 1897. Philadelphia, PA: Alfred J. Ferris. hdl:2027/mdp.39015005295657.
- Effland, Anne Wallace. “The Woman Suffrage Movement in West Virginia, 1867-1920,” M.A. thesis, West Virginia University, 1983. Available via The Research Repository@WVU at https://researchrepository.wvu.edu/etd/7361.
- Ritchie, Beulah Boyd (November 22, 1896). "Annual Report of the Political Equality Club of Fairmont". Wheeling Sunday Register.
- Ritchie, Beulah Boyd (1900). "West Virginia". In Avery, Rachel Foster (ed.). Proceedings of the Thirty-Second Annual Convention of the National American Woman Suffrage Association…Washington D.C., February 8 … 14, 1900. Philadelphia, PA: Alfred J. Ferris. hdl:2027/hvd.rslfdp.
- Ritchie, Beulah Boyd (1901). "West Virginia". In Blackwell, Alice Stone (ed.). Proceedings of the Thirty-Third Annual Convention of the National American Woman Suffrage Association… at Minneapolis, Minn. May 30 … June 5, 1901. Warren, Ohio: Frank W. Perry. hdl:2027/hvd.rslfdq.
- Ritchie, Beulah Boyd (1902). "West Virginia". In Blackwell, Alice Stone (ed.). Proceedings of the Thirty-Fourth Annual Convention of the National American Woman Suffrage Association, held at Washington D.C., February 14th… 18th, 1902. Warren, Ohio: Frank W. Perry. hdl:2027/hvd.rslfdr.
- Ritchie, Beulah Boyd (1903). "West Virginia". In Upton, Harriet Taylor (ed.). Proceedings of the Thirty-Fifth Annual Convention of the National-American Woman Suffrage Association Held at New Orleans, La., March 19th to 25th, inclusive, 1903. Warren, Ohio: Wm. Ritezel & Co. hdl:2027/mdp.39015039253557.
- Ritchie, Beulah Boyd (1904). "West Virginia". In Upton, Harriet Taylor (ed.). Proceedings of the Thirty-Sixth Annual Convention of the National American Woman Suffrage Association…. Washington D.C. February 7-10, 1904. Warren, Ohio: Wm. Ritezel & Co. hdl:2027/mdp.39015039253557.
- Anthony, Susan B.; Harper, Ida Husted, eds. (1902). "West Virginia". History of Woman Suffrage, Vol. IV, 1883-1900. Rochester, NY: Susan B. Anthony. pp. 980–984. hdl:2027/coo.31924052143595.
- Harper, Ida Husted, ed. (1922). "West Virginia". History of Woman Suffrage, Vol. VI, 1900-1920. NY: National American Woman Suffrage Association. pp. 687–698. hdl:2027/uc1.31210013897713.
- "West Virginia Men Urge Ratification". The Woman Citizen. January 17, 1920. hdl:2027/inu.30000098651064.
