= Werner Jaffé =

Werner Gunter Jaffé Fellner (October 27, 1914 – May 3, 2009) was a chemist and university professor. During the fifty years that he taught at the college level, he published over 200 academic publications and was named honorary professor at the Simón Bolívar University.

== Early life and education ==
Jaffé was born in Frankfurt as a child of Rudolf Jaffé. He received his doctoral degree at the University of Zurich under the supervision of the Nobel Prize winner Paul Karrer.

== Career ==
After graduating, Jaffé arrived in Venezuela in 1940 and became a professor at the Central University of Venezuela. He started the teaching of Biochemistry at the Central University and founded the Instituto Nacional de Nutrición. He was cofounder of the Venezuelan Association for the Advancement of Science.

in 1946 he received a grant from the Rockefeller Foundation and, among several science prizes, he was awarded the Premio Nacional de Ciencia, CONICIT in 1978.

== Death and legacy ==
He died in Caracas in 2009.

== Bibliography ==
- Werner Röder; Herbert A. Strauss (ed.): International Biographical Dictionary of Central European Emigrés 1933-1945. Vol 2,1. München : Saur, 1983 ISBN 3-598-10089-2, p. 563
