= Edgar Goldschmid =

German physician, pathologist & historian of medicine (1881-1957)

Edgar Goldschmid (14 December 1881 – 26 May 1957) in was a German physician, pathologist and historian of medicine. He was the author of Geschichte und Bibliographie der pathologischen-anatomischen Abbildung (1925). (Note: The book title Geschichte und Bibliographie der pathologischen-anatomischen Abbildung translates in English to "History and Bibliography of Pathological Anatomical Illustration".)

== Career and work ==
Goldschmid was born on 14 December 1881 in Frankfurt, Germany. Born to a Jewish family, he was a son of the banker and art collector Eduard Goldschmid, and attended the Lessing-Gymnasium in Frankfurt. He studied medicine at the University of Freiburg, Kiel University, and the Ludwig-Maximilians-Universität München, where he was influenced notably by Otto von Bollinger. At the Ludwig-Maximilians-Universität München, he obtained his doctorate in 1905 with a dissertation on tuberculosis in children.

He worked at hospitals in Munich, London, Berlin and Geneva, before returning to his birth town Frankfurt. From 1913 he worked at the Senckenberg Institute of Pathology and was a close collaborator of the institute's director Bernhard Fischer-Wasels. He was an adjunct professor (Privatdozent) at the University of Frankfurt am Main from 1914 and associate professor of pathology from 1920. From 1920, he was a contributor to Handbuch der normalen und pathologischen Physiologie. His most important work is Geschichte und Bibliographie der pathologischen-anatomischen Abbildung, which was published in Leipzig in 1925. As a result of the Nazi takeover, Goldschmid immigrated to Switzerland and was Professor of history of medicine at the University of Lausanne from 1933. He had an extensive library and his house in Lausanne was decorated with paintings and art objects from his father's collection.

Goldschmid died on 26 May 1957 in Lausanne.
