= Joseph Root =

Joseph Root may refer to:

- Joseph M. Root (1807–1879), U.S. Representative from Ohio
- Joseph Pomeroy Root (1826–1885), American doctor, politician, and leader of the Kansas Free Staters
- Joseph Cullen Root, founder of Modern Woodmen of America
- Joe Root (born 1990), English cricketer
- Joe Root (hermit) (1860–1912), hermit in Pennsylvania
