= Warren State Hospital =

- Pennsylvania Department of Human Services
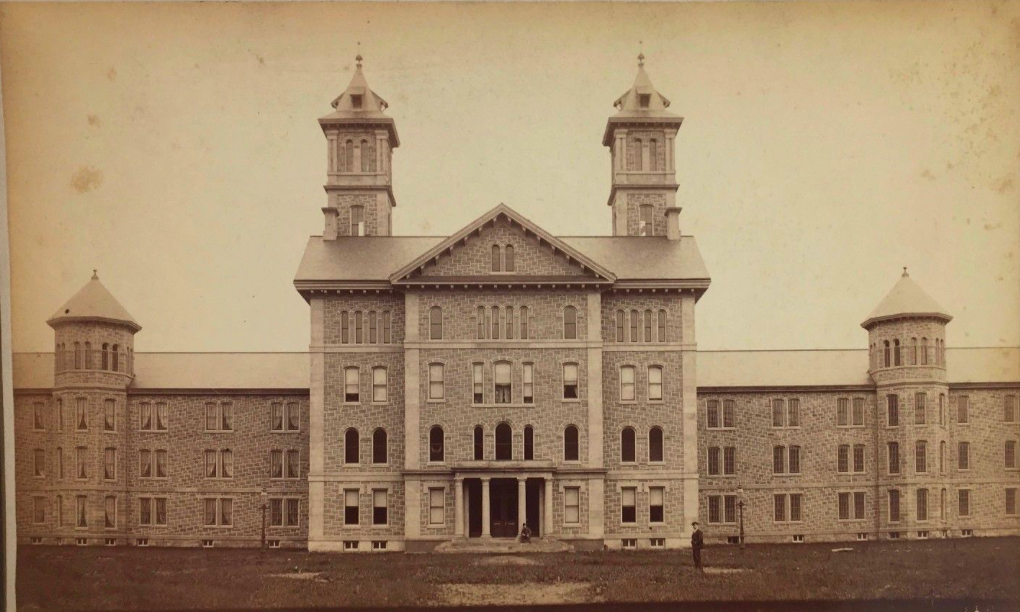
- Hospital pictured in 1886

Geography
- Location: North Warren, Conewango Township, Pennsylvania, United States
- Coordinates: 41.8792°N 79.1458°W

Organization
- Care system: Public

History
- Opened: 1880

Links
- Website: Warren State Hospital
- Lists: Hospitals in Pennsylvania

Warren State Hospital is a public psychiatric hospital established in 1880 in North Warren, Conewango Township near Warren, Pennsylvania. The original hospital was designed by John McArthur Jr. and constructed under the Kirkbride Plan. Its population peaked at 2,562 residents in 1947. As of 2024, the hospital is still active.

Residents included Nictzin Dyalhis’s first wife and Joe Root. Known staff included Penny Colman’s father and Philipp Schwartz as well as Dr. Hanus Jiri Grosz, a Czech-born psychiatrist who went on to pioneer the use of group therapy in the U.S.

== See also ==
- Jamestown Community College
- List of hospitals in Pennsylvania
