= Philipp Schwartz =

Hungarian-born neuropathologist

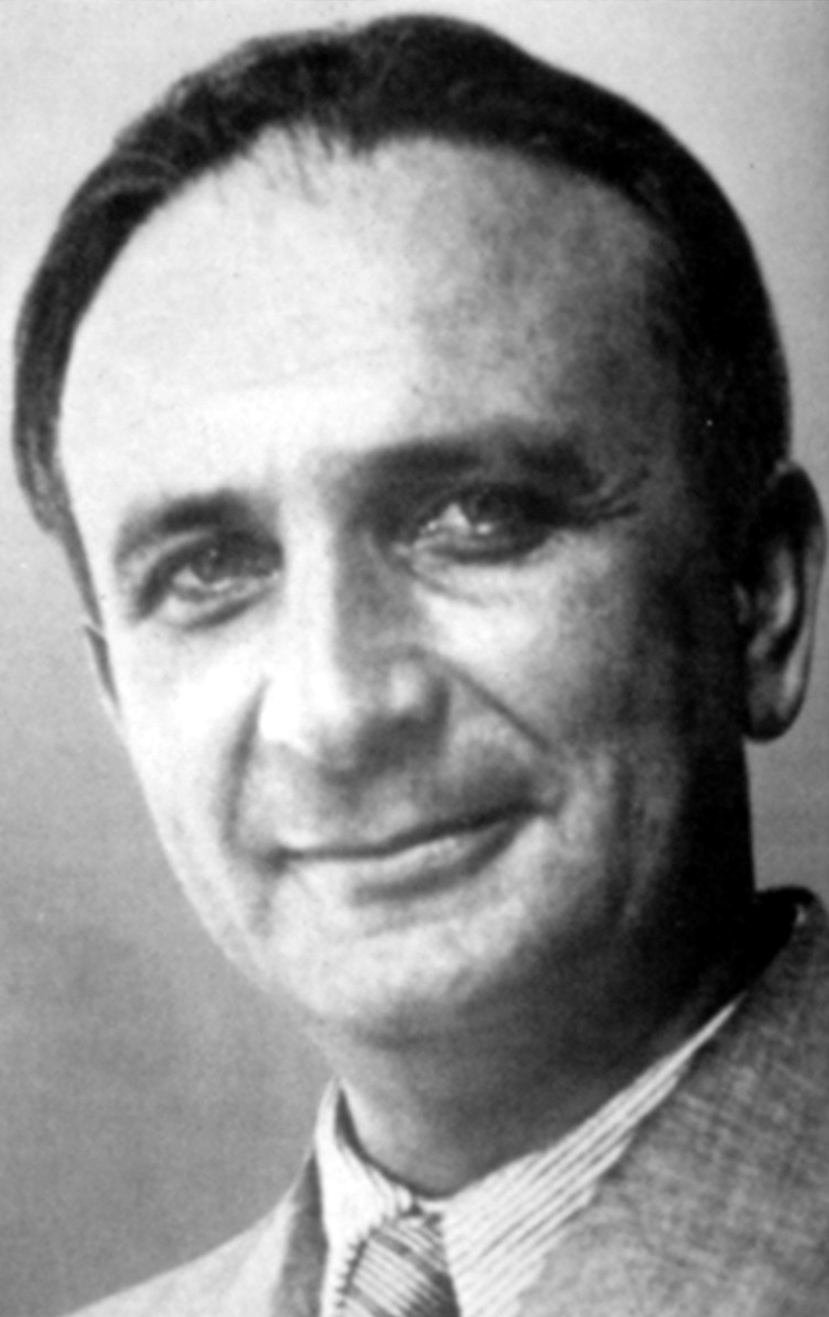
- Schwartz in 1960
- Born: 19 July 1894; Versec, Austria-Hungary
- Died: 1 December 1977 (aged 83); Fort Lauderdale, U.S.
- Scientific career
- Fields: Pathology
- Institutions: Goethe University Frankfurt; University of Istanbul; Warren State Hospital

Philipp Schwartz (19 July 1894 – 1 December 1977) was a Hungarian-born neuropathologist. In the interwar period he was a professor in Frankfurt, Germany. He became a major figure in the community of German émigré scientists after 1933 and founded the Emergency Association of German Scientists Abroad.

== Early career ==
Schwartz was born on 19 July 1894 in Versec. He studied medicine in Budapest and earned his doctorate there in 1919. In the same year, he became an assistant of Bernhard Fischer at the Senckenberg Institute of Pathology at the University of Frankfurt, where he worked for the next 14 years. He earned his Habilitation in 1923, became an associate professor in 1926 and a full professor in 1927.

== Life in exile ==
Following the Nazi takeover in Germany in 1933 he was dismissed from his university chair for being Jewish, and he emigrated to Zürich, Switzerland, where he founded the Emergency Association of German Scientists Abroad to help other refugees find new employment. He notably established contacts with Turkish universities. Together with Albert Malche, Schwartz convinced the Turkish government to offer a significant number of persecuted German professors employment in Turkey. Finally, contracts of up to five years were signed. Over time around 150 academics immigrated to Turkey. Most of them were from the economic, finance, legal or medical fields, while social sciences played a less important role. He later became director of the Department of Pathology at the University of Istanbul.

From 1953 he worked as a pathologist at the Warren State Hospital in Pennsylvania and chaired a research department there. In 1957 he was formally reinstated as a Professor (emeritus) at the Goethe University, but the university declined his wish to resume teaching due to his age.

== Family ==
His daughter is the Zürich psychiatrist Susan Ferenz-Schwartz. He is interred at the Fluntern Cemetery in Zürich.
