= Gustav Embden =

German chemist (1874–1933)

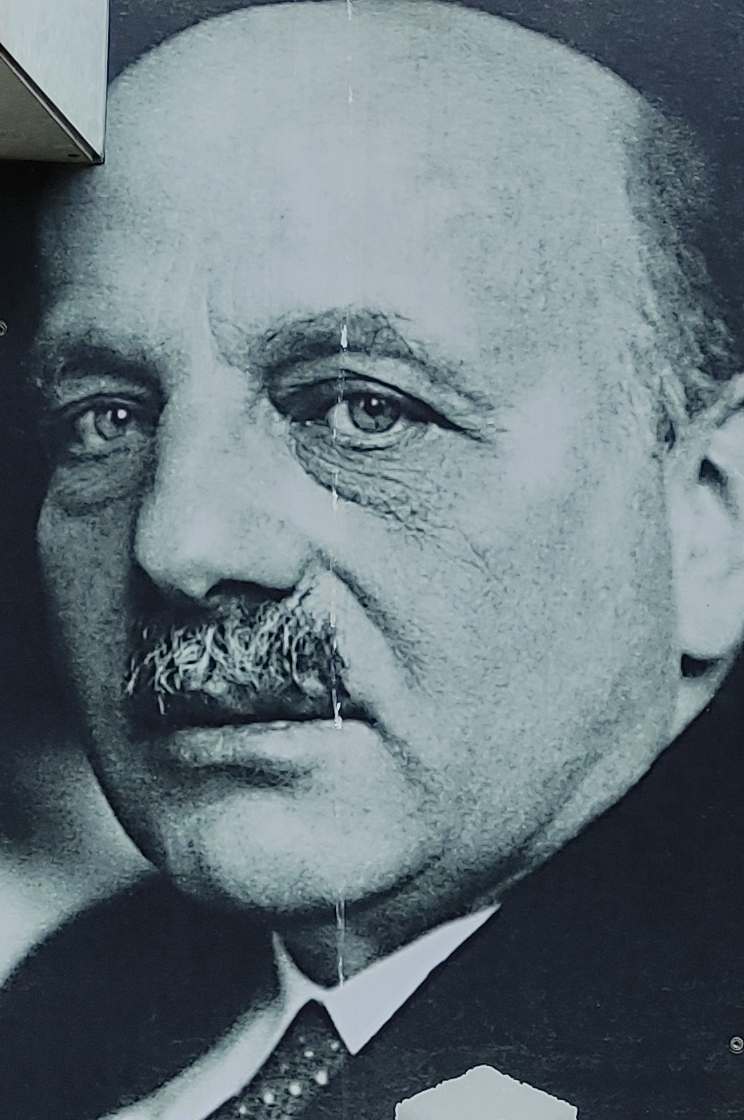
- Portrait on a plaque in Frankfurt
- Born: 10 November 1874; Hamburg, Germany
- Died: 25 July 1933 (aged 58); Nassau, Germany
- Known for: Embden–Meyerhof pathway
- Scientific career
- Fields: Physiological chemist

Gustav Georg Embden (10 November 1874 – 25 July 1933) was a German physiological chemist.

== Background ==
Gustav Embden was a son of the Hamburg lawyer and politician George Heinrich Embden. His grandmother Charlotte Heine was a well-known salonnière and a sister of the poet Heinrich Heine.

== Education and career ==
Embden initially studied in Freiburg, Strasbourg, Munich, Berlin, and Zurich under the famous physiologists of his time, including Johannes von Kries, Franz Hofmeister, Gaule, Paul Ehrlich, and Julius Richard Ewald. In 1904, he became the director of the chemistry laboratory of the medical clinic at the Frankfurt-Sachsenhausen municipal hospital. His research here helped to build the clinic into the Physiological Institute by 1907 and into the University Institute for Vegetative Physiology in 1914. In the same year, he retained his directorship and started teaching at the University of Frankfurt am Main. Embden served as the rector of the university from 1925 to 1926.

== Research ==
Embden conducted studies on carbohydrate metabolism and muscle contraction, and he was the first to discover and link together all the steps involved in the conversion of glycogen to lactic acid. In 1918, Otto Fritz Meyerhof's work on cellular metabolism showed that the process involved the breakdown of glucose to lactic acid. Embden is known for having worked out the precise steps involved in this breakdown. Henceforth, this cellular metabolic sequence from glycogen to lactic acid became known as the Embden–Meyerhof pathway.

Embden had also worked on developing a technique to prevent tissue damage. In doing so, he discovered the liver's role in metabolic processes, thereby laying a foundation for understanding normal sugar metabolism and of its pathological form, diabetes.

Some scientific historians, such as Thomas Kuhn, consider the work done in the 1930s in the laboratories of Meyerhof, Parnas, Embden, Warburg, etc. to be the mark of a true scientific revolution.

== Awards ==
Although Embden was never awarded a Nobel Prize, he was nominated 12 times over 8 years.

Nobel Prize Academic Field	Year	Nominator(s)
Physiology or Medicine	1923	Karl Hürthle, Albrecht Julius Theodor Bethe, Ernst Schmitz
Physiology or Medicine	1924	Albrecht Kossel
Physiology or Medicine	1927	Albrecht Kossel
Physiology or Medicine	1929	L Seitz, Bernh. Fischer-Wasels, K Goldstein
Physiology or Medicine	1930	Ernst Schmitz
Physiology or Medicine	1932	A Dieudonné
Chemistry	1932	Hans von Euler-Chelpin
Physiology or Medicine	1933	E Cruickshank
