= Hans Schmaus =

German pathologist (1862–1905)

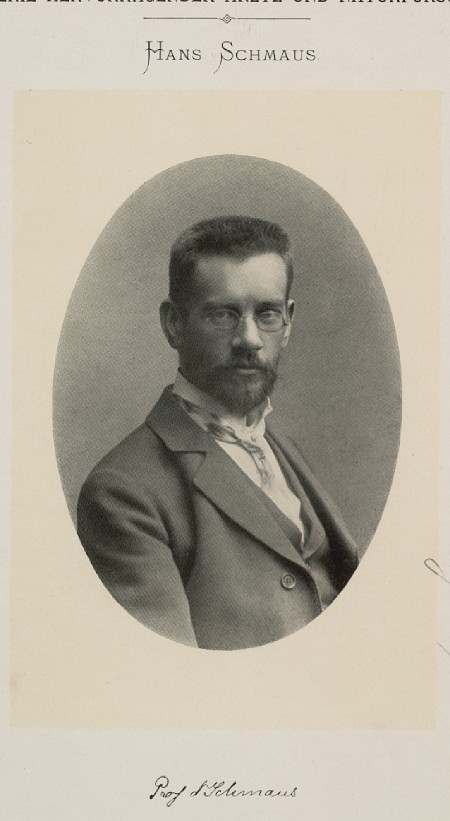
photograph of Hans Schmaus ca. 1900

Hans Schmaus (22 May 1862 in Munich, Kingdom of Bavaria – 4 December 1905 in Munich) was a German pathologist.

In 1887, he obtained his doctorate at the Ludwig-Maximilians-Universität München, where he spent the next several years as an assistant to Otto Bollinger at the institute of pathology. In 1889, he became habilitated for pathology, becoming an associate professor at the Ludwig-Maximilians-Universität München in 1899.

At the Ludwig-Maximilians-Universität München, he performed studies involving the pathological anatomy of the spinal cord, and did research of hyaline degeneration and caseous necrosis. With pathologist Eugen Albrecht, he conducted studies of coagulative necrosis.

== Published works ==
He was the author of Grundriss der pathologischen Anatomie, a book that was issued in several editions and published in English as "A Text-book of Pathology and Pathological Anatomy", (translation by James Ewing; Lea brothers & Company, 1902). Other noteworthy efforts by Schmaus include:

- Zur Kenntniss der diffuser Hirnsklerose, 1888 - Towards the understanding of diffuse cerebral sclerosis.
- Die Kompressions-Myelitis bei Karies der Wirbelsäule, 1890 - On compression-myelitis in caries of the spine.
- Beiträge zur pathologischen Anatomie der Rückenmarkserschütterung, 1890 - Contribution to the pathological anatomy of spinal cord concussions.
- Über den Ausgang der cyanotischen Induration der Niere in Granularatrophie, 1893 - On cyanotic induration of the kidney in granular atrophy.
- Zur Frage der Coagulations nekrose (with Eugen Albrecht), 1899 - On coagulative necrosis.
