= Penny Colman =

American non-fiction writer (born 1944)

- Born: Penelope Granger Morgan; September 2, 1944 (age 82); Denver, Colorado
- Education: Western College for Women; The University of Michigan; Johns Hopkins University
- Writing career
- Genre: Non-fiction
- Subject: Women
- Website: www.pennycolman.com

Penny Colman (born September 2, 1944) is an American author of books, essays, stories, and articles for all ages. In 2005, her social history, Corpses, Coffins, and Crypts: A History of Burial, was named one of the 100 Best of the Best Books for the 21st Century by members of the Young Adult Library Services Association (YALSA), a division of the American Library Association (ALA).

== Early life ==
Penny Colman was born Penelope Granger Morgan on September 2, 1944, in Denver, Colorado, to her father, Norman Charles Morgan, and her mother, Marija (known as Maritza) Leskovar Morgan. She lived in Seattle, Washington, Portland, Oregon, and Lexington, Kentucky, before her parents settled in North Warren, Pennsylvania, in 1949. Here, Colman, her parents, and her three brothers, all lived on the grounds of Warren State Hospital, a mental hospital where her father worked as a psychiatrist.

In 1953, when Colman was nine years old, her parents bought a farm 6 miles (10 km) from the hospital. This same year, Colman's mother joined the staff of the local newspaper as a photographer and journalist and her father began writing a weekly column, "Everyday Psychology," for several newspapers.

In 1962, Colman graduated from high school and in the fall she attended Western College for Women in Oxford, Ohio. After two years of college, Colman dropped out of college and decided to hitchhike through Europe. After she returned from Europe, her older brother Jon died from viral pneumonia at the age of twenty and her father died three years later from terminal cancer.

Despite hardship, Colman graduated from The University of Michigan; and earned a Master of Arts in teaching from Johns Hopkins University. She married Robert "Bob" Colman and had three sons, Jonathan, and twins; David and Stephen. After twenty-five years, Colman and her husband were divorced. In 2005, she lived in Englewood, New Jersey.

== Non-fiction writing genre ==
External videos
- Pioneering Women War Correspondents by Penny Colman, YouTube video

Colman writes predominantly in the genre of non-fiction and most often about women. She attributes her interest in the genre to parental influence. During Penny Colman's youth, her mother worked as a newspaper photojournalist and Colman accompanied her on various assignments. Colman’s father, a psychiatrist, wrote a weekly column that appeared in several newspapers. Immersed in these experiences during her formative years, she developed a belief “that nonfiction is a valuable vehicle for sharing true stories and discussing issues and ideas". Throughout her childhood, Colman enjoyed family visits to museums, historical sites, and landmarks igniting an interest in history that continues today. She recognized the void in the historical record of women’s accomplishments and their subsequent impact on the nation (USA). She has written twelve nonfiction books concerning women’s struggles, achievements and contributions beginning to fill that void. Her latest book, Elizabeth Cady Stanton and Susan B. Anthony: A Friendship that Changed History due for release March 2011, continues the effort. In her book, Adventurous Women: Eight True Stories about Women Who Made a Difference, Colman defines her objective in this manner, "My intent is not to replace men but to add women." All of her books require extensive and meticulous research conducted solely by Colman and often includes "shoe leather research". Colman explains her motivations for becoming a writer, "I became a writer because there are things that I have to say. Things that I have to write. Things that I feel passionate about, such as the importance of thinking and learning, of equality and justice, and of sharing and caring".

Rosie the Riveter: Women Working on the Home Front in World War II received the Orbis Pictus Honor Award for Outstanding Nonfiction from the NCTE and an International Reading Association’s Teachers’ Choice and Young Adult Choice.

Her book of essays, Adventurous Women: Eight True Stories About Women Who Made A Difference, was named a Notable Trade Book. Since 2003, Colman has been a distinguished lecturer at Queens College, the City University of New York. Her academic writings include, “A New Way to Look at Literature: A Visual Model for Analyzing Fiction and Nonfiction Texts,” Language Arts, 2007. She was honored by the women of the New Jersey State Legislature for books and public appearances that have "contributed to the advancement of women."

== Notable works ==
Adventurous Women: Eight True Stories about Women Who Made a Difference, is a collection of eight enriching and inspirational stories of pioneering 19th century women. The book provides a rich and compelling look at the heroic lives of eight American women from racially and ethically diverse backgrounds who defied the odds to become historic figures. Adventurous Women profiles are Louise Boyd, Arctic explorer; Mary Gibson Henry, botanist; Juana Briones, Hispanic landowner; Alice Hamilton, medicine pioneer; Mary McLeod Bethune, educator, Katherine Wormeley, Civil War nurse, and Peggy Hull, reporter. The book details how all eight women rose above the gender stereotypes and social limitations of their time to achieve immeasurable success in their respective fields.

The book is a favorite among critics for young readers because of its easy to read style and focus on little known women history. Adventurous Women is listed on several independent and library reading lists for school age readers.

Corpses, Coffins, and Crypts: A History of Burial is an illustrated social history of the subjects of death and burial across cultures written by Penny Colman. The comprehensive text, enriched with true stories both humorous and poignant, includes a list of burial sites of famous people, images in the arts associated with death, fascinating epitaphs and gravestone carvings, a chronology and a glossary, and over a hundred black-and-white photographs, most of which were taken by the author. It was named one of the 100 Best of the Best Books for the 21st Century by the Young Adult Library Services Association, a division of the American Library Association.

Rosie the Riveter: Women Working on The Home Front In World War II is an illustrated social history of the lives and contributions of women workers during World War II written by Penny Colman. There are more than sixty archival black-and-white photographs (including one of Norma Jeane Baker Dougherty, who later changed her name to Marilyn Monroe), famous posters, advertisements, and cartoons. The author explains the origins of the phrase "Rosie the Riveter." There are a Select List of Women's Wartime Jobs, Facts & Figures about Women War Workers, Chronology, and an extensive bibliography. Rosie the Riveter received the Orbis Pictus Honor Award for Outstanding Nonfiction and an International Reading Association’s Teachers’ Choice and Young Adult Choice.

== Bibliography ==
- — (1992). Breaking the chains: The crusade of Dorothea Lynde Dix. White Hall, Virginia: Shoe Tree Press. ISBN 978-1-55870-219-6. OCLC 23870188. Republished as — (2007). Breaking the chains: The crusade of Dorothea Lynde Dix. Lincoln, Nebraska: ASJA Press / iUniverse. ISBN 978-0-595-43714-6. OCLC 166343814.
- — (1992). Spies! : Women in the Civil War. Cincinnati: Betterway Books. ISBN 978-1-55870-267-7. OCLC 26012990.
- — (1993). A Woman Unafraid: The Achievements of Frances Perkins. ISBN 978-0-689-31853-5.
- — (1993). Fannie Lou Hamer and the Fight for the Vote..
- — (1994). Madame C.J. Walker: Building a business empire. Gateway biography. Millbrook Press. ISBN 978-1-56294-338-7. OCLC 28499950.
- — (1994). Mother Jones and the March of the Mill Children..
- — (1994). Toilets, Bathtubs, Sinks, and Sewers: A History of the Bathroom. ISBN 978-0-689-31894-8.
- — (1995). Rosie the riveter: Women working on the home front in World War II. Knopf Books for Young Readers. Crown Publishers. ISBN 978-0-517-59790-3. OCLC 30894677.
- — (1995). Strike: The Bitter Struggle of American Workers from Colonial Times to the Present..
- — (1997). Corpses, coffins, and crypts: A history of burial. Henry Holt and Company. ISBN 978-0-8050-5066-0.
- — (2000). Girls: A history of growing up female in America. New York City: Scholastic Reference. ISBN 978-0-439-22234-1. OCLC 41315427.
- — (2002). Where the Action Was: Women War Correspondents in World War II. ISBN 978-0-517-80075-1.
- — (2006-03-07). Adventurous women: Eight true stories about women who made a difference. New York City: Henry Holt and Company. ISBN 978-0-8050-7744-5.
- — (2008). Thanksgiving: The true story. Henry Holt and Company (BYR). ISBN 978-0-8050-8229-6.
- — (2011-05-10). Elizabeth Cady Stanton and Susan B. Anthony: A friendship that changed the world. New York City: Christy Ottaviano Books / Henry Holt and Company. ISBN 978-0-8050-8293-7.

== Awards ==
Awards for Rosie the Riveter: Women Working on the Home Front in World War II

- A School Library Journal Best Book of the Year
- A Junior Library Guild Selection
- An IRA Teachers’ Choice
- An IRA Young Adult Choice
- An NCTE Orbis Pictus Honor Book for Outstanding Nonfiction
- An ALA Best Book for Young Adults
- An ALA Notable Children’s Book
- A Bulletin Blue Ribbon Book
- A New York Public Library Book for the Teen Age.

Awards for Girls: A History of Growing up Female in America

- Honored by the Women of the New Jersey State Legislature
- Parents' Choice Awards, 2000
- Book of the Month Club selection, 2000
- Best Book for the Teen Age List, New York Public Library, 2001

Awards for Where the Action Was: Women War Correspondents in World War II

- ALA Notable Children's Book citation, American Library Association, 2003
- Notable Children's Trade Book in the Social Studies, CSC/CBC

Awards for Toilets, Bathtubs, Sinks and Sewers: A History of the Bathroom

- Children's Book of the Year Awards
- Child Study Association and Bank Street College of Education Recommended Book for Reluctant Readers citation

Award for A Woman Un-afraid: The Achievements of Frances Perkins

- Notable Children's Trade Book in the Social Studies, CSC/CBC

Award for Mother Jones and the March of the Mill Children

- Notable Children's Trade Book in the Social Studies, CSC/CBC

Award for Strike!: The Bitter Struggle of American Workers from Colonial Times to the Present

- Notable Children's Trade Book in the Social Studies, CSC/CBC

Additional Honors

- Lidman Prize Competition, Silver Award, 1990, for Stamps
- Paula A. Witty Short Story Award nomination, International Reading Association for But Not Ms. Anderson
- Best Book of the Year citation, Publishers Weekly, for Corpses, Coffins, and Crypts: A History of Burial
- The American Library Association Best of the Best for the Twenty-first Century
- International Reading Association Teacher's Choice and Young Readers' Choice
- Publishers Weekly and School Library Journal Best Book of the Year
- National Council of English Teacher's Orbis Pictures Honor Award for Outstanding Nonfiction
