= West Virginia Equal Suffrage Association =

American women's suffrage organization

- Abbreviation: WVESA
- Successor: League of Women Voters of West Virginia
- Formation: 1895
- Dissolved: 1920
- Parent organization: National American Woman Suffrage Association
- Formerly called: West Virginia Woman Suffrage Association

The West Virginia Equal Suffrage Association (WVESA) was an organization formed on November 29, 1895, at a conference in Grafton, West Virginia. This conference and the subsequent annual conventions were an integral part of the National American Woman Suffrage Association's Southern Committee's work to reach into previously under-represented areas for supporting the women's suffrage movement. The WVESA relied not only on the national association but also worked together with activists from the state's chapter of the Woman's Christian Temperance Union, state chapter of the General Federation of Women's Clubs, and the clubs affiliated with the National Association of Colored Women's Clubs to win the right to vote. Though they lost in a landslide the 1916 referendum to amend the state's constitution for women's suffrage, the group provided the strong push for ratifying the federal amendment in spring 1920 that led to West Virginia becoming the thirty-fourth of the thirty-six states needed. That fall, West Virginia women voted for the first time ever, and the WVESA transformed itself into the League of Women Voters of West Virginia.

== Background ==
When West Virginia formed as a state in 1863, women's suffrage was not included in the new constitution. In 1867 while the American Equal Rights Association (AERA) was in full force, West Virginia State Senator Samuel Young proposed a bill advocating the enfranchisement of women "who can read the Declaration of Independence intelligently, and write a legible hand, and have actually paid tax the year previous to their proposing to vote." His bill did not get any supporters. Then in February 1869, Senator Young wrote an open letter to the National Woman Suffrage Association's newspaper The Revolution to report that he had again proposed a bill for women's suffrage and he named the eight out of twenty-two senators who had voted in favor of it. He also reported that the eight senators had voted to invite Anna E. Dickinson to lecture at the state-house while she was there in the state presenting at Wheeling, West Virginia. Despite this early attempt in the legislature, woman suffrage did not gain any traction in the following decades.

== Founding Convention ==
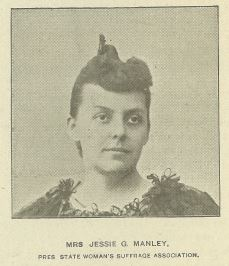
Florence Jessie Grove Manley (1858–1940) of Fairmont, West Virginia

Since the founding of the Southern Committee led by Carrie Chapman Catt and Laura Clay, the National American Woman Suffrage Association (NAWSA) began working on changing the minds of southern legislators at both the state and federal levels. West Virginia was a target state, and by 1895, NAWSA funded a visit by Annie L. Diggs of Kansas in the spring who reported "the question was too new to make any organization possible." That fall, NAWSA's national organizer Mary Garrett Hay and the Rev. Henrietta G. Moore of Ohio spent two weeks in a series of meetings that led to the formation of several clubs in the northern part of the state. They then organized the call by the NAWSA for a statewide convention at the courthouse in Grafton, West Virginia, on November 25-26, 1895. The suffrage association formed at that meeting then elected the founding board of officers: President, Mrs. Jessie G. Manley; Vice-president, Mr. Harvey W. Harmer; Corresponding secretary, Mrs. Annie Caldwell Boyd; Recording secretary, Mrs. L.M. Fay; Treasurer, Mrs. K.H. De Woody; Auditors, Mrs. M. Caswell and Mrs. Louise Harden. After that meeting, Rev. Moore came to Fairmont to give a lecture at the Fairmont Normal School hall and the Fairmont suffrage club formed. A total of nine local clubs affiliated with the state organization in that first month, and President Manley reported to the NAWSA convention in 1896 the following clubs with its official number of members: Wheeling, 22; Benwood, 8; Wellsburg, 12; New Cumberland, 2; New Martinsville, 9; Clarksburg, 39; Grafton, 21; Fairmont, 43; and Mannington, 43.

== Annual Conventions ==
After the founding meeting in 1895, the WVESA relied on Fairmont to organize and host the second convention which took place in January 1897. Carrie Chapman Catt, chair of the NAWSA organizing committee and close friend of Mary Garrett Hay, took a personal interest in supporting the process and presented at the convention as well. Mrs. Manley stepped down as president and a new executive board was elected: President, Mrs. Fannie J. Wheat, Vice-president, Mrs. Mackie M. Holbert; Recording secretary, Mrs. Beulah Boyd Ritchie; Auditors, Mrs. Mary Long Parson and Mrs. Mary Butcher; member to the National Executive Committee, Mrs. Mary H. Grove; and, the corresponding secretary (Annie Caldwell Boyd) and treasurer (Mrs. K.H. De Woody) retained their posts.

Annual conventions thereafter followed:

- April 1898 in Wheeling
- Fall 1899 in Fairmont (Beulah Boyd Ritchie elected president)
- December 1900 in Fairmont
- August 1904 in Moundsville (M. Anna Hall elected president)
- October 1905 in Fairmont (Mrs. Anne M. Southern elected president)
- October 1906 in Wheeling (Dr. Harriet B. Jones elected president)
- November 1907 in Wheeling (Mrs. May Hornbrook elected president)
- October 1908 in Fairmont
- October 1909 in Wheeling
- October 1911 in Fairmont (Mrs. Allie Haymond elected president)
- October 1913 in Wheeling (Miss Margaret McKinney elected president)
- November 1915 in Huntington (Mrs. J. Gale Ebert then Mrs. Lenna Lowe Yost in 1916 elected president)
- November 1917 in Fairmont (Mrs. John L. Ruhl elected president)
- April 1919 in Charleston

=== Ratification Committee ===
In the fall of 1919, WVESA president Ruhl appointed Lenna Lowe Yost to chair a Ratification Committee that organized a statewide petition drive and gathered together an Advisory Board of 150 men and women from various parts of the state to support their lobbying efforts. Yost led the strategy that positioned individual activists with each legislator as they came to the special session called by Governor John J. Cornwell in February 1920. This personal attention and insistence to bolster one-on-one interactions overcame the stiff opposition and the legislature sent its ratification of the federal amendment to the Governor for signature on March 10, 1920.

== Transition into the League of Women Voters ==
On September 30, 1920, the WVESA officially transformed into the League of Women Voters of West Virginia. Mrs. Ruhl, president of the WVESA, was elected the founding chairman.

== See also ==
- History of West Virginia
- Lenna Lowe Yost
- National American Woman Suffrage Association

== Bibliography ==
- Stanton, Elizabeth Cady; Anthony, Susan B.; Gage, Matilda Joslyn, eds. (1886). "VII. West Virginia". The History of Woman Suffrage, Vol. 3, 1876-1885. Rochester, NY: Susan B. Anthony. pp. 824–825. hdl:2027/nyp.33433075965669.
- Boyd, Annie Caldwell (1902). "LXX. West Virginia". In Anthony, Susan B.; Harper, Ida Husted (eds.). The History of Woman Suffrage, Vol. IV, 1883-1900. Rochester, N.Y.: Susan B. Anthony. pp. 980–984. hdl:2027/coo.31924052143595.
- Jones, Dr. Harriet B.; Yost, Lenna Lowe (1922). "XLVII. West Virginia". In Harper, Ida Husted (ed.). The History of Woman Suffrage, Vol. VI, 1900-1920. New York: National American Woman Suffrage Association. pp. 687–698. hdl:2027/uc1.31210013897713.
- Effland, Anne Wallace. "The Woman Suffrage Movement in West Virginia, 1867-1920", M.A. thesis, West Virginia University, 1983". The Research Repository@WVU.
- Thurston, Karina G. "Lenna Lowe Yost, temperance, and the ratification of the woman suffrage amendment by West Virginia" (2009). M.A. Thesis, West Virginia University. The Research Repository@WVU.
