= Basnettville, West Virginia =

Unincorporated community in West Virginia, US

Coordinates: 39°35′10″N 80°14′08″W

Basnettville is an unincorporated community in Marion County, in the U.S. state of West Virginia.

== History ==
A post office called Basnettville was established in 1849, the name was changed to Basnett in 1880, and the post office closed in 1903. Basnettville most likely has the name of the local Basnett family, a member of which kept a store there. Saint Johns Cemetery, next to the church, is sometimes referred to as Basnettsville Cemetery because Samuel Basnett (1776–1852) donated the land for the cemetery.

== Notable person ==
Suffragist Lenna Lowe Yost was a native of Basnettville.
