= Conewago =

Conewago may refer to:

== Communities ==
- Conewago Township, Pennsylvania (disambiguation)

== Streams ==
- Conewago Creek (west), in Adams and York Counties, Pennsylvania
- Conewago Creek (east), Pennsylvania
- Conewago Falls, an historic falls flanking Three Mile Island near Harrisburg, Pennsylvania
