= Sonthofen =

- Town
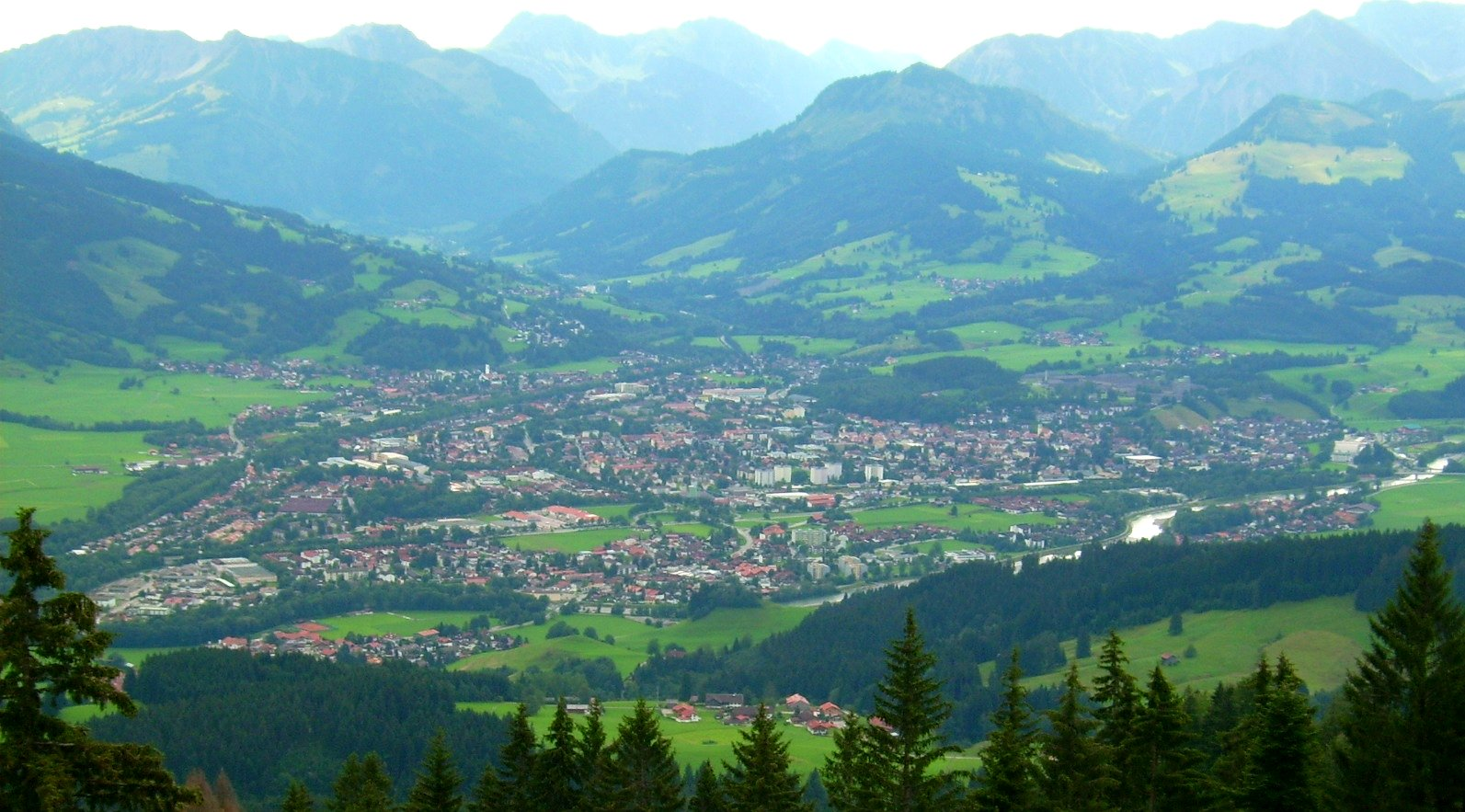
- Sonthofen

- Coat of arms

- Location of Sonthofen within Oberallgäu district
- Interactive map of Sonthofen
- Location within Germany Location within Bavaria
- Coordinates: 47°30′57″N 10°16′52″E
- Country: Germany
- State: Bavaria
- Admin. region: Schwaben
- District: Oberallgäu

Government
  - Mayor (2020–26): Christian Wilhelm (FW)

Area
  - Total: 46.55 km^{2} (17.97 sq mi)
- Elevation: 750–1,100 m (2,460–3,610 ft)

Population (2025-12-31)
  - Total: 21,641
  - Density: 464.9/km^{2} (1,204/sq mi)
- Time zone: UTC+01:00 (CET)
  - Summer (DST): UTC+02:00 (CEST)
- Postal codes: 87527
- Dialling codes: 08321
- Vehicle registration: OA
- Website: www.stadt-sonthofen.de

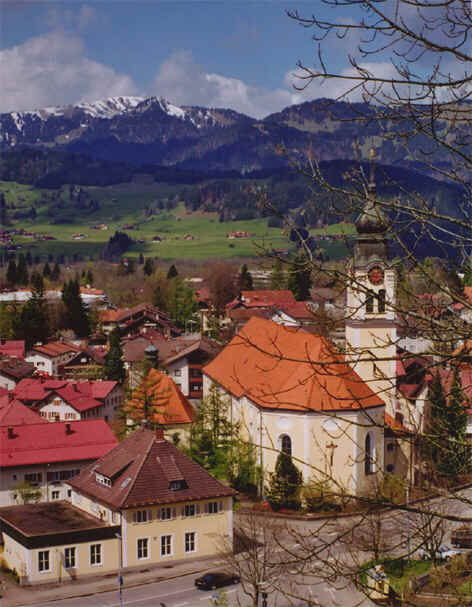
Sonthofen

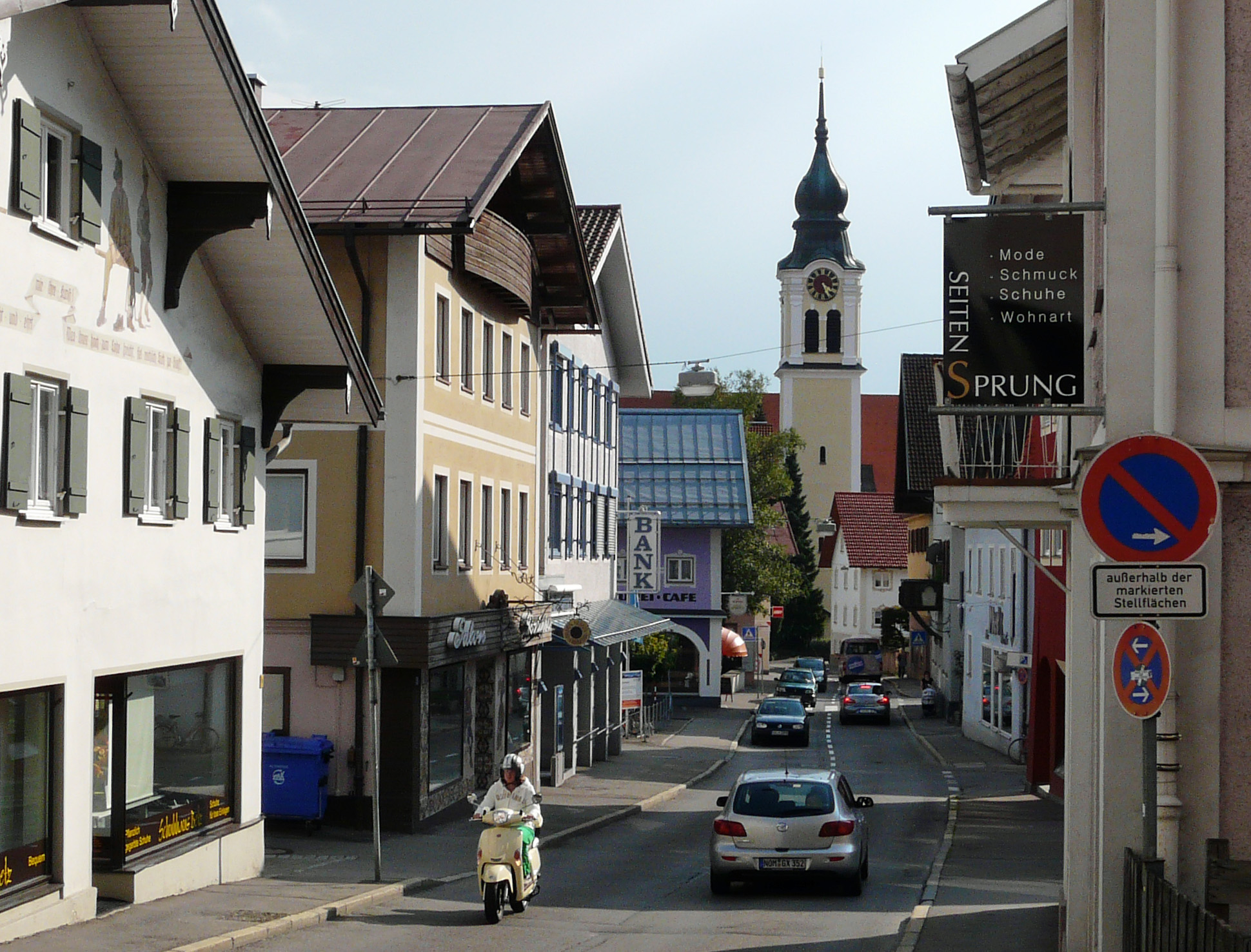
Marktstraße (main street downtown)

Sonthofen (German pronunciation: [zɔntˈhoːfn̩]) is the southernmost town of Germany, located in the Oberallgäu region of the Bavarian Alps. Neighbouring Oberstdorf is situated 14 km farther south but is classified as a market town. In 2005, Sonthofen was awarded "Alpenstadt des Jahres" (Alpine town of the year). The town has 21,300 inhabitants (as of 31 December 2015).

Sonthofen is widely known for its milk and cheese products and as a tourist destination.

== History ==
Findings show that the Sonthofen area was already inhabited from the Stone Age to the Roman Empire. In the 6th/7th century, Germanic Alamans settled in the area.

Sonthofen was first mentioned in a document in 1145. It had held the market right with important proprietary rights since 1429.

In 1803, when the Prince-Bishopric of Augsburg was mediatised, Sonthofen came to Bavaria. In 1804 Sonthof Castle becomes the seat of a Bavarian Landgericht (regional court) responsible for justice and administration.

In 1963 the previous market town of Sonthofen is given the town charter. In 1972 Sonthofen becomes the county seat of the newly formed district of Oberallgäu.

In World War II Sonthofen was bombed twice because Adolf Hitler had built the Ordensburg Sonthofen, where young boys were trained for service in Nazi Party organizations. The "Ordensburg" was not destroyed in the war. From 1946 to 1948 it was home to the United States Constabulary school, from May 1951 through February 1952, was used by the United States Air Force in Europe as a basic training center, and from 1956 to 2009 the German Bundeswehr located its Military Police (Feldjäger) and Staff Service School there. The German Army's NBC Defence School (ABC-Abwehr- und Selbstschutzschule) is located in another barracks in Sonthofen.

== Main sights ==
Green areas

- Ökokurpark (ecological spa park): Next to the Kalvarienberg is the ecological spa park on a steep terrain. It houses a wetland biotope, native plants and information boards on flora and fauna.
- Another park is located in the so-called G'hau an der Iller, where there is also a miniature golf course and a playground.

Buildings

- Burgruine Fluhenstein (castle ruin), 1361 and around 1500/01
- The Catholic church St. Beaz is located below the Kalvarienberg. Predecessor buildings probably already existed in the 9th century.
- The Old School was turned into a town hall by the prince-bishop Sunny of Augsburg in 1472. Today it is used as a music school and public library.
- The Generaloberst-Beck-Kazerne (former Ordensburg Sonthofen, built 1934). Today in use as army baracks, not open to public.

Natural monuments

- The Starzlachklamm (a gorge) near the district Winkel, since 1932 accessible for hikers

Museum

- Heimathaus Sonthofen: history and culture of the region

=== Gallery ===
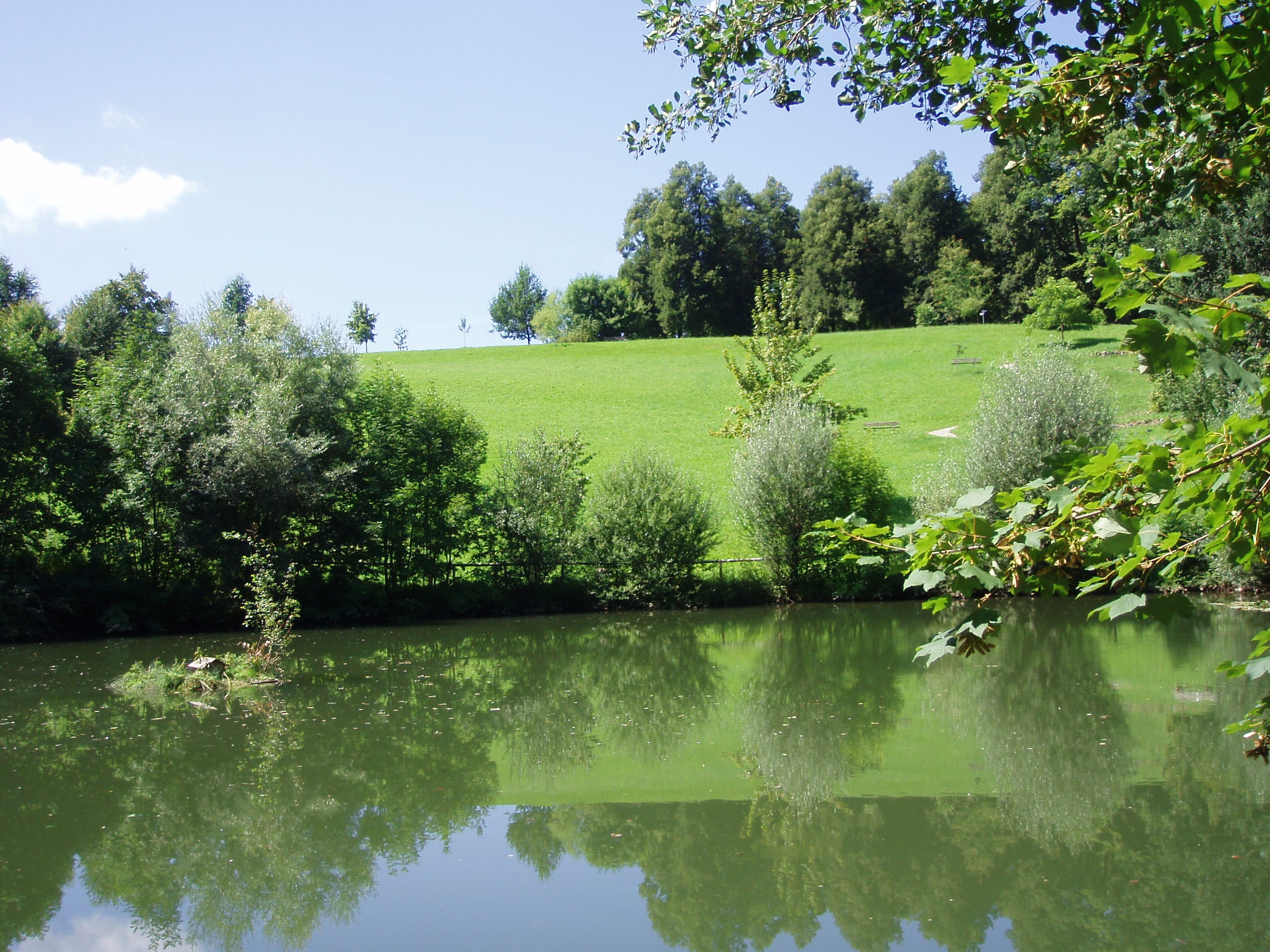
Ökokurpark

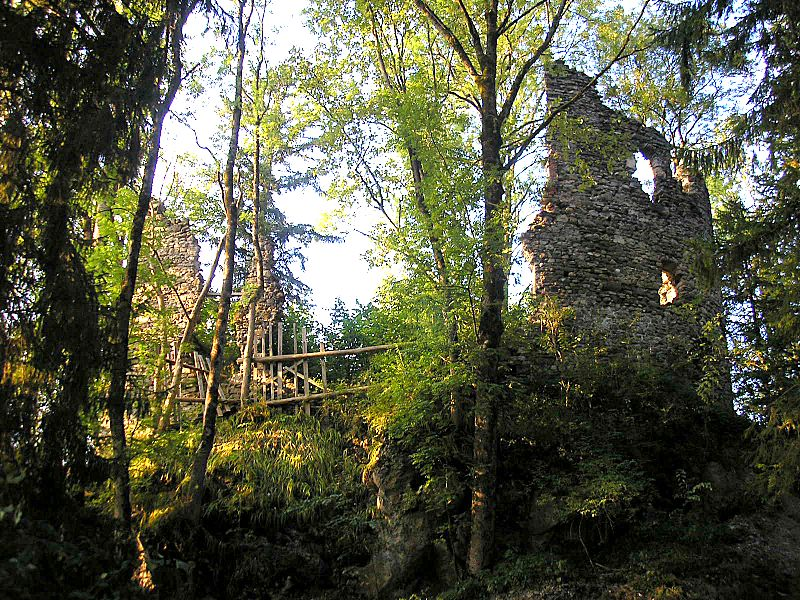
Burgruine Fluhenstein

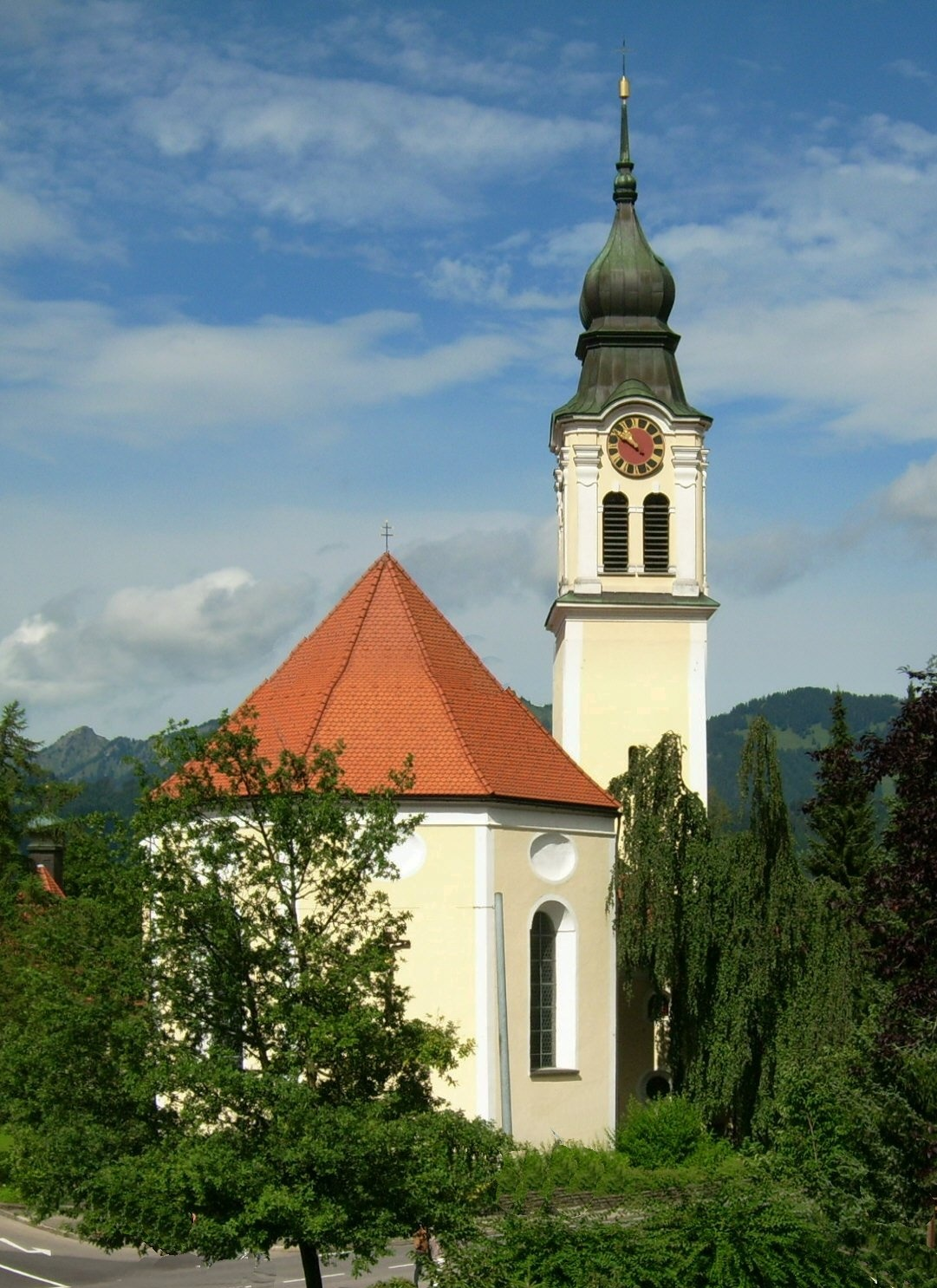
Catholic church St. Michael

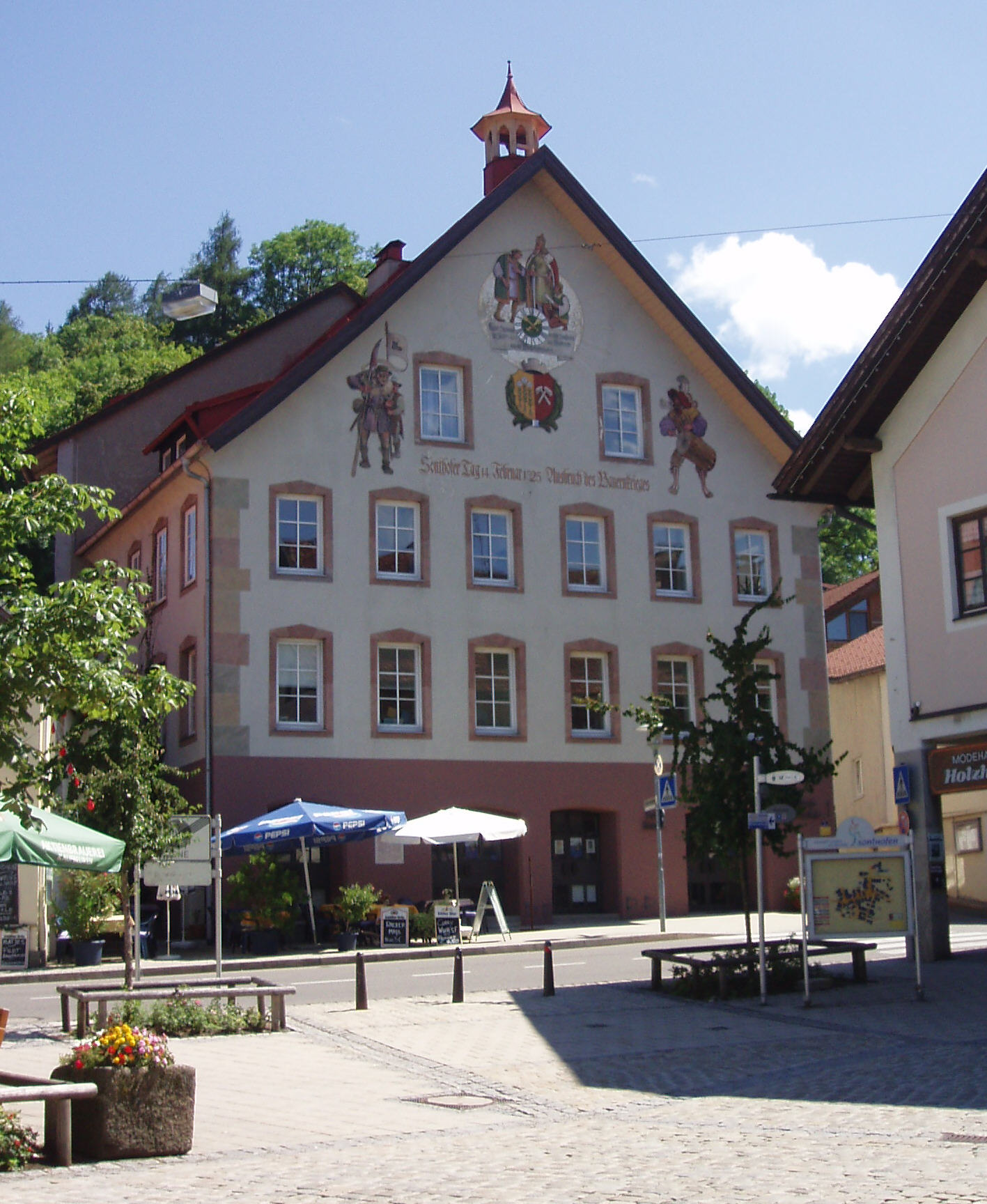
The Old School

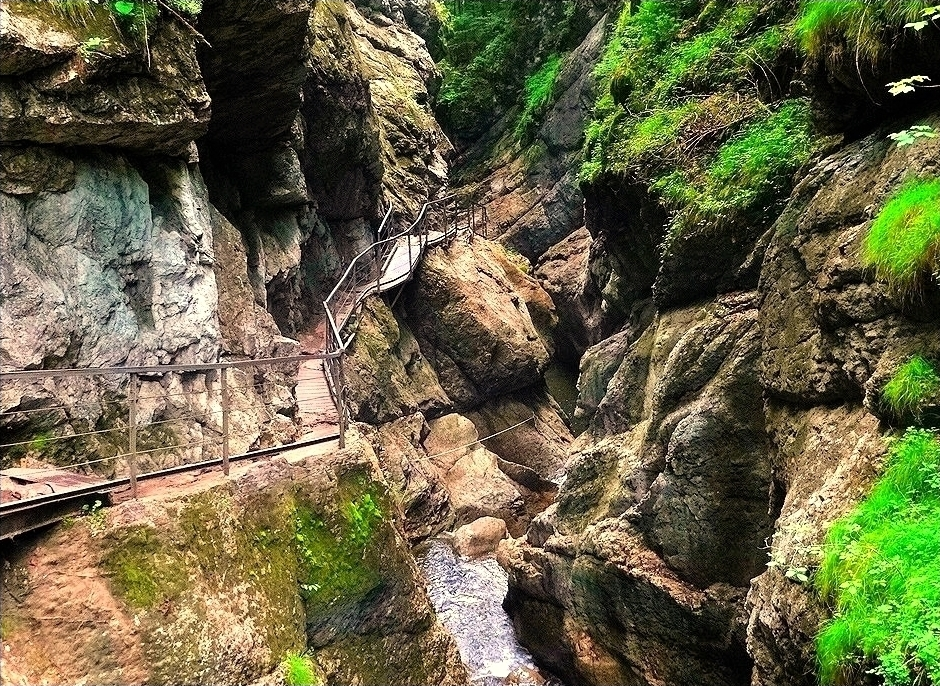
The Starzachklamm

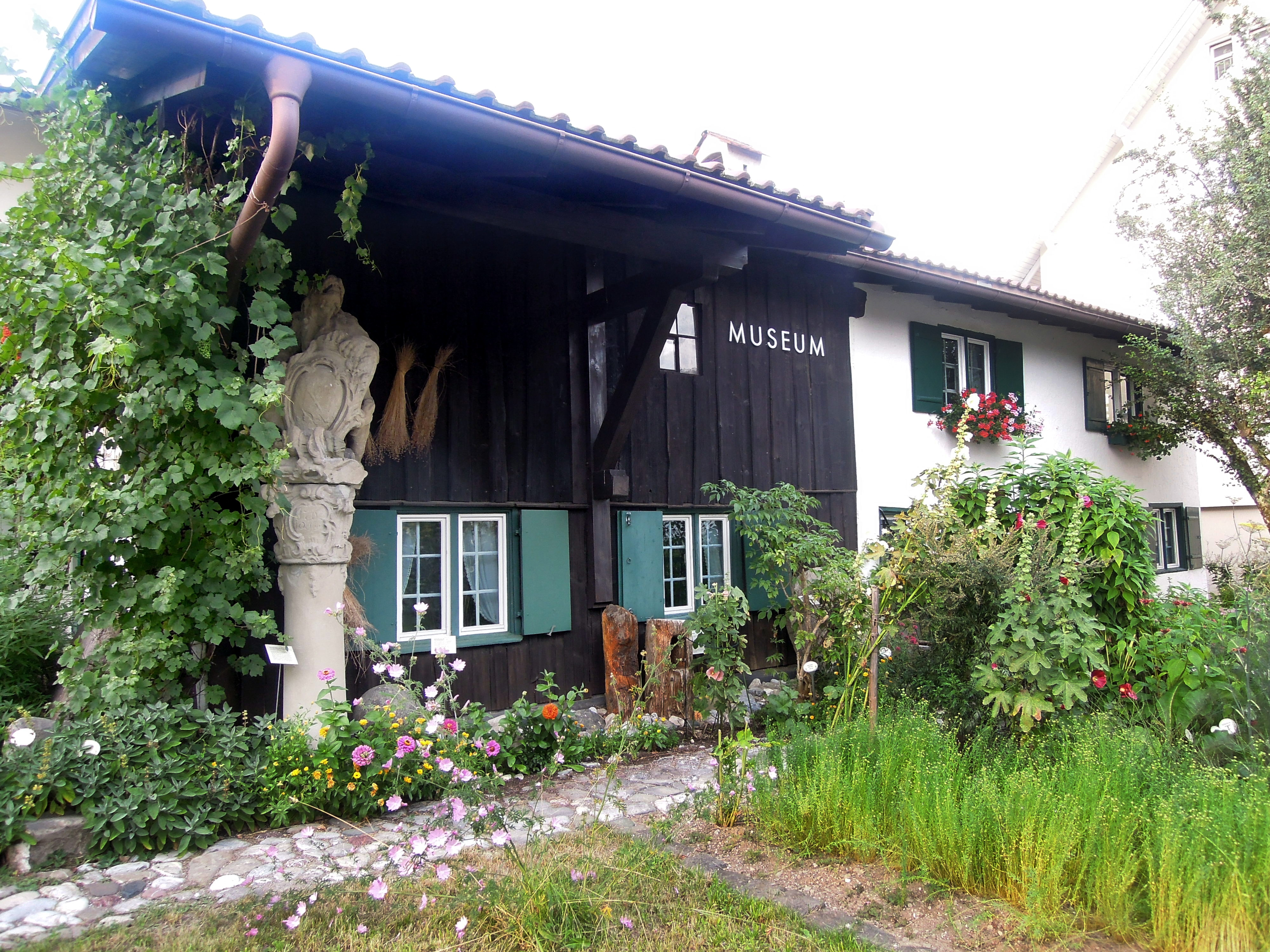
Heimathaus Sonthofen

== Notable people ==
- Eugen Albrecht (1872–1908), pathologist
- Philip Bester, Canadian tennis player, born in Sonthofen
- Michael Buthe, artist
- Michael Endres, pianist
- Josef Enzensberger, (1914–1975), Luftwaffe Fighter Ace 1939–1945, born in Sonthofen
- Herbert Knaup, actor, born in Sonthofen
- Hardy Krüger, actor, spent his childhood in Sonthofen
- W.G. Sebald, writer, lived in Sonthofen from 1948 to 1963

== Awards and associations ==
With other Alpine towns, Sonthofen engages in the Alpine Town of the Year Association for the implementation of the Alpine Convention to achieve sustainable development in the Alpine Arc. Sonthofen was awarded Alpine Town of the Year 2005.
