= Julius Schmidt (chemist) =

Chemist

- Born: 26 February 1872
- Died: 29 April 1933 (aged 61)
- Education: University of Jena
- Scientific career
- Fields: Chemistry
- Workplaces: University of Stuttgart
- Doctoral advisor: Ludwig Knorr

Julius Schmidt (26 February 1872 – 29 March 1933) was a German chemist.

== Career ==
Schmidt studied chemistry at the University of Jena, where he was a student of Ludwig Knorr. In 1900 he became an associate professor in organic chemistry at the University of Stuttgart. His research focused on nitroso compounds, oximes and quinones and derivatives of phenanthrene and fluorene. In addition, Schmidt was director of the chemistry laboratory at the higher mechanical engineering school in Esslingen.

Schmidt published numerous works on alkaloids, pyrazoles and organic magnesium compounds. In addition to textbooks, he published a handbook of organic chemistry and a yearbook of organic chemistry.

He was the father of the biochemist Gerhard Schmidt.
