= Einar Lundsgaard =

Danish physiologist (1899-1968)

Einar Lundsgaard (12 February 1899 – 18 December 1968) was a Danish professor of physiology at the University of Copenhagen (1934–1967). He was among the first to demonstrate that muscles contractions drew their energy from dephosphorylization of creatine phosphate when glycolysis was inhibited using iodoacetate.

== Life and work ==
Lundsgaard was born in Copenhagen where his father was a physician who came from the Gundelach family of lawyers and civil servants His father received a gold medal for his work on prostatic hypertrophy from the University of Copenhagen. At school he played guitar as a hobby. In 1917 he completed school and entered medical studies. He completed studies in 1923 and worked at the institute of medical physiology under Valdemar Henriques. He received a doctorate in 1929. His major finding was on muscle contraction when glycolysis was blocked by mono-iodoacetate. He found that energy was drawn from the phosphate bond energy and he published the findings in 1930. Until then it was believed that glycolysis was the main source of energy. Creatine phosphate was independently identified in muscle by the Eggletons and by Cyrus H. Fiske and Subbarow in 1926. From 1934 he began to work on phlorizin and its metabolic effects. This was continued with insulin in studies of perfused livers. In 1938 he examined the metabolism of alcohol and its conversion to acetic acid by the liver. He received the Thunberg medal in 1960 and the Anders Jahre prize for 1964. Herman Kalckar was among his students.

He retired in 1967 and died from renal cancer the next year.
