= Lenna Lowe Yost =

American suffragist (1878–1972)

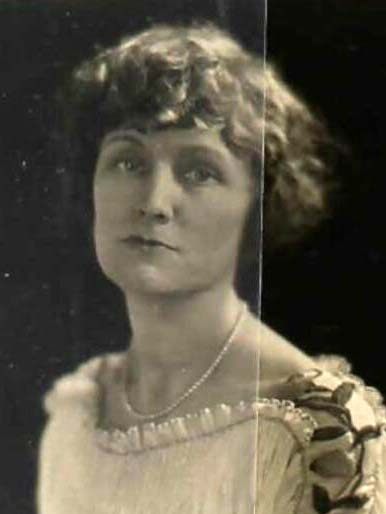
- Born: January 25, 1878; Basnettville, West Virginia, US
- Died: May 6, 1972 (aged 94); Alexandria, Virginia, US
- Occupation(s): Suffragist, temperance leader, clubwoman
- Spouse: Ellis Asby Yost (1872–1962)

Lenna Lowe Yost (January 25, 1878 – May 6, 1972), president of the West Virginia Equal Suffrage Association (WVESA) during the state woman suffrage referendum campaign of 1916 and chairman of the WVESA Ratification Committee during the national amendment ratification campaign of 1920. Yost was at the time also the state president of the West Virginia Woman's Christian Temperance Union, thus being the only woman in the nation to serve as both president of temperance and of the suffrage club at the same time. Yost was the first woman to be appointed to the state Board of Education, and the first woman to chair the West Virginia Republic Party convention.

== Background ==
Born January 25, 1878, to Columbia S. Basnett (1851–1939) and Jonathon S. Lowe (1840–1886), Lenna Lowe Basnett was their third child of four. Her siblings were Fred H. (1873–1958) and Petrolia (who died in childhood) and Glenn Andrew (1883–1953). She was raised in Basnettville, a small town in Marion County where her father worked as a sewing machine agent. She studied art at Ohio Northern University and graduated from West Virginia Wesleyan College in Buckhannon.

She met Ellis Asby Yost (1872–1962) of Fairview, West Virginia. They married on September 25, 1899, and they had one son, Leland Lowe Yost (August 29, 1902 - February 24, 1976). Ellis Yost became a lawyer and then a state senator; his older brother Fielding H. Yost became a famous football coach.

== Leadership in Woman's Christian Temperance Union ==
Yost became active in the Morgantown Woman's Christian Temperance Union (WCTU) soon after her son's birth, and Yost became president of the state WCTU in 1908. In 1918, she left the presidency to accept a national WCTU role as Washington correspondent of that organization's journal, The Union Signal.

== Suffrage work ==
At the same time as she rose in the ranks of the nation's largest women's club, Yost became interested in furthering the suffrage movement in West Virginia, and she joined the Morgantown chapter of the West Virginia Equal Suffrage Association (WVESA) in 1905. She was a member of the Daughters of the American Revolution through her maternal grandmother's ancestry.

In 1913 her husband Ellis A. Yost presented a woman suffrage amendment in the House of Delegates. It passed the House by a vote of 58 to 25; but, in the Senate, with a barrage of amendments (including one to limit women to school suffrage only), the bill never achieved the two-thirds majority required to send the state constitutional amendment to the voters.

Yost became president of the state suffrage organization in 1916. This was the first time that the president of the state's WCTU was also the president of the state suffrage association.

Yost conducted a vigorous, although unsuccessful, state referendum campaign; and stepped down as president as she returned to her work for the national WCTU. She kept up with the state's suffrage movement, however, and served as the West Virginia delegate to the National Executive Committee of the National American Woman Suffrage Association (NAWSA).

Yost served the state organization again in 1920 as leader of its campaign to secure ratification by the West Virginia legislature of the federal woman suffrage amendment. As Chairman of the WVESA Ratification Committee, Yost organized a statewide petition drive to support woman suffrage and in late February 1920 organized a “living petition” compiled of a small delegation of women from each district ready to greet legislators as they arrived in Charleston for a special session called by the governor.

== After 1920 ==
Following the success of this amendment, Yost joined the Republican Party, in which her husband, an attorney, was also active throughout his life. She served on the West Virginia platform committee, as the West Virginia Women's Activities Director as an active campaigner during the presidential races of the 1920s, and eventually as Director of the Women's Division of the national party.

Yost also continued her work with the Woman's Christian Temperance Union. She wrote a weekly Washington letter for the Union Signal until 1930. She attended international conferences on alcoholism in 1921 (Switzerland) and 1923 (Denmark).

In 1922 Yost became the first woman member of the West Virginia State Board of Education, and for twelve years championed the improvement of girl's and women's education. She pushed for the establishment of a women's physical education building at West Virginia University, allied with the American Association of University Women, fought for equal pay and rank for women faculty. In addition, she served on the board of directors of the federal women's prison at Alderson.

In 1927 Yost became the first woman to serve on the West Virginia Wesleyan College Board of Trustees. According to the U.S. Census in 1930, Yost was living in Huntington with her husband and she was still a salaried national representative for the WCTU.

== Death ==
On May 6, 1972, Yost was admitted to the Jefferson Memorial Hospital in Alexandria, Virginia. She died within thirty minutes of arrival, cause of death listed as arteriosclerotic heart disease. She was buried in the Saint Johns Cemetery in Marion County, West Virginia, next to her husband.

Yost's personal papers were donated to the West Virginia and Regional History Collection at West Virginia University by a cousin, Mrs. Virginia Brock Neptune.

A state historical marker celebrating her political career was erected by the West Virginia Division of Archives and History in 2005. The marker can be found at junction of WV218 & CR17, Basnettville.

== See also ==
- Beulah Boyd Ritchie
- National American Woman Suffrage Association
- West Virginia Equal Suffrage Association
- Woman's Christian Temperance Union

== Resources ==
- Lenna Lowe Yost to Carrie Chapman Catt, 10 March 1920, National American Woman Suffrage Association (NAWSA) Records, Manuscripts Division, New York Public Library (NYPL), New York, NY.
- "Lenna Lowe Yost (Mrs. Ellis A. Yost): West Virginia Political and Government Leader," Lenna Lowe Yost Papers, West Virginia and Regional History Collection, West Virginia University Library, Morgantown, WV [hereafter WVRHC].
- Anne Wallace Effland, '"Exciting Battle and Dramatic Finish': The West Virginia Woman Suffrage Movement," West Virginia History 46(1985–86): 137–58 and '"Exciting Battle and Dramatic Finish': West Virginia's Ratification of the Nineteenth Amendment," ibid. 48(1989): 61–92
- Karina G. Thurston, "Lenna Lowe Yost, temperance, and the ratification of the woman suffrage amendment by West Virginia" (2009). M.A. Thesis, West Virginia University. https://researchrepository.wvu.edu/etd/695
