= Conewago Township, Pennsylvania =

Conewago Township may refer to:

- Conewago Township, Adams County, Pennsylvania
- Conewago Township, Dauphin County, Pennsylvania
- Conewago Township, York County, Pennsylvania

== See also ==
- Conewango Township, Warren County, Pennsylvania
