= Eugen Albrecht =

German pathologist

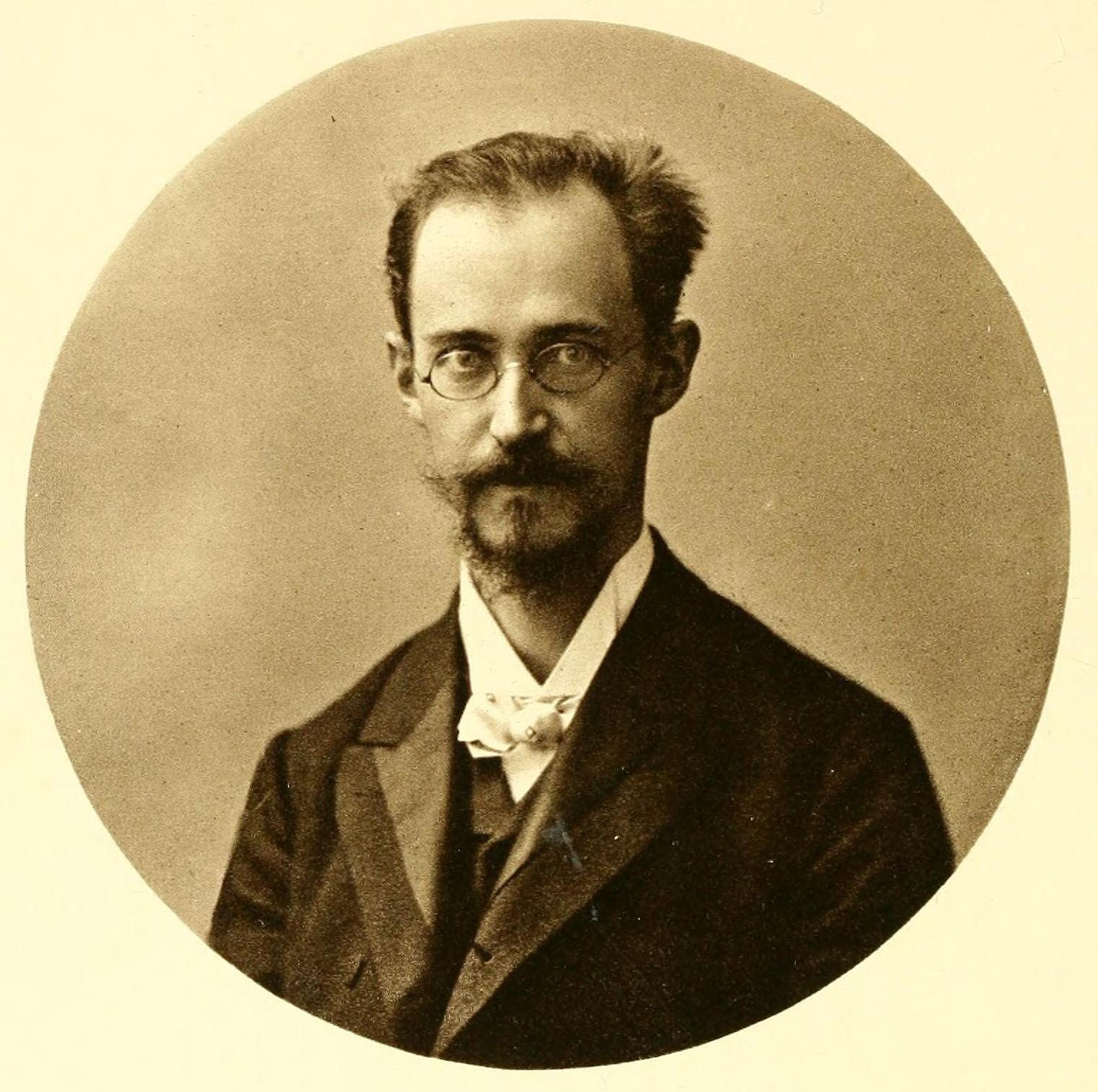
Eugen Albrecht (1872–1908)

Eugen Albrecht (21 June 1872 – 18 June 1908) was a German pathologist. His research largely dealt with the physical-chemical status of cells under normal and pathological conditions.

Albrecht was born in Sonthofen. In 1895, he obtained his doctorate from the Ludwig-Maximilians-Universität München, where he was a student of Karl Wilhelm von Kupffer. Afterwards, he was an assistant to Wilhelm Roux at the institute of anatomy at the University of Halle, followed by work at the Stazione Zoologica Anton Dohrn in Naples (1897–1898). In 1899, he became an assistant to Otto Bollinger at the institute of pathology at the Ludwig-Maximilians-Universität München. From 1900 to 1904, he served as prosector at the Städtisches Krankenhaus rechts der Isar. In 1904, he succeeded Karl Weigert as director of the Senckenberg Institute of Pathological Anatomy at Goethe University Frankfurt. He died in Frankfurt four years later of a pulmonary hemorrhage caused by tuberculosis.

He is remembered for development of the concept of "hamartoma and choristoma" in an attempt to describe the relationship between abnormal formation and tumor. In 1907, he founded the journal Frankfurter Zeitschrift für Pathologie.

== Published works ==
- Vorfragen der Biologie, 1899 – Preliminary issues of biology.
- Struktur der Leberzelle, 1899 – Structure of the liver cell.
- Zur Frage der Coagulations nekrose (with Hans Schmaus), 1899 – On coagulative necrosis.
- Gegen die Teleologie, 1899 – About teleology.
- Pathologie der Zelle, 1902 – Pathology of the cell.
- Über das Cavernom der Milz, 1902 – On cavernoma of the spleen.
- Experimentelle Untersuchungen über die Kernmembran, 1903 – Experimental investigations on the nuclear membrane.
- Beiträge zur pathologischen Anatomie (with Otto Bollinger), 1903 – Contribution to pathological anatomy.
