= Rudolf Jaffé =

German physician and pathologist

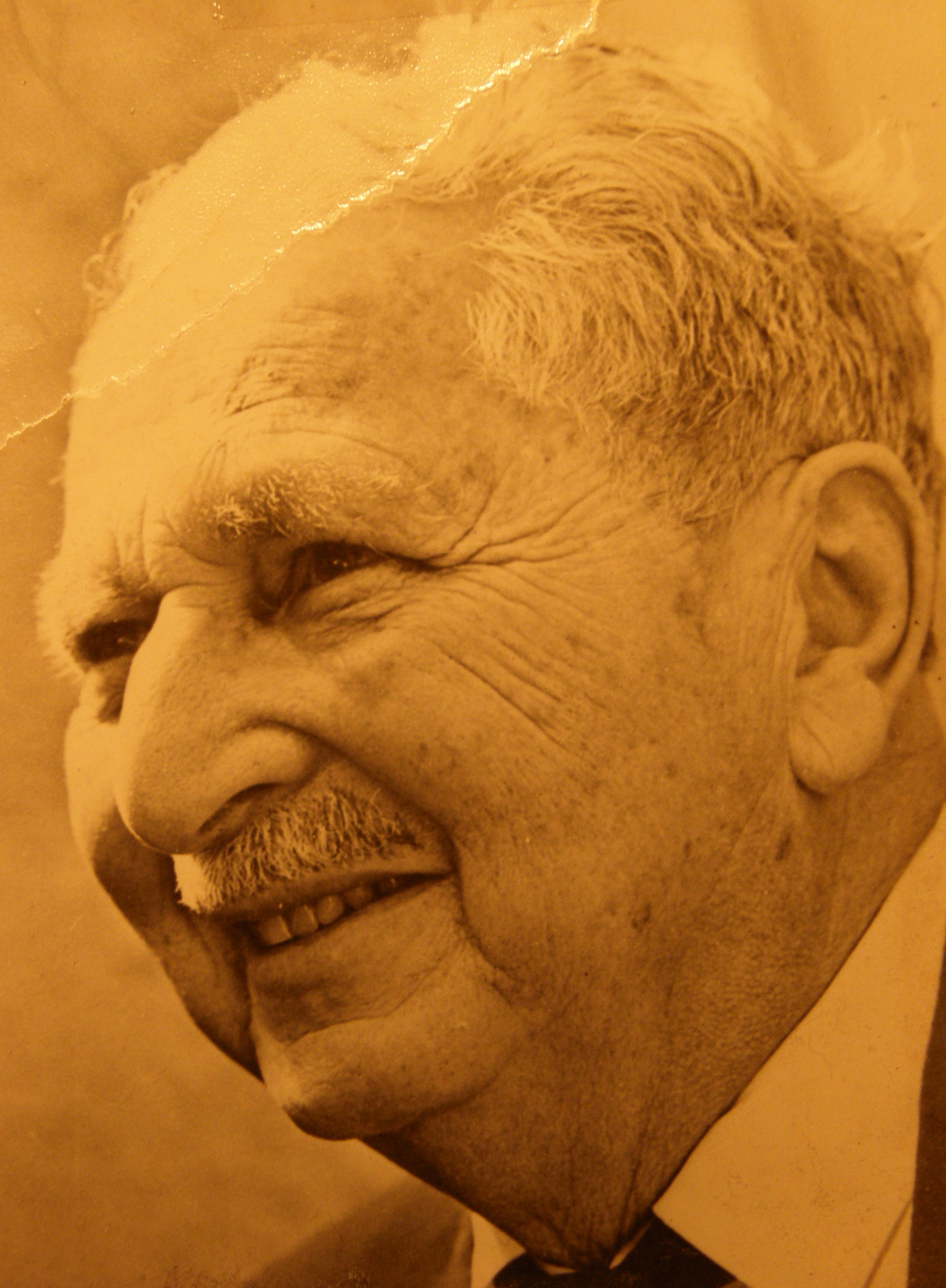
- Born: 14 October 1885; Berlin, Germany
- Died: 13 March 1975 (aged 89); Caracas
- Occupations: Physician and Professor
- Awards: Received the Commander's Cross of the Order of Merit of the Federal Republic of Germany

Rudolf Jaffé (14 October 1885 – 13 March 1975) was a German physician and pathologist.

== Career ==
Born in Berlin to a Jewish family, he was a son of the noted chemist and industrialist Benno Jaffé. He studied medicine in Berlin, Munich and Freiburg, and after graduating as a physician, he worked at the Institute for Maritime and Tropical Diseases in Hamburg (1909–1910) and as a ship's doctor in East Asia. He became an assistant professor in bacteriology in Giessen in 1911 and joined the Senckenberg Institute of Pathology in Frankfurt in 1912, as an assistant of Bernhard Fischer-Wasels. During the First World War, he served as a military physician in Galicia and Romania and then became an army pathologist in Vilnius. During his military service he received the Iron Cross second class. In 1919 he earned his Habilitation at the Goethe University Frankfurt and was appointed as an associate professor. He became director of the Pathological-Bacteriological Institute in Berlin-Moabit in 1926, a position he held until he was forced to retire by the Nazis in 1934.

In 1936 he emigrated to Venezuela, where he became the founding director of the Institute of Pathology at the Vargas Hospital in Caracas, which he based on the German model. After the Second World War, he resumed his contact with Germany and had extensive cooperation with German scientists, and was a regular contributor to the activities of the German Society for Pathology. He retired in 1953.

Prior to 1934, his research notably focused on lipids in the endocrine gland. In Venezuela he focused on infectious diseases such as schistosomiasis and syphilis. He died in Caracas.

He received the Commander's Cross of the Order of Merit of the Federal Republic of Germany in 1954. There is also a memorial plaque outside the Moabit Hospital in Berlin.

== Selected publications ==
- Leitfaden der pathologischen Anatomie für Zahnärzte und Studierende der Zahnheilkunde, Berlin 1923
- Pathologie der oberen Luft- und Speisewege, Leipzig 1929 (ed., with Felix Blumenfeld)
- Was lehrt uns die Bilharzia-Zirrhose in bezug auf die Probleme der Leber-Zirrhose? In: Schweizerische Medizinische Wochschrift, 23, 1942, pp. 1149–1154
- Die anatomischen Veränderungen bei Syphilis in Venezuela. In: Schweizerische Medizinische Wochschrift, 79, 1949, pp. 33–38

== Literature ==
- Georg Dhom: Geschichte der Histopathologie, Springer, 2001, ISBN 3-540-67490-X
- Jaffé, Rudolf in Reichshandbuch der deutschen Gesellschaft - Das Handbuch der Persönlichkeiten in Wort und Bild. Vol. 1, p. 837, Deutscher Wirtschaftsverlag, Berlin 1930
- Werner Röder; Herbert A. Strauss (ed.): International Biographical Dictionary of Central European Emigrés 1933-1945. Vol 2,1. München : Saur, 1983 ISBN 3-598-10089-2, p. 562
