= Karl Koester =

German pathologist

Professor Karl Koester
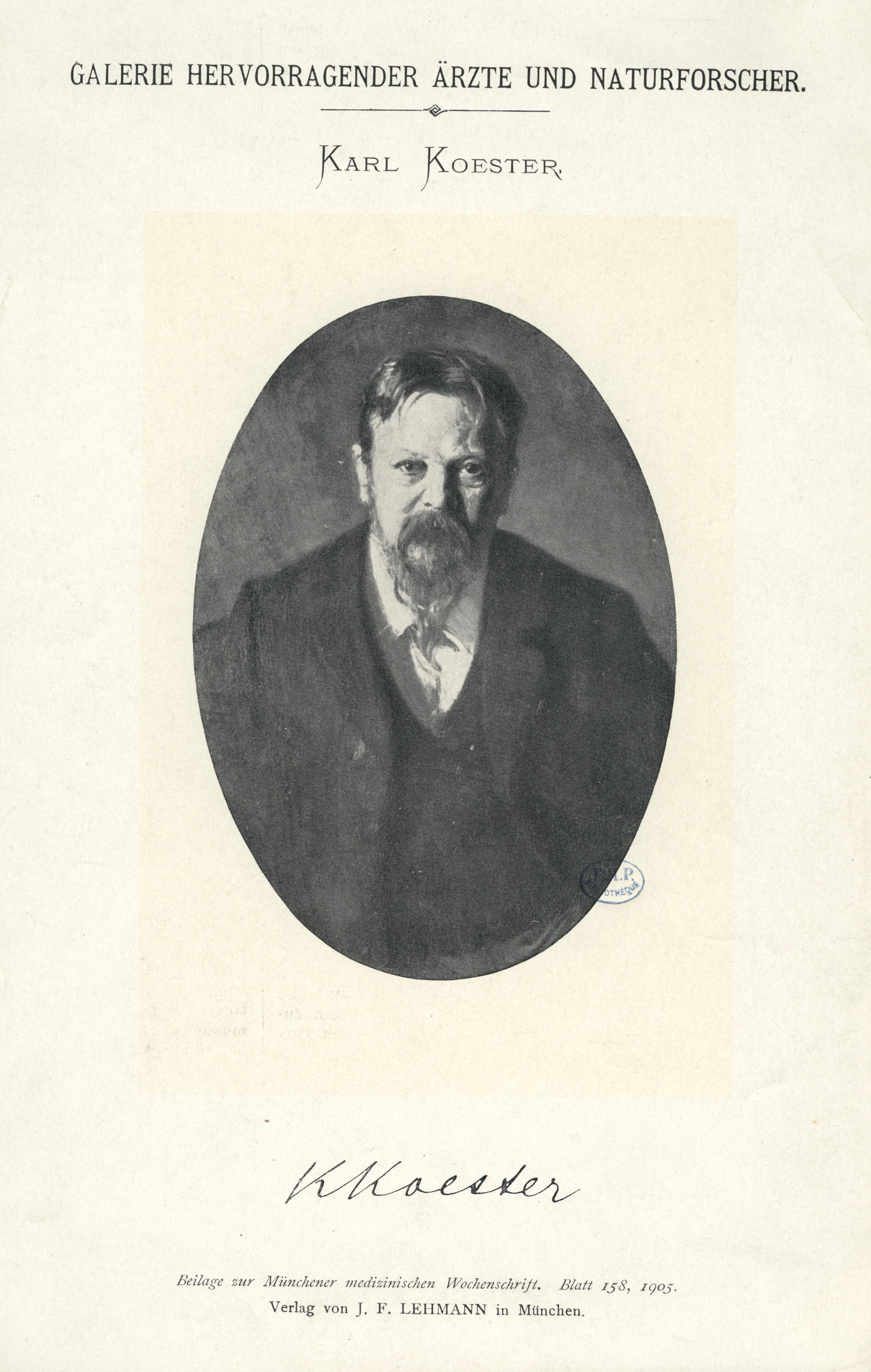
- Born: 2 April 1843; Bad Dürkheim
- Died: 2 December 1904 (aged 61); Bonn
- Scientific career
- Fields: Pathology
- Institutions: University of Bonn
- Doctoral advisor: Friedrich Daniel von Recklinghausen
- Notable students: Bernhard Fischer-Wasels

Karl Koester (born 2 April 1843 in Bad Dürkheim, died 2 December 1904 in Bonn) was a German pathologist and rector of the University of Bonn from 1898 to 1899. He was professor of pathology and director of the Institute of Pathology at the University of Bonn from 1874 to 1904. He held the title Geheimer Medizinalrat.

Koester studied medicine in Munich, Tübingen and Würzburg, and obtained his doctoral degree in Würzburg in 1867. His doctoral advisor and mentor was Friedrich Daniel von Recklinghausen, and he subsequently worked as Recklinghausen's assistant. From 1873 to 1874 he was professor of general medical pathology and anatomical pathology at the University of Giessen. He succeeded Eduard von Rindfleisch as professor of pathology at the University of Bonn in 1874.

In 1868 he published Ueber die feinere Structur der menschlichen Nabelschnur ("On the finer structure of the human umbilical cord").

He became a member of the German National Academy of Sciences Leopoldina in 1880.

== Selected works ==
- Cancroid mit hyaliner Degeneration (Cylindroma Billroth's), Berlin, 1867
- Ueber die feinere Structur der menschlichen Nabelschnur (diss.), Würzburg, 1868
- Die Entwicklung der Carcinome und Sarcome, Würzburg, 1869
- Die embolische Endcartitis, Berlin, 1878
- Ueber Freizügigkeit der Studierenden der Medizin an den Universitäten deutscher Zunge, Bonn, 1884
- Über Myokarditis, Bonn, 1888
