= Grand-disciple =

Mentor in fine arts

Grand-disciple or academic grandson (or granddaughter) (German: Enkelschüler) are terms sometimes used in academic contexts or contexts relating to fine arts, and denote someone whose mentor or teacher was himself (or herself) a student of a famous representative of that discipline, such as a famous composer or a Nobel Prize-winning scientist.

The term implies that knowledge, techniques and/or skills are transferred from the "grandfather" to the "grand-disciple," borrowing from kinship terminology. The term Enkelschüler is fairly common in German, but similar terms are also used in English to some extent. In German a doctoral advisor is also usually referred to as a Doktorvater, a "doctoral father," similarly modelled on kinship terminology.
