= Ernst Johann Schmitz =

German naturalist and clergyman

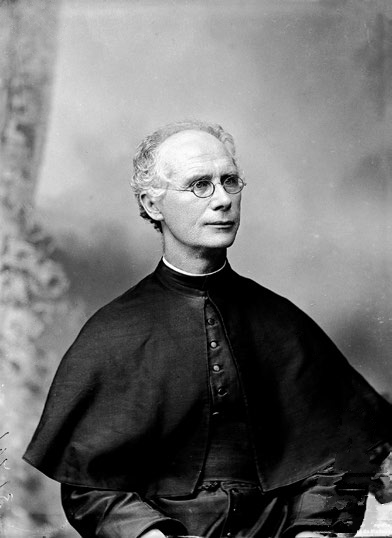
Ernst Schmitz, 1907

Ernst Johann Schmitz (18 May 1845 – 3 December 1922) was a German naturalist, ornithologist, entomologist and Roman Catholic priest.

Schmitz settled in Madeira in the late 1870s, serving as vice chancellor of the Funchal Seminary from 1891 to 1898, and again from 1902 to 1908, during which he became a naturalised Portuguese citizen. From 1898 to 1902 he worked in Belgium.

In 1908 he moved to Palestine to manage the Hospice of St Paul in Jerusalem. From 1914, he held similar positions in Tabgha, Damascus and finally Haifa, where he died.

Schmitz is known for his natural history studies on the island of Madeira, where he described the Madeiran wood pigeon, Zino's petrel and local ants. He also carried out extensive research in Palestine, where he assembled a unique zoological collection of Holy Land animals. This collection was presumed lost after Schmitz's death, but was discovered by chance in a cellar in Jerusalem's Old City in the 1970s.

The Schmitz Collection is now housed at the Steinhardt Museum of Natural History in Tel Aviv.
