= Herman Kalckar =

Danish biochemist (1908-1991)

Herman Moritz Kalckar
- Born: 26 March 1908; Copenhagen, Denmark
- Died: 17 May 1991 (aged 83)
- Education: University of Copenhagen
- Known for: Recognition of ATP as a universal energy carrier
- Awards: Honorary degrees from: Washington University in St. Louis; University of Chicago; University of Copenhagen
- Scientific career
- Fields: Biochemistry
- Workplaces: University of Copenhagen; California Institute of Technology (Caltech); Washington University in St. Louis; New York Public Health Institute; National Institutes of Health (NIH); Johns Hopkins University; Harvard Medical School; Massachusetts General Hospital
- Doctoral advisor: Ejnar Lundsgaard
- Other academic advisors: Fritz Lipmann
- Notable students: James D. Watson

Herman Moritz Kalckar (26 March 1908 – 17 May 1991) was a Danish biochemist who pioneered the study of cellular respiration. Kalckar made a number of significant contributions to the development of 20th century biochemistry including:

- a founder of bioenergetics;
- enzymology, including novel assay techniques;
- galactose metabolism in both microorganisms and animal tissues;
- suggestion that strontium-90 levels in children’s deciduous teeth correlated with nuclear testing.

== Childhood and early life ==
Kalckar described his family life as “a middle class, Danish family—Danish for several generations.” His family life was not financially wealthy but was intellectually rich. His father, Ludvig Kalckar, was a businessman with an avid interest in theatre, especially the work of Henrik Ibsen. His mother, Bertha (née Melchior) Rosalie introduced Kalckar to a variety of French and German writers, including Gustave Flaubert, Marcel Proust, Johann von Goethe, and Heinrich Heine. Kalckar observed that this time allowed his “interest in the humanistic disciplines” to develop and thrive.

In his autobiographical reflections, Kalckar spent little time on his early education and referred to high school biology experience as "somewhat static," except for "some extraordinary demonstrations in human physiology" by August Krogh. Krogh, a physiologist and Professor at the University of Copenhagen, won the 1920 Nobel prize for his description of capillary blood flow and regulation, introduced the principles of human physiology to Danish high school students. Krogh's demonstrations introduced the students to a number of modern physiology instruments and experimental techniques. The experience seems to have profoundly influenced Kalckar's choicer of research area.

== Graduate Work ==
Kalckar completed his medical training at the University of Copenhagen in 1933, and then began research for his Ph.D. in Ejnar Lundsgaard's (1899–1968) physiology laboratory; that work established the foundation of a fundamental biochemical paradigm, i.e. "oxidative phosphorylation". During this period, Lundsgaard was preoccupied as physiology department chair, consequently Fritz Albert Lipmann, who had recently fled Germany, served as Kalckar's research mentor. Later, Kalckar and Lipmann both independently developed concepts of a "high energy bond" (which Lipmann famously expressed as "~P") and ATP as a universal "energy carrier."

Kalckar was fortunate to be working at an important period in biochemistry's evolution. The biochemical community was in the process of demonstrating the chemical reactions involved in breakdown of foodstuffs essential for growth. At the same time, physiologists were demonstrating the involvement of some of these reactions various physiological processes, e.g. muscle contraction. Kalckar's breakthrough work was the demonstration that organic compounds, which were phosphorylated during metabolic processes, involved oxygen consumption; oxygen consumption was linked to organic compound phosphorylation. His key experiment demonstrated that in frog muscles where glycolysis had been inhibited with iodoacetate, muscular contraction continued for a short period using phosphocreatine as a source of energy. Kalckar referred to this process as “aerobic phosphorylation” (now called oxidative phosphorylation, a biochemical process fundamental to all living organisms). The work was the first demonstration that carbohydrate oxidation and carbohydrate phosphorylation were linked, i.e. the two pathways were directly “coupled.” Furthermore, the study helped establish the basic phenomenon of oxidative phosphorylation, opened the way for its systematic exploration, and suggested for the first time that phosphate compounds acted as a link between catabolism and anabolism.

== First American Work ==
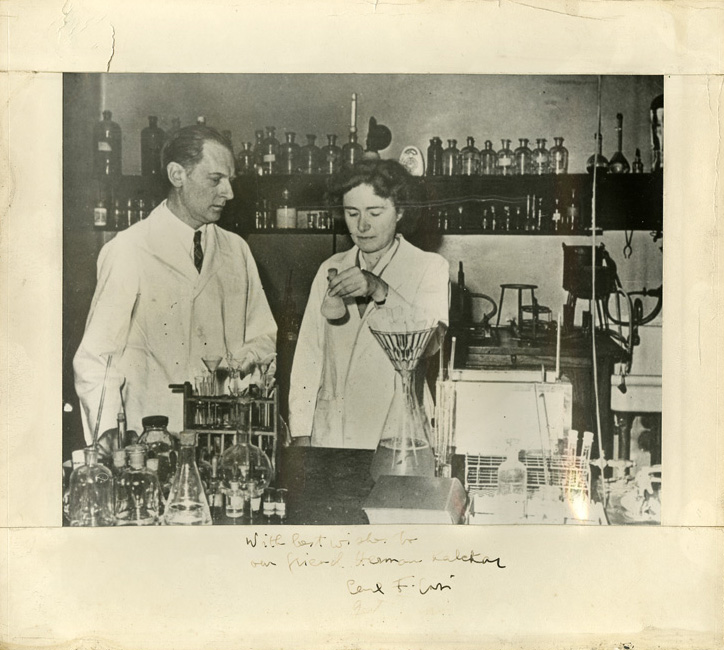
"With best wishes to our friend Herman Kalckar", Carl and Gerty Cori

Upon completing his graduate studies, Kalckar received a Rockefeller research fellowship to spend a year at the California Institute of Technology (Caltech). After arriving in the United States in early 1939, Kalckar briefly visited the Cori lab in St. Louis en route to the west coast. Carl and Gerty Cori had unsuccessfully attempted to reproduce Kalckar's oxidative phosphorylation work, and Kalckar was able to point out a key element missing in their experiment. During his St. Louis visit Kalckar and Sidney Colowick (1916–1985) became good friends.

Kalckar and his wife arrived in Pasadena in the spring of 1939 and rapidly became a part of the Caltech social and intellectual community, including Max Delbrück, Linus Pauling, and James and David Bonner. At Delbrück's suggestion he attended C. B. van Niel’s popular Pacific Grove microbiology course, an event that had a lifetime influence on his research career.

While at Caltech, Kalckar wrote and published what was, arguably, one of his most important papers. Under Pauling's influence he reviewed the literature dealing with biological energetic mechanisms. In 108 pages, including 310 references, the paper was a virtual synopsis of the state of biochemistry at the time. As Kalckar noted:

The aim of this review has been not only to collect and coordinate knowledge from very different fields, like animal physiology, microbiology, enzyme chemistry, organic and physical chemistry, but also to interpret all the fundamental biological phenomena from a dynamic point of view. (p. 167)

Although not highly cited, the paper was important because Kalckar provided strong evidence for the role of "high energy" compounds in metabolic processes. In the paper Kalckar developed an argument for the central role of adenosine 5'-triphosphate (ATP) as a common metabolic "energy carrier." The paper is not highly cited, most likely, because Kalckar's mentor and friend, Fritz Lipmann, published a similar review in which he introduced the notion of "~P" as a means of representing a "high energy" bond.

The onset of World War II stranded the Kalckars in the United States; Kalckar was offered an appointment as a research fellow at Washington University, and he and his wife moved to St. Louis. Kalckar resumed his friendship with Colowick, and they collaborated to work on the enzyme adenylate kinase in 1942, which they purified from muscle extracts. Further work on nucleotide metabolism allowed him to identify nucleoside phosphorylase, a key enzyme in nucleotide salvage pathways. The work was very important in expanding Kalckar's research interests because previously he had worked with complex physiological systems. In his Washington University work, he focused on individual enzymes and their purification.

At an invitation from Oliver Lowry (1910–1996), Kalckar moved to the New York Public Health Institute as a research associate. The move was an important part of developing Kalckar's research biochemical abilities as an enzymologist, because as Paul Berg commented, he “developed a whole new approach to being able to use enzymes in a novel way.” The lab was equipped with a Beckman DU ultraviolet spectrophotometer, introduced in 1941 and still relatively rare; Kalckar rapidly used the instrument to develop several novel enzyme assays. In 1947 he published three papers on purine metabolism enzymes, all of which were highly cited (3,200 citations in 2006).

Famous Post-Graduate Student: James D. Watson
