= Conewango Township, Warren County, Pennsylvania =

Township in Pennsylvania, United States

Coordinates: 41°52′00″N 79°15′14″W

Conewango Township
- Township
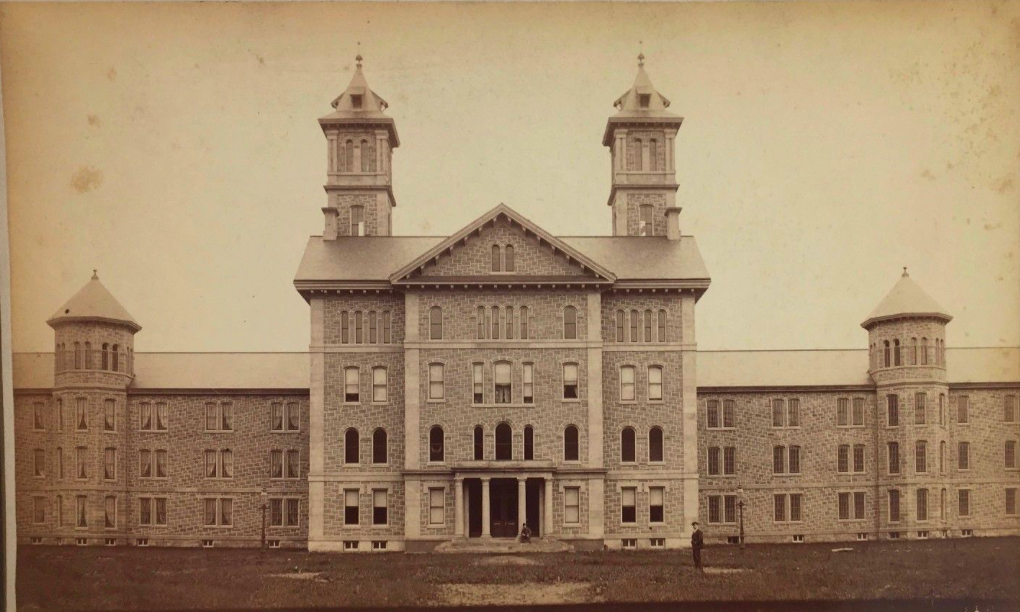
- Warren State Hospital in the township

- Logo

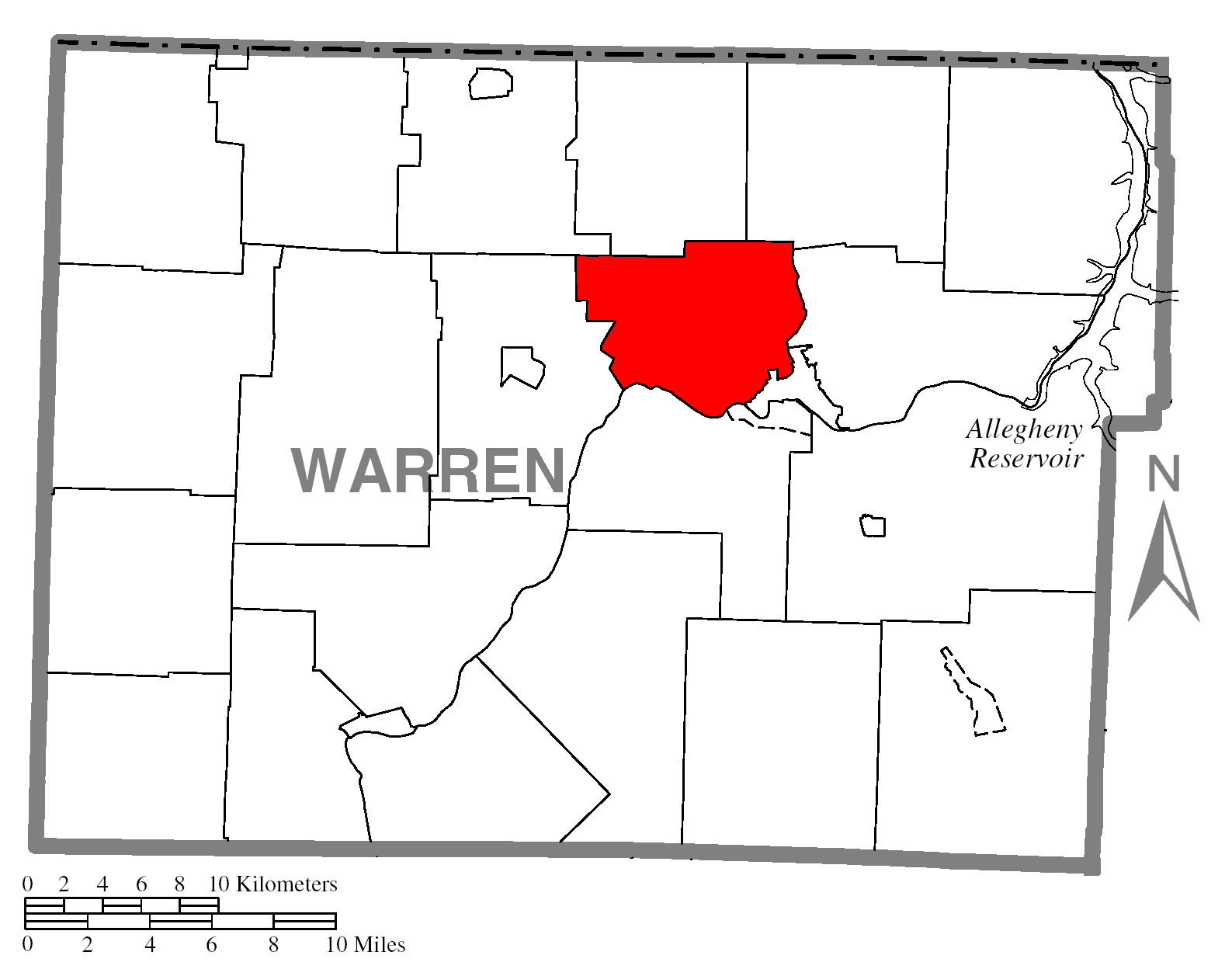
- Location of Conewango Township in Warren County

- Location of Warren County in Pennsylvania
- Country: United States
- State: Pennsylvania
- County: Warren

Area
  - Total: 30.41 sq mi (78.77 km^{2})
  - Land: 29.96 sq mi (77.60 km^{2})
  - Water: 0.45 sq mi (1.17 km^{2})

Population (2020)
  - Total: 3,427
  - Estimate (2024): 3,325
  - Density: 114.1/sq mi (44.06/km^{2})
- Time zone: UTC-4 (EST)
  - Summer (DST): UTC-5 (EDT)
- Area code: 814
- FIPS code: 42-123-15672
- Website: www.conewangotwp.com

Conewango Township is a township in Warren County, Pennsylvania, United States. The population was 3,427 at the 2020 census, down from 3,594 at the 2010 census. 3,915 at the 2000 census.

== Geography ==
According to the United States Census Bureau, the township has a total area of 30.4 square miles (79 km^{2}), of which 30.0 square miles (78 km^{2}) is land and 0.5 square miles (1.3 km^{2}) (1.51%) is water. It contains the census-designated places of North Warren and Starbrick.

== Demographics ==
Historical population
Census	Pop.	Note	%±
2000	3,915		—
2010	3,594		−8.2%
2020	3,427		−4.6%
2024 (est.)	3,325		−3.0%
U.S. Decennial Census

As of the census of 2000, there were 3,915 people, 1,526 households, and 1,069 families residing in the township. The population density was 130.6 inhabitants per square mile (50.4/km^{2}). There were 1,659 housing units at an average density of 55.4 per square mile (21.4/km^{2}). The racial makeup of the township was 97.73% White, 0.61% African American, 0.26% Native American, 0.41% Asian, 0.05% Pacific Islander, 0.38% from other races, and 0.56% from two or more races. Hispanic or Latino of any race were 0.59% of the population.

There were 1,526 households, out of which 28.4% had children under the age of 18 living with them, 57.1% were married couples living together, 9.2% had a female householder with no husband present, and 29.9% were non-families. 25.9% of all households were made up of individuals, and 10.8% had someone living alone who was 65 years of age or older. The average household size was 2.37 and the average family size was 2.83.

In the township the population was spread out, with 21.4% under the age of 18, 6.4% from 18 to 24, 28.5% from 25 to 44, 26.7% from 45 to 64, and 16.9% who were 65 years of age or older. The median age was 42 years. For every 100 females, there were 99.1 males. For every 100 females age 18 and over, there were 96.3 males.

The median income for a household in the township was $42,690, and the median income for a family was $48,818. Males had a median income of $36,230 versus $21,463 for females. The per capita income for the township was $18,823. About 4.6% of families and 6.9% of the population were below the poverty line, including 14.0% of those under age 18 and 4.5% of those age 65 or over.
