= Joe Root (hermit) =

American hermit

- Root while residing at Presque Isle State Park (circa 1890s)
- Born: 1860; Erie, Pennsylvania, United States
- Died: 1912 (aged 51–52); Warren, Pennsylvania, United States
- Resting place: Odd Fellow Cemetery (Philadelphia, Pennsylvania)
- Known for: Well-known hermit who lived in Presque Isle State Park; lived completely off the land

Joseph Root (1860 – 29 October 1912) was a well-known hermit who lived in what is now Presque Isle State Park in Pennsylvania. Born in Erie, Pennsylvania, Root lived on Presque Isle without any modern conveniences. He has sometimes been nicknamed "the King of the Peninsula" or "the King of Presque Isle".

== Life ==
=== Presque Isle State Park ===
Root moved away from his childhood home to Presque Isle while still in his adolescent years. He was one of the first permanent inhabitants of the peninsula (Presque Isle wasn't declared an official state park until 1921). There was also a lighthouse keeper who resided at the park during the late 19th century and he often had his tomatoes swiped by Root.

Root hunted and fished to support himself in the harsh environment – he would become fond of raw fish in particular. There was a rumor that a dead cow once washed up on the shore of Presque Isle and Root fed off of it for an entire week. Root also ate local wild plants such as wild cattails, duck potatoes, spatterdocks, rice, blueberries, dewberries, and wild strawberries.

Root was a favorite with local children, entertaining them with ventriloquism and stories about his "friends". These friends were called the Jee-Bees (alternatively known as either GBs or jeebies); they were invisible nature spirits who could accurately predict the weather. During long winter nights, Root would walk to Erie to spend some time at the local poorhouse. Locals could sometimes see him walking on State Street with either a fishing net or a cane pole.

=== Later life ===
Root was committed to the Warren State Hospital for the Insane in Warren, Pennsylvania, on 14 April 1910 after a short stay at an Erie-area poorhouse.

== Legacy ==
Joe Root is remembered in the Erie, Pennsylvania, area as a colorful character and something of a symbol of Erie's history. A now-shuttered local restaurant, Joe Root's Grill, whose last day open for business was 30 September 2019, honored his name, as does a winter golf tournament, Joe Root's Frostbite Open (sponsored by local businesses, one of which was the restaurant).
