= North Warren, Pennsylvania =

Unincorporated community in Pennsylvania, US

Coordinates: 41°52′27″N 79°09′08″W

- Census-designated place
- Interactive map of North Warren, Pennsylvania
- Country: United States
- State: Pennsylvania
- County: Warren

Area
  - Total: 8.19 sq mi (21.22 km^{2})
  - Land: 8.19 sq mi (21.21 km^{2})
  - Water: 0.0039 sq mi (0.01 km^{2})

Population (2020)
  - Total: 1,855
  - Density: 226.5/sq mi (87.44/km^{2})
- Time zone: UTC-5 (Eastern (EST))
  - Summer (DST): UTC-4 (EDT)
- ZIP code: 16365
- Area code: 814
- FIPS code: 42-55520

North Warren is a census-designated place located along the Conewango Creek in Conewango Township, Warren County in the state of Pennsylvania, United States. The community is located to the north of the city of Warren. As of the 2010 census the population was 1,934 residents. A notable institution located in North Warren is the Warren State Hospital.

== Demographics ==
Historical population
Census	Pop.	Note	%±
2020	1,855		—
U.S. Decennial Census

== Education ==
It is in the Warren County School District.
