= Senckenberg Institute of Pathology =

German research institute

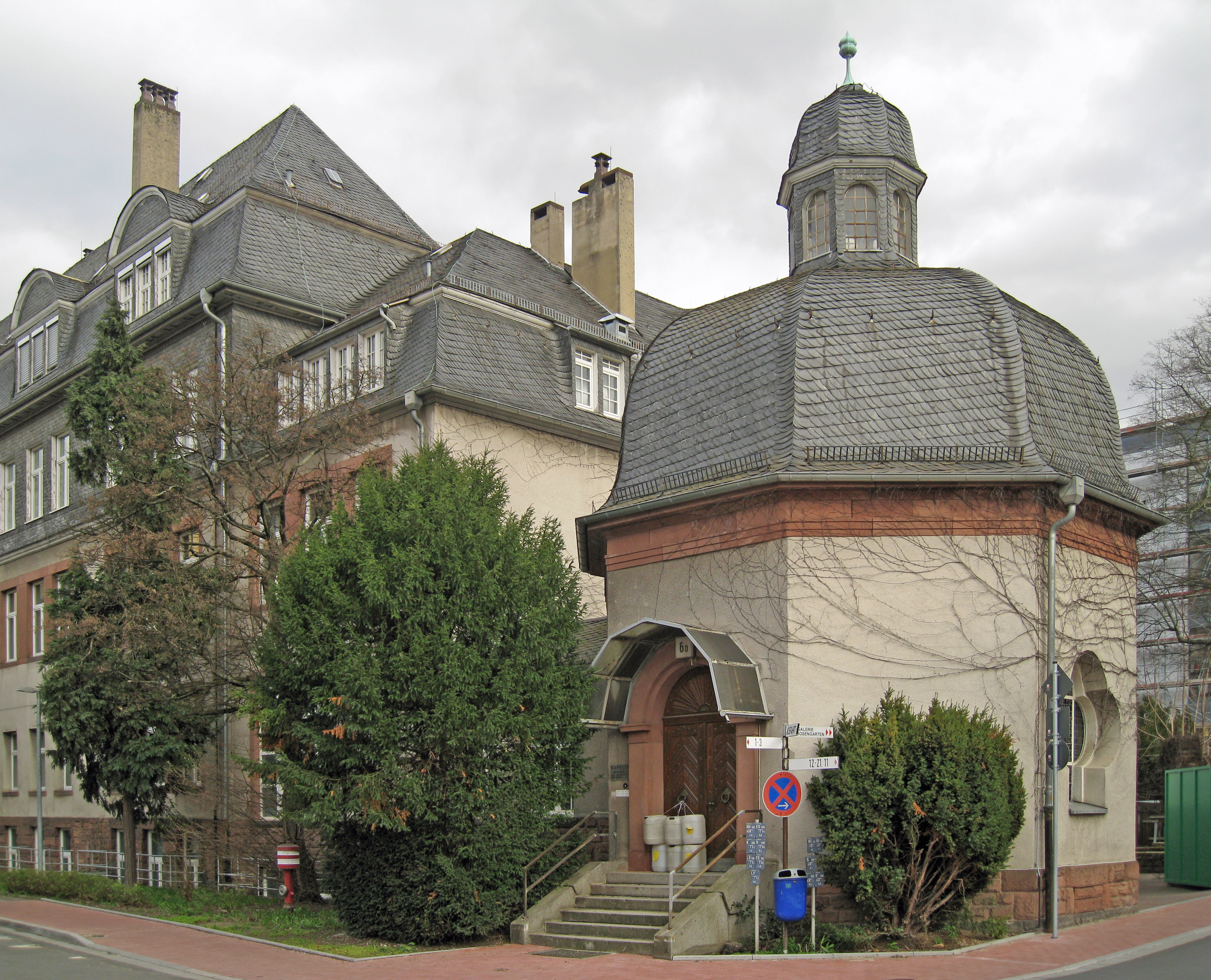
The Senckenberg Institute of Pathology, with hospital chapel to the right

The Senckenberg Institute of Pathology (German: Dr. Senckenbergisches Institut für Pathologie or Senckenbergisches Pathologisches Institut), formerly known as the Institute of Anatomical Pathology of the Senckenberg Foundation, is a pathological institute of the Goethe University Frankfurt.

It was founded in 1763 by Johann Christian Senckenberg as the Theatrum Anatomicum, as part of the Senckenberg Foundation. In 1914, the institute became part of the Goethe University Frankfurt.

== Directors ==
- Karl Weigert 1885–1904
- Eugen Albrecht 1904–1908
- Bernhard Fischer-Wasels 1908–1941
- Arnold Lauche 1943–1959
- Wolfgang Rotter 1960–1978
- Martin-Leo Hansmann
