= Brokenstraw Creek =

- Location of the mouth of the Brokenstraw Creek in Pennsylvania

Location
- Country: United States
- State: New York, Pennsylvania
- Counties: Chautauqua, Warren

Physical characteristics
- Source
  - location: Clymer, Chautauqua County, New York
  - coordinates: 42°2′35″N 79°30′9″W
  - elevation: 1,848 ft (563 m)
- Mouth: Allegheny River
  - location: Irvine, Warren County, Pennsylvania
  - coordinates: 41°50′8″N 79°15′34″W
  - elevation: 1,145 ft (349 m)
- Length: 37.1 mi (59.7 km)
- Basin size: 338 sq mi (880 km^{2})
- Discharge
  - location: Allegheny River
  - average: 645.77 cu ft/s (18.286 m^{3}/s) at mouth with Allegheny River

Basin features
- Progression: generally southerly with bends
- River system: Allegheny River
- Tributaries
  - left: Tamarack Swamp; Coffee Creek; Damon Run; Blue Eye Run; Little Brokenstraw Creek; Mead Run; Matthews Run; Indian Camp Run; McKinney Run; Irvine Run
  - right: Brownell Branch; Lathrup Gulf; Hare Creek; Spring Creek; Gar Run; Andrews Run
- Bridges: Town Line Road, Nazareth Road, Allen Road, Knowlton Road, Mill Road, PA 957, Baker Hill Road, PA 426, Locey Road, Punkey Hollow Road, PA 27, Davey Hill Road, Airport Road, Couver's Crossing Road, US 6, North Main Street, US 6, National Forge Road

Brokenstraw Creek is a 37.1-mile (59.7 km) tributary of the Allegheny River in Warren County, Pennsylvania in the United States.

Brokenstraw Creek is made up of two smaller streams: The "Little Brokenstraw" originates south east of Panama, New York and flows south through Lottsville and Wrightsville to Pittsfield, PA. The Brokenstraw Creek which originates near Columbus, Pennsylvania flows easterly to join the Little Brokenstraw in Pittsfield, Pennsylvania. The resulting stream is locally known as the Big Brokenstraw. From Pittsfield, the stream flows east through downtown Youngsville, Pennsylvania to Irvine when it meets the Allegheny River at the (old Seneca Indian village turned archaeological dig site) Buckaloons campground. The Brokenstraw Creek-Allegheny River confluence at Buckaloons is approximately 8 miles downstream of the city of Warren and 14 miles upstream of Tidioute, Pennsylvania.

Both the big and little Brokenstraw Creeks and their tributaries boast good water quality, low levels of pollution and high dissolved oxygen content, making these streams highly sought after for fishermen, especially trout fishermen. Brook trout are native and are commonly caught in the smaller tributaries, while the larger portions of the stream are stocked with Brown trout, Rainbow trout and Palomino (West Virginia Golden trout-Rainbow trout hybrid) trout by the Pennsylvania Fish and Boat Commission. Many stretches of stream also hold Smallmouth bass and White suckers. Occasionally Walleye and Northern pike are also caught in the creek.

== Tributaries ==
- Coffee Creek

== See also ==
- List of rivers of New York
- List of rivers of Pennsylvania
