= Sheffield Township, Pennsylvania =

Township in Pennsylvania, United States

Coordinates: 41°37′29″N 78°58′59″W

Sheffield Township
- Township
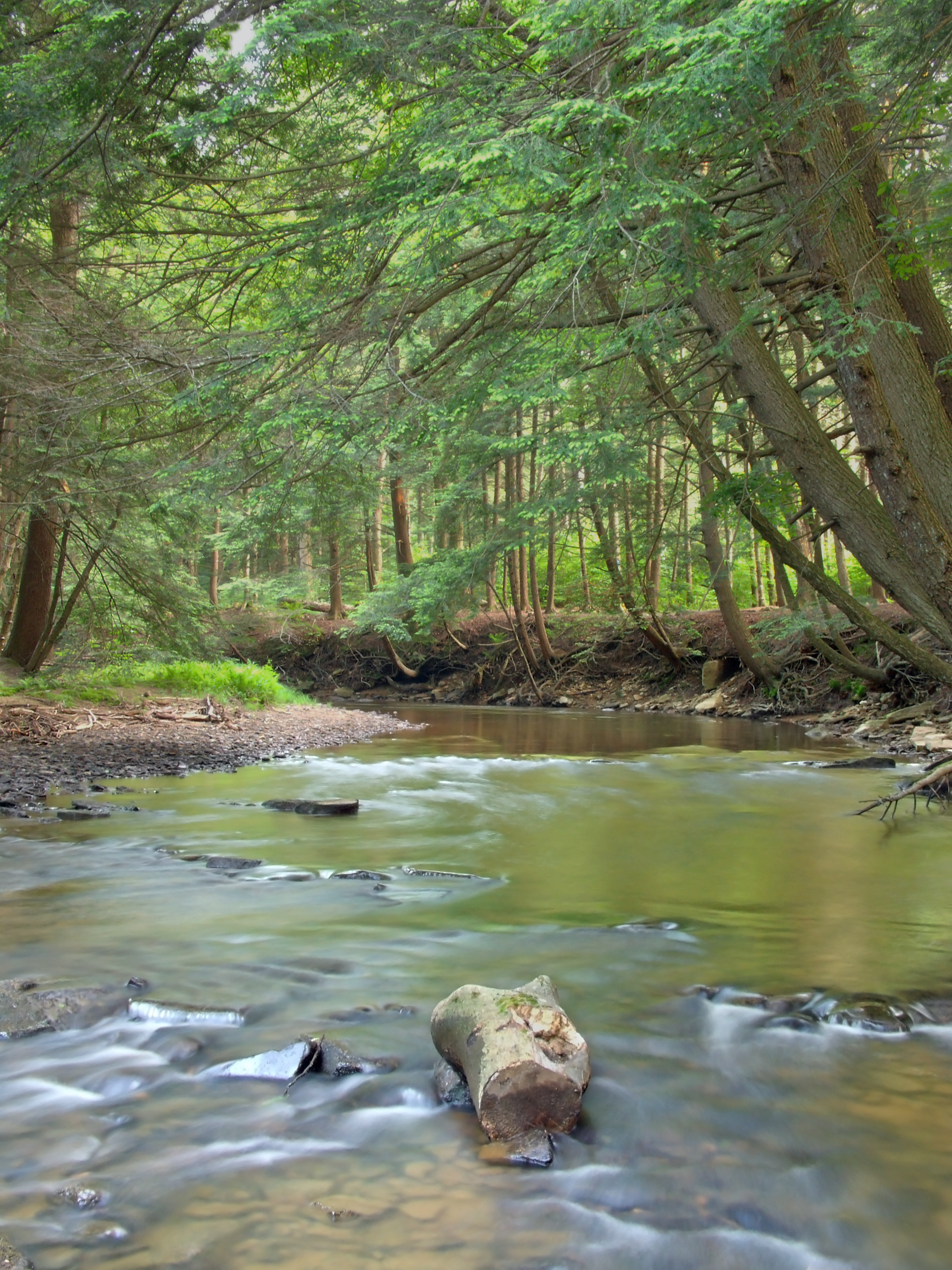
- South Branch Tionesta Creek within the Allegheny National Forest in the township, June 2011

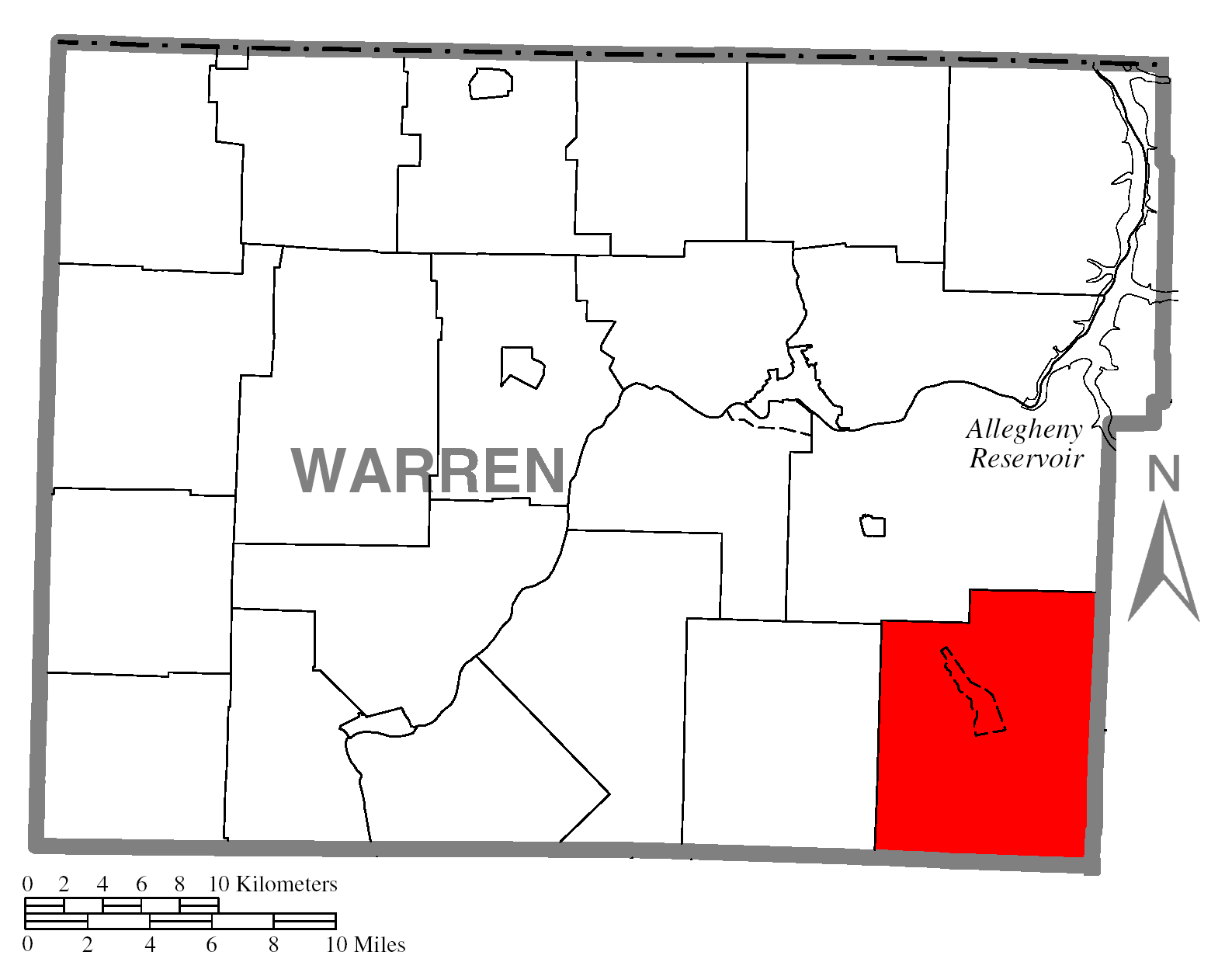
- Location of Sheffield Township in Warren County

- Location of Warren County in Pennsylvania
- Country: United States
- State: Pennsylvania
- County: Warren County

Area
  - Total: 59.17 sq mi (153.25 km^{2})
  - Land: 59.17 sq mi (153.24 km^{2})
  - Water: 0.0039 sq mi (0.01 km^{2})

Population (2020)
  - Total: 1,849
  - Estimate (2023): 1,791
  - Density: 34.2/sq mi (13.21/km^{2})
- Time zone: UTC-4 (EST)
  - Summer (DST): UTC-5 (EDT)
- Area code: 814
- FIPS code: 42-123-69992
- Website: https://www.sheffieldtownship.org/

Sheffield Township is a township in Warren County, Pennsylvania, United States. The population was 1,849 at the 2020 census, down from 2,121 at the 2010 census and 2,346 at the 2000 census.

== Geography ==
According to the United States Census Bureau, the township has a total area of 58.7 square miles (152.1 km^{2}), of which 58.7 square miles (152.1 km^{2}) is land and 0.02% is water. It contains the census-designated place of Sheffield.

== Demographics ==
Historical population
Census	Pop.	Note	%±
2000	2,346		—
2010	2,121		−9.6%
2020	1,849		−12.8%
2023 (est.)	1,791		−3.1%
U.S. Decennial Census

As of the census of 2000, there were 2,346 people, 955 households, and 656 families residing in the township. The population density was 39.9 inhabitants per square mile (15.4/km^{2}). There were 1,277 housing units at an average density of 21.7/sq mi (8.4/km^{2}). The racial makeup of the township was 98.72% White, 0.26% African American, 0.17% Native American, 0.04% Asian, 0.13% Pacific Islander, 0.17% from other races, and 0.51% from two or more races. Hispanic or Latino of any race were 0.72% of the population.

There were 955 households, out of which 29.6% had children under the age of 18 living with them, 55.2% were married couples living together, 9.8% had a female householder with no husband present, and 31.3% were non-families. 27.0% of all households were made up of individuals, and 13.7% had someone living alone who was 65 years of age or older. The average household size was 2.44 and the average family size was 2.94.

In the township the population was spread out, with 24.2% under the age of 18, 6.7% from 18 to 24, 26.7% from 25 to 44, 25.4% from 45 to 64, and 17.1% who were 65 years of age or older. The median age was 40 years. For every 100 females, there were 96.6 males. For every 100 females age 18 and over, there were 92.7 males.

The median income for a household in the township was $35,400, and the median income for a family was $42,500. Males had a median income of $33,295 versus $19,536 for females. The per capita income for the township was $16,423. About 7.2% of families and 11.3% of the population were below the poverty line, including 17.2% of those under age 18 and 4.1% of those age 65 or over.

== Education ==
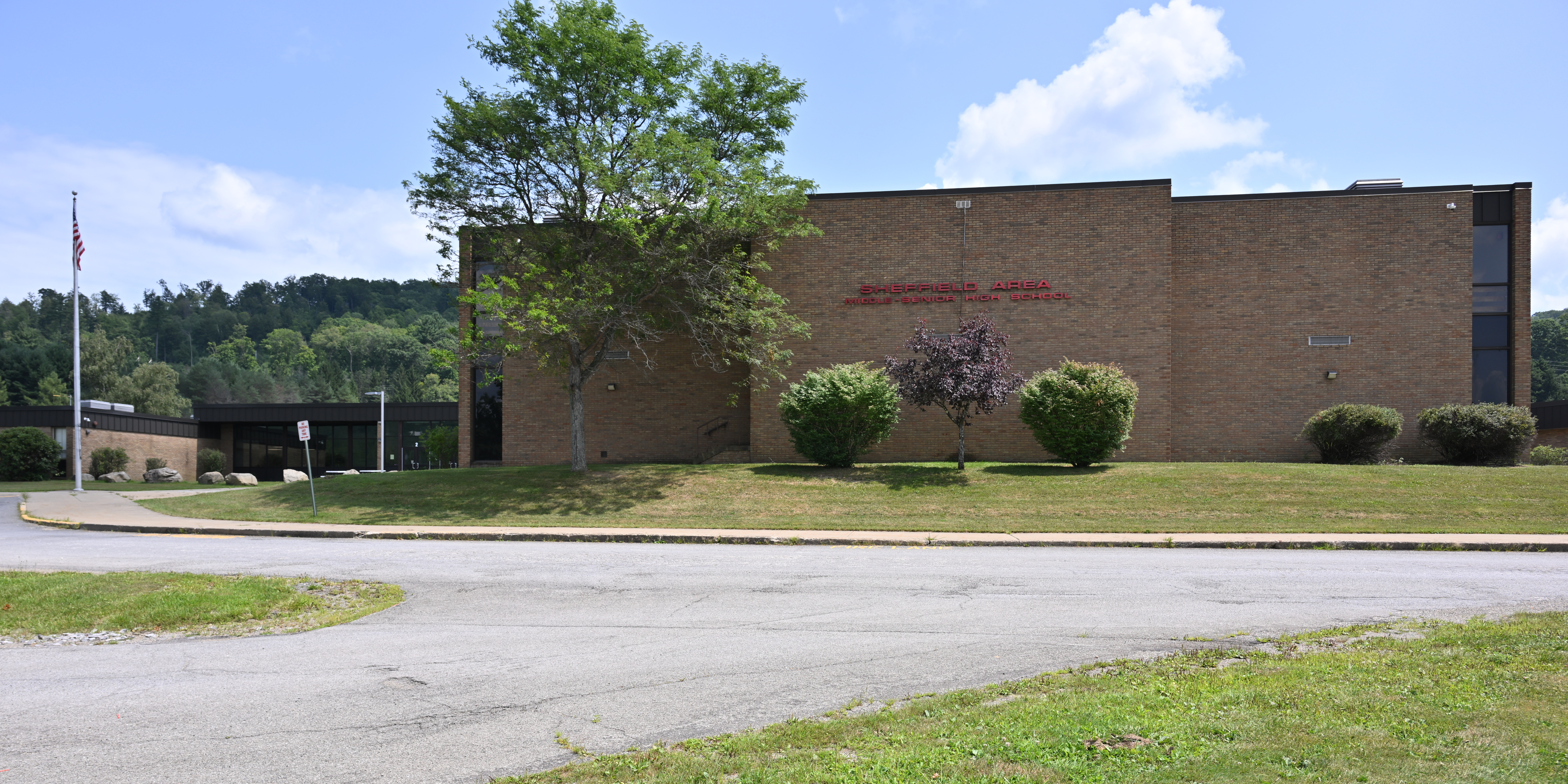
Sheffield Area Middle-High School, now used as Sheffield Area Elementary-Middle School

It is in the Warren County School District.

The district operates Sheffield Area Elementary Middle School, while high school students attend Warren Area High School.

It formerly operated Sheffield Area Middle-High School. The enrollment was about 600 in 1980, and by spring 2024 it was down to 224. In the 2024-2025 school year, due to a lack of employees, the school district began requiring Sheffield area high school students to take core classes at Warren Area High School, while they would take electives at the Sheffield campus. In 2025 the school board voted to end the Sheffield Area High School program altogether, with the building turned into a combined elementary and middle school facility.

== See also ==
- List of townships in Pennsylvania
