= Sheffield, Pennsylvania =

Unincorporated community in Pennsylvania, US

Sheffield
- Census-designated place
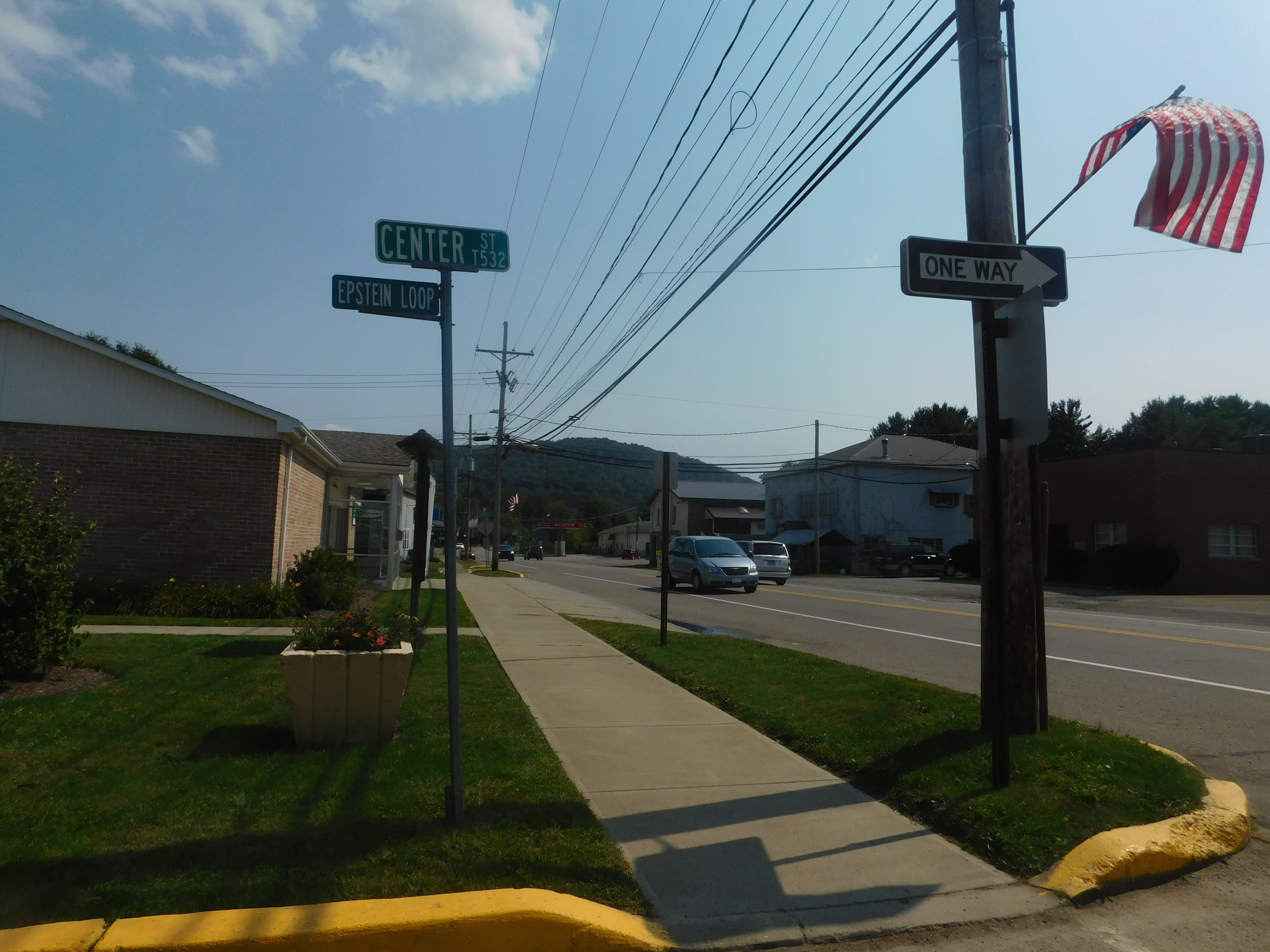
- Route 666 through downtown Sheffield, September 2017

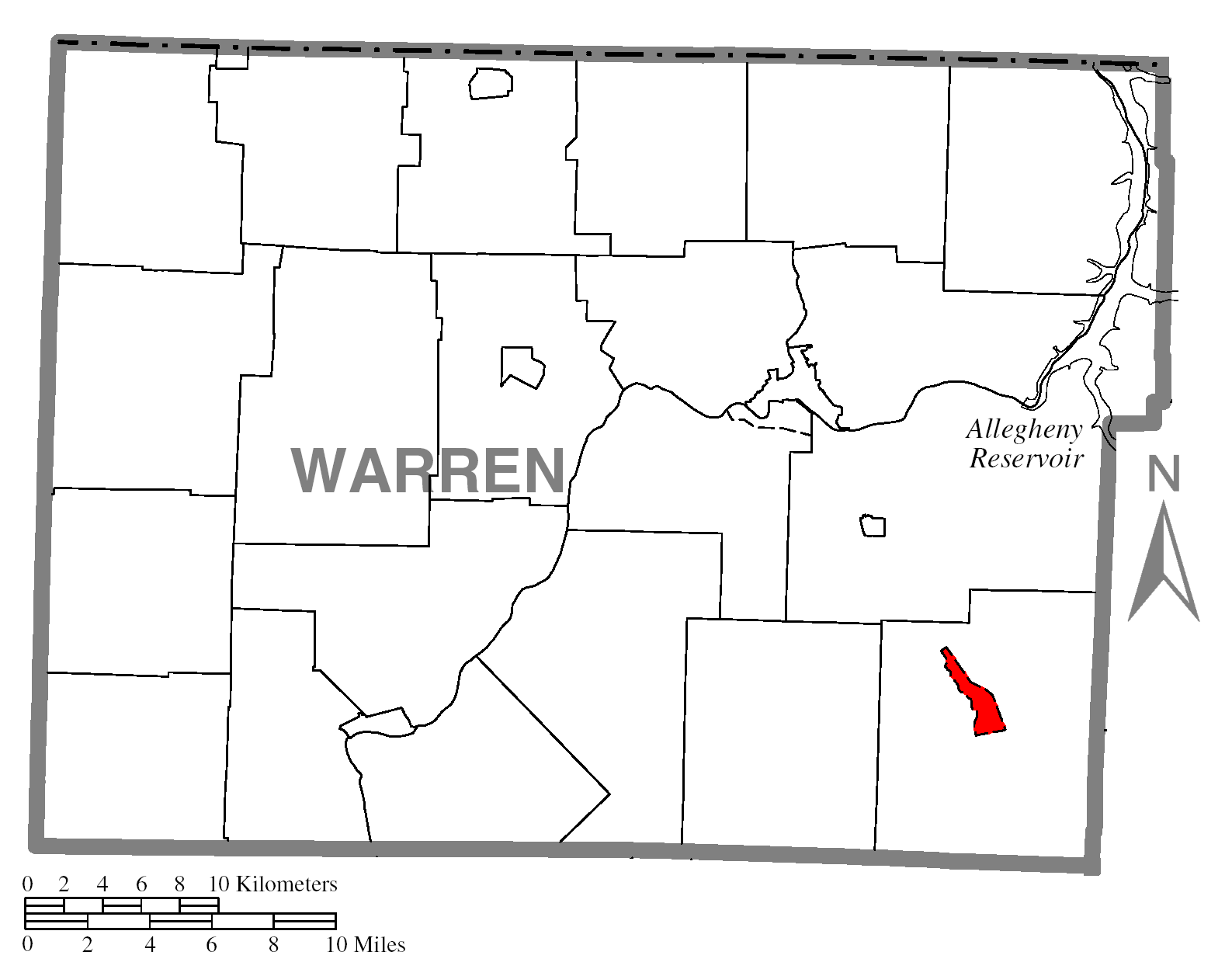
- Location of Sheffield in Warren County
- Coordinates: 41°42′15″N 79°2′2″W
- Country: United States
- State: Pennsylvania
- County: Warren

Area
  - Total: 1.6 sq mi (4.1 km^{2})

Population (2010)
  - Total: 1,123
  - Density: 700/sq mi (270/km^{2})
- Time zone: UTC-4 (EST)
  - Summer (DST): UTC-5 (EDT)
- ZIP code: 16347
- Area code: 814

Sheffield is a census-designated place (CDP) within Sheffield Township in southeastern Warren County, Pennsylvania, United States. It is named after Sheffield, England. The population was 1,123 as of the 2010 census.

== History ==
In decades leading to 2024, Sheffield and its environs became in the midst of a population decline. According to Tim Craig of the Washington Post, the effects on the infrastructure intensified circa 2014.

== Geography ==
Sheffield is located at 41°42′15″N 79°2′2″W (41.704246, -79.034022).

According to the United States Census Bureau, the CDP has a total area of 1.7 square miles (4.4 km^{2}), all land.

== Demographics ==
As of the 2010 census, there were 1,123 people, 510 households, and 344 families residing in the CDP. The population density was 701.9 people per square mile (271.0 people/km^{2}). There were 566 housing units at an average density of 327.4 per square mile (126.4/km^{2}). The racial makeup of the CDP was 98.66% White, 0.39% African American, 0.08% Native American, 0.08% Asian, 0.32% from other races, and 0.47% from two or more races. Hispanic or Latino of any race were 0.63% of the population.

There were 510 households, out of which 30.4% had children under the age of 18 living with them, 52.5% were married couples living together, 11.8% had a female householder with no husband present, and 32.4% were non-families. 27.3% of all households were made up of individuals, and 14.1% had someone living alone who was 65 years of age or older. The average household size was 2.45 and the average family size was 2.96.

In the CDP, the population was spread out, with 24.6% under the age of 18, 6.9% from 18 to 24, 26.0% from 25 to 44, 24.8% from 45 to 64, and 17.6% who were 65 years of age or older. The median age was 40 years. For every 100 females, there were 92.7 males. For every 100 females age 18 and over, there were 87.5 males.

The median income for a household in the CDP was $36,307, and the median income for a family was $46,912. Males had a median income of $29,886 versus $18,750 for females. The per capita income for the CDP was $16,751. About 7.8% of families and 11.4% of the population were below the poverty line, including 18.1% of those under age 18 and 7.2% of those age 65 or over.

== Government and infrastructure ==
The Sheffield Volunteer Fire Department provides fire protection services.

Starting in 2022, the community used private ambulances, as the volunteer fire department at that time ended its ambulance services.

== Culture ==
The Sheffield Depot Heritage Museum is in Sheffield.

The Johnny Appleseed Festival was held in the community. In 2024, the organization that enacted the festival stated that there were not enough people to work to establish the festival.

== Education ==
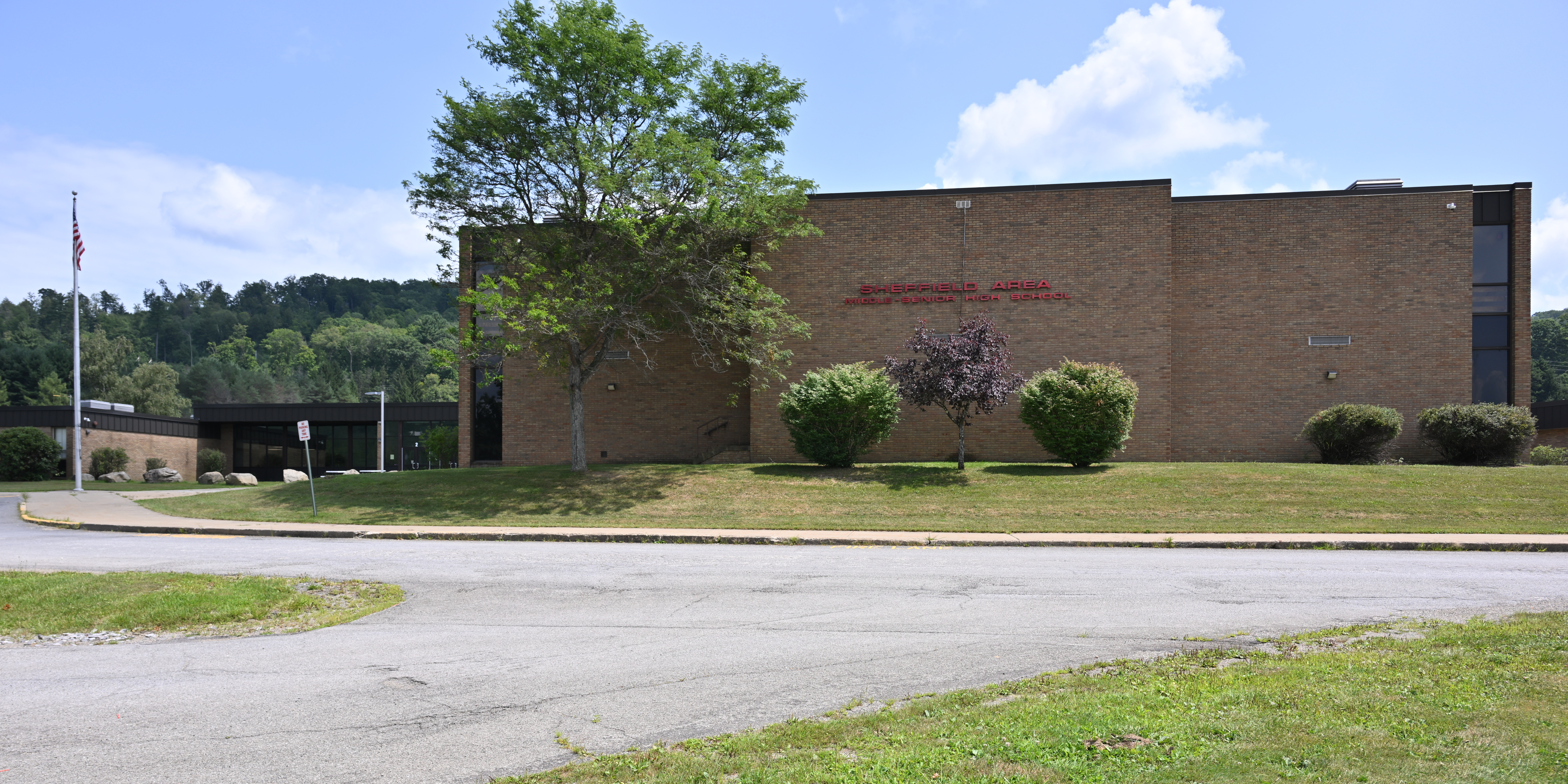
Sheffield Area Middle-High School, now used as Sheffield Area Elementary-Middle School

It is in the Warren County School District. The district operates Sheffield Area Elementary Middle School, while high school students attend Warren Area High School.

It formerly operated Sheffield Area Middle-High School. The enrollment was about 600 in 1980, and by spring 2024 it was down to 224. In the 2024–2025 school year, due to a lack of employees, the school district began requiring Sheffield area high school students to take core classes at Warren Area High School, while they would take electives at the Sheffield campus. In 2025 the school board voted to end the Sheffield Area High School program altogether, with the building turned into a combined elementary and middle school facility.

The Ruth M. Smith Center operated a day care which was the sole licensed facility in the township. In the 1980s and 1990s it typically had 40 children. It closed in 2022, and by then attendance was down to eight children.

== See also ==
- List of census-designated places in Pennsylvania
