= Indian Camp Run (Brokenstraw Creek tributary) =

Stream in Pennsylvania, USA

Indian Camp Run Tributary to Brokenstraw Creek
- Location of Indian Camp Run mouth Indian Camp Run (Brokenstraw Creek tributary) (the United States)

Location
- Country: United States
- State: Pennsylvania
- County: Warren

Physical characteristics
- Source: divide between divide between Indian Camp Run, Lansing Run, and Irvine Run
  - location: about 3 miles southeast of Matthews Run, Pennsylvania
  - coordinates: 41°53′38″N 079°18′51″W
  - elevation: 1,730 ft (530 m)
- Mouth: Brokenstraw Creek
  - location: Youngsville, Pennsylvania
  - coordinates: 41°51′22″N 079°18′55″W
  - elevation: 1,184 ft (361 m)
- Length: 2.70 mi (4.35 km)
- Basin size: 2.44 square miles (6.3 km^{2})
- Discharge
  - location: Brokenstraw Creek
  - average: 4.59 cu ft/s (0.130 m^{3}/s) at mouth with Brokenstraw Creek

Basin features
- Progression: Brokenstraw Creek → Allegheny River → Ohio River → Mississippi River → Gulf of Mexico
- River system: Allegheny River
- Tributaries
  - left: unnamed tributaries
  - right: unnamed tributaries
- Bridges: Indian Camp Run Road, Mill Street

Indian Camp Run is a 2.70 mi (4.35 km) long 1st order tributary to Brokenstraw Creek. It is classed as a cold water fishery by the Pennsylvania Fish and Boat Commission.

== Course ==
Indian Camp Run rises in Warren County, Pennsylvania about 3 miles southeast of Matthews Run, Pennsylvania and flows south to meet Brokenstraw Creek at Youngsville.

== Watershed ==
Indian Camp Run drains 2.44 square miles (6.3 km^{2}) of the Pennsylvania High Plateau province and is underlaid by the Venango Formation and the Corry Sandstone through Riceville Formation. The watershed receives an average of 44.5 in/year of precipitation and has a wetness index of 335.39. The watershed is about 78% forested.

== See also ==
- List of rivers of Pennsylvania
