= Gar Run =

Stream in Pennsylvania, USA

Gar Run Tributary to Brokenstraw Creek
- Location of Gar Run mouth Gar Run (the United States)

Location
- Country: United States
- State: Pennsylvania
- County: Warren

Physical characteristics
- Source: divide between Gar Run and Oil Creek
  - location: about 2 miles east of Sanford, Pennsylvania
  - coordinates: 41°46′18″N 079°29′58″W
  - elevation: 1,775 ft (541 m)
- Mouth: Brokenstraw Creek
  - location: Garland, Pennsylvania
  - coordinates: 41°46′50″N 079°26′50″W
  - elevation: 1,286 ft (392 m)
- Length: 4.96 mi (7.98 km)
- Basin size: 18.32 square miles (47.4 km^{2})
- Discharge
  - location: Brokenstraw Creek
  - average: 31.76 cu ft/s (0.899 m^{3}/s) at mouth with Brokenstraw Creek

Basin features
- Progression: Brokenstraw Creek → Allegheny River → Ohio River → Mississippi River → Gulf of Mexico
- River system: Allegheny River
- Tributaries
  - left: Hosmer Run
  - right: unnamed tributaries
- Bridges: Ross Hill Road, PA 27

Gar Run is a 4.96 mi (7.98 km) long 3rd order tributary to Brokenstraw Creek. It is classed as a cold-water fishery by the Pennsylvania Fish and Boat Commission.

== Variant names ==
According to the Geographic Names Information System, it has also been known historically as:

- Crouse Run

== Course ==
Gar Run rises on the divide between it and Oil Creek in Warren County, Pennsylvania about 2 miles east of Sanford, Pennsylvania and flows northeast to meet Brokenstraw Creek at Garland.

== Watershed ==
Gar Run drains 18.32 square miles (47.4 km^{2}) of the Pennsylvania High Plateau province and is underlaid by the Venango Formation. The watershed receives an average of 42.6 in/year of precipitation and has a wetness index of 388.06. The watershed is about 75% forested.

== See also ==
- List of rivers of Pennsylvania
