= Eisenhower High School =

Eisenhower High School can refer to the following schools in the United States:

- Eisenhower High School (Rialto, California)
- Eisenhower High School (Blue Island, Illinois)
- Eisenhower High School (Decatur, Illinois)
- Eisenhower High School (Kansas), Goddard, Kansas
- Eisenhower High School (Michigan), Shelby Township, Michigan
- Eisenhower High School (Lawton, Oklahoma)
- Eisenhower High School (Pennsylvania), Russell, Pennsylvania
- Eisenhower High School (Houston), Houston, Texas
- Eisenhower High School (Yakima, Washington)
- New Berlin Eisenhower Middle/High School, Wisconsin
