= Hare Creek =

Hare Creek may refer to:

- Hare Creek (California), a stream in Mendocino
- Hare Creek (Brokenstraw Creek tributary), a stream in Pennsylvania
