= Andrews Run (Brokenstraw Creek tributary) =

Stream in Pennsylvania, USA

Andrews Run Tributary to Brokenstraw Creek
- Location of Andrews Run mouth Andrews Run (Brokenstraw Creek tributary) (the United States)

Location
- Country: United States
- State: Pennsylvania
- County: Warren

Physical characteristics
- Source: confluence of Birch Springs Run and Rattlesnake Run
  - location: about 3 miles south-southeast of Pittsfield, Pennsylvania
  - coordinates: 41°47′21″N 079°23′46″W
  - elevation: 1,350 ft (410 m)
- Mouth: Brokenstraw Creek
  - location: Pittsfield, Pennsylvania
  - coordinates: 41°49′50″N 079°22′41″W
  - elevation: 1,234 ft (376 m)
- Length: 3.57 mi (5.75 km)
- Basin size: 12.78 square miles (33.1 km^{2})
- Discharge
  - location: Brokenstraw Creek
  - average: 22.11 cu ft/s (0.626 m^{3}/s) at mouth with Brokenstraw Creek

Basin features
- Progression: Brokenstraw Creek → Allegheny River → Ohio River → Mississippi River → Gulf of Mexico
- River system: Allegheny River
- Tributaries
  - left: Birch Springs Run
  - right: Rattlesnake Run
- Bridges: Andrews Run Road, Davey Hill Road, Old Garland Road

Andrews Run is a 3.57 mi (5.75 km) long 3rd order tributary to Brokenstraw Creek. It is classed as a cold water fishery by the Pennsylvania Fish and Boat Commission.

== Course ==
Andrews Run is formed at the confluence of Birch Springs Run and Rattlesnake Run in Warren County, Pennsylvania about 3 miles south-southeast of Pittsfield, Pennsylvania. It then flows northeast to meet Brokenstraw Creek at Pittsfield, Pennsylvania.

== Watershed ==
Andrews Run drains 12.78 square miles (33.1 km^{2}) of the Pennsylvania High Plateau province and is underlaid by the Venango Formation, Corry Sandstone through Riceville Formation and the Shenango through Cuyahoga Group. The watershed receives an average of 43.1 in/year of precipitation and has a wetness index of 389.62. The watershed is about 79% forested.

== See also ==
- List of rivers of Pennsylvania
