= Coffee Creek (Brokenstraw Creek tributary) =

- Location of the mouth of Coffee Creek in Pennsylvania
- Etymology: "coffee"

Location
- Country: United States
- State: Pennsylvania
- County: Warren

Physical characteristics
- Source: divide between Coffee Creek and Little Brokenstraw Creek
  - location: Columbus Township, Warren County, Pennsylvania
  - coordinates: 41°55′24″N 79°28′45″W
  - elevation: 1,850 ft (560 m)
- Mouth: Brokenstraw Creek
  - location: Columbus Township, Warren County, Pennsylvania
  - coordinates: 41°56′23″N 79°34′51″W
  - elevation: 1,391 ft (424 m)
- Length: 11.2 mi (18.0 km)
- Basin size: 25.2 sq mi (65 km^{2})
- Discharge
  - average: 48.47 cu ft/s (1.373 m^{3}/s) at mouth with Brokenstraw Creek

Basin features
- Progression: Brokenstraw Creek → Allegheny River → Ohio River → Mississippi River → Gulf of Mexico
- Tributaries
  - left: Prosser Creek
  - right: Pine Valley Creek; Spring Brook
- Bridges: US 6

Coffee Creek is a 11.2-mile (18.0 km) tributary of Brokenstraw Creek in Warren County, Pennsylvania, in the United States.

Coffee Creek joins Brokenstraw Creek in Columbus Township.

== See also ==
- List of rivers of Pennsylvania
