= Blue Eye Run =

Stream in Pennsylvania, USA

Blue Eye Run Tributary to Brokenstraw Creek
- Location of Blue Eye Run mouth Blue Eye Run (the United States)

Location
- Country: United States
- State: Pennsylvania
- County: Warren

Physical characteristics
- Source: divide between Blue Eye Run and Coffee Creek
  - location: about 4 miles west of Wrightsville, Pennsylvania
  - coordinates: 41°54′20″N 079°30′04″W
  - elevation: 1,600 ft (490 m)
- Mouth: Brokenstraw Creek
  - location: about 0.5 miles east of Garland, Pennsylvania
  - coordinates: 41°48′52″N 079°30′04″W
  - elevation: 1,267 ft (386 m)
- Length: 8.10 mi (13.04 km)
- Basin size: 10.29 square miles (26.7 km^{2})
- Discharge
  - location: Brokenstraw Creek
  - average: 18.32 cu ft/s (0.519 m^{3}/s) at mouth with Brokenstraw Creek

Basin features
- Progression: Brokenstraw Creek → Allegheny River → Ohio River → Mississippi River → Gulf of Mexico
- River system: Allegheny River
- Tributaries
  - left: unnamed tributaries
  - right: unnamed tributaries
- Bridges: Eldred Hill Road, Moore Lane, PA 27

Blue Eye Run is a 8.10 mi (13.04 km) long 1st order tributary to Brokenstraw Creek. It is classed as an Exceptional Value stream by the Pennsylvania Fish and Boat Commission.

== Course ==
Blue Eye Run rises in Warren County, Pennsylvania about 4 miles west of Wrightsville, Pennsylvania and flows southeast to meet Brokenstraw Creek just east of Garland.

== Watershed ==
Blue Eye Run drains 10.29 square miles (26.7 km^{2}) of the Pennsylvania High Plateau province and is underlaid by the Venango Formation. The watershed receives an average of 43.7 in/year of precipitation and has a wetness index of 378.49. The watershed is about 82% forested.

== See also ==
- List of rivers of Pennsylvania
