= Matthews Run =

Stream in Pennsylvania, USA

Matthews Run Tributary to Brokenstraw Creek
- Location of Matthews Run mouth Matthews Run (the United States)

Location
- Country: United States
- State: Pennsylvania
- County: Warren

Physical characteristics
- Source: divide between divide between Matthews Run and Stony Creek
  - location: about 0.5 miles northeast of Pikes Rocks
  - coordinates: 41°55′35″N 079°23′09″W
  - elevation: 1,890 ft (580 m)
- Mouth: Brokenstraw Creek
  - location: Youngsville, Pennsylvania
  - coordinates: 41°51′15″N 079°19′00″W
  - elevation: 1,188 ft (362 m)
- Length: 7.05 mi (11.35 km)
- Basin size: 16.44 square miles (42.6 km^{2})
- Discharge
  - location: Brokenstraw Creek
  - average: 30.74 cu ft/s (0.870 m^{3}/s) at mouth with Brokenstraw Creek

Basin features
- Progression: Brokenstraw Creek → Allegheny River → Ohio River → Mississippi River → Gulf of Mexico
- River system: Allegheny River
- Tributaries
  - left: Patchen Run; Lansing Run
  - right: Telick Run; Browns Run
- Bridges: Stinson Hill Road, Hazeltine Hollow Road, Patchen Hill Road, Hazeltine Hollow Road, Matthews Run Road, Highland Avenue

Matthews Run is a 7.05 mi (11.35 km) long 2nd order tributary to Brokenstraw Creek. It is classed as a cold water fishery by the Pennsylvania Fish and Boat Commission.

== Variant names ==
According to the Geographic Names Information System, it has also been known historically as:

- Hazeltine Hollow Run
- Mathews Run

== Course ==
Matthews Run rises in Warren County, Pennsylvania about 0.5 miles northeast of Pikes Rocks and flows southeast to meet Brokenstraw Creek at Youngsville.

== Watershed ==
Matthews Run drains 16.44 square miles (42.6 km^{2}) of the Pennsylvania High Plateau province and is underlaid by the Venango Formation and the Corry Sandstone through Riceville Formation. The watershed receives an average of 45.0 in/year of precipitation and has a wetness index of 378.67. The watershed is about 69% forested.

== See also ==
- List of rivers of Pennsylvania
