= Mead Run (Brokenstraw Creek tributary) =

Stream in Pennsylvania, USA

Mead Run Tributary to Brokenstraw Creek
- Location of Mead Run mouth Mead Run (Brokenstraw Creek tributary) (the United States)

Location
- Country: United States
- State: Pennsylvania
- County: Warren

Physical characteristics
- Source: divide between Mead Run, Matthews Run, and Page Hollow
  - location: about 0.5 miles northeast of Nuttles Rocks
  - coordinates: 41°54′44″N 079°22′41″W
  - elevation: 1,850 ft (560 m)
- Mouth: Brokenstraw Creek
  - location: about 0.25 miles west of Youngsville, Pennsylvania
  - coordinates: 41°50′37″N 079°19′50″W
  - elevation: 1,201 ft (366 m)
- Length: 6.11 mi (9.83 km)
- Basin size: 5.61 square miles (14.5 km^{2})
- Discharge
  - location: Brokenstraw Creek
  - average: 10.19 cu ft/s (0.289 m^{3}/s) at mouth with Brokenstraw Creek

Basin features
- Progression: Brokenstraw Creek → Allegheny River → Ohio River → Mississippi River → Gulf of Mexico
- River system: Allegheny River
- Tributaries
  - left: unnamed tributaries
  - right: unnamed tributaries
- Bridges: Murray Hill Road, US 6, Old Pittsfield Road

Mead Run is a 6.11 mi (9.83 km) long 2nd order tributary to Brokenstraw Creek. It is classed as a cold water fishery by the Pennsylvania Fish and Boat Commission.

== Course ==
Mead Run rises in Warren County, Pennsylvania about 0.5 miles northeast of Nuttles Rocks and flows southeast to meet Brokenstraw Creek just west of Youngsville.

== Watershed ==
Mead Run drains 5.61 square miles (14.5 km^{2}) of the Pennsylvania High Plateau province and is underlaid by the Venango Formation, Corry Sandstone through Riceville Formation, and the Shenango through Cuyahoga Group. The watershed receives an average of 44.0 in/year of precipitation and has a wetness index of 378.06. The watershed is about 69% forested.

== See also ==
- List of rivers of Pennsylvania
