= Spring Creek (Brokenstraw Creek tributary) =

Stream in Pennsylvania, USA

Spring Creek Tributary to Brokenstraw Creek
- Location of Spring Creek mouth Spring Creek (Brokenstraw Creek tributary) (the United States)

Location
- Country: United States
- State: Pennsylvania
- County: Warren

Physical characteristics
- Source: divide between Spring Creek and East Branch Oil Creek
  - location: about 2 miles southwest of East Branch, Pennsylvania
  - coordinates: 41°46′45″N 079°35′30″W
  - elevation: 1,670 ft (510 m)
- Mouth: Brokenstraw Creek
  - location: about 0.5 miles south of Spring Creek, Pennsylvania
  - coordinates: 41°51′47″N 079°30′54″W
  - elevation: 1,358 ft (414 m)
- Length: 10.69 mi (17.20 km)
- Basin size: 101.07 square miles (261.8 km^{2})
- Discharge
  - location: Brokenstraw Creek
  - average: 73.06 cu ft/s (2.069 m^{3}/s) at mouth with Brokenstraw Creek

Basin features
- Progression: Brokenstraw Creek → Allegheny River → Ohio River → Mississippi River → Gulf of Mexico
- River system: Allegheny River
- Tributaries
  - left: Coolspring Creek; Whitney Run; Ferrin Run
  - right: East Branch Spring Creek; Cobbs Run
- Bridges: State Lot Road, Hyde Road, Knapp Road, Oil Creek Road, Jackson Hill Road

Spring Creek is a 10.69 mi (17.20 km) long 3rd order tributary to Brokenstraw Creek. It is classed as a High-quality cold-water fishery by the Pennsylvania Fish and Boat Commission.

== Course ==
Spring Creek rises on the divide between it and East Branch Oil Creek in Warren County, Pennsylvania about 2 miles southwest of East Branch, Pennsylvania and flows northeast to meet Brokenstraw Creek south of Spring Creek, Pennsylvania.

== Watershed ==
Spring Creek drains 39.02 square miles (101.1 km^{2}) of the Pennsylvania High Plateau province and the northwestern glaciated plateau and is underlaid by the Venango Formation. The watershed receives an average of 44.4 in/year of precipitation and has a wetness index of 437.71. The watershed is about 64% forested.

== See also ==
- List of rivers of Pennsylvania
