= Youngsville High School =

Youngsville Middle/High School

Location
- 227 College Street; Youngsville, Pennsylvania 16371; United States
- Coordinates: 41.8522°N 79.3147°W

Information
- School type: Public Senior High School
- Established: 1905
- School district: Warren County School District
- NCES District ID: 4224820
- Superintendent: Amy Stewart
- NCES School ID: 422482004135
- Principal: Amy Beers
- Faculty: 28.67 (FTE)
- Grades: 9–12
- Student to teacher ratio: 12.42
- Classes offered: 187
- Campus size: 104, 995 Square Feet / 17 Acre Site
- Colors: Red and White
- Athletics: Corey Copley, Athletic Director
- Athletics conference: PIAA District X
- Mascot: Eagles
- Yearbook: Aquila
- Communities served: Youngsville
- Feeder schools: Youngsville Elementary/Middle School
- Website: Youngsville High School

Youngsville High School was one of four secondary campuses operated in Warren County, Pennsylvania, by the Warren County School District. The Youngsville campus was built in 1905 and had its last major set of renovations and additions in 1985.

The school day began at 8 AM and ends at 3:14PM. The school day was broken into seven periods, plus an advisory before 6th period and a two-tiered lunch grouping. Most students had one period a day where they attend a study hall instead of a course.

There were three computer labs in the building.

In 2025 the school board closed the high school. High school students were moved to Eisenhower Middle/High School.

== Awards ==
A three-person team of Youngsville High School seniors won the 2017 Warren County Teen Driving Competition. The competition challenged the teens to demonstrate their skills and knowledge through a combination of a slow-drive obstacle course, a pre-trip vehicle assessment, as well as written and perception tests.

== Athletics ==
Youngsville participates in PIAA District 10:

Sport Name	Boys/Class	Girls/Class
Baseball	Class A	
Basketball	Class AA	Class A
Cross country	Class AA	Class AA
Softball		Class A
Track and Field	Class AA	Class AA
Volleyball		Class A
Wrestling	Class AA	

Youngsville won the Region Championship in football most recently in 2011, going 10-0 for an undefeated season. The school's football team was lost in March 2017, when the school district decided to combine the team with that of Warren Area High School.

== Clubs ==
The following is a list of clubs offered at YHS:

- Academic Bowl
- Aquila, Yearbook
- Broadwalk
- Crossroads
- Eagle Eye
- French
- National Honor Society
- SADD
- Science
- Spanish
- Spirit
- Student Council
- Technology Student Association (TSA)
- Tutoring

== Vocational education opportunities ==
Sophomores, Juniors, and Seniors at Youngsville have the opportunity to spend half of each school day at the Warren County Career Center in Warren, where they can learn from one of fourteen career programs, as well as earn advanced placement credits for post-secondary education in some cases.

== Shutdown ==
On January 13, 2025, it was decided that Youngsville High School would be shut down at the end of the 2024-25 school year. Students in grades 9-12 would be moved to Eisenhower High School in Russell, Pennsylvania. Students in grades 6-8 would be moved to Youngsville Elementary School.
