= Little Brokenstraw Creek =

Stream in Pennsylvania, USA

Little Brokenstraw Creek Tributary to Brokenstraw Creek
- Location of Little Brokenstraw Creek mouth Little Brokenstraw Creek (the United States)

Location
- Country: United States
- States: Pennsylvania; New York
- County: Warren; Chautauqua

Physical characteristics
- Source: confluence of Little Brokenstraw Creek and French Creek
  - location: about 3 miles south-southeast of Pittsfield, Pennsylvania
  - coordinates: 42°05′52″N 079°32′04″W
  - elevation: 1,750 ft (530 m)
- Mouth: Brokenstraw Creek
  - location: Pittsfield, Pennsylvania
  - coordinates: 41°49′59″N 079°23′03″W
  - elevation: 1,234 ft (376 m)
- Length: 27.56 mi (44.35 km)
- Basin size: 79.45 square miles (205.8 km^{2})
- Discharge
  - location: Brokenstraw Creek
  - average: 142.89 cu ft/s (4.046 m^{3}/s) at mouth with Brokenstraw Creek

Basin features
- Progression: Brokenstraw Creek → Allegheny River → Ohio River → Mississippi River → Gulf of Mexico
- River system: Allegheny River
- Tributaries
  - left: East Branch Little Brokenstraw Creek; Deer Creek; Stony Creek; Page Hollow
  - right: Deadmans Run; Miles Run; Taylor Run; Barton Run
- Bridges: Wiltsie Road, West Main Street, South Street, Panama Bear Lake Road (x2), Dole Swamp Road, North Road, Valastaik Road, PA 957, Kidder Road, Bull Hill Road, PA 958, Nelson Hill Road, US 6, Muzzle Loaders Lane, Barton Road, PA 27

Little Brokenstraw Creek is a 27.56 mi (44.35 km) long 3rd order tributary to Brokenstraw Creek. Little Brokenstraw Creek and its tributaries are classed as a cold water fisheries by the Pennsylvania Fish and Boat Commission.

== Variant names ==
According to the Geographic Names Information System, it has also been known historically as:

- Cosh-not-e-a-go
- Little Brocken Straw Creek
- Little Broken Straw Creek

== Course ==
Little Brokenstraw Creek rises on the French Creek divide about 2 miles northeast of Wickwire Corners, New York. It then flows southeast into Pennsylvania to meet Brokenstraw Creek at Pittsfield, Pennsylvania.

== Watershed ==
Little Brokenstraw Creek drains 79.45 square miles (205.8 km^{2}) of primarily the Venango Formation. The watershed receives an average of 43.1 in/year of precipitation and has a wetness index of 444.38. The watershed is about 61% forested.

== See also ==
- List of rivers of Pennsylvania
