= Sheffield Area Middle/High School =

Coordinates: 41.71639°N 79.04464°W

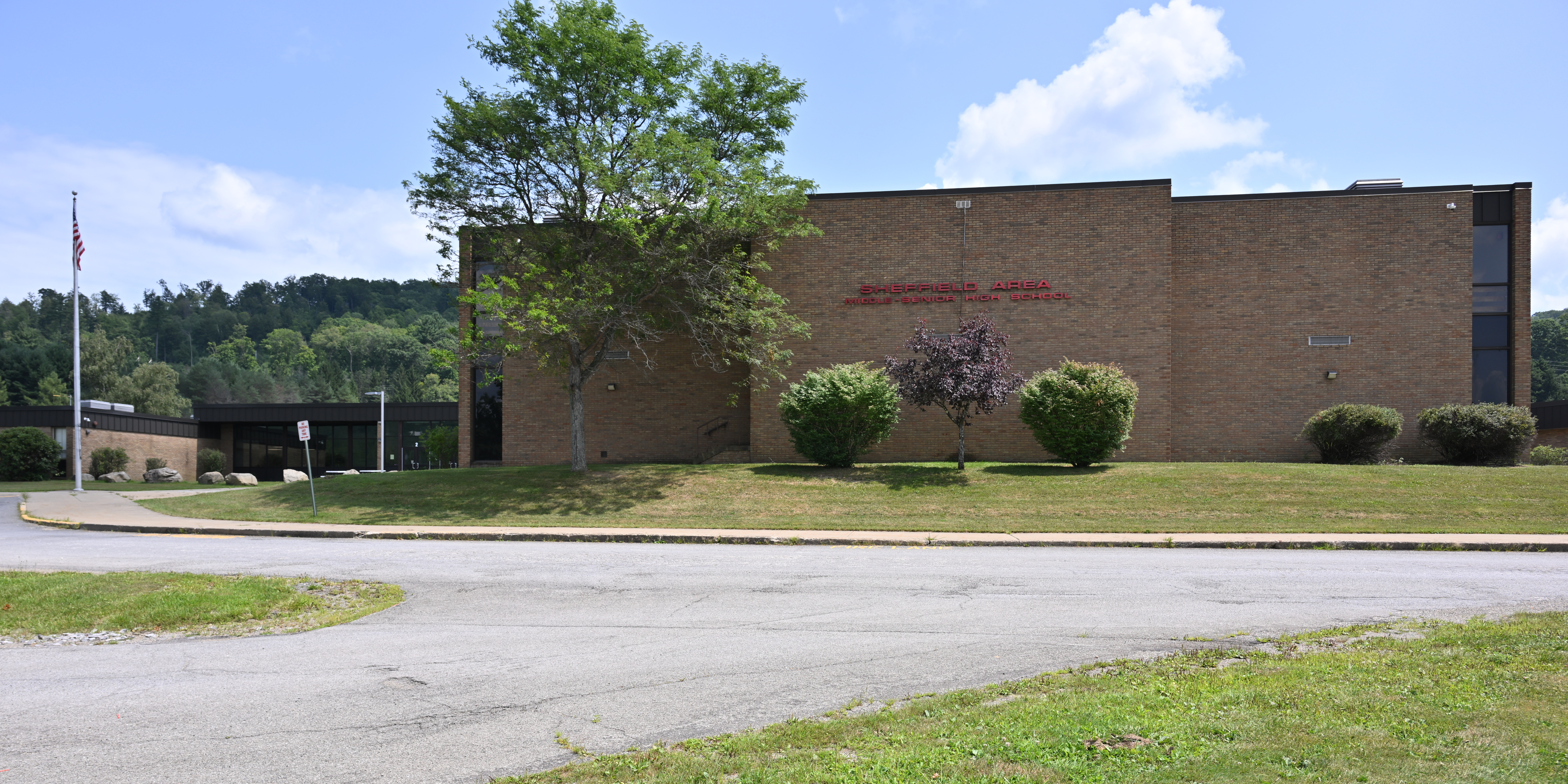

Location
- 6760 US Route 6 Sheffield Township, Warren County, Pennsylvania; Sheffield, Pennsylvania 16347

Information
- Type: Public
- Opened: 1975
- School district: Warren County School District
- NCES District ID: 4224820
- NCES School ID: 422482004146
- Principal: Glenn Smith
- Teaching staff: 21.15 (FTE)
- Grades: 6–12
- Enrollment: 295 (2017–18)
- Student to teacher ratio: 13.95
- Campus size: 102,230 Sq. Ft. / 43 Acre Site
- Campus type: Rural (Distant)
- Colors: Orange, Black, and White
- Athletics conference: PIAA District IX
- Mascot: Wolverine
- Communities served: Clarendon, Sheffield
- Feeder schools: Allegheny Valley Elementary School and Sheffield Elementary School
- Website: Sheffield Area Middle/High School

Sheffield Area Middle/High School was a public middle and high school located in the middle of Pennsylvania's Allegheny National Forest. The Sheffield campus is located in the Sheffield census-designated place, Sheffield Township, along US Route 6 between Clarendon and Sheffield in eastern Warren County and is located on a 43-acre (17 ha) site. Sheffield Area Middle School/High School was one of four high schools operated by the Warren County School District.

The enrollment was about 600 in 1980, and by spring 2024 it was down to 224. In the 2024-2025 school year, due to a lack of employees, the school district began requiring Sheffield area high school students to take core classes at Warren Area High School, while they would take electives at Sheffield Area Middle-High. In 2025 the school board voted to close the high school, and the building was to be repurposed into a combined elementary and middle school.

== Extracurriculars ==
The district offers a variety of clubs, activities and sports.

=== Athletics ===
The following athletic sports are held at Sheffield Area, which participates in PIAA District IX.

Sport	Boys/Class	Girls/Class
Basketball	Class A	Class A
Football	Class AA	
Marching band	Class A	Class A
Softball		Class A
Track and Field	Class AA	Class AA
Volleyball		Class A
Wrestling	Class AA	

==== Cooperative Sports ====
There is also an opportunity for students to participate in the following cooperative sports at Warren Area High School:

- Baseball
- Cross Country
- Golf
- Swimming

=== Clubs ===
The following clubs are offered at Sheffield Area:

- Academic Bowl
- Art
- Home Economics
- JETS
- National Honor Society
- SADD
- Steel Drum
- Student Council
- Varsity Club
- Yearbook

== Vocational education opportunities ==
Sophomores, Juniors and Seniors at Sheffield Area have the opportunity to spend one-half of each school day at the Warren County Career Center in Warren where they can learn from one of fourteen career programs, as well as the possibility of earning advanced placement credits for post-secondary education.
