= Hare Creek (Brokenstraw Creek tributary) =

Stream in Pennsylvania, USA

Hare Creek Tributary to Brokenstraw Creek
- Location of Hare Creek mouth Hare Creek (Brokenstraw Creek tributary) (the United States)

Location
- Country: United States
- State: Pennsylvania; New York
- County: Warren; Erie; Chautauqua

Physical characteristics
- Source: divide between Hare Creek and French Creek
  - location: about 2 miles southeast of Cutting, New York
  - coordinates: 42°00′27″N 079°40′42″W
  - elevation: 1,525 ft (465 m)
- Mouth: Brokenstraw Creek
  - location: about 3 miles southeast of Corry, Pennsylvania
  - coordinates: 41°54′09″N 079°34′04″W
  - elevation: 1,368 ft (417 m)
- Length: 12.05 mi (19.39 km)
- Basin size: 30.10 square miles (78.0 km^{2})
- Discharge
  - location: Brokenstraw Creek
  - average: 60.28 cu ft/s (1.707 m^{3}/s) at mouth with Brokenstraw Creek

Basin features
- Progression: Brokenstraw Creek → Allegheny River → Ohio River → Mississippi River → Gulf of Mexico
- River system: Allegheny River
- Tributaries
  - left: unnamed tributaries
  - right: Bear Creek; Winton Run
- Bridges: State Line Road, Crosscut Road, Sciota Road, Corry Junction Greenway Trail, US 6, Sciota Street, North Shady Avenue, Scott's Crossing Road, Spring Creek Corry Road, Locey Road,

Hare Creek is a 12.05 mi (19.39 km) long 3rd order tributary to Brokenstraw Creek. It is classed as a cold-water/warm-water fishery by the Pennsylvania Fish and Boat Commission.

== Course ==
Hare Creek rises on the divide between it and French Creek in Chautauqua County, New York about 2 miles southeast of Cutting and flows southeast to meet Brokenstraw Creek about 3 miles southeast of Corry, Pennsylvania.

== Watershed ==
Hare Creek drains 30.10 square miles (78.0 km^{2}) of the northwestern glaciated plateau and is underlaid by the Venango Formation. The watershed receives an average of 47.4 in/year of precipitation and has a wetness index of 457.12. The watershed is about 47% forested.

== See also ==
- List of rivers of Pennsylvania
