= Garland, Pennsylvania =

Unincorporated community in Pennsylvania, US

- Unincorporated community
- Location within Pennsylvania
- Coordinates: 41°48′58″N 79°26′38″W
- Country: United States
- State: Pennsylvania
- County: Warren
- Elevation: 1,293 ft (394 m)
- Time zone: UTC-5 (Eastern (EST))
  - Summer (DST): UTC-4 (EDT)
- ZIP code: 16416
- Area code: 814
- GNIS feature ID: 1175452

Garland is an unincorporated community in Warren County, Pennsylvania, United States. The community is on Pennsylvania Route 27, 6.9 miles (11.1 km) west-southwest of Youngsville. Garland has a post office with ZIP code 16416.
