= Eisenhower Middle/High School =

Coordinates: 41.96245°N 79.20290°W

Location
- 3700 State Route 957; Russell, Pennsylvania 16345; United States

Information
- Type: Public
- Opened: 1956
- School district: Warren County School District
- NCES District ID: 4224820
- NCES School ID: 422482004143
- Principal: Amy Beers
- Teaching staff: 28.84 (FTE)
- Grades: 6-12
- Enrollment: 416 (2023–2024)
- Student to teacher ratio: 14.42
- Campus size: 121,406 Sq. Ft.
- Athletics conference: PIAA District 10
- Mascot: Knights
- Communities served: Russell, Sugar Grove
- Feeder schools: Eisenhower Elementary School
- Website: Eisenhower Middle/High School

Eisenhower Middle/High School is a Grades 6–12 school near Russell, Pennsylvania that serves around 550 pupils. Eisenhower was constructed in 1956 and the last renovation was completed in 2014 / 2015. It is one of four high schools in the Warren County School District.

In 2025 Youngsville High School closed, and that zone was given to Eisenhower High School.

== Extracurriculars ==
The district offers a variety of clubs, activities and sports.

=== Athletics ===
Eisenhower participated in PIAA District 10:

Sport	Boys/Class	Girls/Class
Baseball	Class A	
Basketball	Class A	Class A
Cross Country	Class A	Class A
Football	Class A	
Golf	Class AAAA	
Soccer	Class A	Class A
Softball		Class A
Track and Field	Class AA	Class AA
Volleyball		Class A
Wrestling	Class AA	

Students at Eisenhower can also participate at cooperative sports at Warren Area High School for Swimming.

=== Clubs and activities ===
The following extracurriculars are available at Eisenhower Middle/High School.

- Academic Bowl
- Audio Visual
- Club Crossroads (Christian Fellowship)
- Concert Band (Senior High or Middle School)
- Jazz Band
- Key Club
- Middle Level Choir
- National Honor Society
- Prom Committee
- SADD
- Senior Choir
- Spanish
- Student Council
- Trap Team
- Yearbook

== Vocational education opportunities ==
Sophomores, Juniors and Seniors at Eisenhower have the opportunity to spend one-half of each school day at the Warren County Career Center in Warren where they can learn from one of fourteen career programs, as well as the possibility of earning advanced placement credits for post-secondary education.
