= Warren Area High School =

Coordinates: 41.8577°N 79.1359°W

Location
- 345 East Fifth Avenue; Warren, Pennsylvania 16365; United States

Information
- School type: Public
- Established: 1928
- School district: Warren County School District
- NCES District ID: 4224820
- NCES School ID: 422482004149
- Principal: Josh Vincent
- Teaching staff: 51.59 (FTE)
- Grades: 9–12
- Enrollment: 693 (2023–2024)
- Student to teacher ratio: 13.43
- Campus size: 146,253 square feet (13,587.3 m^{2})
- Colors: Blue and White
- Mascot: Dragons
- Feeder schools: Beaty-Warren Middle School
- Website: Warren Area High School

Warren Area High School (WAHS) is a government-funded high school in Warren, Pennsylvania, built 1961. The school has 743 students as of the 2017–2018 school year. It is one of four high schools operated by Warren County School District. The WAHS mascot is a dragon. There is also Warren County Career Center located on the WAHS campus, offering vocational-technical education opportunities to students in grades 10-12. The campus includes the Warren Area Elementary Center (Grades K–4). After graduating from Beaty-Warren Middle School (Grades 5–8), students proceed to Warren Area High School (Grades 9–12).

WAHS was established long before 1961. The current campus was built in 1961. The predecessor graduated its last class that year. Its third story was condemned as a fire hazard in 1928 and restored to functioning in 1959. Today it has 2½ stories (the "pit", the first floor and second floor) as well as a basement, and consists of a gymnasium, cafeteria, auditorium, courtyard, study hall, library, 2 lobbies and much more. WAHS is owned and operated by the Warren County School District.

The school underwent a major renovation, which was completed in 2018. The new campus features a new media center, gymnasium, band and choir rooms, aesthetics, and classrooms.

== History and renovation ==
The old Warren High School was built in 1896-97 and was located in the city of Warren at the corner of 2nd Avenue and Market Street.

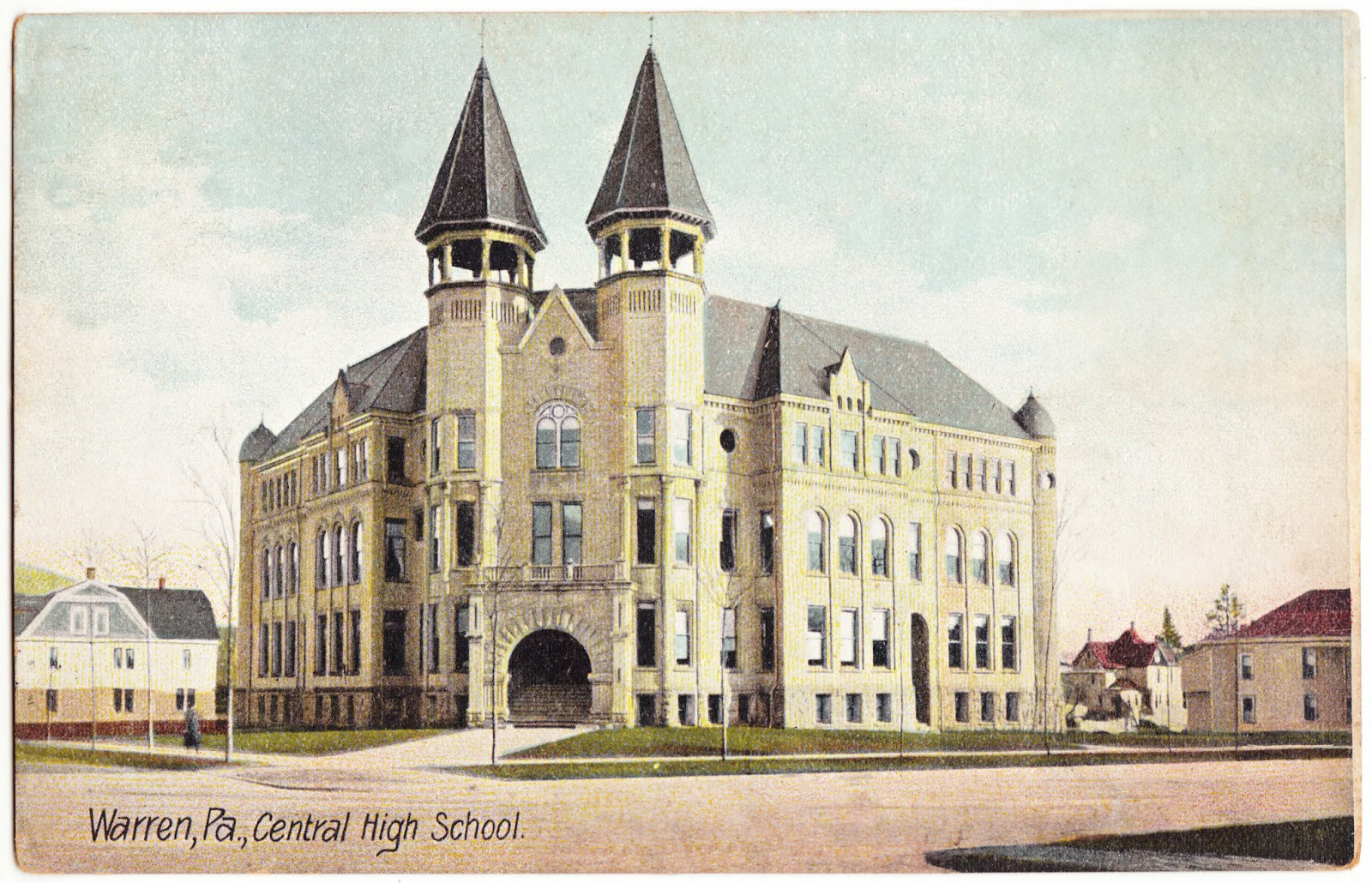

That building went out of use in 1960, as a new school had been built in 1958 at the present day location of 345 East Fifth Avenue. The old building was razed in 1961. In 2018, a twenty-five million dollar renovation was completed by architect Buchart Horn to update the exterior and interior.

In 2025 the high school of Sheffield Area Middle/High School closed, and high school students there were rezoned to Warren Area High School.

== Extracurriculars ==
The district offers a wide variety of clubs, activities and sports.

Sports that are interscholastic are boys and girls tennis, wrestling, football, boys and girls swimming/diving, boys and girls golf, soccer, boys and girls basketball, softball, baseball, girls volleyball, cross country, and track and field. The athletics participate in District 10 and Region 4 in Northwestern Pennsylvania.

=== Athletics ===
WAHS is in PIAA District 10.

Sport	Boys/Class	Girls/Class
Baseball	Class AAA	
Basketball	Class AAA	Class AAA
Cross country	Class AAA	Class AAA
Football	Class AA	
Golf	Class AAAA	Class AAAA
Soccer	Class AA	Class AA
Swimming	Class AAA	Class AAA
Tennis	Class AA	Class AA
Track and Field	Class AAA	Class AAA
Volleyball		Class AA
Wrestling	Class AA	

== Vocational education opportunities ==
Sophomores, Juniors and Seniors at Warren Area have the opportunity to spend one-half of each school day at the Warren County Career Center, located nearby where they can learn from one of fourteen career programs, as well as the possibility of earning advanced placement credits for post-secondary education.
