= Warren County School District =

School district in Pennsylvania

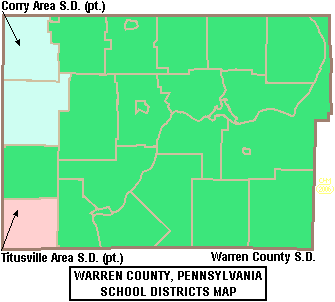

Address
- 6820 Market St Russell, Pa 16345, Pennsylvania, 16345; United States

District information
- Type: Public
- Superintendent: Mr. Gary Weber

Other information
- Website: www.wcsdpa.org

The Warren County School District (WCSD) is a public school district in Warren County, Pennsylvania, and it is designed to encompass all but three county municipalities. It has four attendance areas: North, East, West and Central. Warren County School District encompasses approximately 792 square miles. According to 2000 federal census data, it serves a resident population of 40,689. In 2009, the residents' per capita income was $17,898, while median family income was $42,714. In the Commonwealth, the median family income was $49,501 and the United States median family income was $49,445, in 2010.

== Schools ==
- Beaty-Warren Middle School
- Eisenhower Middle/High School
- Sheffield Elementary/Middle School
- Warren Area Elementary Center
- Warren Area High School
- Youngsville Elementary/Middle School
- Warren County Career Center
- Learning Enrichment Center

Former schools

- Russell Elementary School
- Sheffield Area Middle/High School - High school closed in 2025, with building changed into a combined elementary and middle school.
- South Street Early Learning Center
- Sugar Grove Elementary School
- Youngsville Middle/High School - High school closed in 2025.
