= Youngsville, Pennsylvania =

Borough in Pennsylvania, US

- Borough
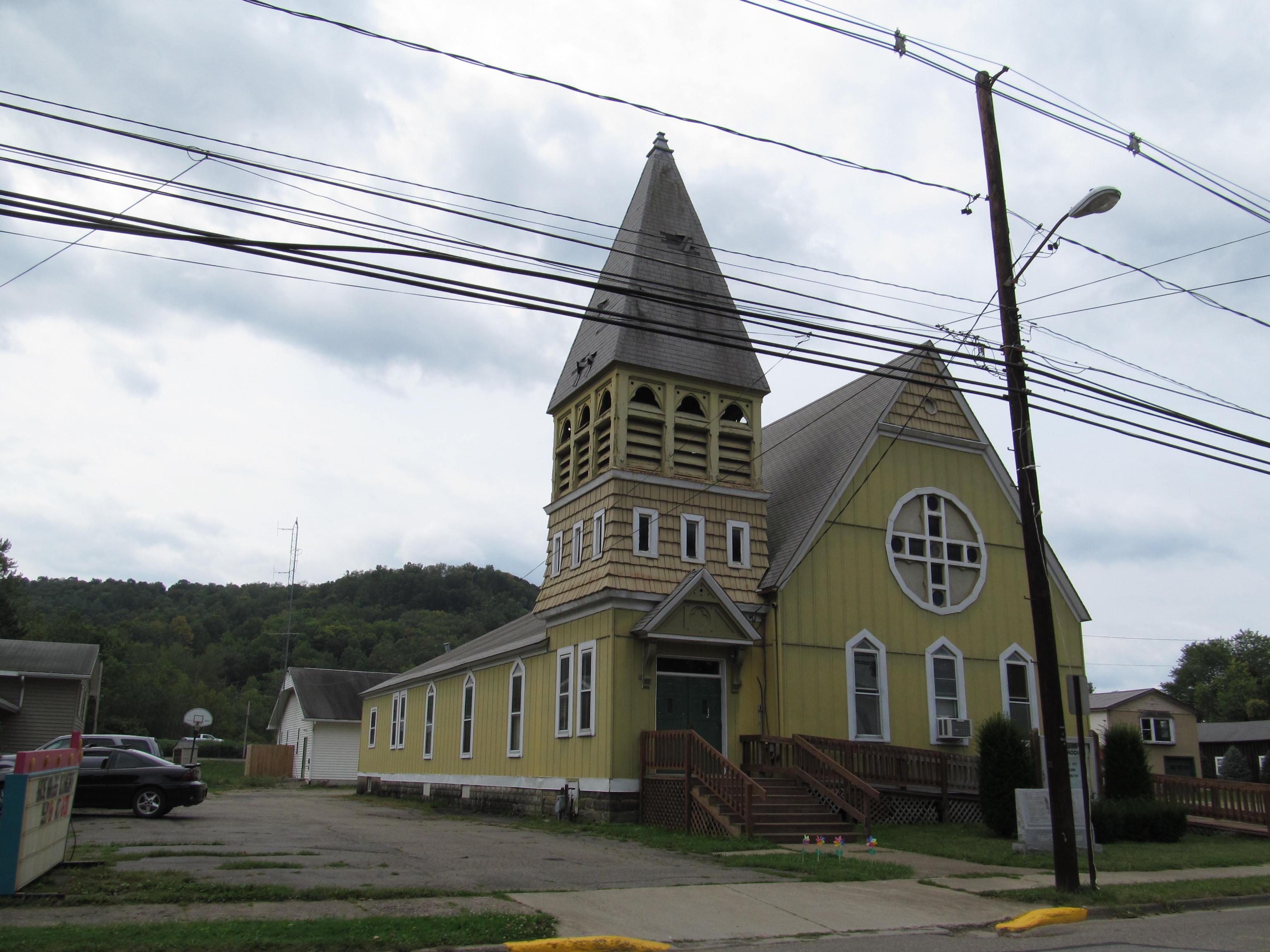

- Location of Youngsville in Warren County, Pennsylvania.
- Coordinates: 41°51′12″N 79°19′7″W
- Country: United States
- State: Pennsylvania
- County: Warren
- Founded: 1796

Government
  - Mayor: Scott Nelson

Area
  - Total: 1.33 sq mi (3.45 km^{2})
  - Land: 1.33 sq mi (3.45 km^{2})
  - Water: 0 sq mi (0.00 km^{2})

Population (2010)
  - Total: 1,729
  - Estimate (2019): 1,612
  - Density: 1,211.6/sq mi (467.82/km^{2})
- Time zone: UTC-4 (EST)
  - Summer (DST): UTC-5 (EDT)
- ZIP code: 16371
- Area code: 814
- FIPS code: 42-87224
- Website: www.youngsvilleboro.org

Youngsville is a borough in Warren County, Pennsylvania, United States. The population was 1,731 at the 2020 census.

== Geography ==
Youngsville is located at 41°51′12″N 79°19′7″W (41.853460, -79.318614).

According to the United States Census Bureau, the borough has a total area of 1.3 square miles (3.4 km^{2}), all land.

== Demographics ==
Historical population
Census	Pop.	Note	%±
1850	363		—
1860	421		16.0%
1870	402		−4.5%
1880	606		50.7%
1890	667		10.1%
1900	836		25.3%
1910	1,406		68.2%
1920	1,611		14.6%
1930	1,907		18.4%
1940	1,909		0.1%
1950	1,944		1.8%
1960	2,211		13.7%
1970	2,158		−2.4%
1980	2,006		−7.0%
1990	1,775		−11.5%
2000	1,834		3.3%
2010	1,729		−5.7%
2020	1,726		−0.2%

As of the census of 2020, there were 1,731 people, 656 households, and 533 families living in the borough. The population density was 1,143.2 people per square mile (441.4 people/km^{2}). There were 732 housing units at an average density of 617.9 per square mile (238.6/km^{2}). The racial makeup of the borough was 97.5% White, 0.3% Black or African American, 0.2% Native American, 0% Asian, 0.2% from other races, and 1.8% from two or more races. Hispanic or Latino of any race were 0.60% of the population.

There were 656 households, out of which 38% had children under the age of 18 living with them, 78.4% were married couples living together, 17.6% had a female householder with no husband present, and 2.8% were non-families. 27.0% of all households were made up of individuals, and 13.7% had someone living alone who was 65 years of age or older. The average household size was 2.3 and the average family size was 2.89.

In the borough the population was spread out, with 26% under the age of 18, 6.3% from 18 to 24, 25.7% from 25 to 44, 25.3% from 45 to 64, and 21% who were 65 years of age or older. The median age was 45.3 years. For every 100 females there were 87.0 males. For every 100 females age 18 and over, there were 86.4 males.

The median income for a household in the borough was $54,375, and the median income for a family was $40,185. Males had a median income of $32,778 versus $20,380 for females. The per capita income for the borough was $30,346. About 10.2% of families and 8.2% of the population were below the poverty line, including 5% of those under age 18 and 5% of those age 65 or over.

== Education ==
It is in the Warren County School District. The district operates Youngsville Elementary/Middle School, and Eisenhower Middle/High School.

The district formerly operated Youngsville Middle/High School until 2025.

== Notable people ==
- Guy Hecker, major league baseball pitcher, threw a no-hitter
- LouAnne Johnson, writer, teacher and former United States Marine
- Walter Sheffer, photographer and teacher
- Michael Shine, former United States Olympic athlete
