= Pittsfield Township, Pennsylvania =

Township in Pennsylvania, United States

Coordinates: 41°52′36″N 79°22′28″W

Pittsfield Township
- Township
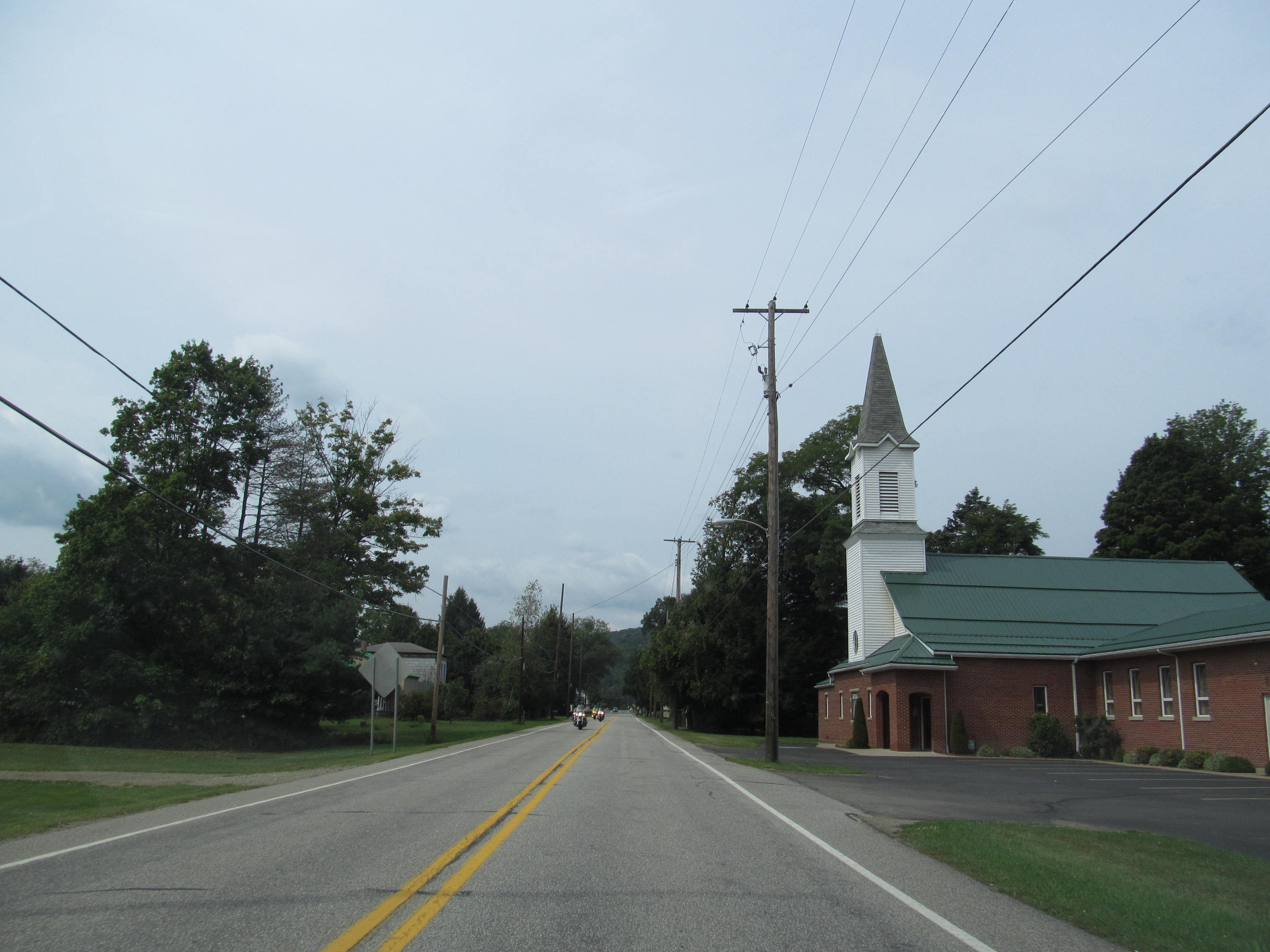
- Westbound PA 27 in the village of Pittsfield

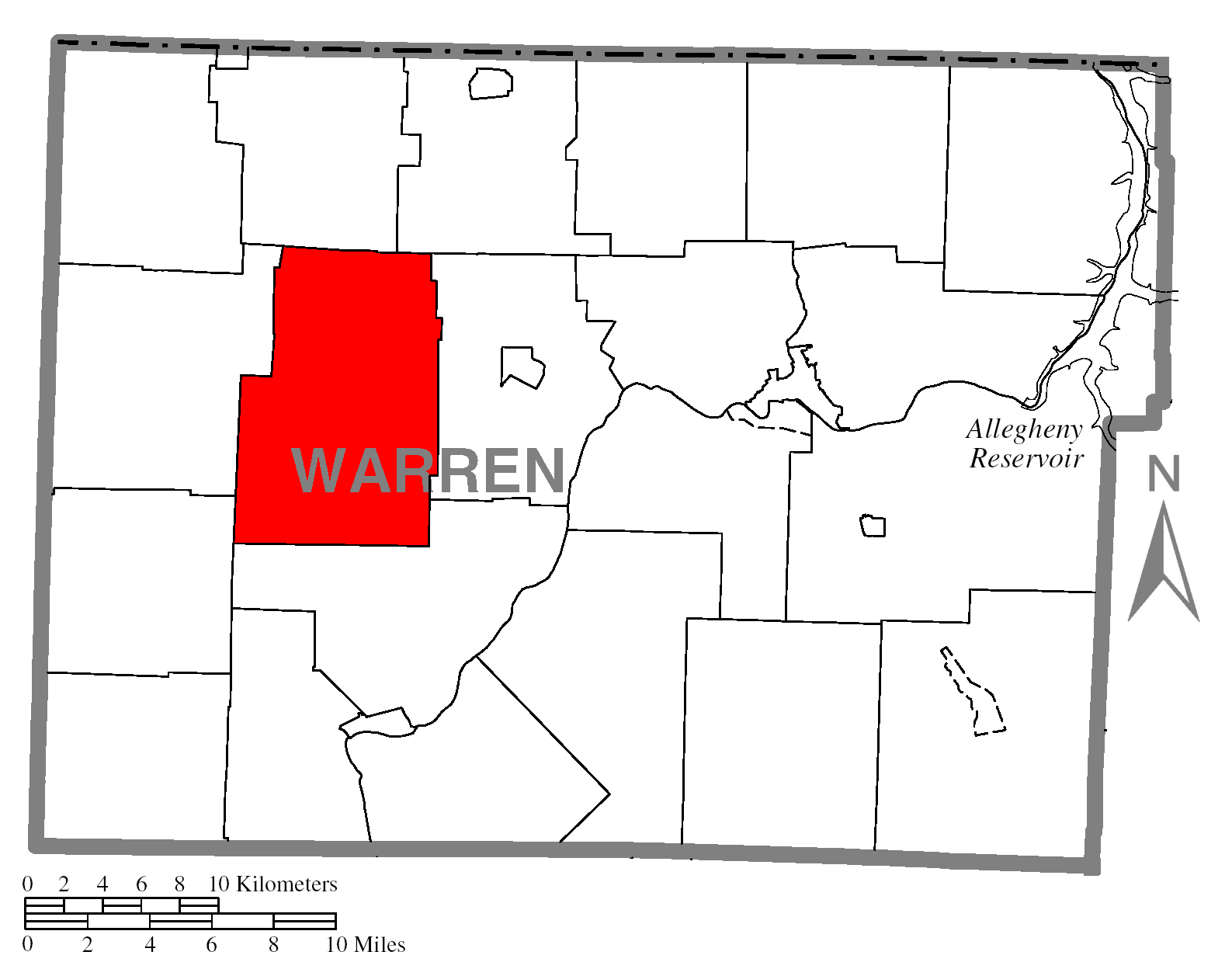
- Location of Pittsfield Township in Warren County

- Location of Warren County in Pennsylvania
- Country: United States
- State: Pennsylvania
- County: Warren

Area
  - Total: 55.65 sq mi (144.12 km^{2})
  - Land: 55.65 sq mi (144.12 km^{2})
  - Water: 0 sq mi (0.00 km^{2})

Population (2020)
  - Total: 1,282
  - Estimate (2024): 1,242
  - Density: 24/sq mi (9.4/km^{2})
- Time zone: UTC-4 (EST)
  - Summer (DST): UTC-5 (EDT)
- Area code: 814
- FIPS code: 42-123-61040

Pittsfield Township is a township in Warren County, Pennsylvania, United States. The population was 1,282 at the 2020 census, down from 1,405 at the 2010 census. 1,519 at the 2000 census.

== Geography ==
According to the United States Census Bureau, the township has a total area of 55.6 square miles (144 km^{2}), all land.

== Demographics ==
Historical population
Census	Pop.	Note	%±
2000	1,519		—
2010	1,405		−7.5%
2020	1,282		−8.8%
2024 (est.)	1,242		−3.1%
U.S. Decennial Census

As of the census of 2000, there were 1,519 people, 594 households, and 453 families residing in the township. The population density was 27.3 people per square mile (10.5 people/km^{2}). There were 766 housing units at an average density of 13.8 per square mile (5.3/km^{2}). The racial makeup of the township was 99.74% White, 0.13% Native American, and 0.13% from two or more races. Hispanic or Latino of any race were 0.13% of the population.

There were 594 households, out of which 35.9% had children under the age of 18 living with them, 64.1% were married couples living together, 6.9% had a female householder with no husband present, and 23.7% were non-families. 21.2% of all households were made up of individuals, and 7.9% had someone living alone who was 65 years of age or older. The average household size was 2.56 and the average family size was 2.95.

In the township the population was spread out, with 26.0% under the age of 18, 6.3% from 18 to 24, 28.0% from 25 to 44, 28.1% from 45 to 64, and 11.6% who were 65 years of age or older. The median age was 38 years. For every 100 females, there were 106.9 males. For every 100 females age 18 and over, there were 98.9 males.

The median income for a household in the township was $37,313, and the median income for a family was $41,023. Males had a median income of $32,679 versus $22,098 for females. The per capita income for the township was $15,661. About 8.1% of families and 11.9% of the population were below the poverty line, including 14.6% of those under age 18 and 7.2% of those age 65 or over.
