= National Register of Historic Places listings in Peekskill, New York =

This is a list of the National Register of Historic Places entries in Peekskill, New York. See also National Register of Historic Places listings in Westchester County, New York for all other listings in the county.

This is intended to be a complete list of properties and districts listed on the National Register of Historic Places in Peekskill, New York. The locations of National Register properties and districts (at least for all showing latitude and longitude coordinates below) may be seen in an online map by clicking on "Map of all coordinates".

This National Park Service list is complete through NPS recent listings posted June 6, 2026.

== Current listings ==
	Name on the Register	Image	Date listed	Location	City or town	Description
1	Beecher-McFadden Estate	Beecher-McFadden Estate	November 2, 1987 (#87001894)	E. Main St. 41°17′54″N 73°53′44″W	Peekskill	
2	Drum Hill High School	Drum Hill High School	December 31, 1979 (#79003797)	Ringgold St. 41°17′17″N 73°55′25″W	Peekskill	
3	Gustav and Marion Fleischmann House		July 30, 2021 (#100006769)	1425 Riverview Ave. 41°17′13″N 73°54′44″W	Peekskill	
4	Ford Administration Building	Ford Administration Building	April 12, 2006 (#06000258)	1031 Elm St. 41°17′17″N 73°55′01″W	Peekskill	Now the Peekskill City School District Administration Building
5	Nelson Avenue-Fort Hill Historic District	Nelson Avenue-Fort Hill Historic District	May 4, 2006 (#06000335)	Roughly along Nelson Ave., John St., Diven St., Constant St., Orchard St., Pauling St., and Decatur Ave. 41°17′48″N 73°55′19″W	Peekskill	19th-century residential area with many late Victorian houses
6	Thomas Nelson House	Thomas Nelson House	August 8, 2001 (#01000846)	1231 Seymour Ln. 41°17′48″N 73°54′49″W	Peekskill	
7	Peekskill Downtown Historic District	Peekskill Downtown Historic District	May 6, 2005 (#04000095)	Main, Division, South, Park, Bank, Brown, First and Esther Sts., Central and Union Aves. 41°17′26″N 73°55′12″W	Peekskill	Core of 19th-century Peekskill with landmark Moorish Revival tower at Division and Park streets.
8	Peekskill Freight Depot	Peekskill Freight Depot	October 27, 2004 (#04001207)	41 S. Water St. 41°17′23″N 73°55′48″W	Peekskill	Abraham Lincoln stopped here on the way to his inauguration and gave a 138-word speech attended by 1,000 people, approximately a third of the population of Peekskill at the time. It was his only appearance ever in Westchester County. Current building is only intact freight depot along former Hudson River Railroad.
9	Peekskill Presbyterian Church	Peekskill Presbyterian Church	December 4, 2002 (#02001400)	705 South St. 41°17′19″N 73°55′27″W	Peekskill	1846 church has had same bell since congregation was founded in 1790s.
10	St. Peter's Episcopal Church	St. Peter's Episcopal Church	July 5, 2003 (#03000598)	137 N. Division St. 41°17′33″N 73°55′10″W	Peekskill	1892 neo-Gothic church by Richard M. Upjohn
11	Standard House	Standard House	September 22, 2000 (#00001158)	50 Hudson Ave. 41°17′09″N 73°55′49″W	Peekskill	1855 Italianate commercial building, recently restored, is one of only two hotels remaining from industrial era. Now home to its economic-development department
12	US Post Office-Peekskill	US Post Office-Peekskill	May 11, 1989 (#88002401)	738 South St. 41°17′22″N 73°55′24″W	Peekskill	Palladian windows not often found on pre-New Deal Colonial Revival post offices
13	Van Cortlandt Upper Manor House	Van Cortlandt Upper Manor House	April 2, 1981 (#81000417)	Oregon Rd. 41°18′44″N 73°54′22″W	Peekskill	
14	Villa Loretto	Villa Loretto	April 27, 1989 (#88000148)	Crompond Rd. 41°17′25″N 73°54′13″W	Peekskill	

== See also ==
- National Register of Historic Places listings in New York
- National Register of Historic Places listings in Westchester County, New York
- National Register of Historic Places listings in northern Westchester County, New York
