= Peekskill Presbyterian Church =

Historic church in New York, United States

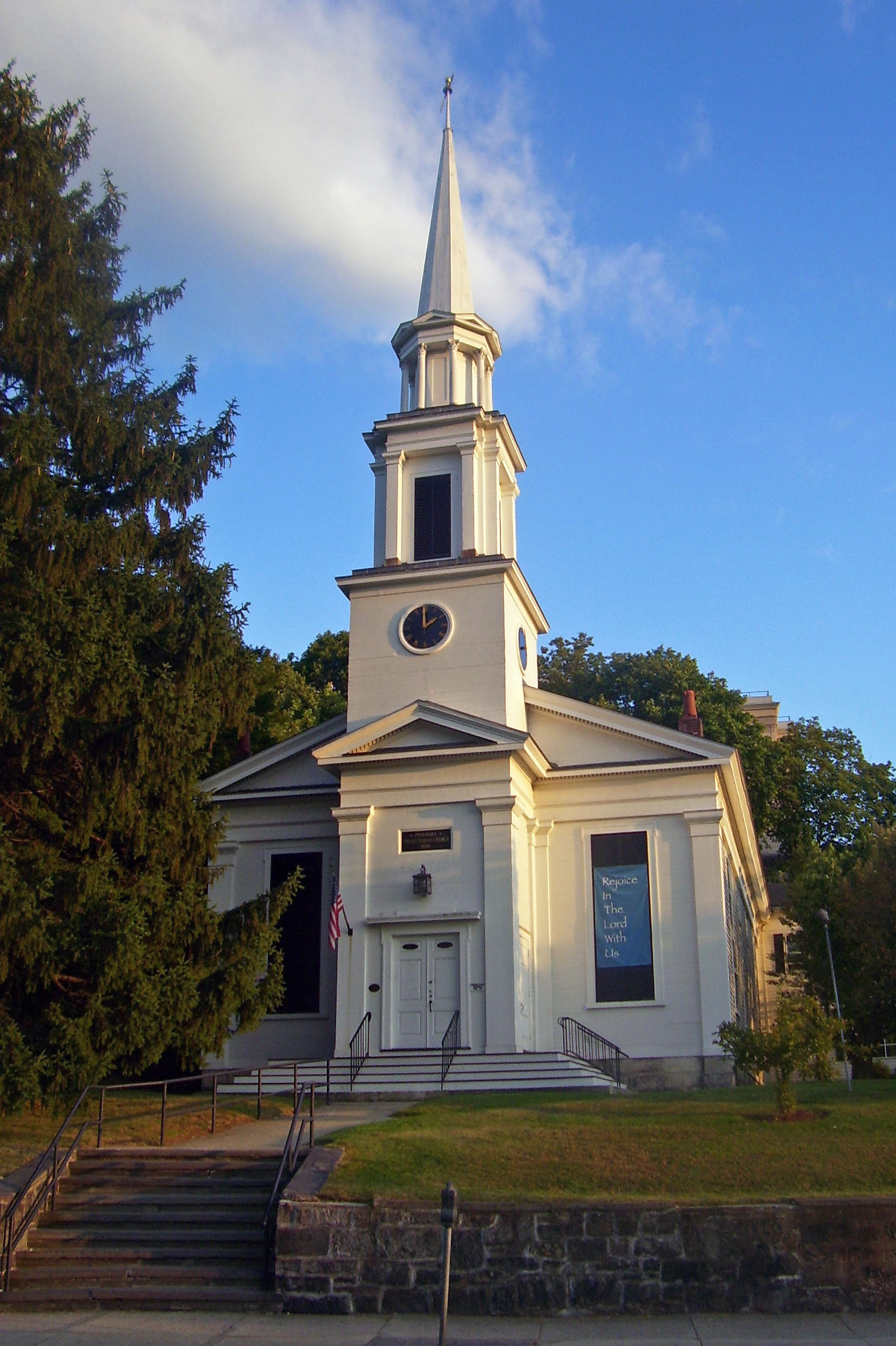
- South elevation, 2008

Religion
- Affiliation: Presbyterian
- Leadership: Board of deacons, session of elders

Location
- Location: Peekskill, New York, US
- Interactive map of Peekskill Presbyterian Church
- Coordinates: 41°17′19″N 73°55′27″W

Architecture
- Type: Church
- Style: Greek Revival
- Groundbreaking: 1846
- Completed: 1846

Specifications
- Length: 85 feet (26 m)
- Width: 40 feet (12 m)
- Materials: wood

U.S. National Register of Historic Places
- Added to NRHP: December 4, 2002
- NRHP Reference no.: 02001400

Website
- www.peekskillpresby.org

The Peekskill Presbyterian Church is a historic Greek Revival-style church located in Peekskill, New York, United States. It was built in 1846 and was twice the size of the original sanctuary which the congregation, dating to 1799 but formally incorporated in 1826, had outgrown.

It has been renovated and expanded over the years, but retains much of its original design. The church's bell is the original bell used in the late 18th century. In 2002 it was listed on the National Register of Historic Places, along with some of the other buildings on the property.

== Property ==
The church sits on a trapezoidal 1.2-acre (4,900 m^{2}) lot at the southeast corner of South and Washington streets west of downtown Peekskill. The ground rises considerably from street level, and there is a four-foot (1.1 m) retaining wall along the front of the property. Behind it, atop the hill, is the former Drum Hill High School, and slightly across the street is the post office, both also listed on the National Register. The high ground and open space across South Street afford the church a sweeping view of the Hudson River and the southern mountains of the Hudson Highlands.

Set back somewhat from South Street, the church is a one-story three-by-four-bay building on a stone foundation sided in white clapboard. The pedimented gable roof is supported by four corner Doric pilasters and a full entablature. The front has a centrally placed engaged four-stage bell tower with electric clock. There are four large 36-over-36 double-hung sash windows on either side and two flanking the main entrance. All have eared wood surrounds

The tower's first stage is the front entrance, with Doric pilasters and a triangular pediment. Second is the clock stage, and the third stage, with the bell, has the most elaborate classical ornamentation on the church: eight freestanding Corinthian columns with a triangular pediment spanning each pair. The last stage is an octagonal spire with weathervane.

On the rear is a one-and-a-half-story addition making the building T-shaped. It has a two-story extension of its own on its west of modern construction.

The front door has a denticulated lintel and eared surrounds. Its three sets of doors lead into a vestibule, where staircases lead up to the balcony level and more doors lead into the sanctuary. That room has a high flat ceiling and original wainscoting to the bottom of the windows, which have their original eared surrounds and louvered interior shutters.

In addition to the church there is another building, the Fowler House, and a cemetery on the property. The house, used as church offices, is a two-and-a-half-story clapboard building with a five-bay symmetrical facade and a Victorian projecting gable above the main entrance. The 32-by-45-foot (9.8 by 13.7 m) cemetery is enclosed by an iron fence and contains a small collection of gravestones, the most recent dating to the late 19th century. Both it and the Fowler House are considered contributing resources to the National Register listing.

== History ==
The church began informally meeting in 1799 in a smaller (40 by 30 feet (12.2 by 9.1 m)) building on the same site. The bell, made by an Albany company called Aspenwald, was hung in it shortly after it opened, and probably was tolled to mark the death of George Washington shortly after its installation. In 1826, the church was formally organized by 16 congregants, 14 of whom were women (the Peekskill church was one of the first to elect women as elders), under the Rev. Elisha Baldwin of the Presbytery of New York.

By the 1840s the church was hosting 100 people, more than three times its actual membership, at Sunday services. Among the regular attendees was a boy named Chauncey Depew, who later became president of the New York Central Railroad and a U.S. Senator. Nine members split to establish what became the Second Presbyterian Church in 1841, possibly due to dissatisfaction with the extremely traditional and doctrinarian "Old School" pastor at that time.

This did not help ease crowding at the original church, and so in 1846 the old building was replaced with the nucleus of the present structure. The unknown architect put Greek Revival detailing on what was, in form, a very traditional church similar to what would have been built two decades earlier. The clock was paid for by public subscription and for most of the mid-19th century was the main public timepiece for what was then a village, so much so that the Board of Trustees set its meeting times by it.

In 1858 the rear extension, with a small chapel and lecture room, was added. It primarily served as the church's Sunday school. Growth continued as Peekskill's industrial economy prospered, and in 1869 the reunification of Old School and New School Presbyterianism brought the Second Presbyterian Church back under the same presbytery.

The church demolished the lecture hall (its foundation is still present) and rebuilt an expanded version in 1884. Eight years later, in 1892, the sanctuary was modified with the gallery reseated and lowered and the organ added to the southeast corner. Most of the finishings in the sanctuary, including the pews, date to this time. The Fowler House was deeded to the church in 1911.

Merger talks between the two Presbyterian churches finally succeeded in 1920, and the sale of the former Second Church property raised enough money for a new organ, redecoration of the auditorium and relocation of the choir loft, with Doric and Corinthian columns similar to those on the exterior included. This brought the sanctuary to its present configuration.

The church was able to sustain the use of these facilities for several decades. In 1964, more space was needed, and the Christian Education Building was added onto the south wing in 1964. A memorial fund allowed for the replacement of the original clock, which had long stopped working, with an electric one in 1968. A new organ was installed in 1971.

== The church today ==
The Presbyterian church has become much more active in community life in the late 20th century than it was before. It joined with other congregations to create the Inter-Faith Housing Corp., which helped create Stuhr Gardens, an affordable housing development in 1970. It operates a thrift shop and hosts local Boy Scout and Girl Scout meetings. In the wake of the September 11, 2001, terrorist attacks, its bell that had rung for Washington's death was rung in memory of the victims.

== See also ==
- National Register of Historic Places listings in Westchester County, New York
