= St. Peter's Episcopal Church (Peekskill, New York) =

Historic church in New York, United States

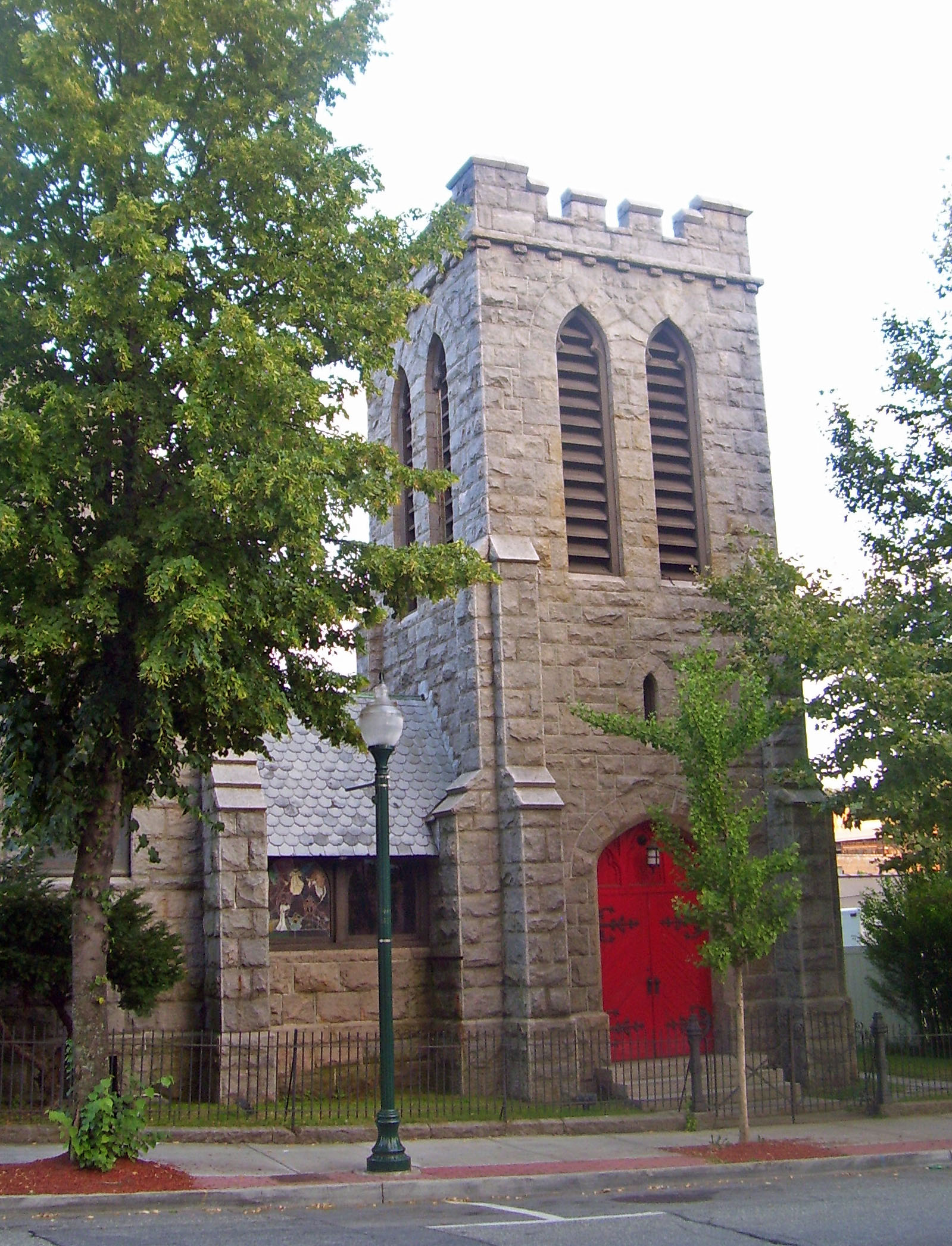
- Church tower from west, 2008

Religion
- Affiliation: Episcopal Church in the United States of America

Location
- Location: Peekskill, NY USA
- Interactive map of St. Peter's Episcopal Church
- Coordinates: 41°17′32″N 73°55′9″W

Architecture
- Architect: Richard M. Upjohn
- Type: Church
- Style: Neo-Gothic Revival
- Completed: 1892

Specifications
- Direction of façade: west
- Spire height: 60 feet (18 m)
- Materials: Stone, slate

Website
- St. Peter's Church

St. Peter's Episcopal Church of Peekskill, New York, United States, is located on the north edge of the city's downtown. It is a three-building complex of stone Late Gothic Revival buildings on a half-acre (2,000 m²) dating to the late 19th century and added onto at successive later dates.

The church reported 183 members in 2015 and 110 members in 2025. Plate and pledge income for the congregation in 2025 was $94,184 with average Sunday attendance (ASA) of 39.

The church itself was established in nearby Van Cortlandtville before the American Revolution as Old St. Peter's Church. Its current home is the third building on the site, designed by architect Richard M. Upjohn in an architectural style recalling the churches styled after English country parish churches his father had designed early in his career. In 2003 it was listed on the National Register of Historic Places.

== Property ==
The church property is located at the southeast corner of the intersection of Howard and North Division streets, just outside the boundary of the Peekskill Downtown Historic District. Pugsley Park is to the east. The land slopes gently upward to the north.

=== Church ===
There are three buildings on the property: the church hall with lychgate, church house and parish house. All are considered contributing to its historic character and the National Register listing.

The church's nave is a one-story rectangular structure of coursed granite. It has a gabled roof with slate shingles and a parapeted west gable. Two shed-roofed additions run the length of the north and south profiles. The lychgate and bell tower, both of which open to North Division Street and were added later, are to the north and south respectively.

The lychgate has a wooden gabled top. The 16-foot (4.8 m) square tower is faced in similar stone to the nave, and has Gothic louvered vents below its crenelated roofline and stepped buttresses at the corners from the bottom of the vent to ground level. Double doors on the west side open to steps down to the street.

Inside, the nave follows a traditional linear plan with a central aisle between wooden pews. Wainscoting rises to the ceiling and its exposed trusses, all darkened by finishings. The chancel has a tiled floor and vaulted ceiling finished with wainscoting. It has a marble altar and reredos. There are 12 triple-lancet stained glass windows on the walls, and a rose window behind the altar.

=== Outbuildings ===
Howard House, the former parsonage, is located on the northwest corner of the lot. It is a two-story, three-bay Greek Revival house sided in brick laid in Flemish bond trimmed in cast iron. An Italianate addition to the north has a two-story bay window with intermediate cornice. There is also a one-story brick wing on the rear.

The front of the main block has frieze-band vents at the roofline below a bracketed cornice. The main entrance has a classically-inspired surround with transom light. Inside it retains much of the original plaster finishing and decoration, including eared door and window surrounds.

Behind it along Howard Street, at the northeast corner of the property, is the Frost Memorial Parish House, a two-story Tudorbethan five-bay–long hall with stucco walls and half-timbers. Its roof, gabled with a half-hip at the south and gable-on-hip at the north (front) end, is shingled in slate. A similar flat-roofed one-and-a-half–story addition projects from the south. The main entrance at the north end is a two-story symmetrical projecting bay with raised parapet.

Its first floor interior is an open meeting space with linoleum tile flooring, plaster walls and imitation exposed ceiling timbers. The second story is divided between church offices and day-care classrooms.

== History ==
St. Peter's was founded during the Colonial era, and its first church was consecrated in 1767 and remains in use today. In 1838 Ward Howard, a resident of what was then the village of Peekskill, offered the church land behind the house he had built a few years earlier. A wooden Gothic Revival church was built on the site.

In 1882 the church acquired Howard's house and converted it into a parsonage. Seven years later, in 1889, the congregation voted to replace the church on the land he had donated to it. They chose a design by Richard M. Upjohn, son of Richard Upjohn, an English immigrant who had designed many notable churches and houses. The younger Upjohn's design recalled the simple Gothic English country parish churches that Upjohn and other architects of the mid-century had advocated and built for Episcopal congregations in the Northeast and elsewhere, under the influence of Ecclesiogical movement in church architecture Unlike other neo-Gothic government and institutional buildings of the late Victorian era, decoration is minimal.

The tower, possibly an unbuilt element of Upjohn's original design, was added in 1905, after his death. In the 1910s, the wing was added to the rear of the Howard House. The parish house was built in 1913. Hobart Upjohn, Richard's son, designed the interior renovations that were made in 1926. The reredos, painted by a local Episcopalian nun, was added in 1934. The last alteration to the buildings was the wing added to the parish house in 1964. It is architecturally sympathetic, but due to its recent construction is not considered to contributing.

== See also ==
- National Register of Historic Places listings in Westchester County, New York
