= Church of the Covenant (Boston) =

Historic church in Massachusetts, United States

- Central Congregational Church
- U.S. National Register of Historic Places
- U.S. National Historic Landmark
- U.S. Historic district – Contributing property
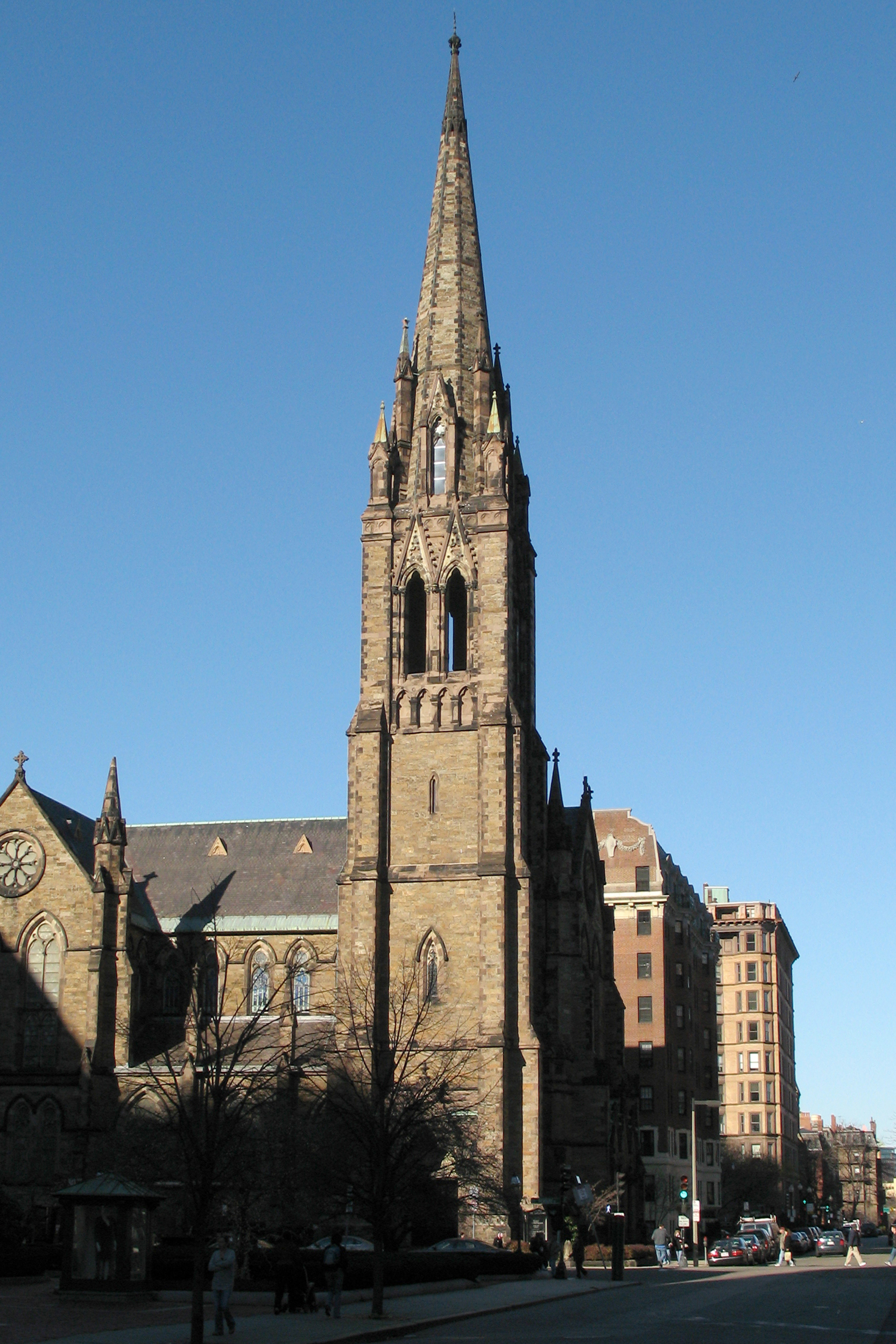
- Location: 67 Newbury Street, Boston, MA
- Coordinates: 42°21′07.00″N 71°4′26.00″W
- Built: 1867
- Part of: Back Bay Historic District (ID73001948)
- NRHP reference No.: 12001012

Significant dates
- Added to NRHP: October 17, 2012
- Designated NHL: October 17, 2012
- Designated CP: August 14, 1973

The Church of the Covenant is a historic church at 67 Newbury Street in the Back Bay neighborhood of Boston, Massachusetts. A National Historic Landmark, it was built in 1865–1867 by the Central Congregational Church, and is now affiliated with the Presbyterian Church and the United Church of Christ. The church was designed by Richard M. Upjohn, and its distinctive interior is largely the work of Tiffany & Co. For almost half a century it was the tallest building in Boston, from its completion in 1867 until the building of the Custom House Tower in 1915.

== History ==
Built of Roxbury puddingstone in Gothic Revival style it was one of the first churches to relocate in the new Back Bay and was built largely with funds donated by Benjamin Bates, an industrialist who founded Bates College. Designed by Richard M. Upjohn, the son and partner of Richard Upjohn, who insisted on "a high gothic edifice ... which no ordinary dwelling house would overtop." It has a 240-foot (73 m) high steeple, that overtops the Bunker Hill Monument. Oliver Wendell Holmes said: "We have one steeple in Boston that to my eyes seems absolutely perfect — that of the Central Church on the corner of Newbury and Berkeley Streets." In the 1890s the sanctuary was redecorated by Tiffany Glass and Decorating Co. with stained-glass windows and mosaics and an electric-light chandelier designed by Tiffany's Jacob Adolphus Holzer for the World's Columbian Exhibition, Chicago, 1893.

The Church of the Covenant is located at 67 Newbury Street. It was known as the "Central Church" until 1932 when the Central Congregational Church merged with the First Presbyterian Church of Boston creating the Church of the Covenant, which is now affiliated with the Presbyterian Church and the United Church of Christ.

In 1966, the Back Bay historic district was established, protecting any building within its boundaries from exterior changes, including this church building. In October 2012 the church building was designated a National Historic Landmark (as "Central Congregational Church") in recognition of its unique interior decorations.

In 1999 The Church of the Covenant was a filming location for the movie The Boondock Saints. Given the nature of the script, there were problems finding a church liberal enough to permit filming inside. The company finally got permission from the Church of the Covenant.

== Gallery of interior views ==
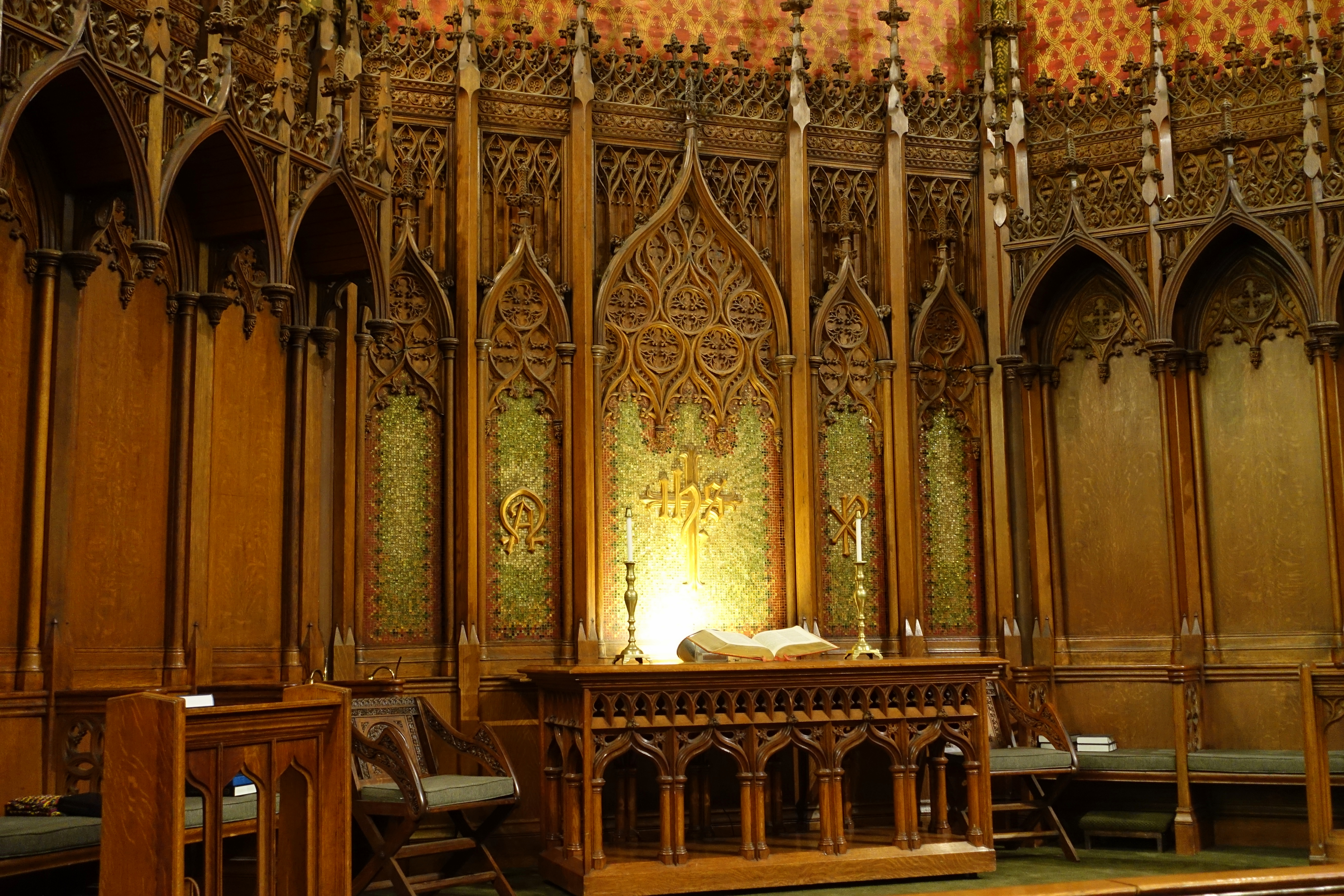
Altar

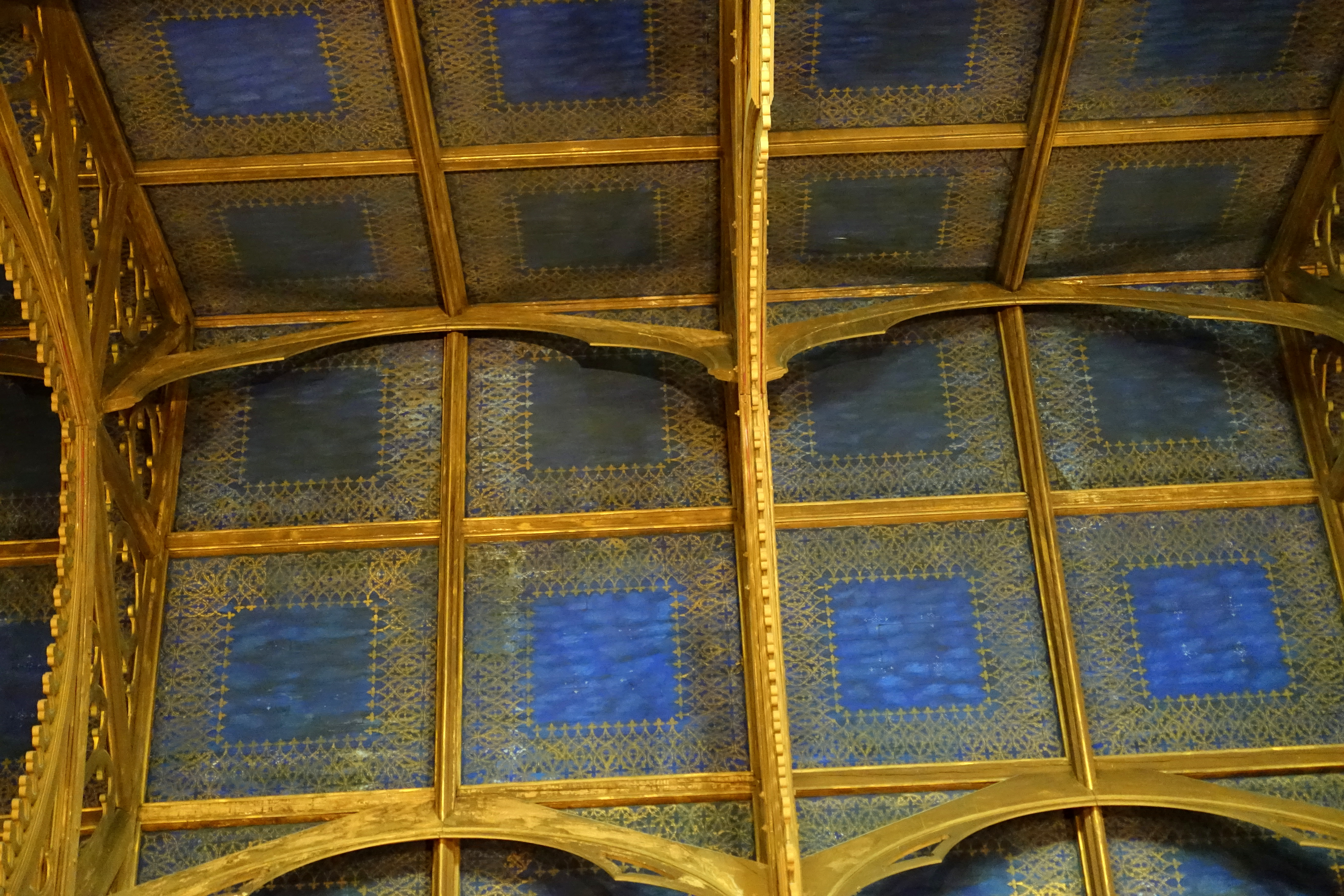
Ceiling detail

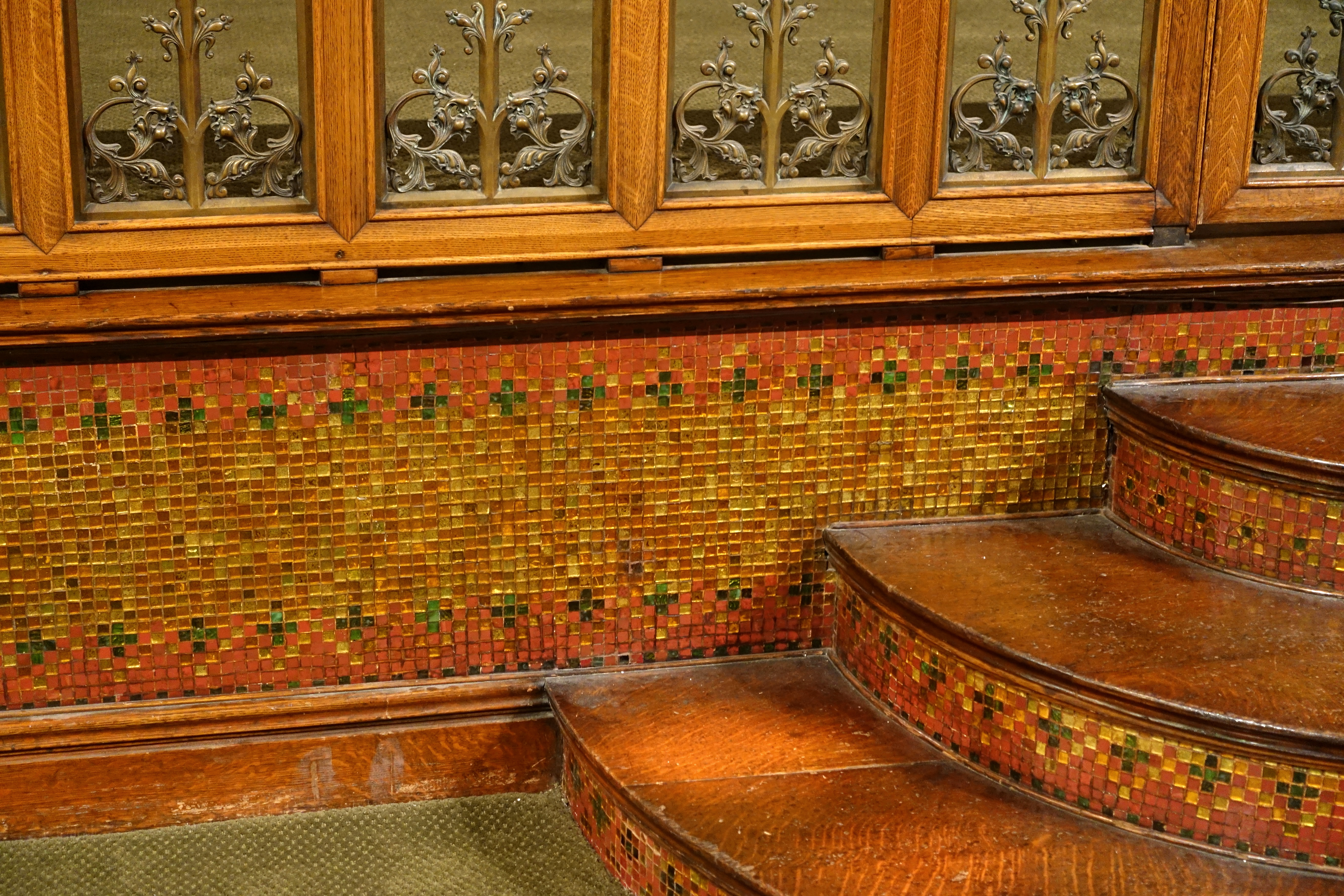
Tile detail

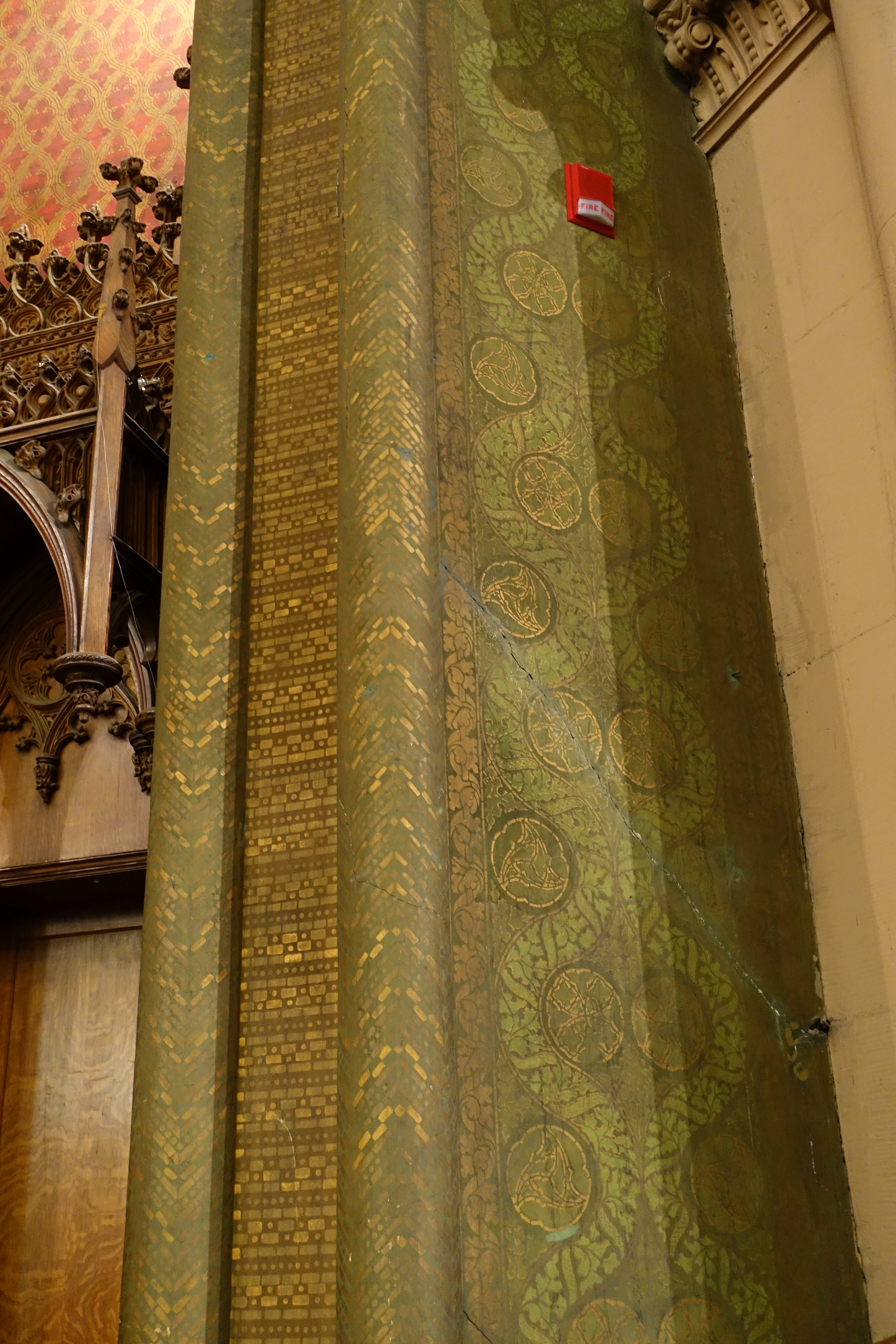
Stencilwork

== See also ==
- Arlington Street Church – nearby Boston church with 16 Tiffany stained-glass windows
- List of National Historic Landmarks in Massachusetts
- National Register of Historic Places listings in northern Boston, Massachusetts

== Notes ==
Preceded by Park Street Church	Tallest Building in Boston; 1867–1915; 72 m	Succeeded by Custom House Tower
