= St. Mark's Episcopal Church (Augusta, Maine) =

Historic church in Maine, United States

- U.S. National Register of Historic Places
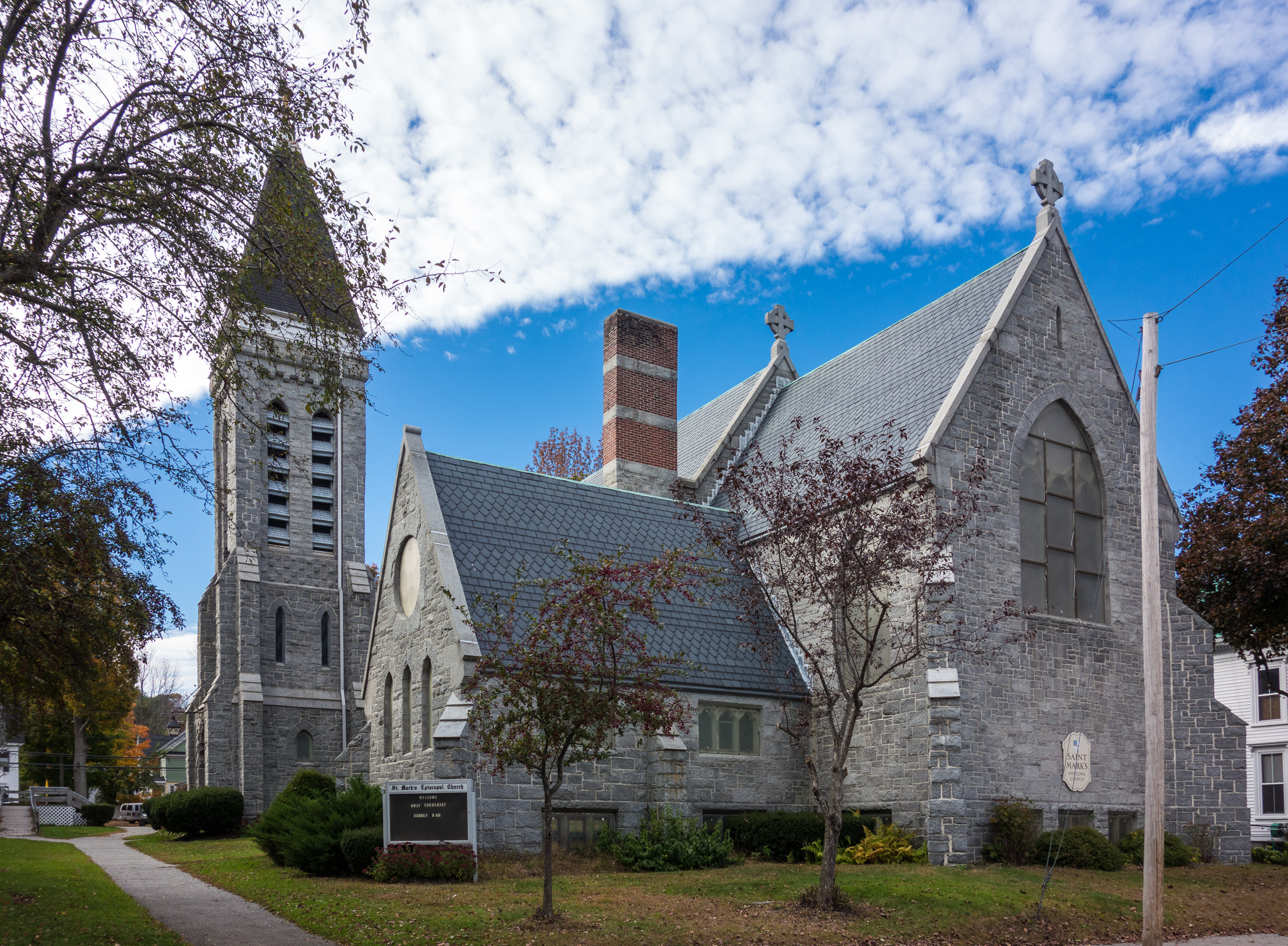
- The church in 2013

- Location within Maine Location within the United States
- Location: 9 Summer St., Augusta, Maine
- Coordinates: 44°18′59″N 69°46′43″W
- Area: 0.5 acres (0.20 ha)
- Built: 1886
- Architect: Richard M. Upjohn
- Architectural style: Gothic
- NRHP reference No.: 84001379
- Added to NRHP: July 19, 1984

St. Mark's Episcopal Church was a historic church at 9 Summer Street in Augusta, Maine, just west of downtown. The congregation, founded in 1840, occupied an 1886 Gothic Revival stone building designed by Richard M. Upjohn and listed on the National Register of Historic Places in 1984 for its architecture. The congregation moved out in 2015.

== History ==
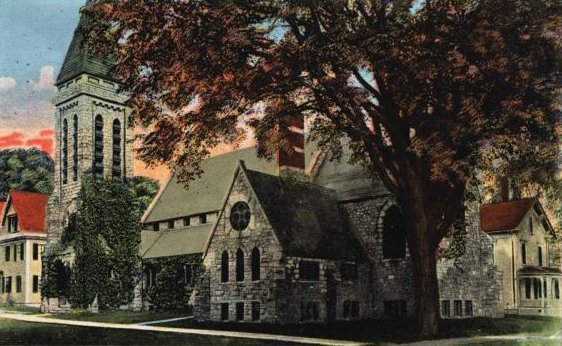
Postcard view of the church, c. 1900

The congregation was established in 1840, and first occupied a small wooden church that located just north of the current site of the Lithgow Library. The present building was built for the congregation in 1886 to a design by architect Richard M. Upjohn. A window honoring Saint Mark from the old church is part of the current church and stands behind the choir stalls. The congregation housed multiple community ministries including Addie's Attic Clothing Bank, Everyday Basics Essentials Pantry and the Augusta Area Food Bank, all of which operate in the adjacent Parish Hall, which was built in 1959.

In 2015 the congregation began worshiping at Prince of Peace Lutheran Church (now called Emmanuel Lutheran Episcopal Church) at 209 Eastern Ave. The ecumenical congregation reported 63 members in 2021 and 71 members in 2020; no membership statistics were reported in 2024 parochial reports. Plate and pledge income reported for the congregation in 2024 was $127,421. Average Sunday attendance (ASA) in 2024 was 33 persons.

The church property was offered for sale in 2016.

== Activities ==
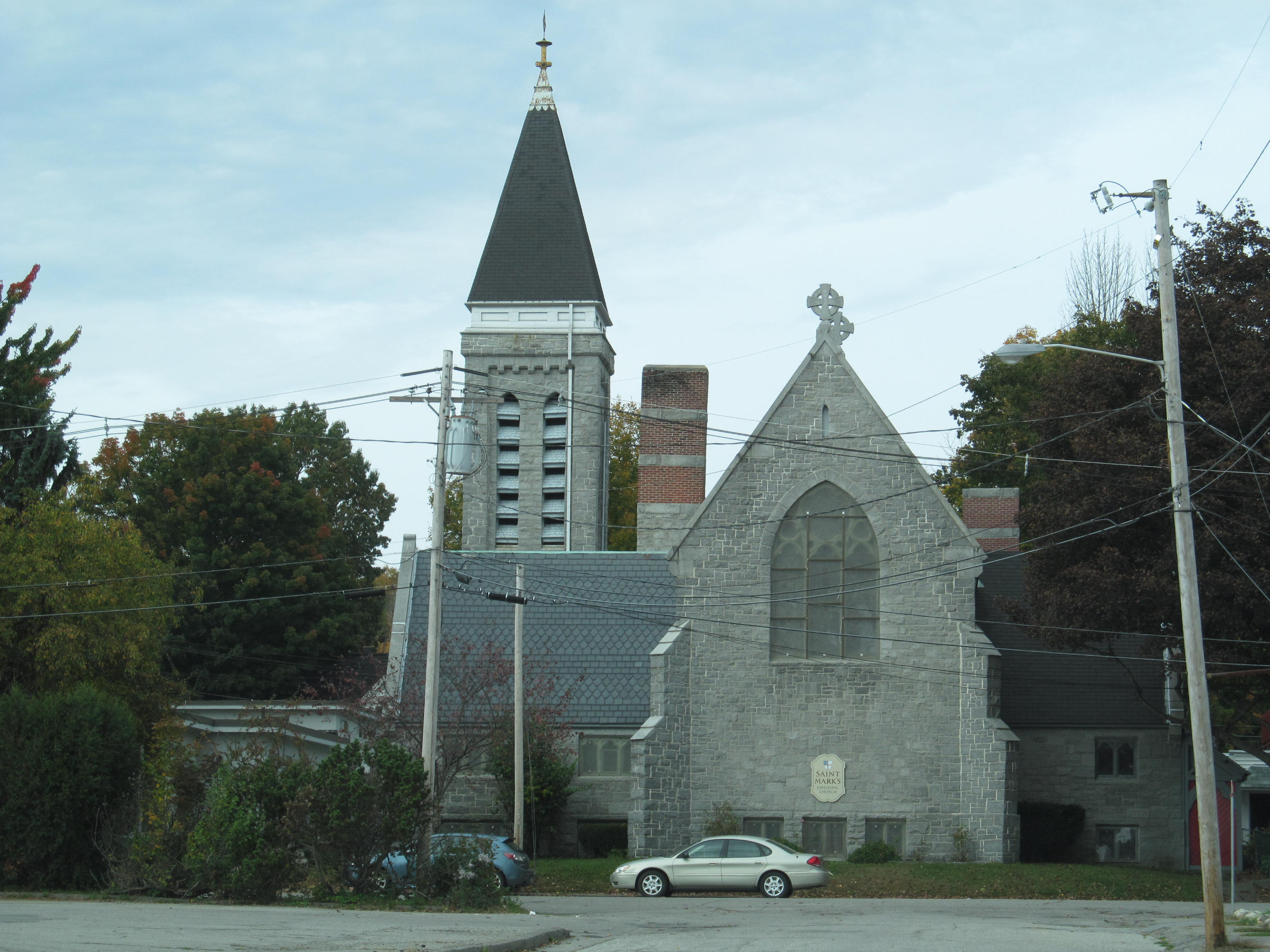
The church in 2012

Outside of church services, Saint Mark's Church also served as a venue for musical performances. Most prominent among these was an organ concert held every spring since 1997. In 2010, the annual concert was renamed the Annual Marilyn Tedesco Memorial Concert in honor of former St. Mark's Music Director and organist Marilyn Tedesco.

== Architecture ==
The church occupies a lot between Summer and Pleasant Streets a short way west of downtown Augusta. It is built out of quarry-faced granite, with a gable-roofed main section oriented east-west and two south-facing gabled projections. The western of the two projections has a tall square tower, with buttressed corners, belfry, and pyramidal roof topped by a cross. Windows are either lancet-arched in the Gothic style, or rectangular, and are decorated with tracery. The interior includes marble columns and detailed high-quality woodwork. The chancel ceiling has original stencil decorations.

== See also ==
- National Register of Historic Places listings in Kennebec County, Maine
