= St. Peter's Episcopal Church (Albany, New York) =

Historic church in New York, United States

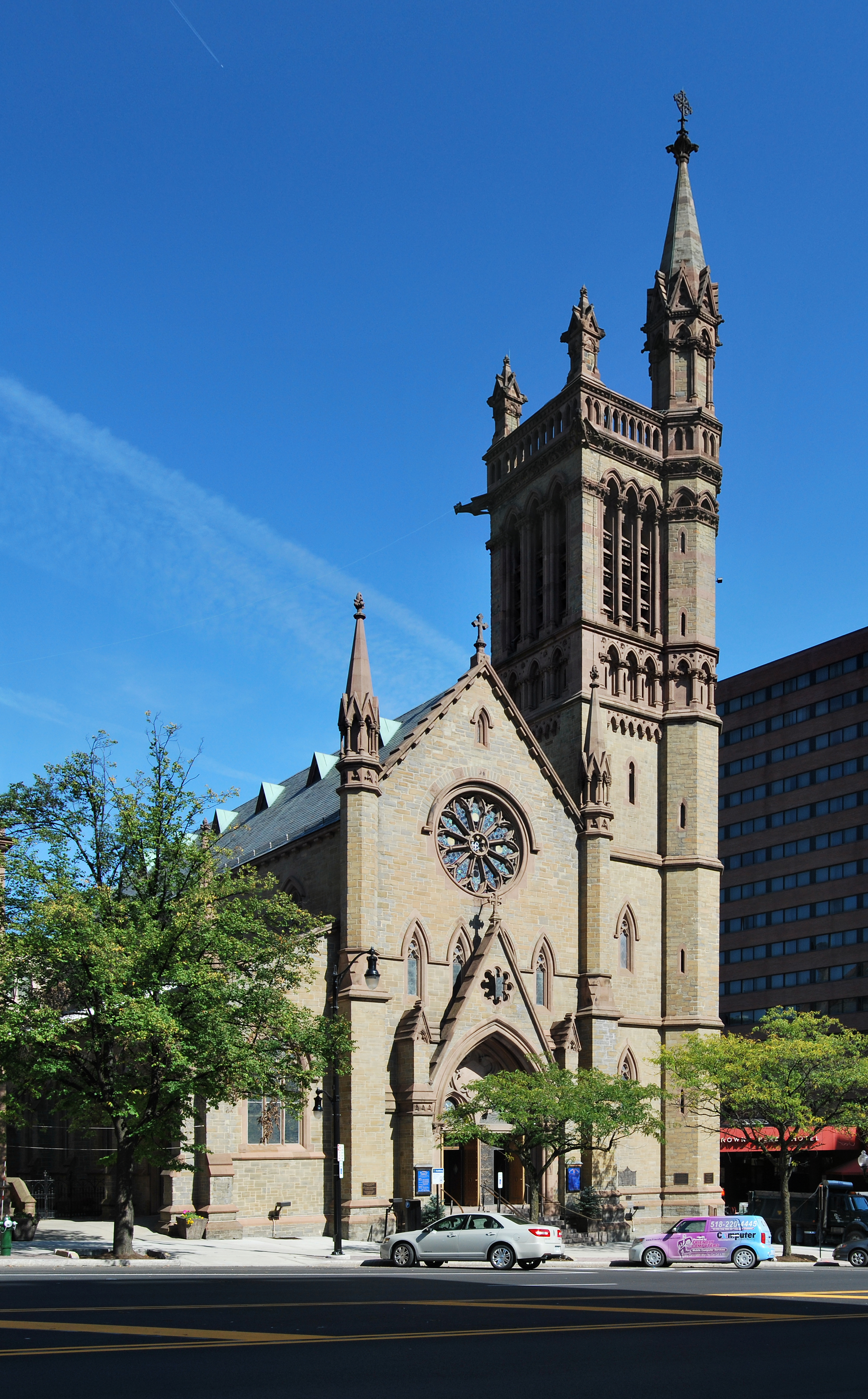
- South (front) elevation, 2011

Religion
- Affiliation: Episcopal Church
- Leadership: Mtr. Christina Hunter, Rector

Location
- Location: 105 State Street; Albany, New York
- Interactive map of St. Peter's Episcopal Church
- Coordinates: 42°39′3″N 73°45′14″W

Architecture
- Architects: Richard Upjohn and Richard M. Upjohn
- Type: Church
- Style: French Gothic Revival
- Founder: The Rev. Thomas Barclay
- Groundbreaking: 1859
- Completed: 1876
- Construction cost: $61,532.07

Specifications
- Direction of façade: South
- Length: 136 feet (41 m)
- Width: 68 feet (21 m)
- Height (max): 64 feet (20 m)
- Spire: 2
- Spire height: 180 feet (55 m)
- Materials: Stone

U.S. National Historic Landmark
- Added to NRHP: March 16, 1972
- NRHP Reference no.: 72000817
- Designated as NHL: January 16, 1980

Website
- St. Peter's Protestant Episcopal Church

St. Peter's Episcopal Church, also known as St. Peter's Church, is located in downtown Albany, New York, United States. It was designed in the mid-19th century by Richard Upjohn and his son Richard M. Upjohn in the French Gothic Revival architectural style. It was listed on the National Register of Historic Places in 1972, and designated a National Historic Landmark eight years later. It is also a contributing property to the Downtown Albany Historic District.

The church reported 435 members in 2019 and 250 members in 2023; no membership statistics were reported in 2024 parochial reports. Plate and pledge income reported for the congregation in 2024 was $214,040. Average Sunday attendance (ASA) in 2024 was 86 persons.

The church was established at the behest of Queen Anne in 1715. The church still has a silver communion service set given to it by her. It was the first Anglican congregation north of New York City and west of the Hudson River.

A building was erected shortly after the church was established, housing it for the rest of the 18th century. In 1758, George Howe, 3rd Viscount Howe, was buried here after his death leading an attempt to recapture Fort Ticonderoga during the French and Indian War. His grave remains in the current church, making him the only British peer buried in the United States.

The original building was replaced in 1803. That building yielded to the current structure almost 60 years later, with the tower making it complete in 1876. It is often considered one of the elder Upjohn's best-known works, although his son was largely responsible for designing the tower, its most distinctive feature. The interior includes some original Clayton & Bell stained glass windows and sculpture by Louis Saint-Gaudens.

== Building ==
St. Peter's is located on the northwest corner of the intersection of State (New York State Route 5) and Lodge streets. It is near the western boundary of the Downtown Albany Historic District, to which it is also a contributing property. The terrain slopes up toward the west, rising from the flood plain of the Hudson River a quarter-mile (500 m) to the east towards the higher ground on which much of Albany's more modern development has taken place.

The surrounding neighborhood is a densely developed urban core, with other historic buildings nearby. To the east, across Lodge Street, is a modern building with a parking garage attached to its north end. North of it, across Pine Street, is the 1867 Italian Renaissance Revival St. Mary's Church, the home of Albany's oldest Roman Catholic congregation, and like St. Peter's listed on the National Register both as a contributing property and individually.

North of the church are two older buildings, one housing some city government offices. Northwest of the church are the small Corning Park and Albany's city hall, outside the historic district but on the Register as well. West of the church along the north side of State are the Guild House, its parish hall, and smaller, older commercial buildings. A block further is Lafayette Park and New York's state capitol, a National Historic Landmark like St. Peter's.

Facing the building on the south side is a vacant lot and some more older commercial buildings, one of which houses the local extension of the Cornell University School of Industrial and Labor Relations. Opposite the church at the southeast corner of State and Lodge are the offices of Albany County's information-technology department and the state comptroller. More parking garages separate them and the large Times Union Center arena to their south.

=== Exterior ===
The church itself has walls of Schenectady bluestone with trim of New Jersey sandstone. Shed-roofed additions are on either side of the main block. A 20-foot (6.1 m) square tower rises from the southeast corner, with a narrow 180-foot (55 m) octagonal tower on its own southeast carrying a spiral staircase. In the rear is a small octagonal chancel.

Decoration on the facades is French Gothic in character. A small projecting main entrance portico has a gabled top with a rosette in the apex topped by a cross. It is flanked by two small miniature versions set on stone pillars. At the corners octagonal stone spires rise, with round smooth columns supporting gables that rise to a conical roof with a folial finial.

At the second story, set off by a large water table, are four narrow lancet arched windows, with a rosette in their transoms. A molded stone course connects their springlines. Above them is a large rosette window with a small lancet-arched window in the gable apex.

At the roofline is a modillioned cornice. The area behind it on the roof is trimmed in copper; the rest of the roof shingled in slate. It is pierced by five gabled dormer windows on either side, also topped in copper.

==== Bell tower ====
In the lower three of the tower's five stages is a single narrow lancet-arched window. The shorter fourth stage has three small windows recessed behind an intricate set of smooth round columns and Gothic arches. Above them the fifth stage has corresponding narrowed 9-foot-tall (3 m) louvered vents in a similar treatment.

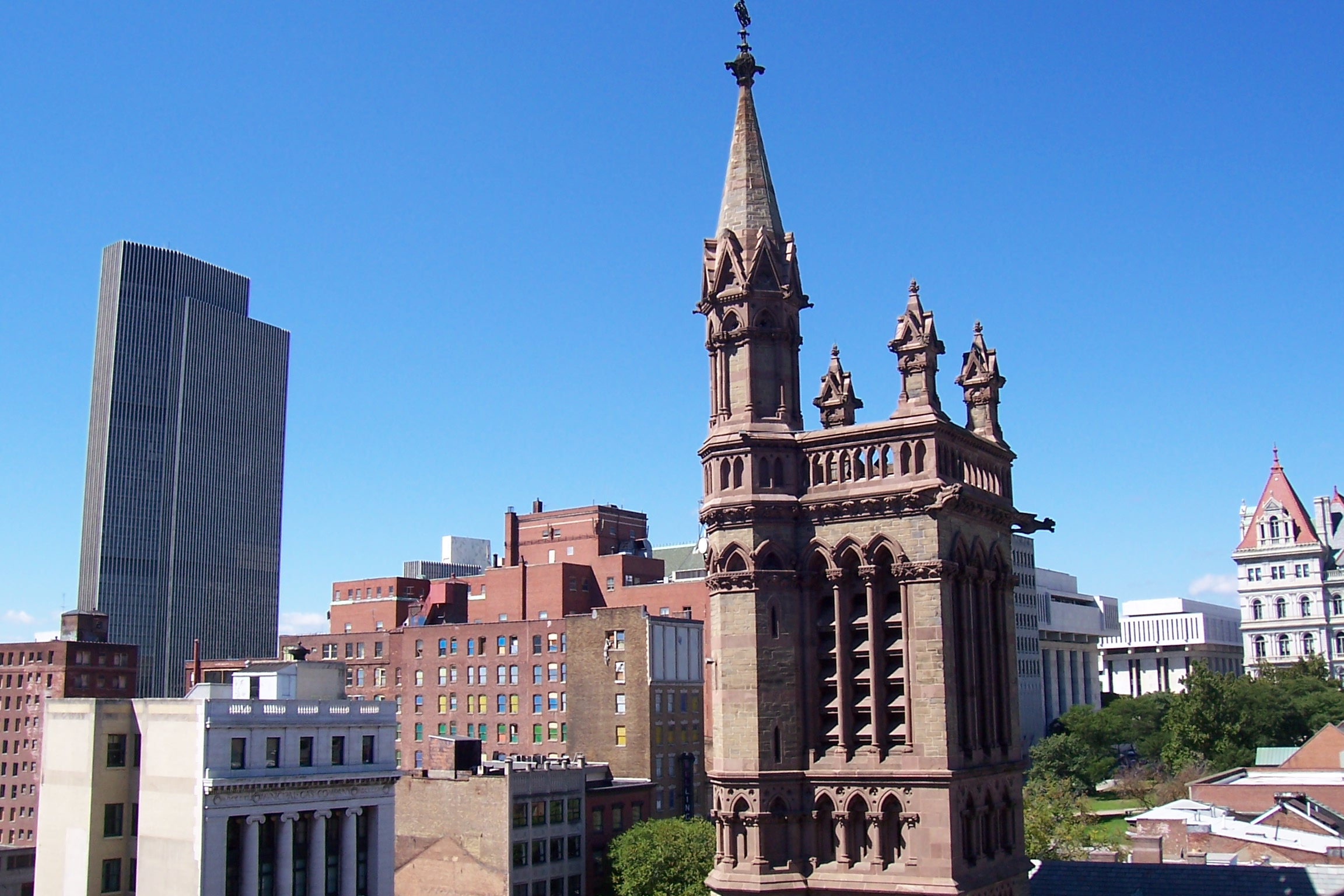
Closeup of belfry, with Erastus Corning Tower at left and state capitol at right

The belfry, with six tons (5.4 tonnes) of bells inside, is 30 feet (10 m) tall. The three lancet windows on its faces are divided by molded shafts and topped by arches supported by sculpted heads. Above a decorative foliated frieze is the 8-foot (2.4 m) parapet, with arched openings, surrounding the roof. Three gargoyles, each weighing 3 tons (2.7 tonnes) and projecting out eight feet, project from the three corners. The corners are further topped with square turrets with a miniature version of the upper tower treatment.

The octagonal southeast spire has a similar window treatment to the upper stages of the tower. At the top it has a gabled hood above it. The conical roof ends in a double Dutch cross 60 feet (18 m) above the rest of the tower.

=== Interior ===
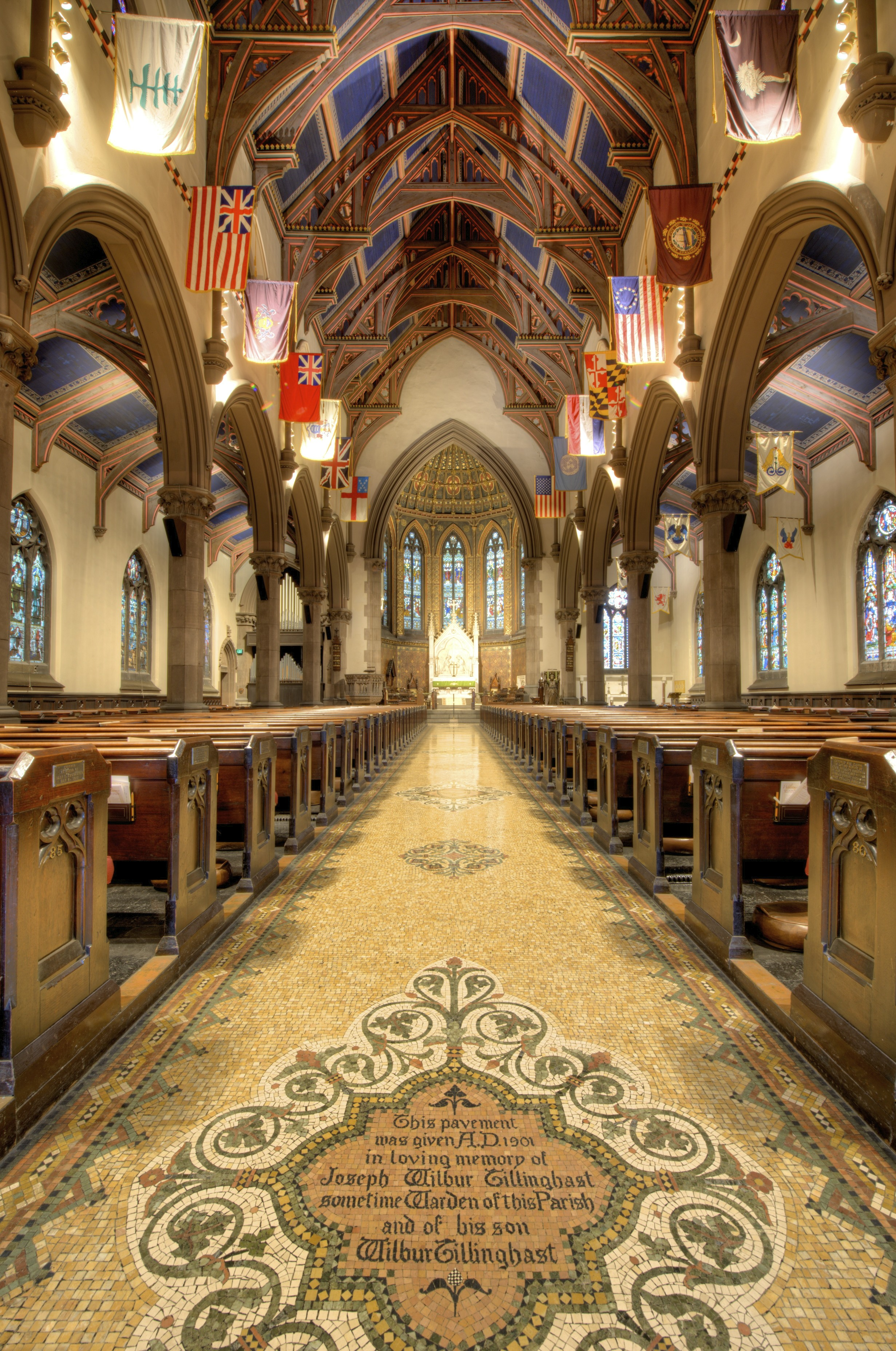
Center aisle mosaic, designed by Jacob Adolphus Holzer

The church's interior is finished in black walnut. The columbarium is in the base of the bell tower off the main entrance. It has a mosaic floor decorated by Jacob Adolphus Holzer in various religious motifs. Its aisles are on either side of the nave, which is decorated with the flags of the Episcopal Church and a variety of state and national ensigns representing the church and the city's history. St. Mark's Chapel is off to one side for smaller services and ceremonies.

Along the walls of the apse are six stained glass windows. Each depicts two angels in the transom and a scene from the life of St. Peter below. There are smaller windows in the aisles.

In the chancel a brass rail separates the choir from the rest of the sanctuary. The altar is of Caen stone, raised seven steps above the floor. The front features recessed round arches and tinted marble columns. Behind the stone reredos depicts two angels in front of a cross, sculpted in relief, praying over the retable. Above them another cross tops the reredos.

A credence table, also of Caen stone, with a recessed arch enclosed in a square and sculptured corbels on its exterior molding, is on the south wall. Across the chancel the pulpit rises from the crypt, made of red Carlisle sandstone in the Venetian Gothic style. In the middle the lectern takes the form of an angel standing on a globe.

== History ==
St. Peter's has had three buildings throughout its history.

=== 1701–1803: First church ===
After taking Albany from its Dutch founders in 1664, the British assumed the military responsibility of protecting it against a possible French incursion from the north via the newly renamed Fort Frederick, which sat just above the stockaded settlement. But for the rest of the 17th century they otherwise left no imprint on the city's cultural life. Residents still largely spoke Dutch and attended the Dutch Reformed Church.

In 1701 the Church of England established the Society for the Propagation of the Gospel in Foreign Parts to promote its growth in the colonies. One of its missionaries, The Rev. Thomas Barclay, came to Albany three years afterwards. Although the city's Dutch establishment was somewhat disturbed by this, his primary intended audience was the Iroquois tribes to the north and west of the city and the British garrison. He soon established the city's first Anglican parish.

By 1710, Barclay was reporting back to the Society that his efforts had been successful. "A great many Dutch children, who at my first arrival were altogether ignorant of the English tongue, can distinctly say our catechism, and make the responses at prayers," he wrote. However, the Iroquois were largely either resistant to converting or in the depths of alcoholism, so he warned that any other missionaries should be prepared for a difficult task.

Two years later, Queen Anne sent the parish a silver communion service set. Barclay began to seek out land for an actual church. In 1714 Governor Robert Hunter granted Barclay a license to begin collecting funds for the church, and personally gave all the stone and lime necessary. The citizens of Albany donated £200. Every soldier at the fort gave money, and all but one citizen of Schenectady contributed.

A site just below the fort, at Chapel and Yonkers (today's State) streets, was chosen, one block east of the current location. Construction was delayed when the city council objected to the royal grant of land that belonged to the city. The following year the council again stopped construction when it appeared that the building had encroached on neighboring public land. Barclay and others were arrested and released on bail; Hunter refused the council's request to revoke the building permit.

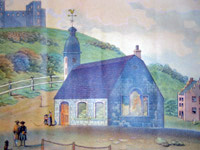
1717 church, depicted with steeple built in later 18th century

The small stone church with a gambrel roof was completed and opened in 1717. It was the first Anglican church in New York west of the Hudson River, and the first north of the city of New York. The first entries in its records were made the following year.

Barclay continued to serve as the church's rector until he became ill in the mid-1720s. A letter requesting an assistant for him also asked that such person speak clear English as "Mr. Barclay spoke so broad Scotch that it was difficult to understand him." John Milne was sent from England; he formally succeeded Barclay in 1728. Next year he reported that the church had at least 100 regular congregants, with more coming at Easter.

In 1731 the church was damaged by a fire; it was repaired in two weeks. It was one of several that led the city council to improve the city's firefighting capability over the next several years. Thomas Barclay's son Henry became rector in 1738.

Swedish botanist Peter Kalm visited Albany in 1749 during one of his travels in North America. He noted St. Peter's as one of the city's distinctive buildings, referring to it in his writings as the "English church." It was distinguished from the "Dutch church" by its lack of the steeple it has been depicted as having; a steeple was built two years later under the new rector, John Ogilvie.

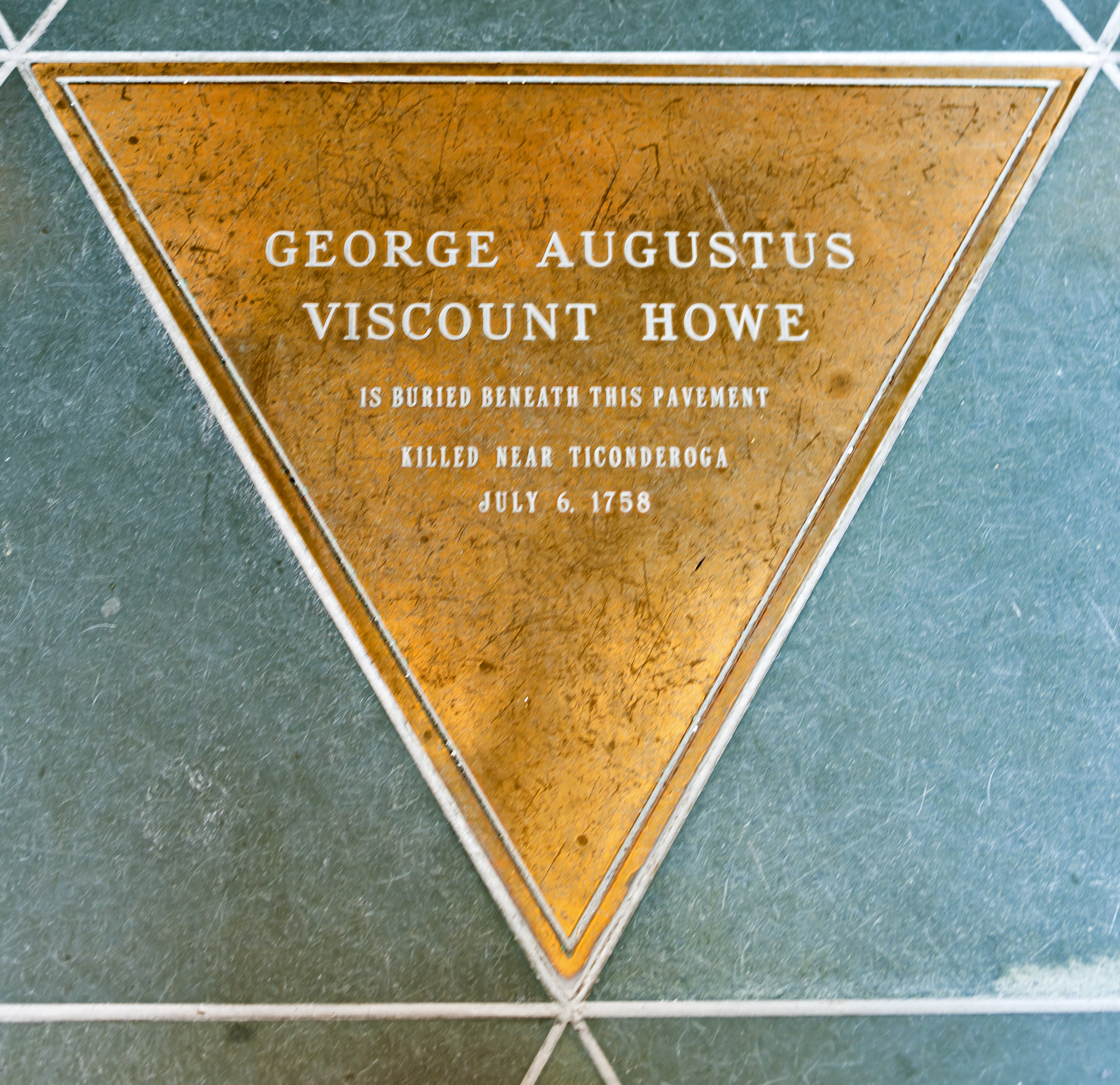
Howe's burial marker in the church vestibule floor

In the 1750s the city lived under threat of invasion as the French and Indian War, the North American theater of the Seven Years' War, broke out. When the French captured Fort Ticonderoga at the south end of Lake Champlain, refugees from the outlying areas began flocking to the city. During an attempt to retake the fort in 1758, Lord Howe, commander of the British forces, was killed in action. He died in the arms of Philip Schuyler, one of his junior officers and a close friend, who would later fight against his former comrades as a general in the Continental Army and serve as one of the state of New York's first U.S. senators. After Schuyler brought Howe's body back to his home in Watervliet, the general was buried at St. Peter's. He is interred in a vault under the steps of the current church, the only British peer buried in the United States.

The British victory at the Plains of Abraham outside Quebec City in 1759 turned the tide of the war. Four years later, the Treaty of Paris turned France's North American colonies over to the British. With no military threat remaining, the city's stockades were dismantled and it began to grow. St. Peter's applied for a charter from King George III; it was granted by Governor Henry Moore later that year and signed by the church leadership in 1769. After the Revolutionary War of the next decade led to American independence, the church was rechartered by the New York State Legislature.

Following that, in 1790, the church and the city made a land deal. The city got from the church the land it had been on, the royal grant of which had led to such fierce opposition at the beginning of the century, which the city now needed to expand and extend State Street. In return the church got the land where the present church and its predecessor were built, one block to the west, where the fort had long since been dismantled.

=== 1803–1859: Second church ===
After almost a century in its original home, the church had grown and was ready for a new building. Philip Hooker designed a stone Federal style building, facing south, with a tall steeple. It was started in 1802 and completed the following year, at a cost of $26,767 ($575,000 in modern dollars). The church had to sell the three lots to its west in order to raise the money. In 1822, it began seeking a builder for the steeple. Seven years later, it sold the remaining lots on the block to the city for construction of the first city hall and county government buildings.

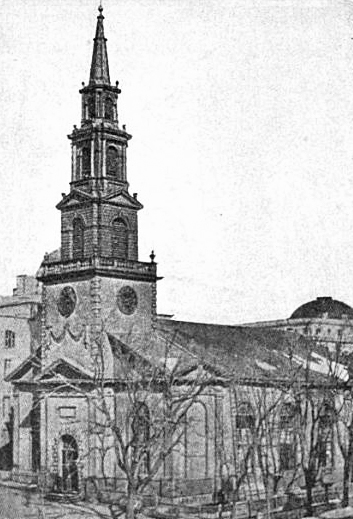
1803 church

For much of the second quarter of the 19th century, the church's rector was Horatio Potter. In 1854, after 21 years at St. Peter's, he was chosen as the new bishop of the Diocese of New York. The well-attended consecration ceremony took place at the church.

An organ, the first in the church's history, was installed in 1812. It necessitated the hiring of an organist, and blowing the bellows was added to the sexton's duties. In 1835 the church spent $3,000 ($94,000 in modern dollars) to a Boston builder for a new one with two manuals and 24 stops.

In 1840, the church vestry was reported as having considered whether to build another house of worship for workers on the waterfront. This reflected the city's growing population and industrialization as a result of the opening of the Erie Canal 15 years earlier. It does not appear that anything came of these discussions.

=== 1860–present: Third church ===
By the late 1850s structural problems with the second church were becoming apparent. A new design was commissioned from Richard Upjohn, an English immigrant who had helped introduce the Gothic Revival style for Episcopal churches with Manhattan's Trinity Church, also a National Historic Landmark, in 1846. He worked on the design with his son, Richard M. Upjohn, introducing a distinctly French Gothic sensibility that had not been present in the earlier church.

The old church was demolished in 1859. Construction immediately began on its replacement after the cornerstone was laid on June 29, St. Peter's feast day. The completed structure cost $61,532 ($2.21 million in modern dollars.); it was opened and consecrated in 1860. The former organ was conveyed to St. George's Episcopal Church in Schenectady; Johnson & Son built the replacement.

In 1868 the newly formed Episcopal Diocese of Albany met in convention at St. Peter's to choose a bishop and William Doane, rector of St. Peter's, was chosen on December 3, he was consecrated as such on February 2, 1869, in St. Peter's. Doane began to focus on erecting a permanent cathedral for the new diocese, and accordingly All Saints' Cathedral was built three blocks to the west, at Elk and South Swan streets, was built over the 1880s. Its original, grander plan remained incomplete; the later construction of the State Education Department building on the rest of the block ensured that it will remain so. The current Rector is Mother Christina Hunter.

The church's tower, at the time of completion, had only been 56 feet (17 m) tall, with a temporary roof. In 1875, a bequest from the family of parishioner George Tweddle made it possible to complete it, and the younger Upjohn obliged. The Tweddle bequest also paid for the bells, cast at the Meneely Bell Foundry in nearby Troy. Ten years later the chancel was expanded, and a new altar and reredos, designed by Upjohn as well, with angels sculpted by Louis Saint-Gaudens, were added, followed by the pulpit a year later.

By 1880, the 1860 organ had seriously deteriorated. It was rebuilt by Hook & Hastings. In 1885 stained glass windows by the London designers Clayton & Bell were installed.

== Services and programs ==
Holy Communion is offered on Sunday and Wednesday mornings. A later Sunday service alternates each week between Communion and Morning Prayer. Sunday school is also held at the same time.

Both children and adults sing in the church's 40-member choir. The former are enrolled in the church's choir school, which has a state charter and is affiliated with the Royal School of Church Music. Every week they receive training and lessons in addition to singing at services; the repertoire spans five centuries. Several times a season they perform major pieces, such as oratorios, sometimes with orchestral accompaniment. The choir has traveled to England to perform several times.

The church's ministries include its altar and flower guilds, as well the Sunday school teachers. Volunteers from the congregation also serve as lay eucharistic ministers, lectors and ushers. The church also operates, in conjunction with other Albany-area churches and the Capital City Rescue Mission, an overflow homeless shelter during the winter.

== See also ==
- History of Albany, New York
- List of National Historic Landmarks in New York
- National Register of Historic Places listings in Albany, New York
