= St. James Episcopal Church (La Grange, Texas) =

Historic church in Texas, United States

- U.S. National Register of Historic Places
- Recorded Texas Historic Landmark
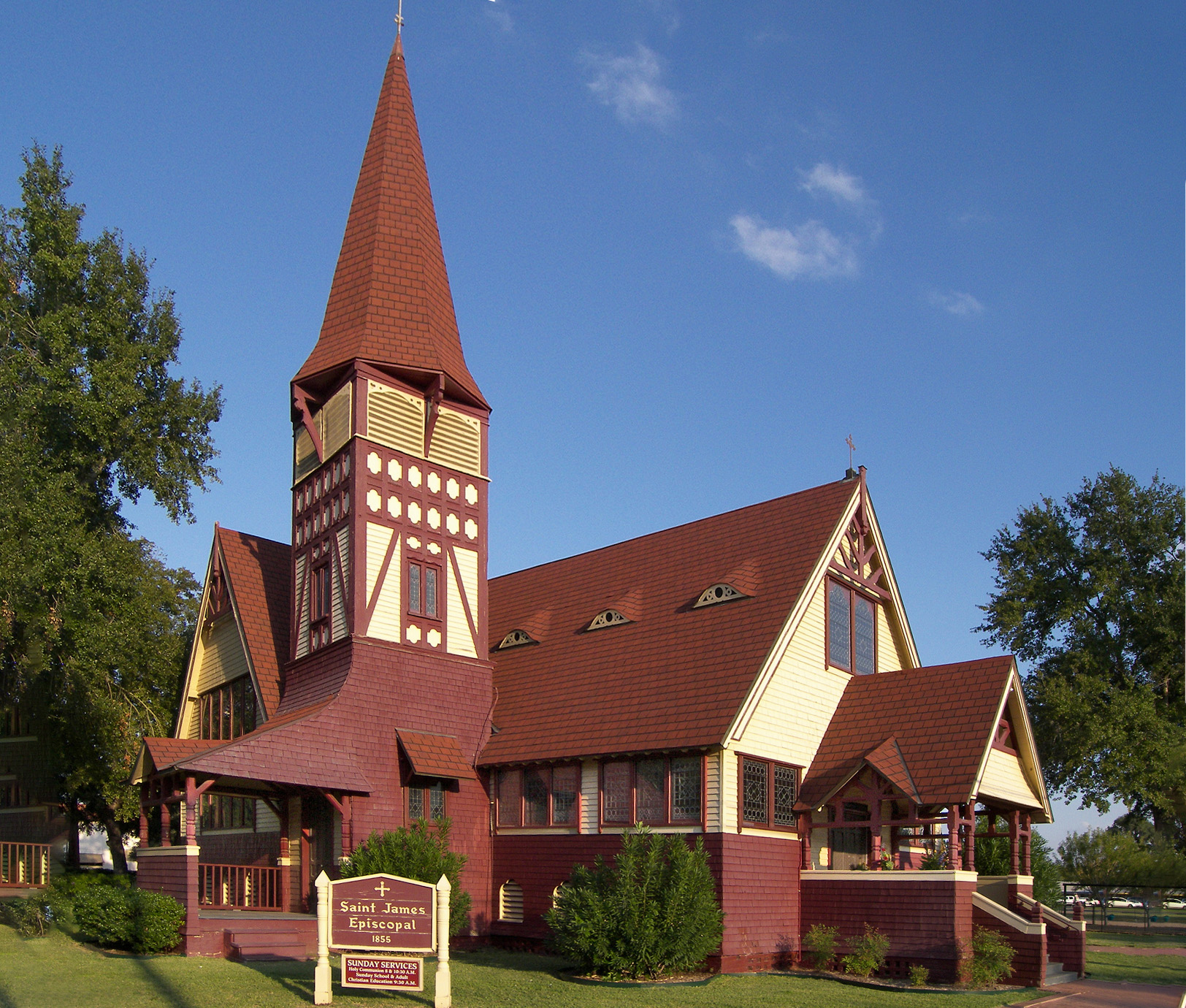
- St. James Church in 2008

- Location within Texas Location within the United States
- Location: Monroe and Colorado Sts., La Grange, Texas
- Coordinates: 29°54′28″N 96°52′25″W
- Area: 1 acre (0.40 ha)
- Built: 1855
- Architect: Richard M. Upjohn
- Architectural style: Stick/Eastlake
- NRHP reference No.: 76002026
- RTHL No.: 4443

Significant dates
- Added to NRHP: June 18, 1976
- Designated RTHL: 1964

St. James' Episcopal Church is a congregation of the Episcopal Church (United States) in La Grange, Texas, under the Episcopal Diocese of Texas. Its campus at Monroe and Colorado Streets includes its historic parish church as well as a sacristy, preschool, and parish hall.

The community was first established on August 18, 1855, as Trinity Parish, with the Rev. Hanibal Pratt as minister. Around 1860 the name was changed to Saint James. Many congregants succumbed to a yellow fever epidemic in 1867, and the community suffered major floods in 1869 and 1870. Nevertheless, it continued to grow, meeting in an old school building it eventually outgrew.

In 2019, the church reported 183 members; in 2023, it reported 141 members. No membership statistics were reported in 2024 national parochial reports. Plate and pledge financial support reported by the church in 2024 was $342,702. Average Sunday Attendance ASA reported in 2024 was 91 persons. This was a relative decrease on ASA of 110 in 2020.

The Rev. W.G.W. Smith arrived in 1876, after the Reconstruction Era, and became its first full-time rector in 1881. Influenced by the Oxford Movement, he retained noted Gothic Revival architect Richard M. Upjohn in 1883 to design the current structure. After a period of fundraising, the cornerstone for the present building was laid on February 5, 1885, on land bequeathed for that purpose by prominent local residents Benjamin and Georgiana Shropshire in 1868. The church was formally consecrated on February 28, 1886.

== Church ==
A Stick style wooden structure (transitional between Carpenter Gothic and Queen Anne, and thus sometimes described as either), the church was built by Carl Michaelis, a local contractor.

The dark red, ivory, and brown exterior is dominated by a large bell tower, with the tower bell struck by the Meneely Bell Foundry of West Troy, New York and installed in 1892. The exterior walls are shingled on the first story with half-timber decor on the second level. The interior features exposed columns and trusses of local yellow pine, with white plastered walls and ceilings.

Its stained glass windows are noted, but the artist or artists are uncertain; the parish speculates that English artist Charles Booth may have designed the elaborate Shropshire memorial, but that other pieces may have been ordered from catalogues. Smith is believed to have designed and built the altar, lectern, communion rail, and Bishop's chair, all of which remain in current use. Smith also designed the pews, built locally by the shop of Frank Reichert, and which also remain in current use. The church was added to the National Register of Historic Places in 1976.

== See also ==
- National Register of Historic Places listings in Fayette County, Texas
- Recorded Texas Historic Landmarks in Fayette County
