= Church of St. Joseph of Arimathea =

Historic church in New York, United States

- U.S. National Register of Historic Places
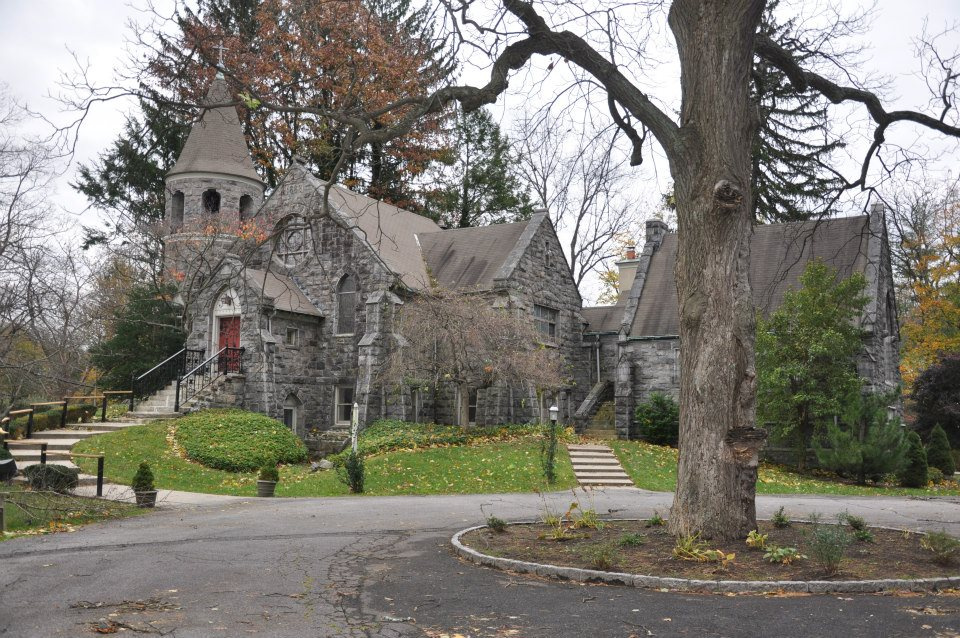

- Location within New York Location within the United States
- Location: 2172 Saw Mill River Rd., Greenburgh, New York
- Coordinates: 41°2′36″N 73°49′45″W
- Area: 3.6 acres (1.5 ha)
- Built: 1883
- Architect: Richard M. Upjohn, Hobart Upjohn
- Architectural style: Gothic Revival
- NRHP reference No.: 01001439
- Added to NRHP: January 11, 2002

Church of St. Joseph of Arimathea, originally known as Worthington Memorial Chapel, is a historic Episcopal church at 2172 Saw Mill River Road in Greenburgh, Westchester County, New York. It was designed by architect Richard M. Upjohn (1828 – 1903) and built in 1883 in an eclectic Victorian Gothic Revival style. It was built in four phases: The original 1883 chapel, the 1901 addition, the addition in 1953 of a ground floor meeting room, and an enlargement and remodeling of the 1953 addition in 1990. The original chapel and 1901 addition are built of random-coursed, rock faced ashlar with corner buttresses, and high pitched gable roof with low parapets. The chapel is cruciform in plan and features a three-story bell tower with large segmental arched opening and a conical roof. A large three-part stained glass window and smaller three part windows in the two transepts are attributed to John La Farge (1835 – 1910) and installed around 1883. It was originally built by the family of pump manufacturer Henry Rossiter Worthington (1817-1880) as a chapel and crypt.

It was added to the National Register of Historic Places in 2002.

== See also ==
- National Register of Historic Places listings in southern Westchester County, New York
