= Fay Club =

- U.S. National Register of Historic Places
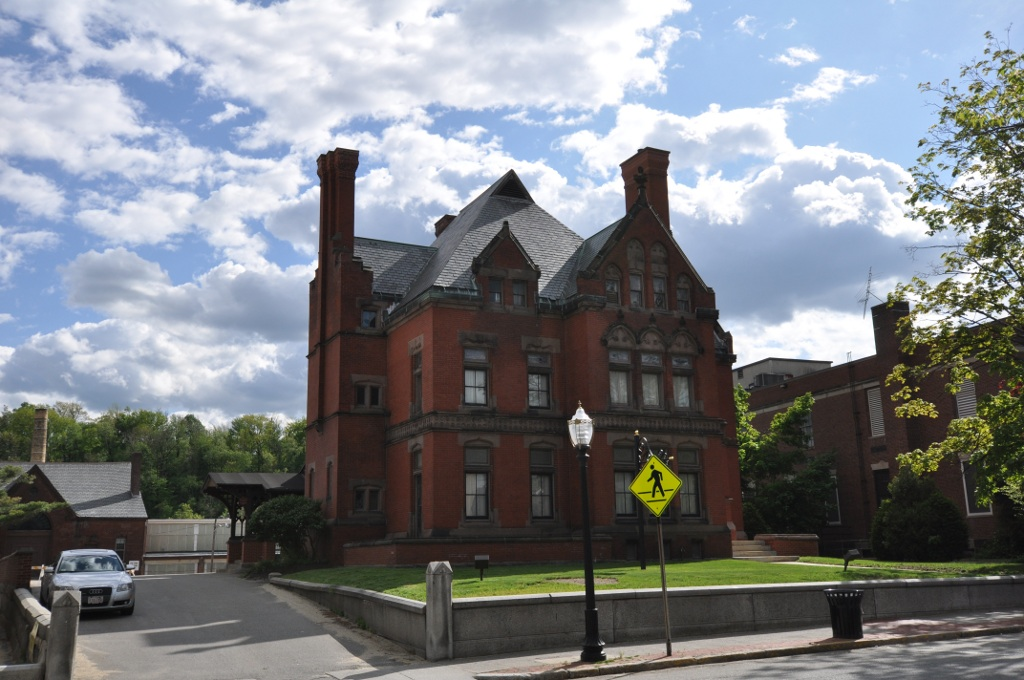

- Location within Massachusetts
- Location: 658 Main St., Fitchburg, Massachusetts
- Coordinates: 42°34′59″N 71°48′9″W
- Built: 1884
- Architect: Richard M. Upjohn
- Architectural style: Gothic
- NRHP reference No.: 78000470
- Added to NRHP: 31 January 1978

The Fay Club is a private social club located at 658 Main Street in Fitchburg, Massachusetts. It has operated since 1910. The club's building was designed in 1883 by Richard M. Upjohn as the private home of George Fay and his daughter Lucy, and was constructed in 1884. The clubhouse was listed on the National Register of Historic Places in 1978.

== Clubhouse ==
The former Fay Club building stands in downtown Fitchburg, on the south side of Main Street, between Wood Place and Newton Place next to the public library. It is a large and distinctive red brick building with sandstone trim, 2-1/2 stories in height, with asymmetrical massing and trim typical of the Late Victorian Gothic period. It is covered by a hip roof with a gabled peak, and has projecting gabled sections to the north and east, along with two chimney stacks with decorative corbelling. The interior of the ground floor is largely intact, with original woodwork carving and panels, as well as painted frescoes.

== Club history ==
George Flagg Fay was a prominent businessman in Fitchburg, and was a charter member of the Park Club, founded in 1881 and housed in a building at the corner of Main Street and Wallace Street. He built the house at 658 Main in 1883-4; its position allowed him to walk across the street to the Club's facility. When he died, his daughter Lucy inherited the property, and continued to reside there until 1910, when she moved to another part of the country. She decided to donate the house to her father's club; the donation was gratefully received, and to mark its significance, the club voted to change its name to the Fay Club.

At the time located at the center of a thriving business community, the club served both as a meetingplace, dining facility, and a networking spot. Later, as families of members moved through its auspices, it became a center for weddings, showers, and reunions. However, as the city grew and transferred its vibrant core toward its suburbs, the Club membership dwindled. For the last 30 years of its existence the facility was closed during the summer months, re-opening in September. Then in June 2015, the Board determined that that year's closure would be permanent.

As of January 2016, the building was being offered for sale to the public. However, as of October 2016, the club had reopened following a groundswell of support and fundraising by a small group of active members.

== See also ==
- National Register of Historic Places listings in Worcester County, Massachusetts
