= United States Post Office (Peekskill, New York) =

- U.S. National Register of Historic Places
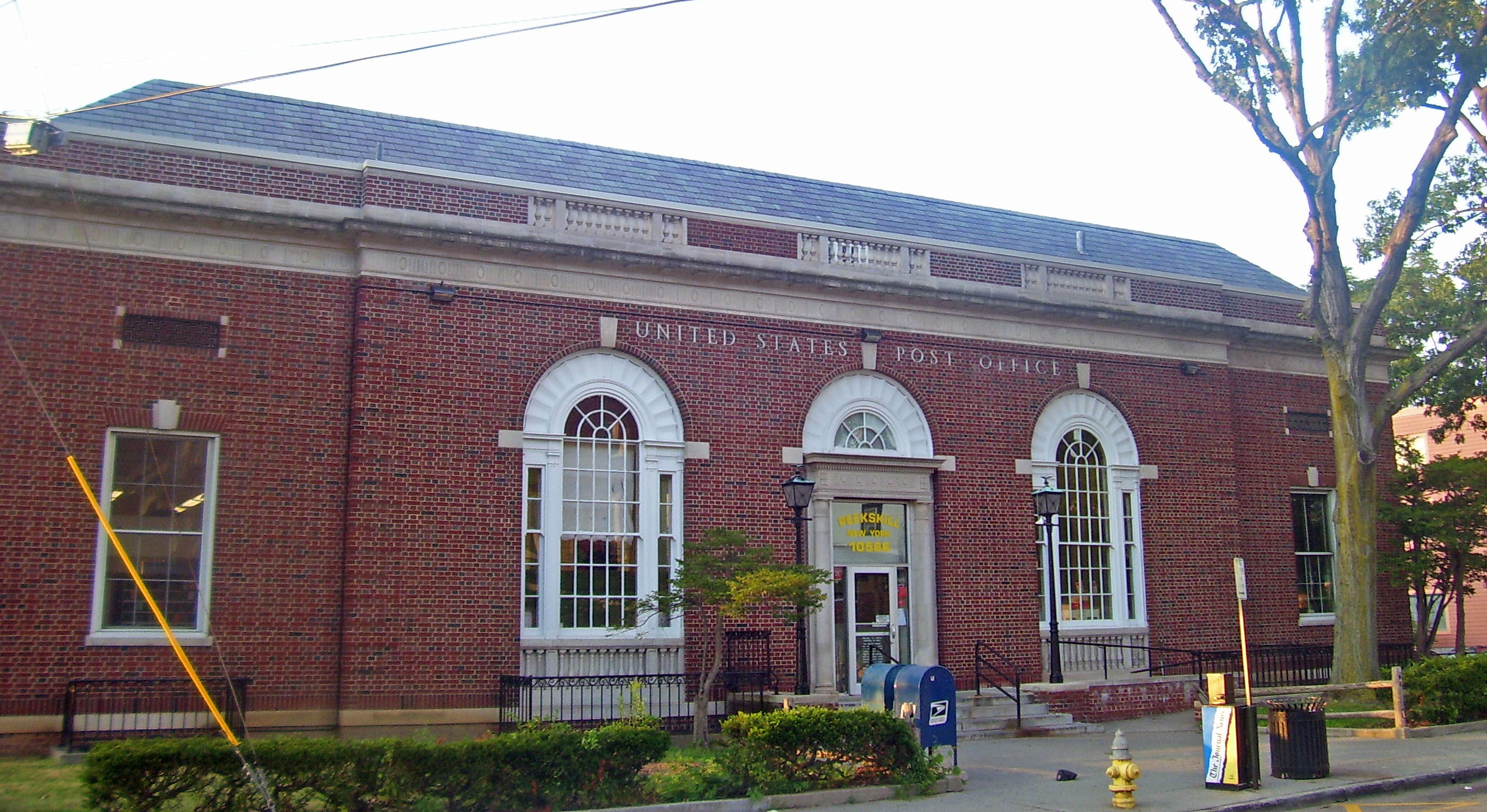
- South elevation with Palladian windows, 2008

- Location within New York Location within the United States
- Location: Peekskill, New York
- Coordinates: 41°17′22″N 73°55′22″W
- Area: less than one acre
- Built: 1931
- Architect: Office of the Supervising Architect under James A. Wetmore
- Architectural style: Colonial Revival
- MPS: US Post Offices in New York State, 1858-1943, TR
- NRHP reference No.: 88002401
- Added to NRHP: May 11, 1989

The United States Post Office in Peekskill, New York, is located on South Street. It is a brick building in the Colonial Revival architectural style, serving the 10566 ZIP Code, which covers the city of Peekskill and some surrounding areas in the town of Cortlandt.

It was built in the early years of the Great Depression as an economic stimulus. The neoclassic arch-headed windows on its front facade are unusual on a post office in New York built prior to the Franklin D. Roosevelt administration. In 1989 it was added to the National Register of Historic Places.

== Building ==
The post office is located on the north side of South Street, on the southeast corner of a large, triangular lot it has all to itself. The ground slopes down to the north. Across the street are Peekskill Presbyterian Church and an assortment of commercial and residential buildings, similar to the neighborhood to the east, which has mixed-use apartment buildings. A row of mature oak trees screens the front of the building.

It is a one-story rectangular building sided in brick laid in English bond with limestone and wood trim. The south (front) facade features a projecting central pavilion with three semicircular wood-arched windows with keystones and rectangular blocks at the springlines. Such tripartite windows unified by a fanlike recessed tympanum, here typically with the radiating fluting of a patera, are elements of English Neoclassical architecture as practiced most familiarly by Robert Adam. The two bays on the ends have regular rectangular windows with keystones and a decorative recessed panel above. Below the two front windows flanking the main entrance are balustrades and cast iron fences around window wells allowing light into the basement.

Above the arches is raised metal lettering saying "UNITED STATES POST OFFICE" below a limestone frieze with geometric decoration. The roofline is marked by a plain cornice, topped with a limestone-coped brick parapet interrupted by stone balustrades above each of the three central bays.

A similar window treatment is found along the east profile. The west profile of the building has one window similar to the others, with a large wing projecting outwards for the loading dock. It wraps around the north as well.

Stone steps flanked by cast iron lampposts rise to the main entrance. The modern glass door is framed by projecting Doric pilasters. These support a plain frieze and denticulated cornice, above which is the same archivolt found on the flanking windows.

Inside, the lobby has marble wainscoting and high plaster ceilings with a deep cornice. The windows have Adamesque carved wood surrounds. A Palladian window is on the inside wall. The entrance to the postmaster's office has two narrow stop-fluted pilasters supporting blocks with carved urns and a swagged frieze.

== History ==
The site was first used for a post office in 1911. Three years earlier, Congress had authorized the purchase of the lot to facilitate a move from the post office's previous location a few blocks away. An existing Victorian house was modified and renovated under plans by James Knox Taylor, the only time prior to World War II that the Treasury Department renovated an existing structure for postal use rather than build a new one.

In 1928 the current structure was authorized, and reauthorized again in 1930. The second time $165,000 ($3.18 million in contemporary dollars) was appropriated for construction, an early response to the Great Depression. The building was begun later that year and opened in 1931.

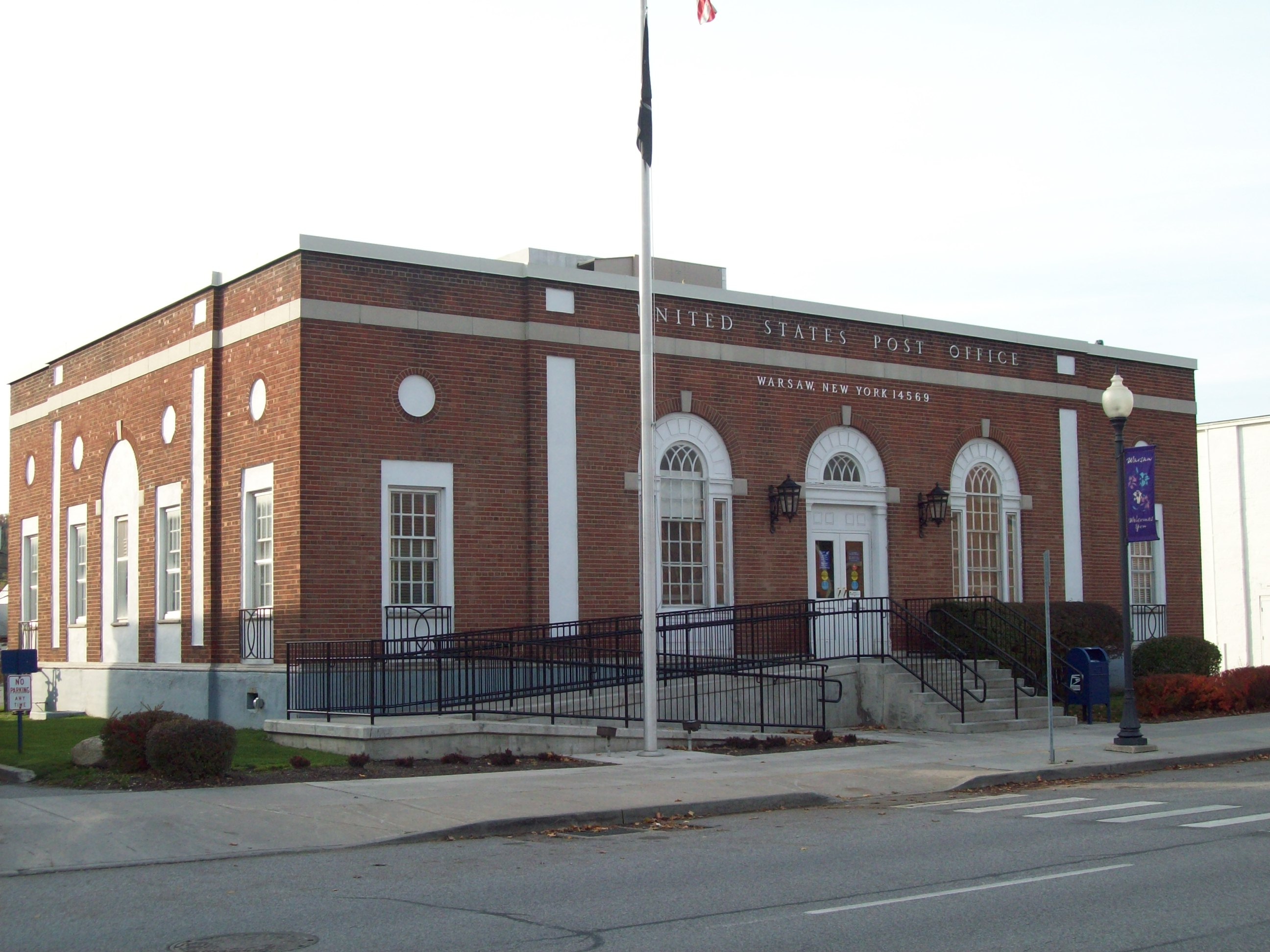
Warsaw post office

It was designed by the Office of the Supervising Architect under James A. Wetmore and likely to have been the work of Louis A. Simon. It uses the free interpretation of "Colonial Revival" style which had been standard for most new post offices since 1915. The Peekskill design stands out in its use of distinctly neoclassical "Adam" features, particularly the English-bond brickwork and the windows. The latter feature would not be used on other post offices in New York (particularly Warsaw's) until the New Deal and its building programs were underway several years later.

In 1967 the large wing to the north and west was added. It is intended to be architecturally sympathetic, but is not considered to be contributing to the Register listing due to its relatively recent construction.

== See also ==
- National Register of Historic Places listings in Peekskill, New York
