= St. Margaret of Antioch Episcopal Church (Staatsburg, New York) =

St. Margaret's Episcopal Church
- St. Margaret's Episcopal Church
- 41°50′59″N 73°55′39″W
- Address: East Elm Avenue, Staatsburg, NY
- Country: United States
- Denomination: Episcopal
- Website: stmargaretsepiscopalchurch.org

Architecture
- Architect: Richard M. Upjohn
- Completed: 1892

St. Margaret of Antioch Episcopal Church is a parish of the Episcopal Church in Staatsburg, New York, in the Diocese of New York. It is noted for its historic parish church, completed in 1892.

The church reported 74 members in 2018 and 59 members in 2023; no membership statistics were reported in 2024 parochial reports. Plate and pledge income reported for the congregation in 2024 was $43,431 with average Sunday attendance (ASA) of 37 persons.

The original Episcopal church in Staatsburg was built in 1858 and functioned as a mission for St. James Episcopal Church of Hyde Park, located several miles south of Staatsburg.

The foundation stone for the present church was laid in 1891 and the building, which was designed by Richard M. Upjohn, was completed in 1892. Upon its completion, the original church became the Staatsburg town library.

Two of the church's stained-glass windows date to the 13th century. They were given to Ogden Mills Sr. Their origins are unclear (perhaps removed from a church in the war zone). It is known they were given to Mills by the French government in thanks for his contributions to the war effort which included allowing the US government to use the family's mansion in Paris. Mills donated the windows in memory of his wife, Ruth Livingston Mills.

A pair of windows on the church's north side, which feature Margaret of Antioch with a dragon, appear to have been made by J. Wippell & Co., but their path to the church is unknown.

The church also has a Chapman tracker organ, installed 1895 and renovated in 1985.

Horace Stringfellow was the inaugural priest and he was succeeded by Samuel R. Johnson, Chas L. Short (1876–1880), Francis J. Clayton (1880–1882), and George W.S. Ayres. It was under the latter's leadership that the congregation took the steps to become an official parish.

Since 2023, Rev. Michael Corrigan serves as St. Margaret's Priest in Charge.
