= Jacob Adolphus Holzer =

American artist

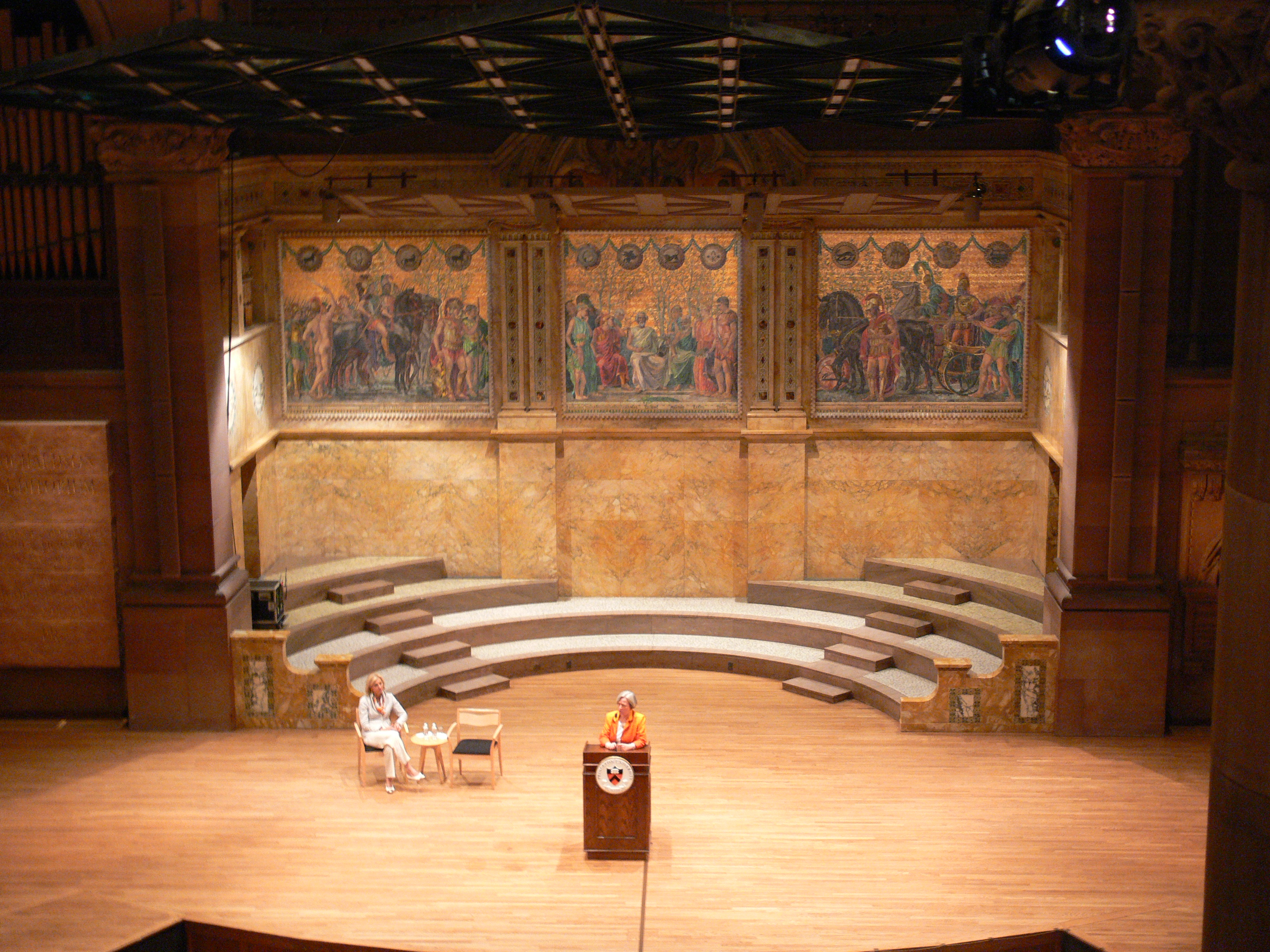
Homeric Story mosaic at Alexander Hall, Princeton University, 1894

Jacob Adolphus Holzer (1858–1938) was a Swiss-born designer, muralist, mosaicist, interior designer, and sculptor who was associated with both John La Farge and Augustus Saint-Gaudens before he left to direct the mosaic workshops of Louis Comfort Tiffany, where he was preceded by his friend from La Farge's studio, the German immigrant Joseph Lauber (1855—1948). Holzer worked with Tiffany until 1898.

Holzer designed the sculptural electrified lantern that became famous at the World's Columbian Exposition, Chicago 1893, one of two electrified lanterns that have been called the "ancestors" of all later Tiffany lamps. In New York some of his work with Tiffany can be seen in the lobby of The Osborne, 205 West 57th Street, New York City. In Boston, he designed mosaics and three stained-glass windows for the Central Congregational Church, 67 Newbury Street (1893), and perhaps the Frederick Ayer Mansion, Commonwealth Avenue (1899–1901). In Chicago his mosaics are featured in Tiffany's public spaces of Holabird & Roche's Marquette Building, Chicago (1894, building completed 1895). He was the designer of the Tiffany dome at the Chicago Cultural Center, 78 East Washington Street (1897, Shepley, Rutan & Coolidge, architects). At Princeton, his mosaics of subjects from Homer fill the rear wall of Alexander Hall (William Appleton Potter, architect, 1895, now Richardson auditorium). In Troy, New York, his stained-glass east window and baptistry mosaics can be seen in St Paul's Church, remodeled under Tiffany's direction .

On leaving Tiffany studios, he traveled in the Near East. He provided some of the illustrations for Mary Bowers Warren, Little Journeys Abroad (Boston, 1894).

== Gallery ==
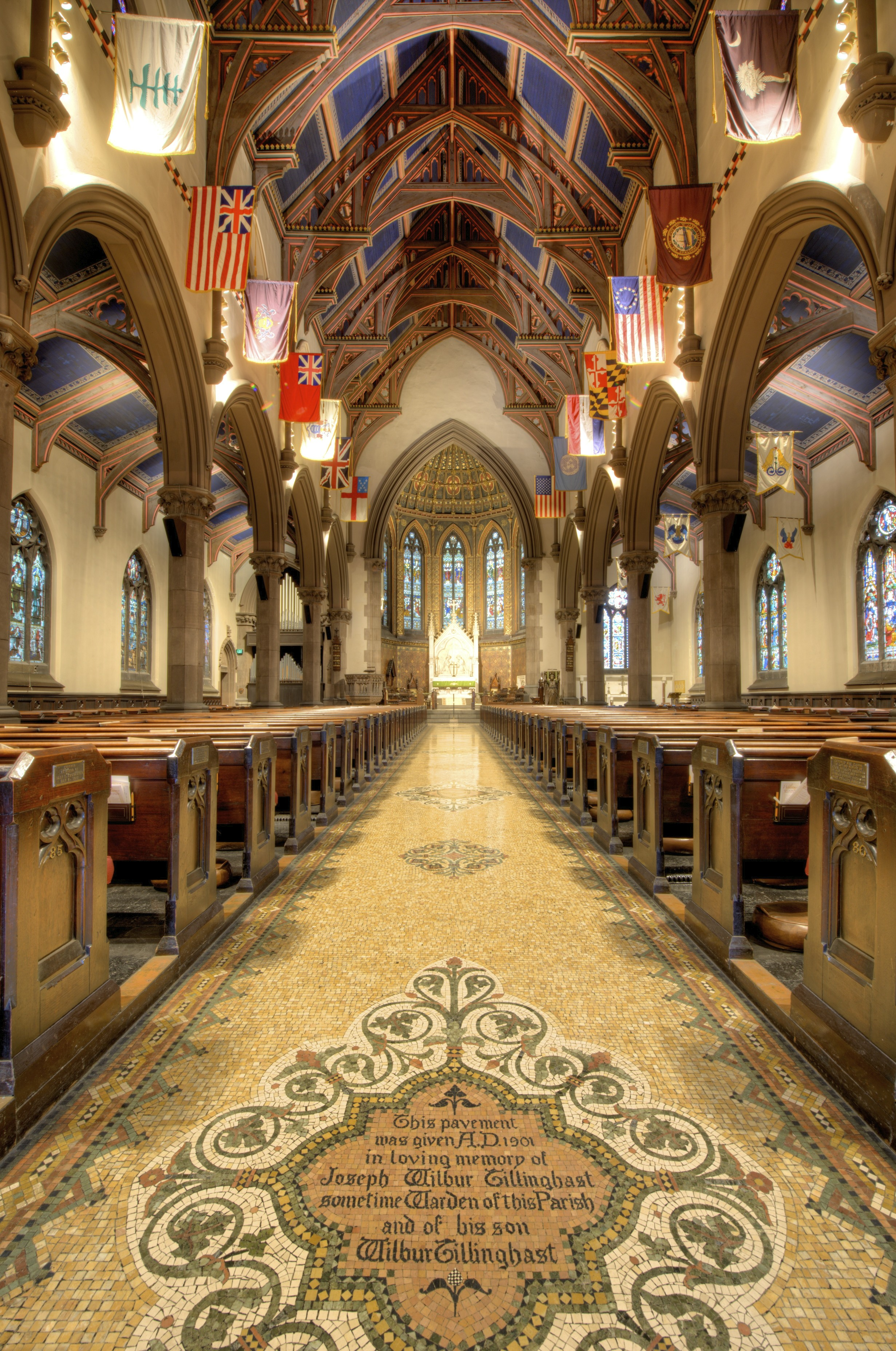
Center aisle of St. Peter's Episcopal Church (Albany, New York)

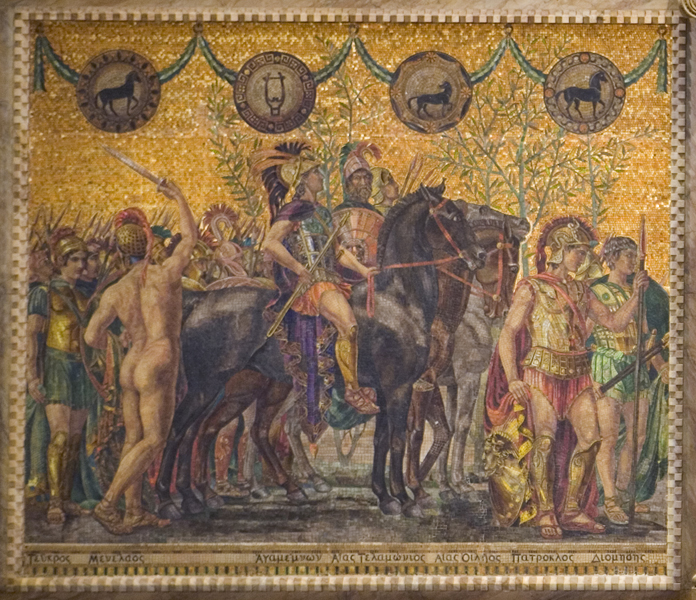
Homeric Story, 1894, Alexander Hall, Princeton University, left detail featuring Agamemnon, Menelaus, and other notable Achaeans

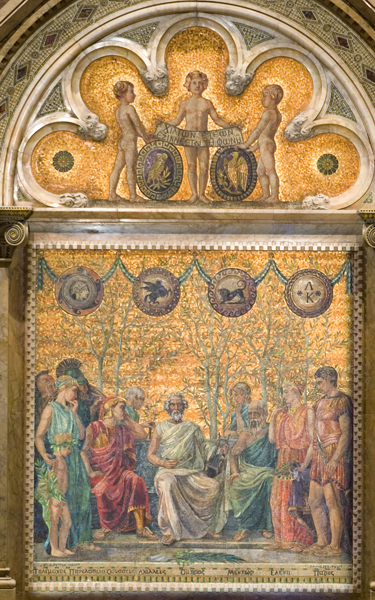
Homeric Story, 1894, center detail featuring Homer, Paris, Helen, and Achilles

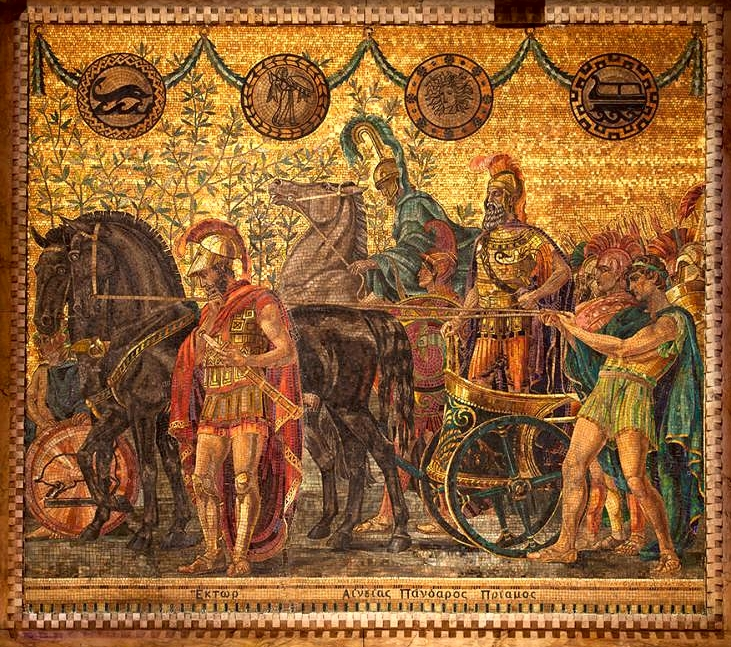
Homeric Story, 1894, right detail featuring Hector, Priam, and other Trojans
