= Richard M. Upjohn =

American architect

Richard Michell Upjohn
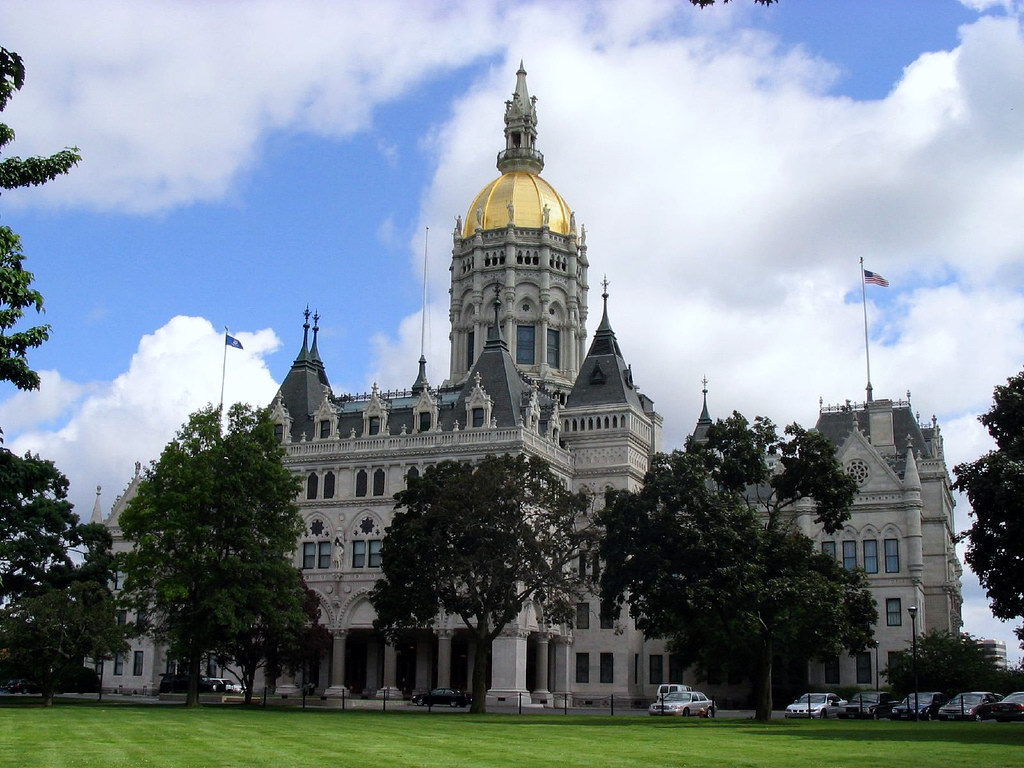
- The Connecticut State Capitol in Hartford, Connecticut.
- Born: March 7, 1828; Shaftesbury, England
- Died: March 3, 1903 (aged 74); Brooklyn, New York
- Occupation: Architect
- Spouse: Emma Degen Tyng (m. 1856)
- Buildings: Connecticut State Capitol in Hartford

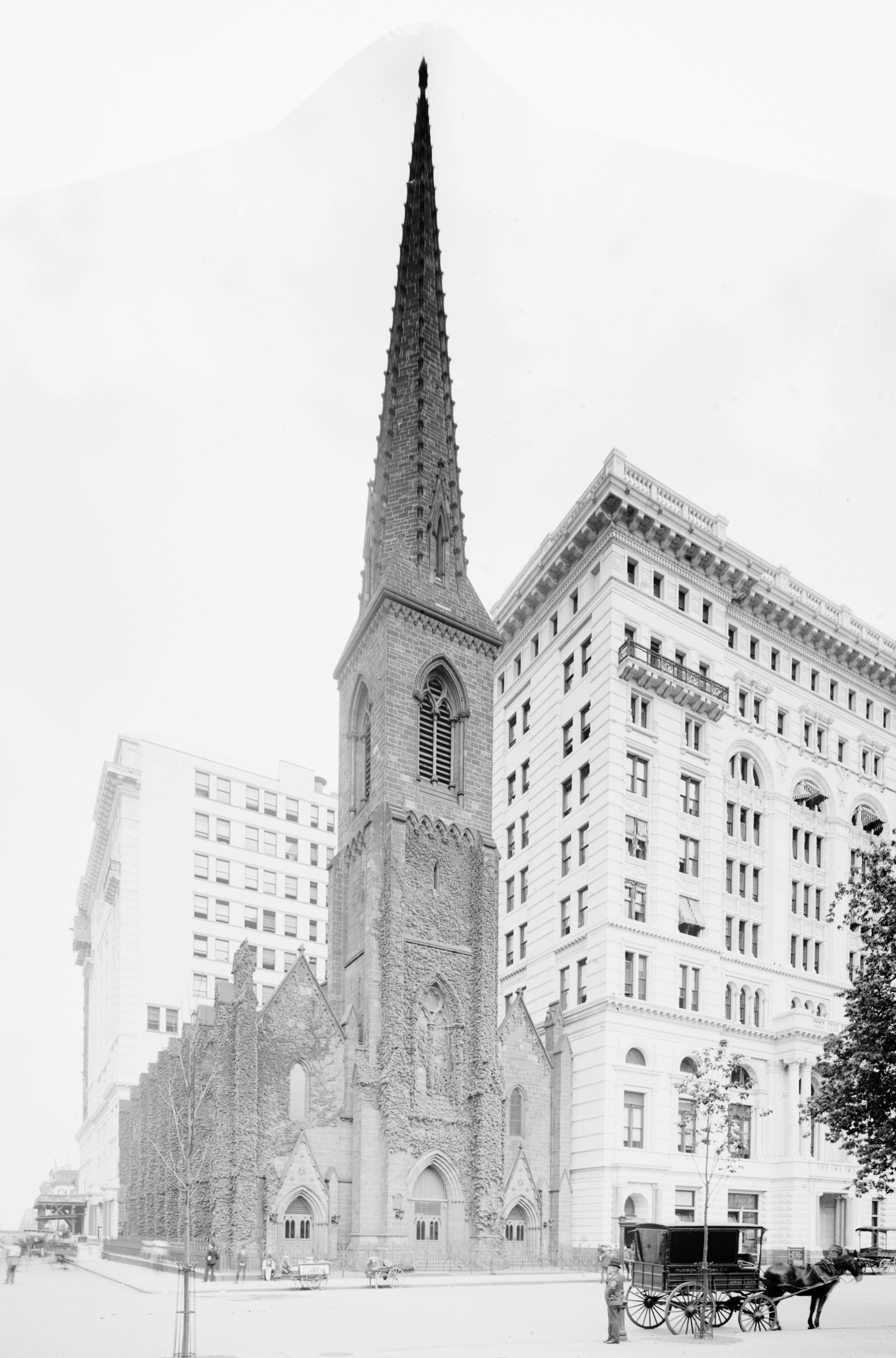
Madison Square Presbyterian Church (1853–54), Upjohn's first design on his own

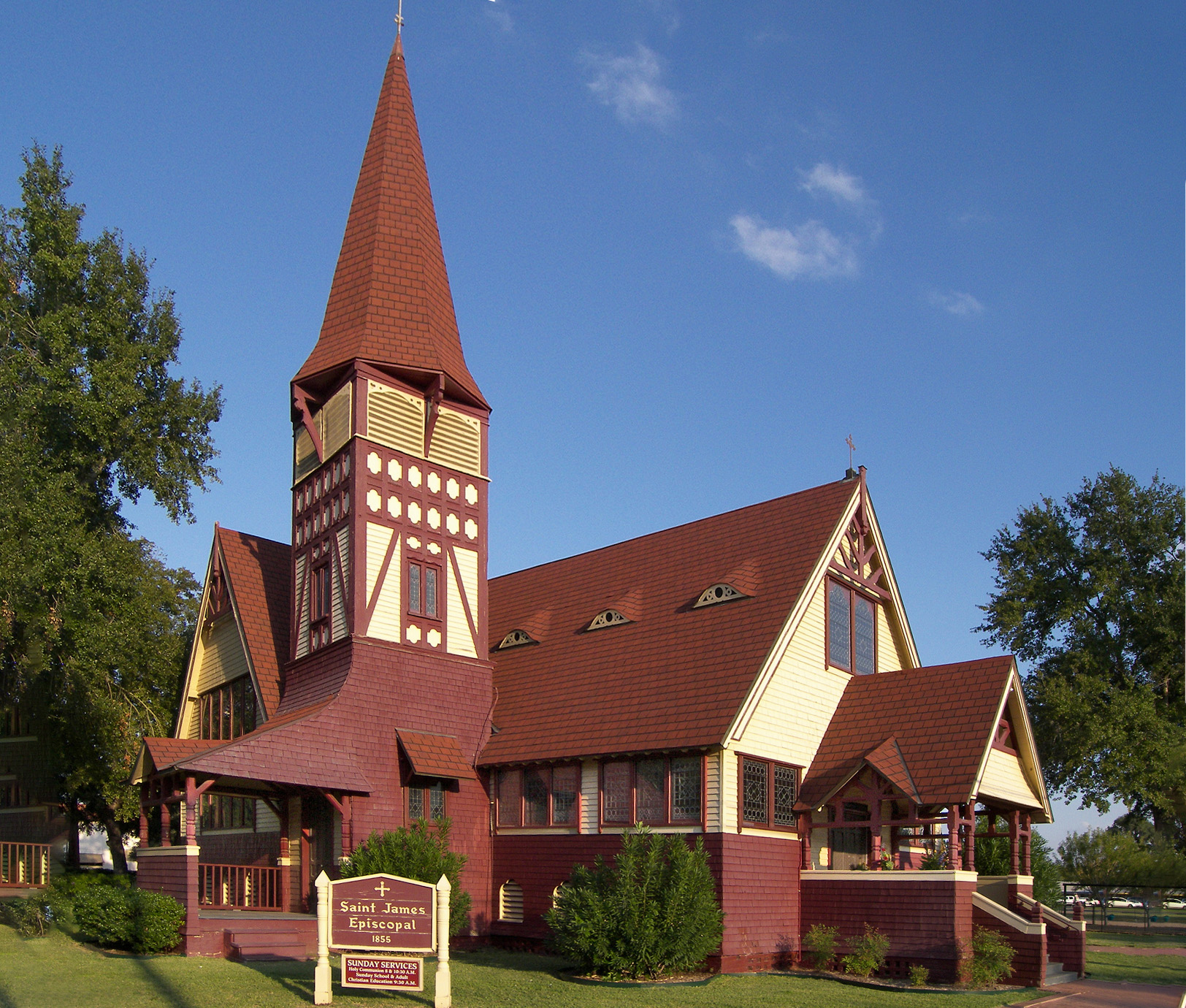
St. James Episcopal Church (1855) in La Grange, Texas

Richard Michell Upjohn, FAIA, (March 7, 1828 – March 3, 1903) was an American architect, co-founder and president of the American Institute of Architects.

== Early life and career ==
Upjohn was born on March 7, 1828, in Shaftesbury, Dorsetshire, England and his family emigrated to the United States in 1829. He was the son of the famous architect Richard Upjohn (1802–1878) and Elizabeth (née Parry) Upjohn (1803–1882).

In 1853, at eighteen years old, he joined his father's New York architectural firm to study architecture and later became his father's partner. The earliest building that architectural scholars credit to him alone is Madison Square Presbyterian Church in New York City, built from 1853 to 1854. He became best known, much like his father, for his High Gothic Revival style of architecture. He, again like his father, was a founding member and president of the American Institute of Architects.

A number of noteworthy architects trained in his office, including Clarence Fagan True. A number of buildings that he designed are now listed on the National Register of Historic Places (NRHP). Four are listed as National Historic Landmarks.

== Personal life ==
On October 1, 1856, Upjohn was married to Emma Degen Tyng (1836–1906). Together, they were the parents of three daughters and five sons, including Hobart Upjohn, who practiced as a civil engineer and architect.

Upjohn died on March 3, 1903, at his home, 296 Clinton Street, in Brooklyn, New York. He was buried in Green-Wood Cemetery, for which he and his father had done design work many years before.

== Works with Richard Upjohn ==
- St. John Chrysostom Church (1851) in Delafield, Wisconsin, on the NRHP
- St. Peter's Episcopal Church (1859) in Albany, New York, a National Historic Landmark
- Trinity-St. Paul's Episcopal Church (1862–63) in New Rochelle, New York, on the NRHP
- All Saint's Memorial Church (1864) in Navesink, New Jersey, a National Historic Landmark
- The third Saint Thomas Church (1865–70) in New York City, destroyed by fire in 1905
- Green-Wood Cemetery (1860s) in Brooklyn, New York, a National Historic Landmark
- Edwin A. Stevens Hall (1871) in Hoboken, New Jersey, on the NRHP
- St. Paul's Episcopal Church (1871–75) in Selma, Alabama, on the NRHP

== Works as Richard M. Upjohn ==
Individual projects include:

- Madison Square Presbyterian Church (1853–54), at Madison Avenue and 24th Street, New York City, demolished for Stanford White's Madison Square Presbyterian Church (1906)
- St. James Episcopal Church (1855) in La Grange, Texas, on the NRHP
- St. Luke's Church (1857) in Clermont, New York, on the NRHP
- Christ Church Episcopal (1866) in Riverdale, New York, on the NRHP
- St. Alban's Episcopal Church (1865) in Staten Island, New York, on the NRHP
- Church of the Covenant (1865–67) in Boston, Massachusetts
- St. Paul's Church (1866) in Brooklyn, New York, on the NRHP
- St. John's Protestant Episcopal Church (1869) in Stamford, Connecticut, on the NRHP
- Trinity Church (1871) in Thomaston, Connecticut, on the NRHP
- First National Bank (1871) in Salt Lake City, Utah, on the NRHP
- Connecticut State Capitol (1871–1878) in Hartford, Connecticut, a National Historic Landmark
- Saint Andrew's Episcopal Church (1873) in Rochester, New York, on the NRHP
- Fay Club (1883) in Fitchburg, Massachusetts, on the NRHP
- Church of St. Joseph of Arimathea (1883) in Greenburgh, New York, on the NRHP
- St. Mark's Episcopal Church (1886) in Augusta, Maine, on the NRHP
- St. Margaret of Antioch Episcopal Church (1892) in Staatsburg, New York.
- St. George's Protestant Episcopal Church (1887) in Brooklyn, New York, on the NRHP
- St. Peter's Episcopal Church (1891) in Peekskill, New York, on the NRHP
- Church of St. John in the Wilderness (1852) in Copake Falls, New York, on the NRHP
- St. Barnabas Episcopal Church (1883) in Deland, Florida.
