= Drum Hill High School =

- U.S. National Register of Historic Places
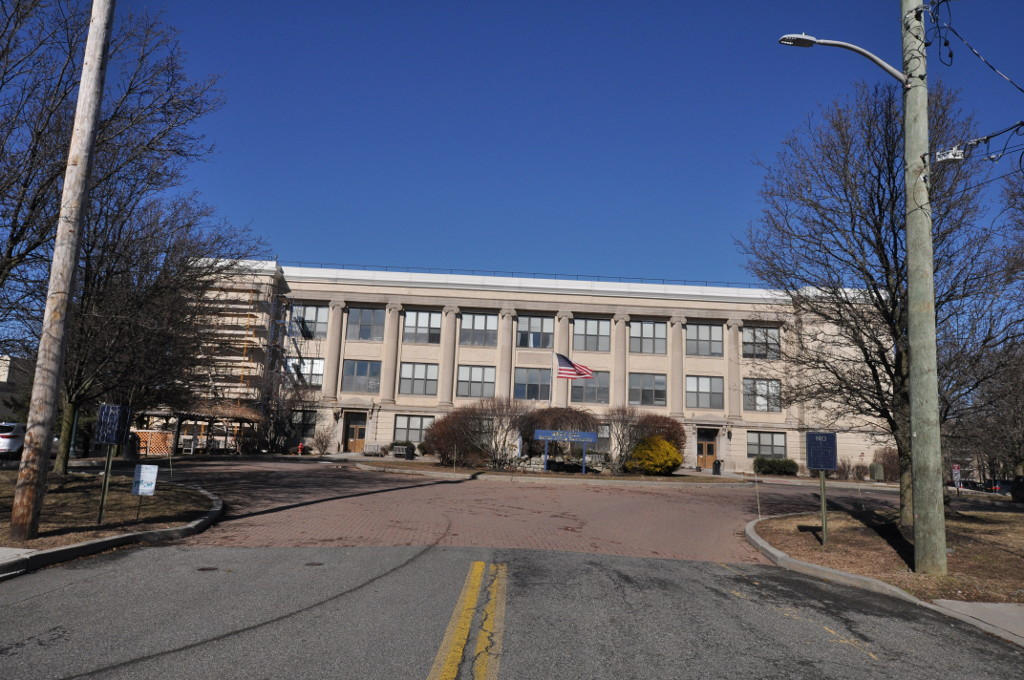

- Location within New York Location within the United States
- Location: Ringgold Street; Peekskill, New York; United States
- Coordinates: 41°17′17″N 73°55′24″W
- Area: 4.3 acres (1.7 ha)
- Built: 1909
- Architect: Joralemon, Edward E.
- Architectural style: Classical Revival
- NRHP reference No.: 79003797
- Added to NRHP: December 31, 1979

Drum Hill High School, which was readapted for use as Drum Hill Senior Living Community, is a historic school located at Peekskill, Westchester County, New York, United States. It was built between 1909 and 1911 and is a three-story, E-shaped, gray buff pressed brick building in the Classical Revival style. It features an elaborate light court. It had an auditorium, science laboratories, a gymnasium, and classrooms capacity for 1,000 students. It remained in use as a school until 1972. It was later developed into a senior living community.

It was added to the National Register of Historic Places in 1979.
