= National Register of Historic Places listings in Westchester County, New York =

Location of Westchester County in New York

This is a list of the National Register of Historic Places listings in Westchester County, New York.

This is intended to be a complete list of the properties and districts on the National Register of Historic Places in Westchester County, New York, United States. Latitude and longitude coordinates are provided for many National Register properties and districts; these locations may be seen together in a map.

There are 244 properties and districts listed on the National Register in the county, including 19 National Historic Landmarks. The cities of New Rochelle, Peekskill, and Yonkers are the locations of 13, 14, and 28 of these properties and districts respectively, including two National Historic Landmarks (one in New Rochelle and one in Yonkers).

This National Park Service list is complete through NPS recent listings posted December 5, 2025.

Contents: Counties in New York
Albany (Albany) – Allegany – Bronx – Broome – Cattaraugus – Cayuga – Chautauqua – Chemung – Chenango – Clinton – Columbia – Cortland – Delaware – Dutchess (Poughkeepsie, Rhinebeck) – Erie (Buffalo) – Essex – Franklin – Fulton – Genesee – Greene – Hamilton – Herkimer – Jefferson – Kings – Lewis – Livingston – Madison – Monroe (Rochester) – Montgomery – Nassau – New York (Below 14th Street, 14th to 59th Streets, 59th to 110th Streets, Above 110th Street, Islands) – Niagara (Niagara Falls) – Oneida – Onondaga (Syracuse) – Ontario – Orange – Orleans – Oswego – Otsego – Putnam – Queens – Rensselaer – Richmond – Rockland – St. Lawrence – Saratoga – Schenectady – Schoharie – Schuyler – Seneca – Steuben – Suffolk – Sullivan – Tioga – Tompkins – Ulster – Warren – Washington – Wayne – Westchester (Northern, Southern, New Rochelle, Peekskill, Yonkers) – Wyoming – Yates

== See also ==
- National Register of Historic Places listings in New York
