= Peekskill Downtown Historic District =

Historic district in New York, United States

- U.S. National Register of Historic Places
- U.S. Historic district
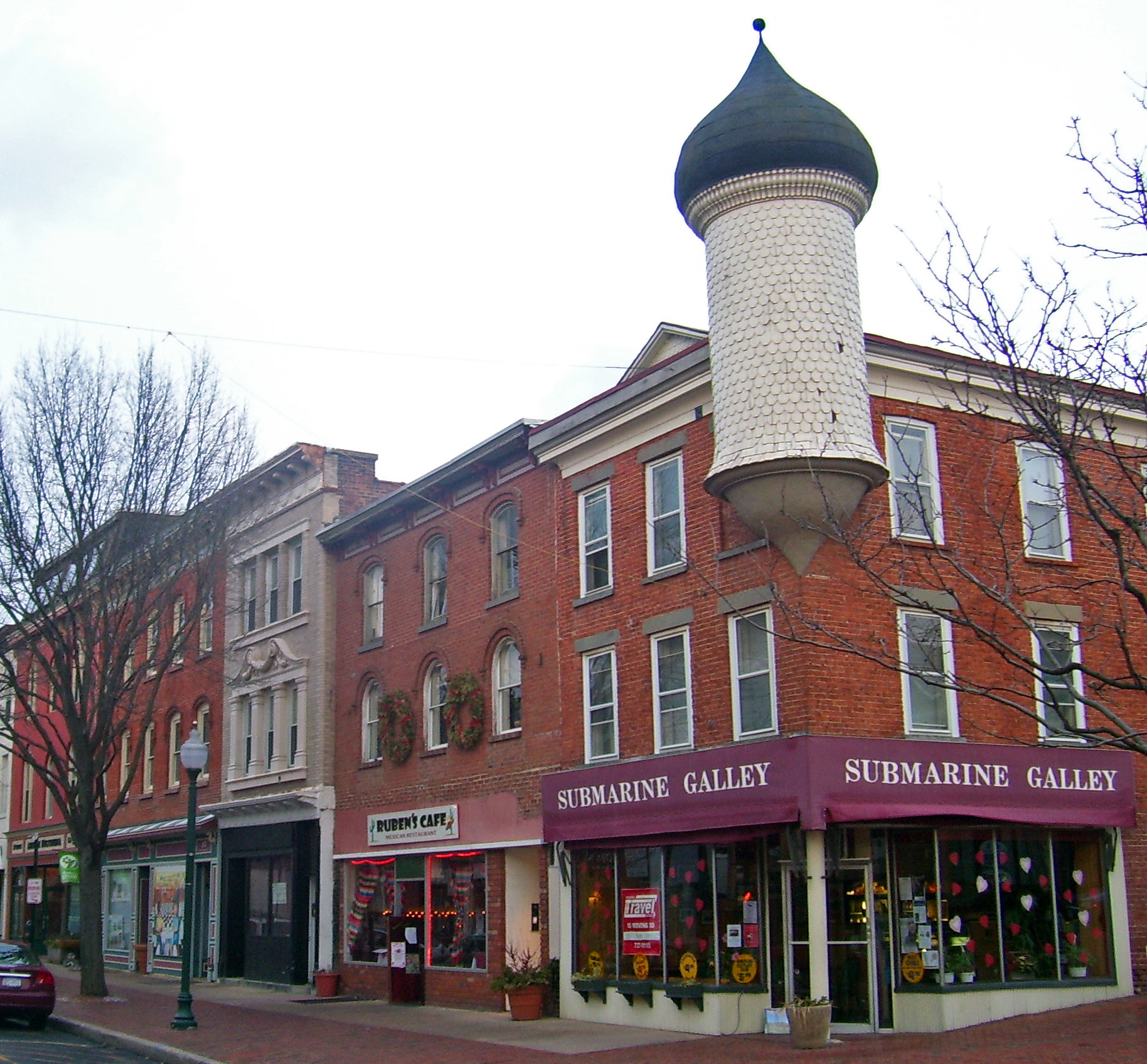
- Moorish Revival tower at Division and Park streets, 2008

- Location within New York Location within the United States
- Location: Peekskill, NY
- Coordinates: 41°17′30″N 73°55′11″W
- Area: 40 acres (16 ha)
- Built: 19th century
- Architectural style: Greek Revival, Italianate
- NRHP reference No.: 04000095
- Added to NRHP: May 6, 2005

The Peekskill Downtown Historic District is a historic district located in the downtown section of Peekskill in the U.S. state of New York. It includes the 40 acres (160,000 m^{2}) along Main, Division, South, Park, Bank, Brown, First and Esther streets, and Central and Union avenues, near where those streets intersect. There are 150 buildings and one object counted among its contributing resources.

Peekskill, originally a settlement along the shore of the Hudson River where farmers from inland Westchester County brought produce for transshipment to markets in New York City and elsewhere, began to grow inland in the early 19th century due to the intersection of two major roads that roughly corresponds to today's Central and Division streets. The Albany Post Road, followed later by US 9 until its relocation to the Croton Expressway closer to the river, and the Danbury Turnpike, still followed by US 202 (and, in the western part of the city and district, US 6 and NY 35). Two houses in the district, in a typical Hudson Valley vernacular style, remain from this era.

Industrialization began changing downtown after 1830, with brick buildings supporting that use replacing older wooden ones along Magregere's Creek. Many of the district's churches were built by the mid-19th century. Fashionable houses, later known as "Doctor's Row", were built on Main Street. In the 1880s the Moorish Revival tower was built on a structure in the center of town that has remained a landmark for passing travelers ever since. Other late Victorian styles made their mark as well.

In the 20th century, some more buildings were added in more modern contemporary styles, and the increasing use of the automobile affected downtown as well. The decline of retail shopping in the district led to urban renewal efforts in the 1960s and 70s. While some historic buildings were razed, the major urban renewal projects coincided with the eastern boundary of the downtown core, sparing most of it. The district was recognized and added to the National Register of Historic Places in 2004 as a rare example of intact 19th-century Hudson Valley downtown architecture.
