= List of National Historic Landmarks in New York =

The New York State Capitol was declared a National Historic Landmark in 1979

This is a list of National Historic Landmarks and comparable other historic sites designated by the U.S. government in the U.S. state of New York. The United States National Historic Landmark (NHL) program operates under the auspices of the National Park Service, and recognizes buildings, structures, objects, sites and districts of resources according to a list of criteria of national significance. There are 277 NHLs in New York state, which is more than 10 percent of all the NHLs nationwide, and the most of any state. The National Park Service also has listed 20 National Monuments, National Historic Sites, National Memorials, and other sites as being historic landmarks of national importance, of which 7 are also designated NHLs. All of these historic landmarks are covered in this list.

There are 146 NHLs in upstate New York, 14 on Long Island, and 117 within New York City (NYC), including one listing in multiple regions. (Note: Croton Aqueduct is in both upstate New York and within NYC.) Four counties have ten or more NHLs: New York County (Manhattan) has 86; Westchester County, just north of NYC, has 19; Suffolk County on Long Island has 11; and Erie County in western New York has 10. Twelve other counties have five to nine NHLs, eight have three or four, 27 counties have one or two, and the remaining twelve of the state's 62 counties have none. The first New York NHLs were eight designated on October 9, 1960; the latest was designated on January 13, 2021. The NHLs and other landmarks outside NYC are listed below; the NHLs in NYC are in this companion article.

Seven NHL sites are among the 20 National Park System historic areas in New York state. The other 13 National Park Service areas are also historic landmark sites of national importance, but are already protected by Federal ownership and administration, so NHL designation is unnecessary. A list of these National Park Service areas that conserve historic sites in New York State is also provided. Finally, three former NHLs in the state are also listed.

The National Historic Landmark Program is administered by the National Park Service, a branch of the Department of the Interior. The National Park Service determines which properties meet NHL criteria and makes nomination recommendations after an owner notification process. The Secretary of the Interior reviews nominations and, based on a set of predetermined criteria, makes a decision on NHL designation or a determination of eligibility for designation. Both public and privately owned properties can be designated as NHLs. This designation provides indirect, partial protection of the historic integrity of the properties via tax incentives, grants, monitoring of threats, and other means. Owners may object to the nomination of the property as an NHL. When this is the case the Secretary of the Interior can only designate a site as eligible for designation.

== Overview ==
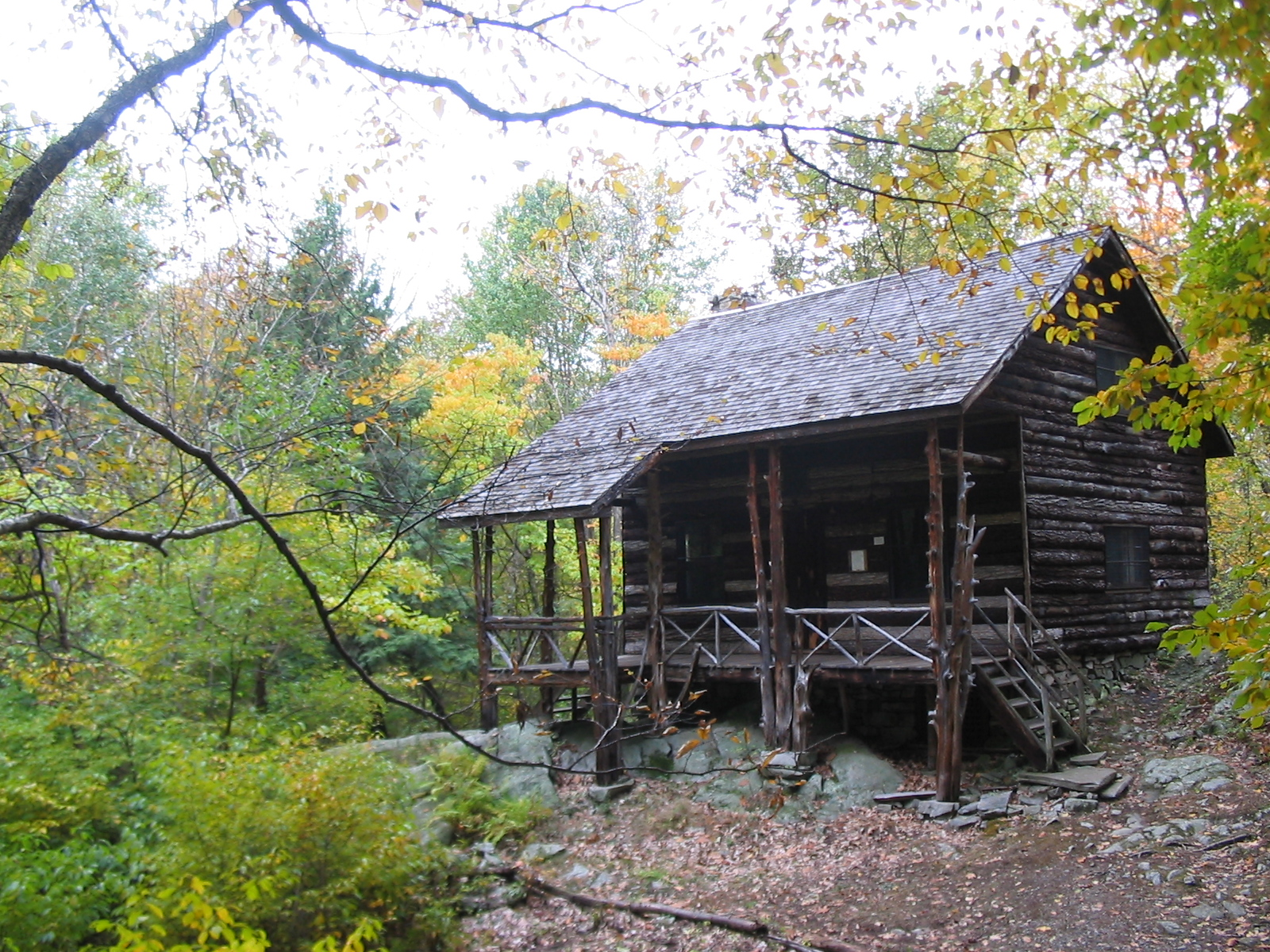
Slabsides, nature retreat of John Burroughs

New York State NHLs include ten prehistoric or other archeological sites, (Note: The nine archeological sites are: Boston Post Road Historic District, notable for its African American and Indigenous history and high archaeological sensitivities, Ganondagan State Historic Site, Fort Corchaug Archeological Site, Fort Massapeag Archeological Site, Fort Orange Archeological Site, Lamoka site, Mohawk Upper Castle Historic District, Schuyler Flatts, and two in NYC: (African Burial Ground, and Wards Point Archeological Site).) 12 historical Dutch farmhouses, manors, and historic districts, (Note: The twelve Dutch home sites are: Bronck House, De Wint House, Fort Crailo, Jean Hasbrouck House, Huguenot Street Historic District, Hurley Historic District, Philipsburg Manor House, Van Alen House, and four in NYC (Conference House, Voorlezer's House, Wyckoff-Bennett Homestead, and Wyckoff House).) and 21 architecturally and/or historically important churches or houses of worship. (Note: The twenty-one churches or houses of worship are: one of the three buildings in Cobblestone Historic District, Dutch Reformed Church (Newburgh, New York), Dutch Reformed Church (Sleepy Hollow), First Presbyterian Church (Sag Harbor, New York), First Reformed Protestant Dutch Church of Kingston, Harriet Tubman's Thompson AME Zion Church, the Indian Castle Church in Mohawk Upper Castle Historic District, St. Paul's Cathedral (Buffalo), St. Peter's Episcopal Church (Albany, New York), Willard Memorial Chapel-Welch Memorial Hall and 11 in NYC (Central Synagogue, Church of the Ascension, Eldridge Street Synagogue, Grace Church, New York, Old Quaker Meeting House (Flushing, Queens), Plymouth Church of the Pilgrims, St. Ann and the Holy Trinity Church, Trinity Church, St. George's Episcopal Church, St. Patrick's Cathedral, and St. Paul's Chapel).) Fully 26 NHLs are primarily military, including 13 fort sites (five standing forts, three fortified houses, and five ruins), (Note: The thirteen fort sites include five standing forts: Fort Crown Point, Fort Montgomery (Hudson River), Fort Niagara, Fort Stanwix, and Fort Ticonderoga; three fortified houses: Fort Crailo, Fort Klock, and Fort Johnson; and six ruins: Fort Corchaug Archeological Site, Fort Massapeag Archeological Site, Mohawk Upper Castle Historic District, Fort Orange Archeological Site, and Fort St. Frédéric.) five other battlegrounds, (Note: The five other battlegrounds are: Bennington Battlefield, Newtown Battlefield, Oriskany Battlefield, Plattsburgh Bay, and Stony Point Battlefield.) seven military headquarters, training facilities, arsenals and armories, (Note: The seven military support sites are: Washington's Headquarters, Knox's Headquarters, United States Military Academy, Watervliet Arsenal, and three in NYC (69th Regiment Armory, Quarters A, Brooklyn Navy Yard, and the Seventh Regiment Armory).) and one military shipwreck site. (Note: The shipwreck site is Land Tortoise (shipwreck).) One of these NHLs is associated with the American Civil War, (Note: The military site associated with the Civil War is Watervliet Arsenal.) while all the rest of these forts and other military places are associated with the French and Indian War and/or the American Revolutionary War.

There are nine NHL ships, including a warship and a tugboat that served in World War II, one warship that saw combat in the Vietnam War, three sailing boats, two fireboats and a lightvessel. (Note: The ten ships are: Edward M. Cotter (fireboat), Modesty (sloop), Nash (tugboat), Priscilla (sloop), USS The Sullivans (DD-537), and five in NYC (Ambrose (lightship), Firefighter (fireboat), USS Intrepid, and Lettie G. Howard (schooner)).) Salient in the list are 24 mansions, (Note: The 24 mansions include 17 in the Hudson River valley or otherwise outside NYC: Boston Post Road Historic District, including the 1838 Peter Augustus Jay House, Clermont, Jay Gould Estate, E.H. Harriman Estate, John Hartford House, Hyde Hall, Lindenwald, Philipse Manor Hall, John D. Rockefeller Estate, Rose Hill (Fayette), Dr. Oliver Bronson House and Estate, Montgomery Place, Elkanah Watson House, Philip Schuyler Mansion, Sunnyside, Villa Lewaro, and Samuel F. B. Morse House, and seven in NYC: (Bartow-Pell Mansion, Carnegie Mansion, Pierpont Morgan Library, King Manor, Harry F. Sinclair House, Morris-Jumel Mansion, and Van Cortlandt House).) and four sites primarily significant for their architectural landscaping. (Note: The four landscaped sites are Springside (Matthew Vassar Estate) and three in NYC: (Central Park, Green-Wood Cemetery, and New York Botanical Garden).) Many properties, numbering in the thousands, are contributing or non-contributing structures in the state's nine National Historic Landmark Districts. (Note: The nine historic districts are: Boston Post Road Historic District, Chautauqua Historic District, Cobblestone Historic District, Geneseo Historic District, Hudson River Historic District, Huguenot Street Historic District, Hurley Historic District, and two in NYC: Brooklyn Heights Historic District and SoHo-Cast Iron Historic District.) Intellectual accomplishments of New Yorkers are associated with 22 sites, including nine university buildings, (Note: The nine university buildings are: Morrill Hall, Main Building (Vassar College), Vassar College Observatory, Nott Memorial Hall, Elihu Root House, and four in NYC: (Low Memorial Library, Philosophy Hall, Pupin Hall, and Founder's Hall, The Rockefeller University).) ten other NHLs associated with inventions, inventors or scientists, (Note: The ten inventions and scientists NHLs are: General Electric Research Laboratory, W. & L. E. Gurley Building, James Hall Office, John William Draper House, George Eastman House, Irving Langmuir House, Franklin Hough House, Samuel F. B. Morse House, Jethro Wood House, and one in NYC: (Bell Laboratories Building).) and four engineering landmarks, including two bridges that were once the longest of their types. (Note: The four engineering landmarks are: Old Blenheim Bridge, Adams Power Plant Transformer House, and two in NYC: (Brooklyn Bridge and Holland Tunnel).) Commercial accomplishments include 11 historic skyscrapers, five of which were once the tallest in the world, (Note: The eleven skyscrapers include five that were once the tallest in the world, all in NYC: Flatiron Building, Metropolitan Life Insurance Company Tower, Woolworth Building, Chrysler Building, and Empire State Building, and six others: Prudential Building in Buffalo and five in NYC (Bayard-Condict Building, Daily News Building, Equitable Building, McGraw-Hill Building, and New York Life Building).) seven stock exchanges and other buildings important in commercial history, (Note: The seven commercial buildings, all in NYC, are: A. T. Stewart Company Store, American Stock Exchange Building, New York Stock Exchange Building, R. H. Macy and Company Store, New York Cotton Exchange, Chamber of Commerce Building, and Tiffany and Company Building.) two bank buildings, (Note: The two bank buildings are: Troy Savings Bank and New York City's National City Bank Building.) five industrial facilities, (Note: The five industrial facilities are: Adams Power Plant Transformer House, Harmony Mills, W. & L. E. Gurley Building, Rudolph Oyster House, and one in NYC (Lorillard Snuff Mill).) and three water-based civil engineering works. (Note: The three water works are: Croton Aqueduct (Old), Erie Canal National Historic Landmark, and Delaware and Hudson Canal.) Two are architectural oddities. (Note: The two architectural oddities are Armour-Stiner House and Nott Memorial Hall.)

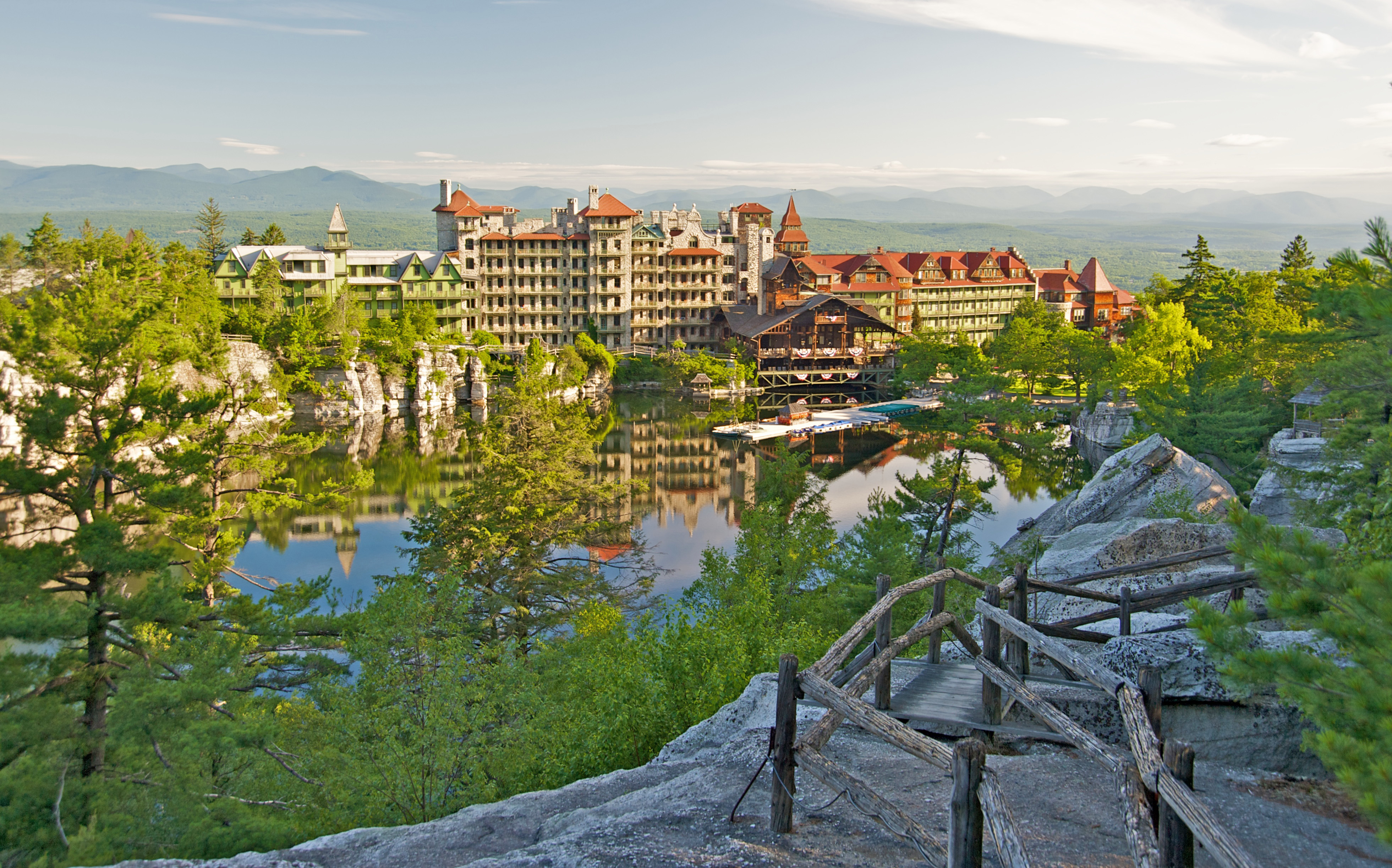
Mohonk Mountain House, a resort hotel located on the Shawangunk Ridge

Political and social accomplishments are represented by four former mental care institutions (a legacy of the state's leading role in mental health care), (Note: The four mental care institutions are: Utica State Hospital, Buffalo State Hospital, Hudson River State Hospital, and New York State Inebriate Asylum.) 14 sites associated with suffragettes or other women leaders, (Note: The fourteen sites associated with women leaders are: Susan B. Anthony House, Kate Mullany House, Petrified Sea Gardens, Elizabeth Cady Stanton House, Steepletop, Harriet Tubman House, Villa Lewaro, Vassar College Observatory, and six in NYC (Alice Austen House, Florence Mills House, Henry Street Settlement, Morris-Jumel Mansion, New York Studio School (building), and Margaret Sanger Clinic).) five Underground Railroad or other sites associated with abolitionists, (Note: The six abolitionist sites are: Boston Post Road Historic District, site of the Jay Property and John Jay's boyhood home, John Brown Farm and Gravesite, Lemuel Haynes House, Gerrit Smith Estate, Harriet Tubman House, and one in NYC (Plymouth Church of the Pilgrims).) six sites associated with African-American leaders, (Note: The six sites later associated with African-American leaders are: Villa Lewaro and five in NYC (Matthew Henson Residence, James Weldon Johnson Residence, Florence Mills House, New York Amsterdam News Building, and Paul Robeson Home).) three sites associated with labor rights, (Note: The three labor rights associated sites are: Kate Mullany House, and two in NYC (Triangle Shirtwaist Factory and Union Square)) and four sites associated with other social activism. (Note: The four other social activism sites in NYC are: Lower East Side Tenement National Historic Site, Henry Street Settlement, Margaret Sanger Clinic, and Stonewall.) In addition, there are 21 homes of other national leaders, (Note: The twenty-two homes of other national leaders are: Roscoe Conkling House, Millard Fillmore House, Gen. William Floyd House, John Jay Homestead, Boston Post Road Historic District which includes the childhood home of Founding Father John Jay as well as his final resting place Johnson Hall, Lindenwald, Thomas Paine Cottage, Elihu Root House, William Seward House, Gerrit Smith Estate, Top Cottage, Elkanah Watson House, and seven in NYC (Chester A. Arthur House, Ralph Johnson Bunche House, Hamilton Grange National Memorial, King Manor, Alfred E. Smith House, Gen. Winfield Scott House, and Samuel J. Tilden House).) and six government buildings that are significant on a national scale. (Note: The six government buildings are: New York State Capitol and five in NYC (New York City Hall, New York Surrogate's Court, Third Judicial District Courthouse, Tweed Courthouse, and the Alexander Hamilton U.S. Custom House).) Community, arts and entertainment accomplishments represented include two utopian communes, (Note: The two utopian communes are Mount Lebanon Shaker Society and Oneida Community Mansion House.) the Adirondack Park and four of its Great Camps, (Note: The Adirondack Park's four great camps are: Camp Pine Knot, Eagle Island Camp, Sagamore Camp, and Santanoni Preserve.) and five other retreat sites. (Note: The five other retreats are: Lewis Miller Cottage, Chautauqua Institution, Chautauqua Historic District, Lake Mohonk Mountain House, Saratoga Spa State Park, and Canfield Casino and Congress Park.) No fewer than nine artist homes or studios are landmarked, (Note: The nine artist studios are: Frederic E. Church House, Thomas Cole House, Roycroft Campus, Manitoga (Russel Wright Home), Thomas Moran House, William Sidney Mount House, Jackson Pollock House and Studio, and two in NYC (New York Studio School and Alice Austen House).) as well as nine homes of writers and composers. (Note: The nine writer/composer sites are: three associated with John Burroughs (Slabsides, Woodchuck Lodge, and John Burroughs' Riverby Study), Edgar Eggleston's Owl's Nest, Edna St. Vincent Millay's Steepletop, Washington Irving's Sunnyside, and four in NYC (Will Marion Cook House, Duke Ellington House, Claude McKay Residence, and John Philip Sousa House).) There are four club buildings, of which two are historical societies, (Note: The four clubs are: Buffalo and Erie County Historical Society Building, and three in NYC (Brooklyn Historical Society Building, New York Yacht Club Building, and Players Club).) and eight entertainment venues or sites associated with entertainers. (Note: The eight entertainment venues or entertainers are: Canfield Casino and Congress Park, Elephant Hotel, Historic Track, Kleinhans Music Hall, Playland Amusement Park, and three in NYC (Carnegie Hall, Florence Mills House, and Jackie Robinson House).) Sixteen others are unique sites that are difficult to classify. (Note: The sixteen sites not elsewhere categorized are: Armour-Stiner House, Holland Land Office, Old House, Palisades Interstate Park, and 12 in NYC (Cooper Union, Dakota Apartments, Governors Island, Grand Central Station, Merchants House Museum, Metropolitan Museum of Art, New York Public Library Main Branch, Plaza Hotel, United Charities Building, Rockefeller Center, and Sailors' Snug Harbor).)

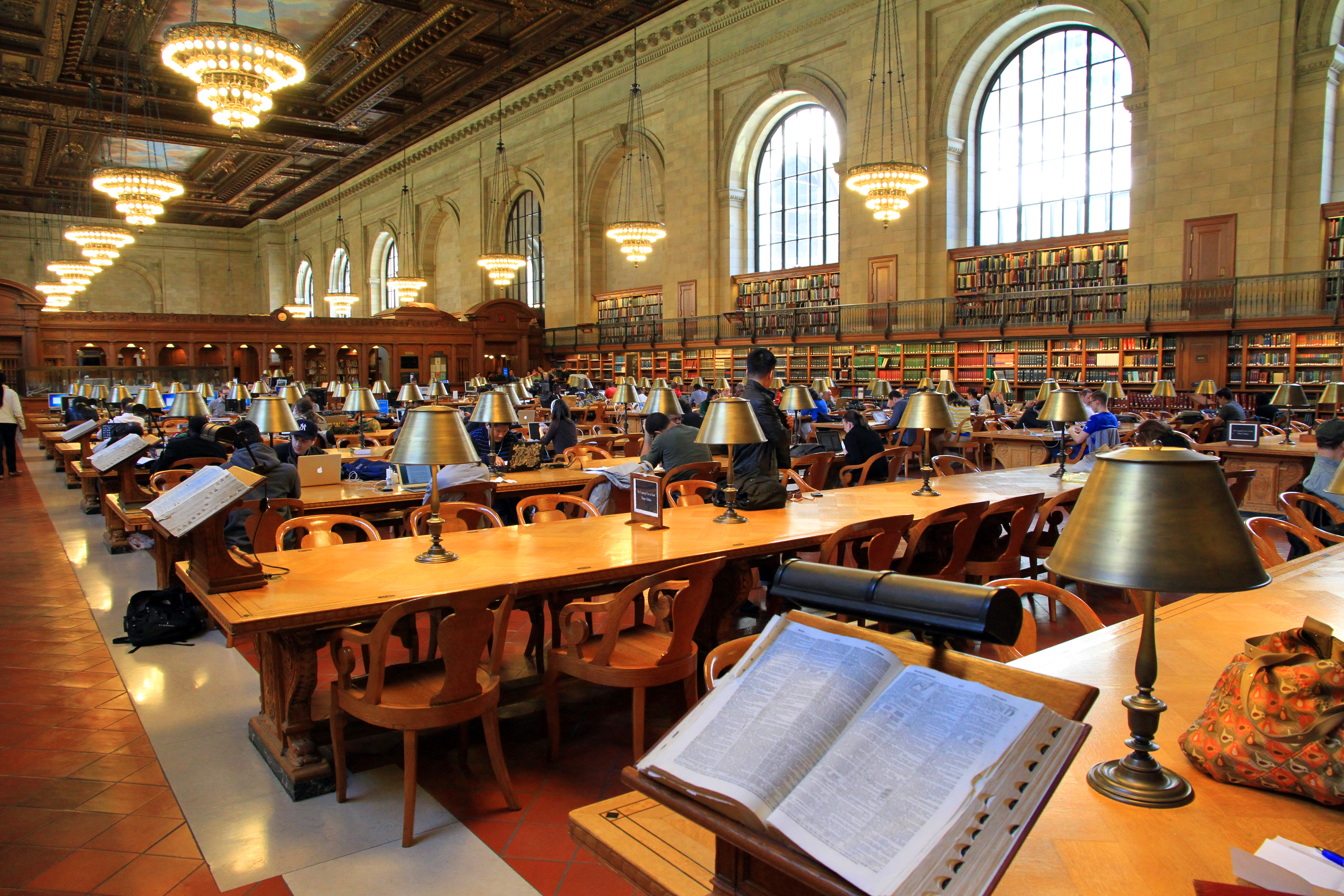
New York Public Library Main Branch

Notable architects whose work is represented in the NHLs of the state include: Alexander Jackson Davis (7 sites), (Note: Architect Alexander Jackson Davis designed (or contributed to the design of) a mansion in the Boston Post Road Historic District, Dr. Oliver Bronson House and Estate, Dutch Reformed Church (Newburgh, New York), Lyndhurst (Jay Gould Estate), Montgomery Place, Locust Grove (Samuel F. B. Morse House), and Utica Psychiatric Center.) Andrew Jackson Downing (2), (Note: Andrew Jackson Downing designed Springside (Matthew Vassar Estate) and Utica State Hospital.) William West Durant (2), (Note: William West Durant designed Camp Pine Knot and Sagamore Camp.) Leopold Eidlitz (2), (Note: Leopold Eidlitz designed New York State Capitol and Tweed Courthouse.) Cass Gilbert (3), (Note: Cass Gilbert designed New York Life Building, Woolworth Building, and the Alexander Hamilton U.S. Custom House.) Henry J. Hardenbergh (2), (Note: Henry J. Hardenbergh designed The Dakota and Plaza Hotel.) Raymond Hood (3), (Note: Raymond Hood designed Daily News Building, McGraw Hill Building, and Rockefeller Center.) Philip Hooker (2), (Note: Philip Hooker designed Hyde Hall and Roscoe Conkling House.) Minard Lafever (7), (Note: Minard Lafever designed a mansion within Boston Post Road Historic District, First Presbyterian Church (Sag Harbor), First Reformed Protestant Dutch Church of Kingston, Old Merchant's House, Rose Hill (Fayette), Sailors Snug Harbor, and St. Ann and the Holy Trinity Church.) John McComb Jr. (3), (Note: John McComb Jr., designed Hamilton Grange, New York City Hall, and Quarters A, Brooklyn Navy Yard.) Frederick Law Olmsted (3), (Note: Frederick Law Olmsted designed Central Park, Buffalo State Hospital, and Hudson River State Hospital.) Isaac G. Perry (2), (Note: Isaac G. Perry designed New York State Capitol and New York State Inebriate Asylum.) George B. Post (3), (Note: George B. Post designed Brooklyn Historical Society Building, New York Stock Exchange Building, and Troy Savings Bank.) James Renwick Jr. (4), (Note: James Renwick Jr., designed Grace Church, New York, Main Building (Vassar College), New York Stock Exchange Building, and St. Patrick's Cathedral, New York.) Henry Hobson Richardson (2), (Note: Henry Hobson Richardson originated the Richardsonian Romanesque style with Buffalo State Hospital and also contributed to the design of New York State Capitol.) Louis Sullivan (2), (Note: Louis Sullivan designed Guaranty Building and Bayard-Condict Building.) Richard Upjohn (6), (Note: Richard Upjohn designed Church of the Ascension (New York), part of Green-Wood Cemetery, Lindenwald, St. Paul's Cathedral (Buffalo), St. Peter's Episcopal Church (Albany, New York), and Trinity Church.) Calvert Vaux (6), (Note: Calvert Vaux designed Central Park, Frederic E. Church House, Hudson River State Hospital, Metropolitan Art Museum, Third Judicial District Courthouse, and Samuel J. Tilden House.) and Frederick Clarke Withers (2). (Note: Frederick Clarke Withers designed Hudson River State Hospital and Third Judicial District Courthouse.) The firm McKim, Mead, and White participated in design of at least six buildings later declared to be NHLs. (Note: McKim, Mead, and White designed Metropolitan Art Museum, National City Bank Building, Pierpont Morgan Library, Low Memorial Library, Philosophy Hall, and Tiffany and Company Building.) It was also that firm's work, Pennsylvania Station, whose pending demolition in 1963 launched a historic preservation movement in New York City and led to creation of the New York City Landmarks Preservation Commission in 1965.

== Current National Historic Landmarks in Upstate and Long Island ==
The State of New York, exclusive of NYC, is home to 155 of these landmarks, which are tabulated here. Twenty-three of these are also State Historic Sites (SHS), and fourteen are National Park System areas; these designations are indicated in italics.

== Key ==
	National Historic Landmark
^{†}	National Historic Landmark District
^{∞}	National Memorial
^{*}	National Historic Site
	National Monument
	National Historical Park
	Delisted landmark

	Landmark name	Image	Date designated	Location	County	Description
1	Adams Power Plant Transformer House	Adams Power Plant Transformer House	May 4, 1983 (#75001212)	Niagara Falls; 43°04′54″N 79°02′34″W	Niagara	Transformer house of the first large-scale, alternating current electric generating plant in the world; tapped power of Niagara Falls via a 7,500 foot (2,286 m) tail-race tunnel
2	Adirondack Forest Preserve	Adirondack Forest Preserve	May 23, 1963 (#66000891)	Northeastern Upstate New York; 43°47′13″N 74°29′06″W	All of Essex and Hamilton and parts of Clinton, Franklin, Fulton, Herkimer, Lewis, Oneida, St. Lawrence, Saratoga, Warren, and Washington	Largest publicly protected area in the lower 48 United States; largest National Historic Landmark; largest and one of earliest areas protected by any state; established in 1885; later protected in "forever wild" section of New York state constitution
3	Susan B. Anthony House	Susan B. Anthony House	May 23, 1965 (#66000528)	Rochester; 43°09′12″N 77°37′33″W	Monroe	Home of Susan B. Anthony, prominent 19th century women's rights activist
4	Armour-Stiner House	Armour-Stiner House	December 8, 1976 (#75001238)	Irvington; 41°01′51″N 73°52′13″W	Westchester	Octagonal implementation of architectural ideas of Orson Squire Fowler
5	Bennington Battlefield	Bennington Battlefield	January 20, 1961 (#66000564)	Walloomsac; 42°56′19″N 73°18′16″W	Rensselaer	Site of Battle of Bennington, where the American defeat of a British foraging party of dragoons helped assure the Continental Army's pivotal victory at Saratoga
6^{†}	Boston Post Road Historic District	Boston Post Road Historic District	August 30, 1993 (#82001275)	Rye; 40°57′31″N 73°42′07″W	Westchester	Three mansions and associated grounds with pre-contact archaeological significance; 5 contributing properties include the 23-acre Jay Estate, childhood home of Founding Father John Jay, Lounsberry, Rye Golf Club home of Whitby Castle, the private Jay Cemetery, final resting place of John Jay and his descendants, and Marshlands Conservancy, a nature preserve running from Boston Post Road down to the Long Island Sound, an area essentially unchanged for 200 years
7	Boughton Hill (Gannagaro)	Boughton Hill (Gannagaro)	July 19, 1964 (#66000559)	Victor; 42°57′40″N 77°24′46″W	Ontario	The site of a 17th-century Seneca village known as the Town of Peace and birthplace of the Iroquois Confederacy
8	Bronck House	Bronck House	December 24, 1967 (#67000012)	Coxsackie; 42°20′31″N 73°50′55″W	Greene	Oldest structure in upstate New York; excellent example of Dutch colonial architecture
9	Dr. Oliver Bronson House and Estate	Dr. Oliver Bronson House and Estate	July 31, 2003 (#03001035)	Hudson; 42°14′35″N 73°47′09″W	Columbia	Early example of the Hudson River bracketed style of Alexander Jackson Davis
10	John Brown Farm and Gravesite	John Brown Farm and Gravesite	August 5, 1998 (#72000840)	Lake Placid; 44°15′20″N 73°58′15″W	Essex	Home and final resting place of famous abolitionist John Brown, executed for his raid on Harper's Ferry Armory before the Civil War
11	Buffalo and Erie County Historic Society Building	Buffalo and Erie County Historic Society Building	February 27, 1987 (#80002606)	Buffalo; 42°56′08″N 78°52′36″W	Erie	Parthenon-evoking legacy of the 1901 Pan-American Exposition; turned over to historical society afterwards
12	Buffalo State Hospital	Buffalo State Hospital	June 24, 1986 (#86003557)	Buffalo; 42°55′46″N 78°52′56″W	Erie	Architect H. H. Richardson's largest commission; advent of his characteristic Richardsonian Romanesque style; used to care for the mentally ill; grounds designed by Frederick Law Olmsted
13	John Burroughs' Riverby Study	John Burroughs' Riverby Study	October 18, 1968 (#68000035)	West Park; 41°48′00″N 73°57′32″W	Ulster	Small frame structure built in 1881 by naturalist John Burroughs as a writing retreat; in this study, that looks east over the Hudson River, Burroughs wrote Fresh Fields (1884), Signs and Seasons (1886), Indoor Studies (1889), and Riverby (1894)
14	Camp Pine Knot	Camp Pine Knot	August 18, 2004 (#86002934)	Raquette Lake; 43°49′17″N 74°37′34″W	Hamilton	First of the Adirondack Great Camps; designed and built by William West Durant
15	Camp Uncas	Camp Uncas	October 6, 2008 (#86002937)	Raquette Lake; 43°44′38″N 74°38′53″W	Hamilton	Second of the Adirondack Great Camps; designed and built by William West Durant
16	Canfield Casino and Congress Park	Canfield Casino and Congress Park	February 27, 1987 (#87000904)	Saratoga Springs; 43°04′45″N 73°46′58″W	Saratoga	Former resort and casino; now houses the Saratoga Springs History Museum
17^{†}	Chautauqua Historic District	Chautauqua Historic District	June 29, 1989 (#73001168)	Chautauqua; 42°12′35″N 79°28′01″W	Chautauqua	Adult education and summer retreat; focuses on programs related to arts, education, religion and recreation; well-preserved 19th century architecture
18	Christeen (sloop)	Christeen (sloop)	December 4, 1991 (#91002060)	Oyster Bay; 40°52′40″N 73°32′23″W	Nassau	Oldest oyster sloop in the U.S.
19	Frederick E. Church House	Frederick E. Church House	June 22, 1965 (#66000509)	Hudson; 42°13′03″N 73°49′07″W	Columbia	Calvert Vaux-designed home of Hudson River School painter Frederic Edwin Church; also known as Olana
20	Clermont	Clermont	November 28, 1972 (#71000535)	Clermont; 42°05′09″N 73°55′09″W	Columbia	Ancestral home of the Livingston family, prominent in colonial and early New York; known also as Clermont Manor
21^{†}	Cobblestone Historic District	Cobblestone Historic District	April 19, 1993 (#93001603)	Gaines; 43°17′16″N 78°10′54″W	Orleans	Three buildings: a First Universalist Church, the Ward House, and schoolhouse exemplifying 19th-century U.S. cobblestone architecture at its highest
22^{#}	Thomas Cole House	Thomas Cole House	June 23, 1965 (#66000522)	Catskill; 42°13′35″N 73°51′43″W	Greene	Home and studio of painter Thomas Cole, founder of the Hudson River School of American painting
23^{†}	Colonial Niagara Historic District	Colonial Niagara Historic District	October 9, 1960 (#66000556)	Youngstown; 43°15′42″N 79°03′49″W	Niagara	Originally built by British during French and Indian War; served as US post in War of 1812 until retaken by British; ceded back at war's end
24	Columbia (Steamer)	Columbia (Steamer)	July 6, 1992 (#79001171)	Buffalo; 42°51′39″N 78°51′44″W	Erie	This passenger steamship carried passengers to Bois Blanc Island for the Detroit & Windsor Ferry Company, and is one of the last remaining examples of her kind. Designed by Frank E. Kirby, noted naval architect. In September 2015, it was moved to Buffalo, New York, where it is being prepared for an eventual move to the Hudson River.
25	Roscoe Conkling House	Roscoe Conkling House	May 15, 1975 (#75001214)	Utica; 43°05′46″N 75°13′47″W	Oneida	Home of Roscoe Conkling, divisive U.S. senator in years after Civil War; leader of Stalwart faction of Republican Party; contributor to atmosphere that led to the assassination of James Garfield
26	Aaron Copland House	Aaron Copland House	October 6, 2008 (#03000245)	Cortlandt Manor; 41°14′24″N 73°54′09″W	Westchester	Home of composer Aaron Copland for last 30 years of his life
27	Croton Aqueduct (Old)	Croton Aqueduct (Old)	April 27, 1992 (#74001324)	Croton River to Manhattan; 41°13′35″N 73°51′19″W	Westchester, Bronx	Large and complex water supply system for New York City; constructed between 1837 and 1842
28	Davis-Ferris Organ	Davis-Ferris Organ	December 23, 2016 (#100000864)	Round Lake; 42°56′12″N 73°47′38″W	Saratoga	Oldest three-manual organ in the nation.
29	De Wint House	De Wint House	May 23, 1966 (#66000568)	Tappan; 41°01′11″N 73°56′48″W	Rockland	Oldest building in Rockland County; outstanding example of Dutch colonial architecture; used by George Washington as headquarters during final negotiations for British withdrawal from New York City
30	Delaware and Hudson Canal	Delaware and Hudson Canal	October 18, 1968 (#68000051)	Kingston, NY, Rosendale, NY, Ellenville, NY, Port Jervis, NY, Lackawaxen, PA and Honesdale, PA; 41°36′26″N 74°26′53″W	Orange, NY, Sullivan, NY, Ulster, NY, Pike, PA and Wayne, PA	Vital coal supply line for New York City in 19th century; shared with Pennsylvania
31	John William Draper House	John William Draper House	May 15, 1975 (#75001237)	Hastings-on-Hudson; 40°59′24″N 73°52′48″W	Westchester	Building mistakenly thought to be the home of scientist John William Draper; it was actually the home of his son, the astrophotography pioneer Henry Draper, the first person to photograph the Moon with recognizable surface features.
32	Dutch Reformed Church	Dutch Reformed Church	November 5, 1961 (#66000581)	Sleepy Hollow; 41°05′25″N 73°51′43″W	Westchester	Oldest church building in state dates to 1685; figures prominently in Washington Irving's "The Legend of Sleepy Hollow"
33	Dutch Reformed Church, Newburgh	Dutch Reformed Church, Newburgh	August 7, 2001 (#70000425)	Newburgh; 41°30′16″N 74°00′32″W	Orange	Church designed by Alexander Jackson Davis in 1835 in the Greek Revival style
34	Eagle Island Camp	Eagle Island Camp	August 18, 2004 (#86002941)	Saranac Inn; 44°16′28″N 74°19′57″W	Franklin	One of the original Adirondack Great Camps, on Upper Saranac Lake; used as a Girl Scout camp today
35	Gardner Earl Memorial Chapel and Crematorium	Gardner Earl Memorial Chapel and Crematorium	March 2, 2012 (#04000091)	Troy; 42°45′20″N 73°40′17″W	Rensselaer	Late 1880s Richardsonian Romanesque structure influenced design of many later memorial chapels.
36	George Eastman House	George Eastman House	November 13, 1966 (#66000529)	Rochester; 43°09′08″N 77°34′49″W	Monroe	The home of George Eastman, founder of Kodak, now an internationally known photography museum
37	Edward M. Cotter	Edward M. Cotter	June 28, 1996 (#96000968)	Buffalo; 42°52′20″N 78°52′22″W	Erie	In use for 107 years; oldest active fireboat in the world
38	Elephant Hotel	Elephant Hotel	April 5, 2005 (#05000462)	Somers; 41°19′37″N 73°41′13″W	Westchester	"Cradle of the American circus" when it was used as headquarters by Hachaliah Bailey in the 1830s; today serves as both a museum and Somers Town Hall
39	Erie Canal	Erie Canal	October 9, 1960 (#66000530)	Glen and Florida; 42°56′23″N 74°17′11″W	Montgomery	Aqueduct for Erie Canal over Schoharie Creek
40	Millard Fillmore House	Millard Fillmore House	May 30, 1974 (#74001235)	East Aurora; 42°46′06″N 78°37′21″W	Erie	Only surviving home of 13th U.S. President Millard Fillmore, besides the White House
41	Fire Fighter (fireboat)	Fire Fighter (fireboat)	June 30, 1989 (#89001447)	Greenport; 41°05′59″N 72°21′41″W	Suffolk	Originally listed in New York City, since moved to Greenport
42	First Presbyterian Church (Old Whalers)	First Presbyterian Church (Old Whalers)	April 19, 1994 (#94001194)	Sag Harbor; 40°59′50″N 72°17′39″W	Suffolk	Egyptian Revival style church
43	First Reformed Protestant Dutch Church of Kingston	First Reformed Protestant Dutch Church of Kingston	October 6, 2008 (#08001089)	Kingston; 41°55′58″N 74°01′08″W	Ulster	1850 "Old Dutch Church" is third home to congregation established in 1659. Nearby graves include George Clinton. One of the few Minard Lefever churches whose original steeple has survived. His only intact Renaissance Revival church, and his only known one in stone.
44	Gen. William Floyd House	Gen. William Floyd House	June 17, 1971 (#71000549)	Westernville; 43°18′22″N 75°23′02″W	Oneida	Upstate home of William Floyd, a signer of the Declaration of Independence
45	Fort Corchaug Archeological Site	Fort Corchaug Archeological Site	January 20, 1999 (#74001308)	Southold; 41°00′10″N 72°29′55″W	Suffolk	Site of a Native American fort
46	Fort Crailo	Fort Crailo	November 5, 1961 (#66000563)	Rensselaer; 42°38′08″N 73°44′59″W	Rensselaer	Dutch colonial patroonship house; may be place where "Yankee Doodle" was written
47	Fort Crown Point	Fort Crown Point	October 18, 1968 (#68000033)	Crown Point; 44°01′45″N 73°25′52″W	Essex	Built by British to secure Lake Champlain against French in mid-18th century
48	Fort Johnson	Fort Johnson	November 28, 1972 (#72000858)	Fort Johnson; 42°57′26″N 74°14′30″W	Montgomery	Home of Sir William Johnson, and later his son Sir John Johnson.
49	Fort Klock	Fort Klock	November 28, 1972 (#72000859)	St. Johnsville; 42°59′06″N 74°39′01″W	Montgomery	Mid-18th century fortified stone homestead in the Mohawk River Valley
50	Fort Massapeag Archeological Site	Fort Massapeag Archeological Site	April 19, 1993 (#93000610)	Massapequa; 40°39′11″N 73°27′40″W	Nassau	Archaeological site in town of Oyster Bay, New York
51	Fort Montgomery	Fort Montgomery	November 28, 1972 (#72000897)	Highlands; 41°19′26″N 73°59′13″W	Orange	Built by Continental Army in an attempt to control Hudson River; later taken and destroyed by the British
52	Fort Orange Archeological Site	Fort Orange Archeological Site	November 4, 1993 (#93001620)	Albany; 42°38′41″N 73°45′01″W	Albany	Archaeological site at first permanent Dutch settlement in New Netherland
53	Fort St. Frédéric	Fort St. Frédéric	October 9, 1960 (#66000517)	Crown Point; 44°01′49″N 73°25′34″W	Essex	Mostly destroyed by French forces in French and Indian War; British built Fort Crown Point next to its ruins
54^{#}	Fort Stanwix	Fort Stanwix	November 23, 1962 (#66000057)	Rome; 43°12′38″N 75°27′19″W	Oneida	Modern reconstruction of colonial fort on original site
55	Fort Ticonderoga	Fort Ticonderoga	October 9, 1960 (#66000519)	Ticonderoga; 43°50′29″N 73°23′17″W	Essex	Site of important battles in both French and Indian War and American Revolution
56	General Electric Research Laboratory	General Electric Research Laboratory	May 15, 1975 (#75001227)	Schenectady; 42°48′39″N 73°57′06″W	Schenectady	First industrial research facility in the U.S.
57^{†}	Geneseo Historic District	Geneseo Historic District	July 17, 1991 (#77000948)	Geneseo; 42°47′46″N 77°49′00″W	Livingston	Well-preserved 19th century upstate village
58	Jay Gould Estate	Jay Gould Estate	November 13, 1966 (#66000582)	Tarrytown; 41°03′21″N 73°51′55″W	Westchester	Alexander Jackson Davis-designed Gothic Revival mansion named Lyndhurst; became home to rail baron Jay Gould
59	Grant Cottage	Grant Cottage	January 13, 2021 (#100006247)	CR 101 north of US 9; 43°12′03″N 73°44′45″W	Saratoga	Cottage first owned by banker Joseph W. Drexel. It was the site where Ulysses S. Grant died in 1885.
60	W. & L. E. Gurley Building	W. & L. E. Gurley Building	May 4, 1983 (#70000432)	Troy; 42°43′56″N 73°41′13″W	Rensselaer	Classical Revival structure; built in 1862; housed the W. & L. E. Gurley Company, a maker of precision measuring instruments
61	James Hall Office	James Hall Office	December 8, 1976 (#76001204)	Albany; 42°38′45″N 73°46′09″W	Albany	Office of paleontologist James Hall, a leader in research on the geology of North America during the 19th century; designed by Vaux and Olmsted
62^{†}	Harmony Mills	Harmony Mills	January 20, 1999 (#78003151)	Cohoes; 42°46′53″N 73°42′16″W	Albany	Largest cotton mill complex in the world when it opened in 1872; one of the finest examples of a large-scale textile mill complex outside New England
63	E.H. Harriman Estate	E.H. Harriman Estate	November 13, 1966 (#66000561)	Harriman; 41°17′48″N 74°07′09″W	Orange	Estate of railroad magnate Edward Harriman; also known as Arden
64	John A. Hartford House	John A. Hartford House	December 22, 1977 (#77000987)	Valhalla; 41°04′07″N 73°47′26″W	Westchester	Home of John Hartford, whose family built A&P into the first nationwide retail chain
65	Jean Hasbrouck House	Jean Hasbrouck House	December 24, 1967 (#67000016)	New Paltz; 41°45′03″N 74°05′19″W	Ulster	Early eighteenth century example of Hudson Valley Dutch architecture; located within the Huguenot Street Historic District
66	Lemuel Haynes House	Lemuel Haynes House	May 15, 1975 (#75001235)	South Granville; 43°22′16″N 73°17′00″W	Washington	Last home of Lemuel Haynes, first African-American preacher ordained in America.
67	Historic Track	Historic Track	May 23, 1966 (#66000560)	Goshen; 41°24′08″N 74°19′10″W	Orange	Oldest continuously operated horse racing facility in U.S.
68	Holland Land Office	Holland Land Office	October 9, 1960 (#66000521)	Batavia; 42°59′55″N 78°11′21″W	Genesee	Main office of Holland Land Company, early owners of Western New York.
69	Franklin B. Hough House	Franklin B. Hough House	May 23, 1963 (#66000526)	Lowville; 43°47′18″N 75°30′00″W	Lewis	Home of Franklin Hough, considered the father of American forestry
70^{†}	Hudson River Historic District	Hudson River Historic District	December 14, 1990 (#90002219)	East bank of river between Staatsburg and Germantown; 41°55′13″N 73°56′12″W	Dutchess and Columbia	View of Catskills across river from here inspired Hudson River School artists; small towns with much land use and architecture preserved from past eras
71	Hudson River State Hospital, Main Building	Hudson River State Hospital, Main Building	June 30, 1989 (#89001166)	Poughkeepsie; 41°43′59″N 73°55′41″W	Dutchess	Frederick Clarke Withers-designed first institutional building in the U.S. in High Victorian Gothic style. Grounds designed by Frederick Law Olmsted and Calvert Vaux
72^{†}	Huguenot Street Historic District	Huguenot Street Historic District	October 9, 1960 (#66000578)	New Paltz; 41°45′00″N 74°05′21″W	Ulster	One of the oldest continuously inhabited neighborhoods in the current United States of America (Taos Pueblo is another)
73^{†}	Hurley Historic District	Hurley Historic District	November 5, 1961 (#66000577)	Hurley; 41°55′32″N 74°03′49″W	Ulster	Ten stone Dutch Colonial houses; served as the capitol of NY for two months during the American Revolution
74	Hyde Hall	Hyde Hall	June 24, 1986 (#71000555)	Glimmerglass State Park; 42°47′32″N 74°52′08″W	Otsego	One of the finest American houses that combines the architectural traditions of England and America; one of the few surviving works of Philip Hooker.
75	John Jay Homestead	John Jay Homestead	May 29, 1981 (#72000918)	Katonah; 41°15′05″N 73°39′36″W	Westchester	Home of John Jay, first Chief Justice of the United States
76	Johnson Hall	Johnson Hall	October 9, 1960 (#66000520)	Johnstown; 43°00′58″N 74°23′00″W	Fulton	Later home of Sir William Johnson; Johnson Hall was seized by the rebel government during the American Revolution and was subsequently acquired by Silas Talbot.
77	Kleinhans Music Hall	Kleinhans Music Hall	June 30, 1989 (#89001235)	Buffalo; 42°54′07″N 78°53′01″W	Erie	Home of the Buffalo Philharmonic Orchestra, designed by Eliel and Eero Saarinen.
78	Knox Headquarters	Knox Headquarters	November 28, 1972 (#72000901)	Vails Gate; 41°27′18″N 74°03′00″W	Orange	Headquarters of Gen. Henry Knox during the American Revolution
79	Lake Mohonk Mountain House	Lake Mohonk Mountain House	June 24, 1986 (#73001280)	New Paltz; 41°46′07″N 74°09′20″W	Ulster	Distinctive resort on Shawangunk Ridge; site of 1895–1916 conference that led to establishment of Permanent Court of Arbitration at The Hague
80	Lamoka	Lamoka	January 20, 1961 (#66000571)	Tyrone; Address Restricted	Schuyler	First archeological evidence of an Archaic (c. 3,500 BCE) hunter-gatherer culture in the U.S.
81	Land Tortoise (radeau)		August 5, 1998 (#95000819)	Bottom of Lake George; 43°25′16″N 73°42′30″W	Warren	Only known surviving radeau (simple flat-bottomed ship with cannon), sunk under 100 feet (30 m) of water during French and Indian War
82	Irving Langmuir House	Irving Langmuir House	January 7, 1976 (#76001275)	Schenectady; 42°48′58″N 73°55′09″W	Schenectady	Home of physicist-chemist Irving Langmuir, winner of the 1932 Nobel Prize during his research career with General Electric
83^{#}	Lindenwald	Lindenwald	July 4, 1961 (#66000510)	Kinderhook; 42°22′11″N 73°42′15″W	Columbia	Home of U.S. President Martin Van Buren; designed in part by Richard Upjohn
84	Manitoga (Russel Wright House and Studio)	Manitoga (Russel Wright House and Studio)	February 17, 2006 (#96001269)	Garrison; 41°20′55″N 73°57′04″W	Putnam	House and studio of industrial designer Russel Wright. Designed by Wright and his wife to be sustainable and blend in with surrounding environment
85	Darwin D. Martin House	Darwin D. Martin House	February 24, 1986 (#86000160)	Buffalo; 42°55′52″N 78°50′29″W	Erie	Considered the most important building of architect Frank Lloyd Wright's early career.
86	Lewis Miller Cottage, Chautauqua Institution	Lewis Miller Cottage, Chautauqua Institution	December 21, 1965 (#66000506)	Chautauqua; 42°12′37″N 79°27′53″W	Chautauqua	Home of Lewis Miller, founder of Chautauqua Institution, located on grounds
87	Edna St. Vincent Millay House (Steepletop)	Edna St. Vincent Millay House (Steepletop)	November 11, 1971 (#71000534)	Austerlitz; 42°19′13″N 73°26′52″W	Columbia	Home of Pulitzer Prize-winning poet Edna St. Vincent Millay
88	Modesty (sloop)	Modesty (sloop)	August 7, 2001 (#01001051)	West Sayville; 40°43′22″N 73°05′43″W	Suffolk	Example of a Long Island oyster dredging sloop, and only extant one that operated purely on sail power
89^{†}	Mohawk Upper Castle Historic District	Mohawk Upper Castle Historic District	November 4, 1993 (#93001621)	Danube; 43°00′10″N 74°46′40″W	Herkimer	Historic district including the Indian Castle Church as well as archaeological site areas
90	Montauk Point Light	Montauk Point Light	March 2, 2012 (#69000142)	East Hampton; 41°04′15″N 71°51′26″W	Suffolk	Built in 1797, oldest lighthouse in New York and fourth-oldest in country
91	Montgomery Place	Montgomery Place	April 8, 1992 (#75001184)	Annandale; 42°00′52″N 73°55′08″W	Dutchess	Federal-style house, with expansion designed by architect Alexander Jackson Davis
92	Thomas Moran House	Thomas Moran House	December 21, 1965 (#66000574)	East Hampton; 40°57′14″N 72°11′40″W	Suffolk	Home of the Hudson River School painter Thomas Moran who helped inspire the creation of the National Park system
93	Morrill Hall, Cornell University	Morrill Hall, Cornell University	December 21, 1965 (#66000576)	Ithaca; 42°26′55″N 76°29′08″W	Tompkins	First building of Cornell University
94	Samuel F. B. Morse House	Samuel F. B. Morse House	January 29, 1964 (#66000515)	Poughkeepsie; 41°37′51″N 73°55′10″W	Dutchess	Home of telegraph inventor Samuel F. B. Morse in his later years; preserved by subsequent owners
95	Mount Lebanon Shaker Society	Mount Lebanon Shaker Society	June 23, 1965 (#66000511)	New Lebanon; 42°27′09″N 73°22′50″W	Columbia	Main Shaker community established in U.S.
96	William Sidney Mount House	William Sidney Mount House	December 21, 1965 (#66000575)	Stony Brook; 40°54′27″N 73°08′18″W	Suffolk	Home and studio of painter William Sidney Mount
97^{#}	Kate Mullany House	Kate Mullany House	April 1, 1998 (#98000453)	Troy; 42°44′24″N 73°40′54″W	Rensselaer	Home of Kate Mullany, early female labor organizer and founder of Collar Laundry Union
98	Nash (harbor tug)	Nash (harbor tug)	December 4, 1991 (#91002059)	Oswego; 43°27′49″N 76°30′56″W	Oswego	Last surviving U.S. Army vessel that participated in World War II's D-Day Normandy landing
99	New York State Barge Canal	New York State Barge Canal	December 23, 2016 (#100000834)	42°47′12″N 73°40′44″W	Albany, Erie, Herkimer, Madison, Monroe, Montgomery, Niagara, Oneida, Onondaga, Orleans, Oswego, Rensselaer, Saratoga, Schenectady, Seneca, Washington, Wayne	
100	New York State Capitol	New York State Capitol	January 29, 1979 (#71000519)	Albany; 42°39′09″N 73°45′26″W	Albany	Built in two different architectural styles; one of ten U.S. state capitol buildings without a dome
101	New York State Inebriate Asylum	New York State Inebriate Asylum	December 9, 1997 (#96000814)	Binghamton; 42°06′23″N 75°51′57″W	Broome	First hospital built to treat alcoholism and view it as a medical problem rather than a character flaw
102	Newtown Battlefield	Newtown Battlefield	November 28, 1972 (#72000826)	Elmira; 42°02′43″N 76°44′00″W	Chemung	Site of only major battle of the Sullivan Expedition, a decisive victory by General John Sullivan over of Loyalist-Indian forces led by Joseph Brant, in August 1779
103	Niagara Reservation	Niagara Reservation	May 23, 1963 (#66000555)	Niagara Falls; 43°05′N 79°04′W	Niagara	Oldest U.S. state park (1885); built around U.S. side of Niagara Falls
104	Nott Memorial Hall	Nott Memorial Hall	June 24, 1986 (#72000912)	Schenectady; 42°49′02″N 73°55′49″W	Schenectady	Sixteen-sided building on Union College campus considered outstanding example of Victorian Gothic architecture
105	Old House	Old House	November 5, 1961 (#66000573)	Cutchogue; 41°00′30″N 72°29′08″W	Suffolk	Built in 1649; asserted to be "one of the finest surviving examples of English domestic architecture in America"
106	Old Main, Vassar College	Old Main, Vassar College	June 24, 1986 (#73001183)	Poughkeepsie; 41°41′12″N 73°53′45″W	Dutchess	Second Empire building was the second building of one of America's first women's colleges
107	Oneida Community Mansion House	Oneida Community Mansion House	June 23, 1965 (#66000527)	Oneida; 43°03′37″N 75°36′19″W	Madison	Built in 1848 for the Oneida Community
108	Oriskany Battlefield	Oriskany Battlefield	November 23, 1962 (#66000558)	Oriskany; 43°10′38″N 75°22′10″W	Oneida	Local militias held off pro-British Indians and Loyalists in Battle of Oriskany, one of the few battles of the Revolutionary War in which all participants were natives of North America
109	Owl's Nest	Owl's Nest	November 11, 1971 (#71000565)	Lake George; 43°26′41″N 73°39′18″W	Warren	Home of author Edward Eggleston, one of America's first realist novelists
110	Thomas Paine Cottage	Thomas Paine Cottage	November 28, 1972 (#72000920)	New Rochelle; 40°56′11″N 73°47′12″W	Westchester	Home and gravesite of Thomas Paine, author of Common Sense
111	Palisades Interstate Park	Palisades Interstate Park	January 12, 1965 (#66000890)	Hudson River western shoreline; shared with New Jersey; 40°57′11″N 73°55′52″W	Rockland, NY, Orange County, NY, and Bergen, NJ	Joint effort by two states to preserve scenic beauty of west Hudson Palisades and protect them from development and quarrying
112^{†}	Petrified Sea Gardens	Petrified Sea Gardens	January 20, 1999 (#99000631)	Saratoga Springs; 43°04′59″N 73°50′40″W	Saratoga	First stromatolites in North America discovered here; fossils of marine algae were fully described by pioneering female paleontologist Winifred Goldring
113	Philipsburg Manor House	Philipsburg Manor House	November 5, 1961 (#66000584)	Sleepy Hollow; 41°05′26″N 73°51′55″W	Westchester	Historic house, water mill, and trading site; at one time, one of the largest slave holdings in the colonial North
114	Philipse Manor Hall	Philipse Manor Hall	November 5, 1961 (#66000585)	Yonkers; 40°56′08″N 73°53′59″W	Westchester	Historic house museum; Westchester County's oldest standing building
115	Plattsburgh Bay	Plattsburgh Bay	December 19, 1960 (#66000507)	Lake Champlain; 44°41′33″N 73°22′34″W	Clinton	Site of Battle of Plattsburgh, where U.S. land and naval forces repulsed the last foreign invasion attempt on the northern states during the War of 1812
116	Playland Amusement Park	Playland Amusement Park	February 27, 1987 (#80004529)	Rye; 40°57′57″N 73°40′26″W	Westchester	The only publicly owned amusement park in the U.S.; rides and attractions were designed in the Art Deco style
117	Jackson Pollock House and Studio	Jackson Pollock House and Studio	April 19, 1994 (#94001193)	East Hampton; 41°01′26″N 72°09′18″W	Suffolk	Home and studio of painter Jackson Pollock and his wife Lee Krasner beginning in 1945
118	Priscilla (sloop)	Priscilla (sloop)	February 17, 2006 (#06000238)	West Sayville; 40°43′22″N 73°05′43″W	Suffolk	Example of a classic Long Island oyster dredging sloop
119	Prudential (Guaranty) Building	Prudential (Guaranty) Building	May 15, 1975 (#73001187)	Buffalo; 42°52′58″N 78°52′36″W	Erie	Early skyscraper design; collaboration between Louis Sullivan and Dankmar Adler
120	John D. Rockefeller Estate	John D. Rockefeller Estate	May 11, 1976 (#76001290)	Pocantico Hills; 41°05′23″N 73°50′40″W	Westchester	Estate of the oil tycoons, the Rockefeller family; also known as Kykuit
121	Elihu Root House	Elihu Root House	November 28, 1972 (#72000893)	Clinton; 43°02′59″N 75°24′18″W	Oneida	Home of Elihu Root, U.S. Senator, Secretary of War, Secretary of State, and recipient of the 1912 Nobel Peace Prize
122	Rose Hill	Rose Hill	June 24, 1986 (#73001269)	Fayette; 42°51′38″N 76°56′09″W	Seneca	Large-scale Greek Revival house
123	Roycroft Campus	Roycroft Campus	February 24, 1986 (#74001236)	East Aurora; 42°46′04″N 78°37′04″W	Erie	Elbert Hubbard-founded home of a key community in the Arts and Crafts movement
124	Rudolph Oyster House	Rudolph Oyster House	August 7, 2001 (#01001052)	West Sayville; 40°43′22″N 73°05′43″W	Suffolk	Early 20th century seafood processing plant
125	Sagamore Camp	Sagamore Camp	May 16, 2000 (#76001221)	Raquette Lake; 43°45′56″N 74°37′38″W	Hamilton	Designed by William West Durant; one of the most sophisticated and evolved examples of the Adirondack Great Camps
126	St. Paul's Cathedral	St. Paul's Cathedral	December 23, 1987 (#73002298)	Buffalo; 42°52′58″N 78°52′35″W	Erie	Gothic Revival church designed by Richard Upjohn
127	St. Peter's Episcopal Church	St. Peter's Episcopal Church	January 16, 1980 (#72000817)	Albany; 42°39′03″N 73°45′16″W	Albany	Gothic church by architect Richard Upjohn
128	Santanoni Preserve	Santanoni Preserve	May 16, 2000 (#86002955)	Newcomb; 44°00′41″N 74°07′44″W	Essex	One of the earliest Adirondack Great Camps; a major influence on later ones
129	Saratoga Spa State Park	Saratoga Spa State Park	February 27, 1987 (#85002357)	Saratoga Springs; 43°03′04″N 73°48′14″W	Saratoga	Site of only active geysers in Eastern U.S.; popular resort for wealthy in early 20th century
130	Schuyler Flatts Archeological District	Schuyler Flatts Archeological District	November 4, 1993 (#74001217)	Colonie; 42°42′23″N 73°42′29″W	Albany	Archeological district with artifacts from 6,000 years of human habitation; now a local park.
131	Philip Schuyler Mansion	Philip Schuyler Mansion	December 24, 1967 (#67000008)	Albany; 42°38′29″N 73°45′33″W	Albany	Home of Philip Schuyler, general in the Continental Army and early U.S. Senator
132	William H. Seward House	William H. Seward House	January 29, 1964 (#66000504)	Auburn; 42°55′33″N 76°33′59″W	Cayuga	Home for many years of William Henry Seward, statesman whose long career was capped by the purchase of Alaska as Secretary of State
133	Slabsides	Slabsides	November 24, 1968 (#68000034)	West Park; 41°47′40″N 73°58′23″W	Ulster	Log cabin built by John Burroughs and son as nature retreat
134	USS Slater	USS Slater	March 2, 2012 (#98000393)	Albany; 42°38′33″N 73°44′59″W	Albany	
135	Gerrit Smith Estate	Gerrit Smith Estate	January 30, 2001 (#97001386)	Peterboro; 42°58′04″N 75°41′14″W	Madison	Home of Gerrit Smith, 19th century social reformer and presidential candidate
136	John Philip Sousa House	John Philip Sousa House	May 23, 1966 (#66000532)	Port Washington; 40°50′38″N 73°43′49″W	Nassau	Home of legendary bandleader and composer John Philip Sousa
137	Springside	Springside	August 11, 1969 (#69000141)	Poughkeepsie; 41°41′21″N 73°55′43″W	Dutchess	Only surviving landscape designed by Andrew Jackson Downing; also known as Matthew Vassar Estate
138	Elizabeth Cady Stanton House	Elizabeth Cady Stanton House	June 23, 1965 (#66000572)	Seneca Falls; 42°54′45″N 76°47′18″W	Seneca	Home of 19th century feminist Elizabeth Cady Stanton
139	Stepping Stones (Bill and Lois Wilson House)	Stepping Stones (Bill and Lois Wilson House)	October 16, 2012 (#04000705)	Katonah; 41°14′48″N 73°42′04″W	Westchester	Home of Alcoholics Anonymous cofounder Bill W. and his wife Lois; he wrote The Big Book here and the table around which AA was founded is on exhibit.
140	Stony Point Battlefield	Stony Point Battlefield	January 20, 1961 (#66000567)	Stony Point; 41°14′29″N 73°58′25″W	Rockland	Site of Anthony Wayne's victory over the British in the Battle of Stony Point
141	USS The Sullivans	USS The Sullivans	January 14, 1986 (#86000085)	Buffalo; 42°52′40″N 78°52′52″W	Erie	Example of a Fletcher-class destroyer; saw service in World War II and Korea; now in the Buffalo and Erie County Naval & Military Park
142	Sunnyside	Sunnyside	December 29, 1962 (#66000583)	Tarrytown; 41°02′52″N 73°52′12″W	Westchester	Estate of writer Washington Irving, best known for his short stories "The Legend of Sleepy Hollow" and "Rip Van Winkle"
143	Top Cottage	Top Cottage	December 9, 1997 (#97001679)	Hyde Park; 41°45′54″N 73°53′19″W	Dutchess	Fieldstone cottage built as retreat for Franklin D. Roosevelt, with his input; one of the first American buildings designed to be fully wheelchair accessible
144	Troy Savings Bank	Troy Savings Bank	April 11, 1989 (#89001066)	Troy; 42°43′49″N 73°41′17″W	Rensselaer	Designed by George B. Post to accommodate both a functioning bank on the first floor and an auditorium
145	Harriet Tubman Home for the Aged, Harriet Tubman Residence, Thompson A.M.E. Zion Church	Harriet Tubman Home for the Aged, Harriet Tubman Residence, Thompson A.M.E. Zion Church	May 30, 1974 (#74001222)	Auburn; 42°54′40″N 76°34′04″W	Cayuga	Properties associated with Harriet Tubman, a conductor on the Underground Railroad
146	United States Military Academy	United States Military Academy	December 19, 1960 (#66000562)	Highlands; 41°23′32″N 73°57′27″W	Orange	Commonly known as West Point; oldest continuously occupied military post in the nation and alma mater of many U.S. Army leaders
147	Utica State Hospital (Main Building)	Utica State Hospital (Main Building)	June 30, 1989 (#71000548)	Utica; 43°06′18″N 75°15′12″W	Oneida	First hospital for the "insane poor"; archetypal Greek Revival building
148	Valcour Bay	Valcour Bay	January 1, 1961 (#66000508)	Lake Champlain; 44°37′04″N 73°25′57″W	Clinton	Site of Battle of Valcour Island during the Revolutionary War
149	Van Alen House	Van Alen House	December 24, 1967 (#67000011)	Kinderhook; 42°22′52″N 73°41′29″W	Columbia	Exemplary Dutch colonial farmhouse, built in 1737 and preserved largely intact
150	Van Cortlandt Manor	Van Cortlandt Manor	November 5, 1961 (#66000579)	Croton-On-Hudson; 41°11′30″N 73°52′35″W	Westchester	Colonial manor house from early 18th century
151	Vassar College Observatory	Vassar College Observatory	July 17, 1991 (#91002051)	Poughkeepsie; 41°41′15″N 73°53′37″W	Dutchess	Workplace and home of Maria Mitchell, important 19th century astronomer and pioneering woman in the science
152	Villa Lewaro	Villa Lewaro	May 11, 1976 (#76001289)	Irvington; 41°02′35″N 73°51′50″W	Westchester	Home of Madam C.J. Walker, first known African-American millionaire
153	Washington's Headquarters	Washington's Headquarters	January 20, 1961 (#66000887)	Newburgh; 41°29′55″N 74°00′28″W	Orange	Headquarters of Washington during the final years of the Revolutionary War; Dutch stone house; oldest building in Newburgh; first-ever property designated as a historic site by a U.S. state
154	Watervliet Arsenal	Watervliet Arsenal	November 13, 1966 (#66000503)	Watervliet; 42°43′06″N 73°42′31″W	Albany	Oldest arsenal in U.S.
155	Elkanah Watson House	Elkanah Watson House	July 19, 1964 (#66000518)	Port Kent; 44°31′30″N 73°24′21″W	Essex	Home of Elkanah Watson, Revolutionary-era diplomat, founder of the county fair and early promoter of canals
156^{†}	West Point Foundry Archeological Site		January 13, 2021 (#100006260)	Kemble Ave. 41°24′51″N 73°57′11″W	Putnam	
157	Willard Memorial Chapel-Welch Memorial Hall	Willard Memorial Chapel-Welch Memorial Hall	April 5, 2005 (#89000461)	Auburn; 42°56′14″N 76°33′48″W	Cayuga	Last remaining Louis Comfort Tiffany stained glass installation in its original form
158	Winged Foot Golf Club	Winged Foot Golf Club	December 13, 2024 (#100011388)	851 Fenimore Rd. 40°57′28″N 73°45′13″W	Westchester	Country club with two golf courses completed in 1923 is last designed by A.W. Tillinghast that features a Clifford Charles Wendehack clubhouse; has hosted several U.S. Opens.
159	Jethro Wood House	Jethro Wood House	July 19, 1964 (#66000505)	Poplar Ridge; 42°44′15″N 76°37′56″W	Cayuga	
160	Woodchuck Lodge	Woodchuck Lodge	December 29, 1962 (#66000512)	Roxbury; 42°17′47″N 74°35′01″W	Delaware	
161	Yaddo	Yaddo	February 27, 2013 (#13000282)	Saratoga Springs; 43°04′07″N 73°45′29″W	Saratoga	Former estate now a prominent artists' colony and writers' retreat.

== Current NHLs in New York City ==
New York City alone is home to 116 NHLs. The earliest was designated on October 9, 1960; the latest was designated on November 2, 2016. Many of the NHLs in NYC are also landmarked individually or as part of districts by the New York City Landmarks Preservation Commission. See List of New York City Designated Landmarks.

== Historic areas in the United States National Park System ==
National Historic Sites, National Historic Parks, National Memorials, and certain other areas listed in the National Park system are historic landmarks of national importance that are highly protected already, often before the inauguration of the NHL program in 1960. There are 20 of these in New York State. The legislation establishing the National Historic Landmark program does not prevent these from being designated, but in practice these are not often named NHLs per se, due to administrative costs of their nomination and to the low preservation value of designating them.

For the first 16 years of the National Historic Landmarks program, the National Park Service did not consider any sites already within the National Park system for NHL designation, and in fact if an NHL-designated site came into the NPS system it was de-designated.

In New York State, the William Floyd House within the Fire Island National Seashore and Ellis Island within the Statue of Liberty National Monument were both deemed NHL-eligible by the advisory board but were not designated.

It was not until 1977 that a policy was promulgated that would allow for designation of a National Historic Landmark "whose primary significance is not related to its park's purpose". The Jacob Riis House in Queens was de-designated in 1973.

The National Park Service identifies 18 historic sites within national park units in New York State, and lists these together with the NHLs in the state, and there are also two National Historic Sites that are "affiliated areas," receiving National Park Service support but not directly administered by it. (Note: The National Park Service provides technical and financial assistance to two "affiliated areas" in New York specifically authorized by Congress: Lower East Side Tenement National Historic Site and Thomas Cole National Historic Site.) Seven of the 20 were declared National Historic Landmarks, in several instances before receiving the higher protection designation, and retain their NHL standing. Four of these are listed above and three are included within the New York City list of NHLs. The 13 others are:

	Landmark name	Image	Date established	Location	County	Description
1	Castle Clinton National Monument	Castle Clinton in Battery Park (HABS)	August 12, 1946	New York	New York	Circular sandstone fort in Battery Park at the southern tip of Manhattan, New York City
2	Statue of Liberty National Monument		October 15, 1924	Liberty Island	New York	Monumental statue (Liberty Enlightening the World) presented to the United States by the people of France in 1886
3	Saratoga National Historical Park		June 1, 1938	Stillwater, Schuylerville and Victory	Saratoga	Site of the 1777 Battle of Saratoga, the first significant American military victory of the American Revolutionary War
4	Women's Rights National Historical Park	Remains of the Wesleyan Chapel.	December 8, 1980	Seneca Falls and Waterloo	Seneca	Established in 1980 in Seneca Falls and nearby Waterloo, New York; includes the Wesleyan Chapel, site of the Seneca Falls Convention and the Elizabeth Cady Stanton House
5	Eleanor Roosevelt National Historic Site	Stone Cottage	May 27, 1977	Hyde Park	Dutchess	Property developed by Eleanor Roosevelt; place that she could develop some of her ideas for work with winter jobs for rural workers and women; includes a large two-story stuccoed building that housed Val-Kill Industries; would become Eleanor's home after Franklin's death
6	Home of Franklin D. Roosevelt National Historic Site	Front elevation of house, with visitors, in 2004	January 15, 1944	Hyde Park	Dutchess	Birthplace, lifelong home, and burial place of the 32nd President of the United States, Franklin Delano Roosevelt
7	Sagamore Hill National Historic Site	Sagamore Hill	July 25, 1962	Cove Neck	Nassau	Home of the 26th President of the United States Theodore Roosevelt from 1886 until his death in 1919
8	Saint Paul's Church National Historic Site		July 5, 1943	Mount Vernon	Westchester	Colonial church used as a military hospital during the American Revolutionary War
9	Theodore Roosevelt Birthplace National Historic Site	The front and entrance of the house.	July 25, 1962	New York	New York	Theodore Roosevelt born on this site on October 27, 1858
10	Theodore Roosevelt Inaugural National Historic Site	Ansley Wilcox House, 1965	November 2, 1966	Buffalo	Erie	Site of Theodore Roosevelt's oath of office as President of the United States on September 14, 1901
11	Vanderbilt Mansion National Historic Site	The severe classicism, perfect balance, and heavy ornamentation of Hyde Park, designed for Frederick Vanderbilt by McKim, Mead & White, is a perfect example of Beaux-Arts architecture.	December 18, 1940	Hyde Park	Dutchess	Includes pleasure grounds with views of the Hudson River and Catskill Mountains, formal gardens, natural woodlands, and numerous support structures as well as a 54-room mansion; completed in 1898; perfect example of the Beaux-Arts architecture style
12	Federal Hall National Memorial		May 26, 1939	New York	New York	First capitol of the United States of America; site of George Washington's first inauguration in 1789; place where the United States Bill of Rights passed; original building was demolished in the nineteenth century; replaced by the current structure, that served as the first United States Customs House
13	General Grant National Memorial	Grant's tomb 2004	April 27, 1897	New York	New York	Mausoleum containing the bodies of Ulysses S. Grant (1822–1885), an American Civil War General and the 18th President of the United States, and his wife, Julia Dent Grant (1826–1902)

There are four other National Park Service areas in New York State that do not have historic standing. (Note: Non-historic National Park Service areas in New York are: Gateway National Recreation Area (joint with New Jersey), Fire Island National Seashore, The Upper Delaware Scenic and Recreational River (shared with New Jersey), and the North Country National Scenic Trail, that starts at Crown Point in New York and stretches to North Dakota.)

== NHLs formerly located in New York ==
The following Landmarks were located in New York at the time they were declared National Historic Landmarks, but have since moved to other states.

	Landmark name	Image	Date of designation	Location	Description
1	USS Edson (DD-946)		June 21, 1990	Michigan	One of two surviving Forrest Sherman-class destroyers; saw action from World War II to Vietnam; In NYC from 1989 to 2004; relocated to Michigan in 2013.
2	Fir (Coast Guard cutter)	Lighthouse tender USCGC Fir at sea with the Cape Flattery Light, Washington, in the background.	April 27, 1992	California	Lighthouse tender that served on west coast; last working vessel in the fleet of the United States Lighthouse Service, ancestors of today's United States Coast Guard buoy tenders; was intended at the time of NHL designation to become a museum ship in New York, but it is unclear if the ship was ever visited; transferred to Sacramento, California in 2002.
3	Nantucket (lightship)		December 20, 1989	Massachusetts	Largest lightship ever built. Originally listed while she was primarily in Maine; sojourned for several years in Oyster Bay, New York. Arrived in Boston May 11, 2010.

== Former NHLs in New York ==
The following sites in New York were formerly National Historic Landmarks but were delisted.

	Landmark name	Image	Date of designation	Location	County	Description
1	Edwin H. Armstrong House	Standing, circa 1975 Demolished, 1983	January 7, 1976	Yonkers	Westchester	Home of scientist and FM radio inventor Edwin H. Armstrong; demolished in 1983 and subsequently de-designated
2	Old Blenheim Bridge		January 29, 1964	North Blenheim; 42.472531°N 74.44127°W	Schoharie	Longest single span covered bridge in Eastern United States; one of the longest in the world, until destruction during floods after Hurricane Irene in 2011. Designation withdrawn July 21, 2015

== See also ==
- Great Camps
- Historic preservation in New York
- New York State Register of Historic Places
- List of National Historic Landmarks by state
- List of National Natural Landmarks in New York
- List of New York State Historic Sites
- List of New York state parks § State historic sites
- National Register of Historic Places listings in New York
