= Petrified Sea Gardens =

- U.S. National Register of Historic Places
- U.S. National Historic Landmark
- National Natural Landmark
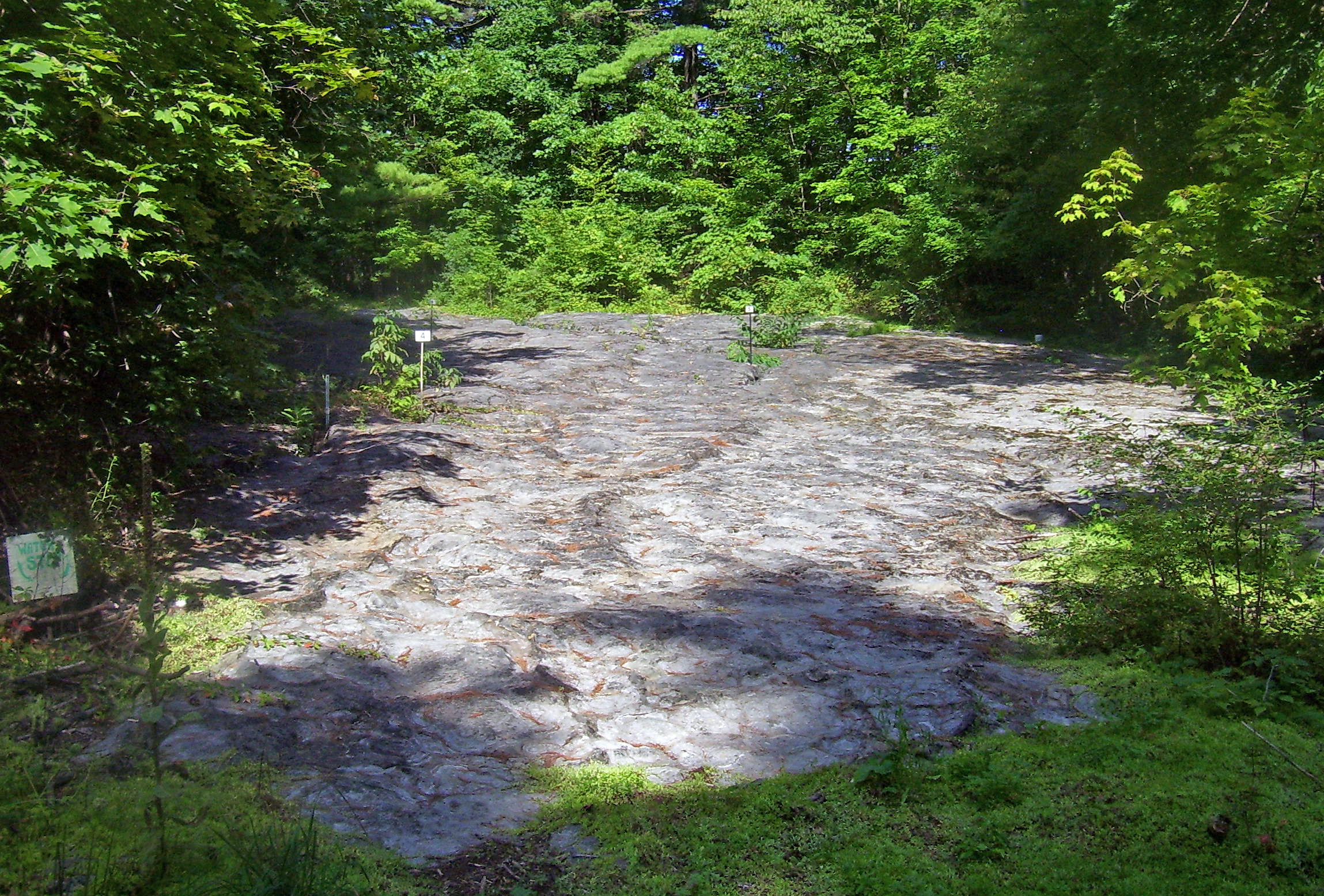
- Cambrian Period undersea grotto near park entrance, 2008

- Location within New York Location within the United States
- Location: Petrified Sea Gardens Rd., Saratoga Springs, New York
- Coordinates: 43°4′58.97″N 73°50′40.16″W
- Area: 25 acres (10 ha)
- Built: 1825
- NRHP reference No.: 99000631

Significant dates
- Added to NRHP: January 20, 1999
- Designated NHL: January 20, 1999
- Designated NNL: April 1967

Petrified Sea Gardens, also once known as Ritchie Park, is a National Historic Landmark on Petrified Sea Gardens Road in Saratoga Springs, New York. It preserves a bed of ancient stromatolites in a Cambrian rock layer, which were the first to be recognized and understood for what they are. The site was a private park open to the public for many years, but is now closed. The site was designated a National Natural Landmark in 1967, and a National Historic Landmark in 1999.

== Description and history ==
The Petrified Sea Gardens site is located at 42 Petrified Sea Gardens Road, about 0.5 miles (0.80 km) north of N.Y. 29, in far western Saratoga Springs, New York. The site is about 25 acres (10 ha) in size, although the outcrops of interest occupy only about 1.5 acres (0.61 ha) of the largely wooded site. The outcrops are a part of a larger geological formation known as the Hoyt Limestone, which is also exposed in Lester Park, a public park operated by the New York State Museum about 1 mile (1.6 km) north of this site. Although stromatolites can be found more widely, they are rarely exposed in this area because of later glacial action.

The structures now identified as stromatolites, which are marine algae growths, were first identified on this site in 1825, but what they were was unknown and the subject of scientific debate. James Hall (1811–1898), the first State Paleontologist of New York, identified them as being organic and placed stromatolites in a new genus. Pioneering female paleontologist Winifred Goldring (1888–1971), was the first to identify the creatures responsible for creating the structures found, and described those found here among the finest surviving specimens. Samples from this site were later compared to stromatolites of more recent construction found in Australia.

In 1924, Robert F. Ritchie, a stonemason and amateur geologist who owned the property, opened a park to show them to the public. The site was a childhood inspiration for paleontologist Stephen Jay Gould. The site was most recently open as an educational site operated by a non-profit, the Friends of Petrified Sea Gardens until 2006. It is currently closed to the public.

== See also ==
- James Hall Office, also a National Historic Landmark
- List of National Historic Landmarks in New York
- List of National Natural Landmarks in New York
- National Register of Historic Places listings in Saratoga County, New York
