= Locust Grove (Poughkeepsie, New York) =

Historic house in New York, United States

- U.S. National Register of Historic Places
- U.S. National Historic Landmark
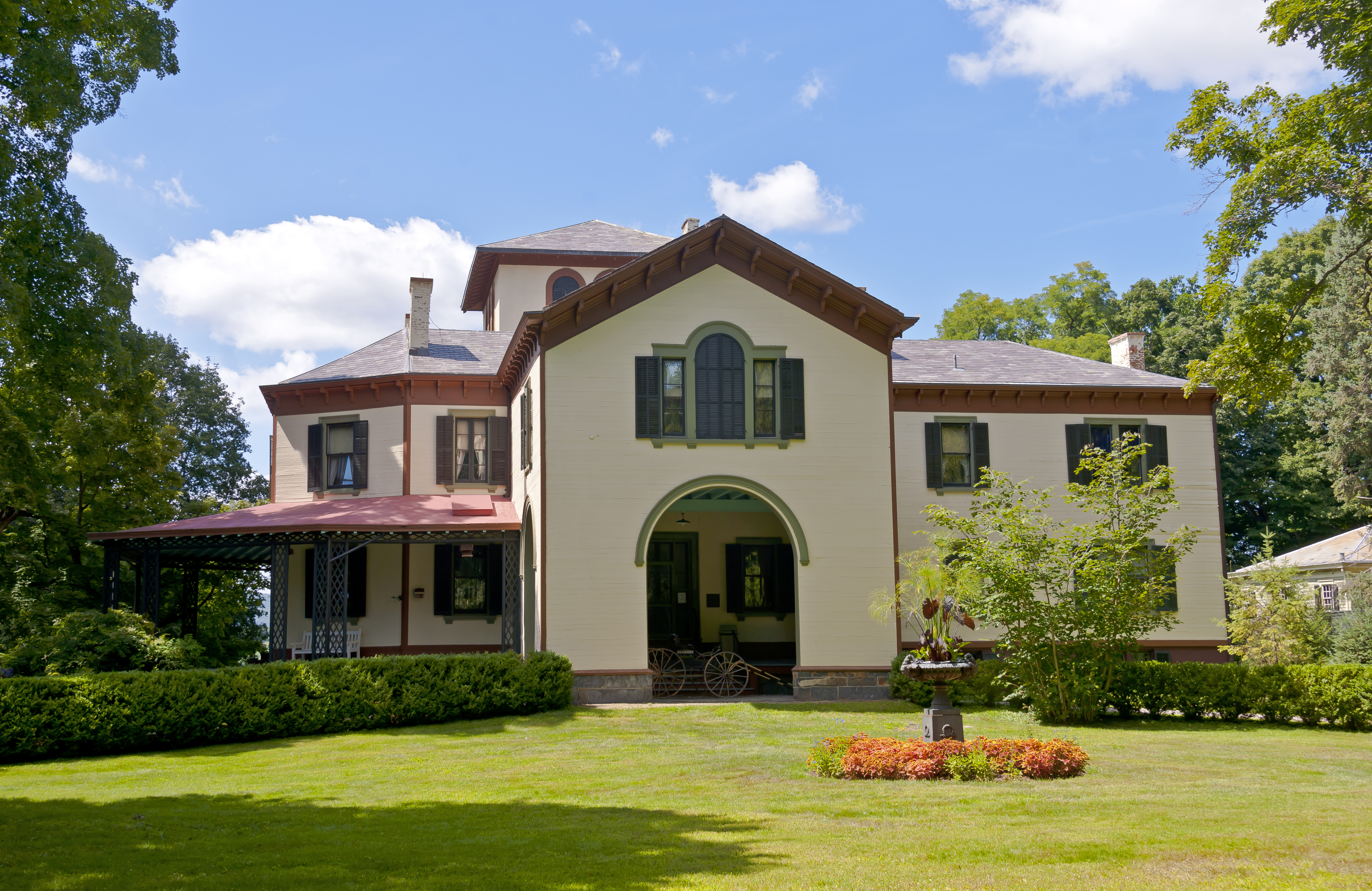
- West (front) elevation in 2014

- Location within New York Location within the United States
- Interactive map showing the location for Locust Grove
- Location: Town of Poughkeepsie, NY
- Nearest city: Poughkeepsie
- Coordinates: 41°40′23″N 73°55′54″W
- Area: 200 acres (81 ha)
- Built: 1851
- Architect: Alexander Jackson Davis
- Architectural style: Italianate
- NRHP reference No.: 66000515

Significant dates
- Added to NRHP: October 15, 1966
- Designated NHL: January 29, 1964

Locust Grove is a National Historic Landmark estate located on US 9 in the Town of Poughkeepsie, New York. The 200-acre park-like estate includes homes, a carriage house, ice house, trails, a flower garden, and vegetable garden, and it overlooks the Hudson River from a bluff. The property includes a home designed by architect Alexander Jackson Davis for Samuel F. B. Morse, the inventor of the telegraph. An Italianate style mansion, it was completed in 1851.

The estate is open to the public, tours are offered, and the site is used for weddings and parties. It includes a museum, nature preserve, antique exhibits, and a gallery showing artworks.

== History ==
Henry Livingston Jr. was Locust Grove's first resident owner and named the estate after the black locust trees growing on the property in 1771 when he purchased the property from his own father. After his death his heirs sold the property to a wealthy New York City couple, John and Isabella Montgomery. They moved farming operations to the lower-lying lands closer to the river and built a cottage.

Morse bought the land from them in 1847, three years after his breakthrough with the telegraph. He hired Davis in 1851 and began working with him to remodel and expand the cottage into an Italianate villa. He continued to improve the landscape around the house, which became his summer home, for the rest of his life.

After Morse's death in 1872, his family spent less time in Poughkeepsie and eventually emptied the mansion and rented the estate. One of their tenants, William Young, moved to Locust Grove in 1895 and eventually bought the property from Morse's heirs in 1901. He and his wife Martha realized its historic importance and restored the mansion and gardens. They added modern amenities like central heat, and hot and cold running water, as well as a new dining room and guest bedrooms in a large north wing (the last significant renovation to the building). Family heirlooms were the foundation of the Young Family's 20,000-piece collection of fine and decorative arts, today displayed in the mansion's 40 rooms.

William and Martha Young's daughter Annette and son Innis also worked to preserve and restore the house, which was declared a National Historic Landmark in 1964. Annette and Innis Young also restored their great-great grandfather's home, the Locust Lawn Estate and opened it to the public as a museum in 1958.

Annette Young died in 1975, establishing in her will a trust so that her house, property, and collections of paintings and decorative arts could be opened to the public. Five years later, they were. Today the estate offers guided tours, lectures and other special events. Five miles of trails, originally 19th-century carriage roads, have been built in the woods around the house. Admission to the grounds is free; there is a fee for guided tours of the mansion.

== See also ==
- List of National Historic Landmarks in New York
- National Register of Historic Places listings in Poughkeepsie, New York
