= Owl's Nest =

Historic house in New York, United States

- Owl's Nest (Edward Eggleston Estate)
- U.S. National Register of Historic Places
- U.S. National Historic Landmark
- New York State Register of Historic Places
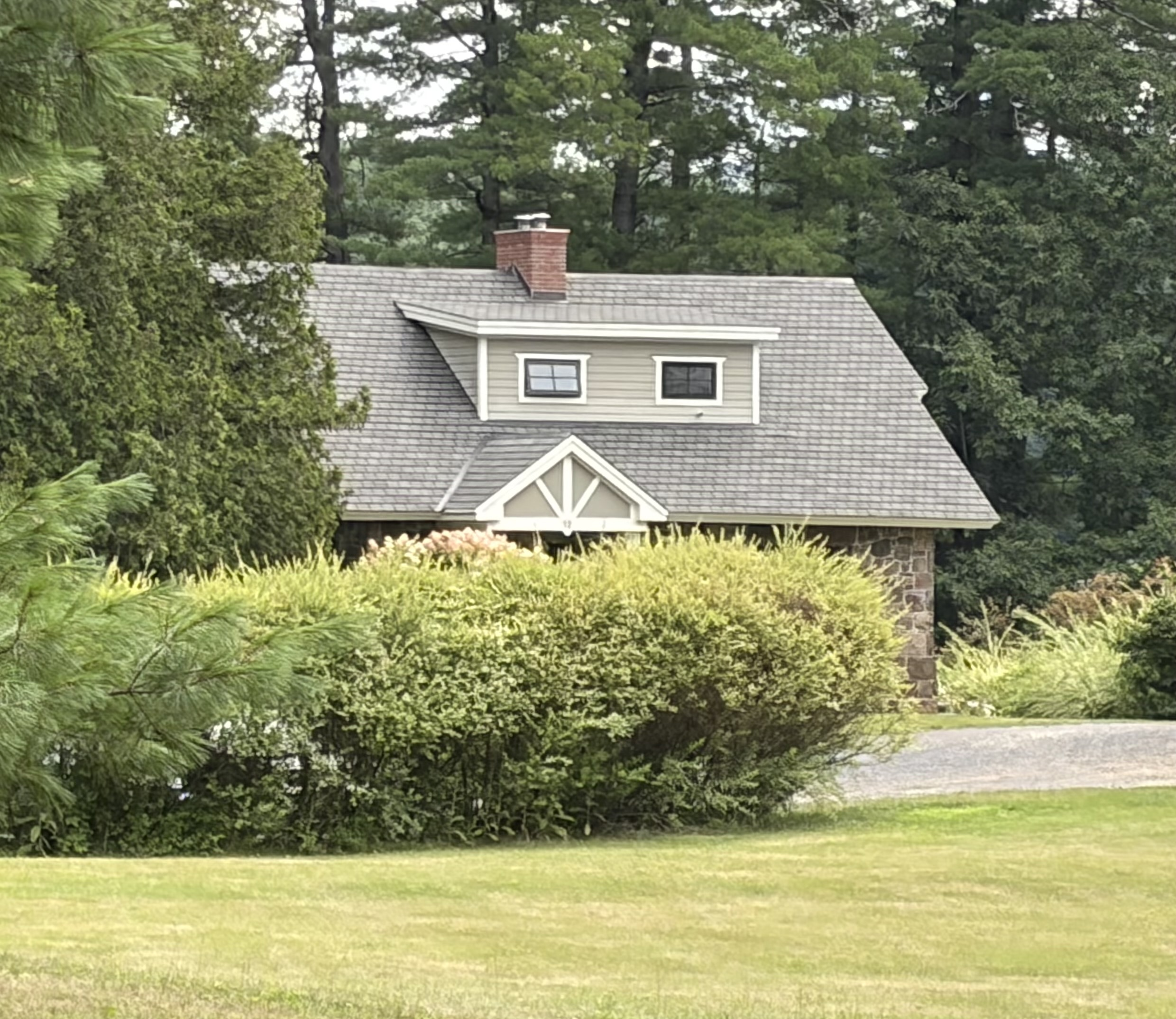
- Eggleston's stone residence at Owl's Nest

- Location within New York Location within the United States
- Location: Off NY 9L, Queensbury, NY
- Coordinates: 43°26′41″N 73°39′18″W
- Area: 10 acres (4.0 ha)
- Built: 1881
- NRHP reference No.: 71000565
- NYSRHP No.: 11308.000063

Significant dates
- Added to NRHP: November 11, 1971
- Designated NHL: November 11, 1971
- Designated NYSRHP: June 23, 1980

Owl's Nest, also known as the Edward Eggleston Estate, is a historic estate property located on the shore of Lake George in Queensbury, New York. Developed in the 1870s and 1880s, it was the home of Edward Eggleston (1837-1902), one of America's first realist writers. He began summering there in the 1870s and it was his permanent home from the mid-1880s until his death. The property was declared a National Historic Landmark in 1971.

== Description and history ==
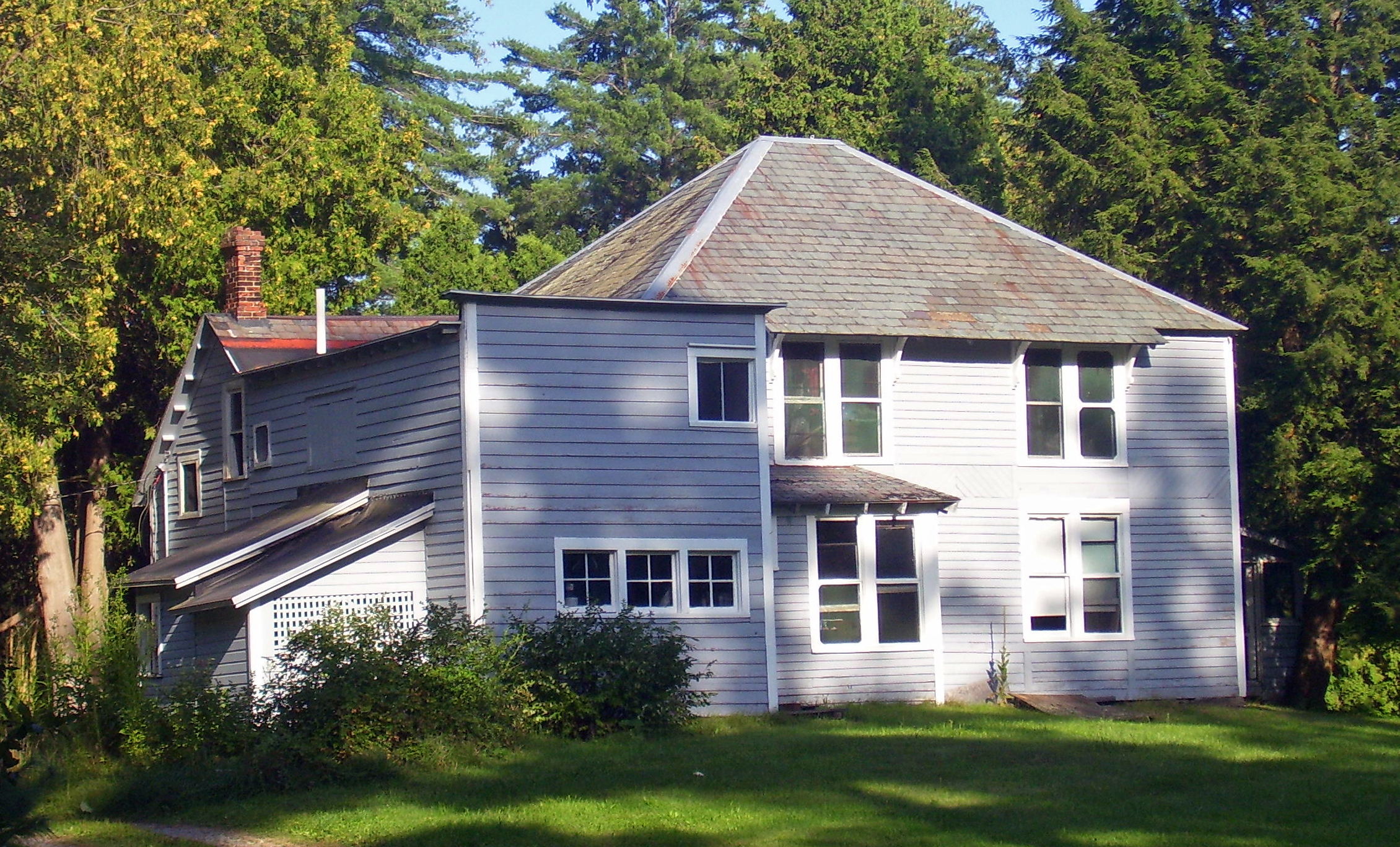
Main house at Owl's Nest from southwest, 2008

Owl's Nest is located on the east side of Lake George, in the area known as Joshua's Rock, overlooking Dunham Bay northeast of village of Lake George. The property is about 10 acres (4.0 ha) in size, and includes three historic buildings and a family graveyard in which Edward Eggleston is buried. The main house, known as "The Homestead", is a two-story clapboarded frame structure with a hip roof, which was built in 1879 for Eggleston's daughter and son-in-law, Elizabeth and Elwin Seelye. Eggleston's house, built in the late 1880s, is a 1 1/2-story stone structure, to which a frame wing was added about 1890. It is connected by a breezeway to "Mellowstone", another stone structure built in 1883 to serve as Eggleston's library.

Eggleston first summered in the Lake George area in about 1875, and this property became his only permanent address after the Seelyes developed it in the late 1870s. He lived here during most of the year except for the winter months, which were typically spent in New York City, Washington, D.C., and Madison, Indiana. He did most of the writing of his later years here, and it remained his home until his death in 1902. The property remained in the hands of his descendants for many years thereafter.

== See also ==
- National Register of Historic Places listings in Warren County, New York
- List of National Historic Landmarks in New York
