= Fort Massapeag Archeological Site =

- U.S. National Register of Historic Places
- U.S. National Historic Landmark
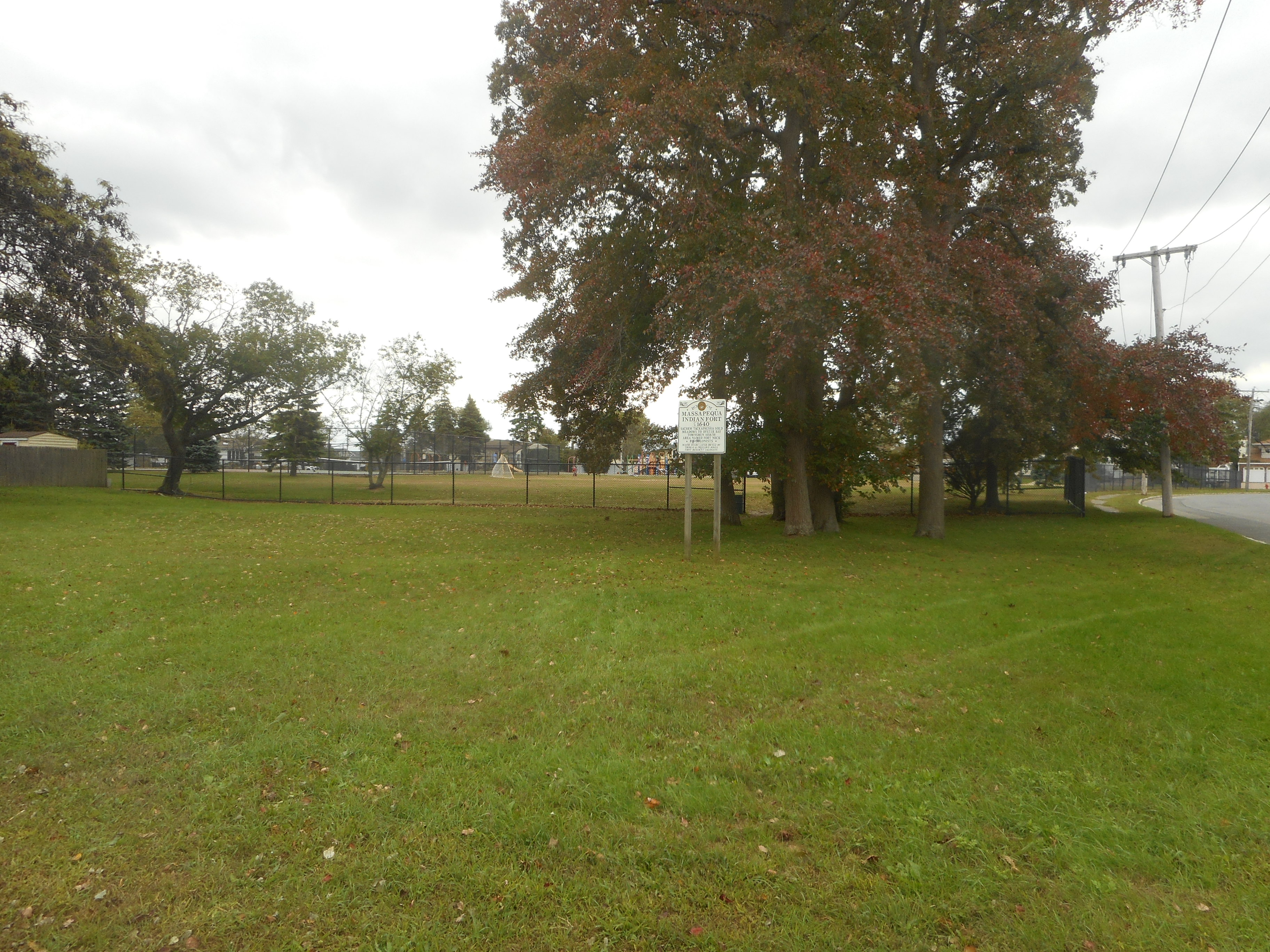
- The site of Fort Massapeag in Sunset Park

- Location within New York Location within the United States
- Location: Sunset Park, Massapequa, NY
- Coordinates: 40°39′11″N 73°27′40″W
- NRHP reference No.: 93000610

Significant dates
- Added to NRHP: April 19, 1993
- Designated NHL: April 19, 1993

Fort Massapeag Archeological Site is a historic archaeological site at Sunset Park in Massapequa, New York. It is believed to be the site of a New Netherland trading post built in the mid-17th century to facilitate trade with local Native Americans, and possibly serve as a wampum factory. It was first excavated in the 1930s by a team including Ralph Solecki. It was declared a National Historic Landmark in 1993.

== History ==
The proposed construction of Fort Massapeag formed part of the broader network of defensive and trading posts maintained by New Netherland. Following the Peach War of 1655, Dutch colonial authorities strengthened settlements around New Amsterdam and sought agreements with Native communities in the surrounding region.

In 1656, Peter Stuyvesant, the director of the New Netherland colony (now New York City) signed an agreement with Lenape chief Tackapausha, which included a provision that the Dutch would construct "A howse or A forte" for trade with Natives residing on Long Island. Ralph Solecki, a professional archaeologist with a long interest in this site, believes this site to be the fortified trading post that was then built. The trading post remained in operation until the Dutch turned New Netherland over to the British in 1664, and the land was sold by the Lenape to English settlers in 1694.

The area has long been known as "Fort Neck", and many people believed the remnant fortifications to be of Native construction, and possibly the site of a conflict between the English and Natives. The area came to the attention of archaeologists in the 1930s, when the Harbor Green development began, uncovering graves of Native Americans and the site of a village, which was destroyed in the process. The fort site itself was already well known to local collectors, and was significantly compromised by their activities. Solecki participated in an early excavation of the site, which formed the basis of his eventual doctoral dissertation.

The site was preserved from development and turned into what is now Sunset Park; a sign commemorating its significance stands near the junction of Fairfax and Gloucester Roads.

== See also ==
- List of National Historic Landmarks in New York
- National Register of Historic Places listings in Oyster Bay (town), New York

== Sources ==
- Grumet, Robert (1995). Historic Contact: Indian People and Colonists in Today's Northeastern United States in the Sixteenth Through Eighteenth Centuries. University of Oklahoma Press. ISBN 9780806127002.
- Cantwell, Anne-Marie E; Wall, Diana diZerega (2003). Unearthing Gotham: The Archaeology of New York City. Yale University Press. ISBN 9780300097993.
