= James Hall Office =

Historic building in Albany, New York

- U.S. National Register of Historic Places
- U.S. National Historic Landmark
- New York State Register of Historic Places
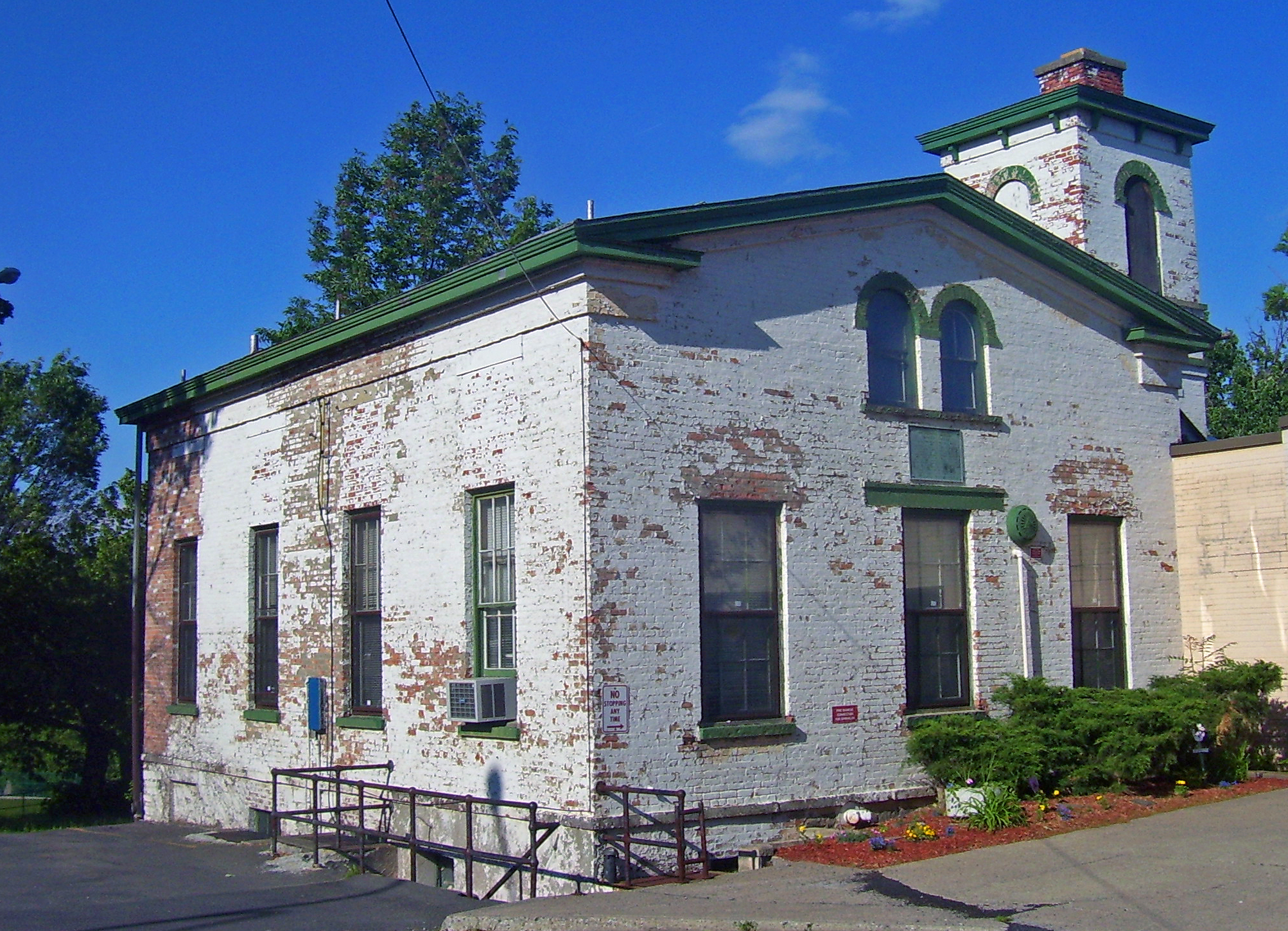
- West profile and south (front) elevation, 2008

- Location within New York Location within the United States
- Location: Lincoln Park, Albany, NY
- Coordinates: 42°38′45″N 73°46′7″W
- Built: 1852
- Architect: Calvert Vaux and Andrew Jackson Downing
- Architectural style: Italianate
- NRHP reference No.: 76001204
- NYSRHP No.: 00140.000323

Significant dates
- Added to NRHP: December 8, 1976
- Designated NHL: December 8, 1976
- Designated NYSRHP: June 23, 1980

The James Hall Office, formerly a part of the Sunshine School, is a small brick Italianate building in Lincoln Park ib Albany, New York, United States. Now annexed to a more modern school building, it was designated a National Historic Landmark in 1976 for its association with James Hall (1811–1898), a leading 19th-century American geologist.

It is one of the few buildings remaining from a brief period of collaboration between Andrew Jackson Downing and Calvert Vaux. Hall, a paleontologist, led research on the geology of North America during the 19th century. He spent much of his time working in this small building, which served him as both office and laboratory. Among his many discoveries here, Hall found that the stromatolite fossils discovered at Petrified Sea Gardens, a site near Saratoga Springs, also a National Historic Landmark, were originally organic.

In the late 20th century it was expanded slightly and annexed to one of Albany's elementary schools. It served that purpose until 2011. After voters approved the school district's plan to sell it, the building and annex is pending purchase by the Boys and Girls Club of Albany.

== Building ==
The former office is located on the northwest corner of the building, in the southwest portion of the park. One of the park's internal access roads, to the south, provides access to a parking lot on the west. Beyond it, Morton Avenue is 300 ft (100 m) to the south. On the west is a large octagonal children's swimming pool, basketball court and tennis courts along Delaware Avenue (U.S. Route 9W).

To the north is another, larger school. A wooded area past it buffers the park from the Center Square/Hudson–Park Historic District to the north. Eastward, the park extends for another half-mile (800 m) to Eagle Street, sloping gently down toward the Hudson River a mile (1.6 km) further to the east. The South End–Groesbeckville Historic District begins along Morton just southeast of Eagle.

The building itself is a one-story three-by-four-bay brick structure with a gently pitched front-gabled roof. A small tower is at its southeast corner, topped by a flat roof pierced by a brick chimney. On its east it is joined to the school building for the entire length. A stairway to the basement, with modern metal guardrail, is cut into the pavement at the southwest corner. It has been painted white, which has begun to fade and flake off, with green trim.

A string course of projecting brick divides the basement and first story. Windows are all set with six-over-six double-hung sash. All have simple sills of brick; the central window on the south (front) facade has a similar lintel. The main entrance is located to its east.

Above that central window is a commemorative plaque. It is topped by a pair of smaller windows, segmentally arched in splayed brick. At the roofline is a molded cornice. The tower has a stringcourse separating its top and bottom stages, with a single segmental-arched window similar to those on the south facade on each of its faces. Small brackets hold up the cornice.

== History ==
A Massachusetts native, James Hall came to the Capital District to study under Amos Eaton at what is now Rensselaer Polytechnic Institute (RPI) in Troy. Hall also went on field expeditions led by Ebenezer Emmons, which along with Eaton led him to choose geology as a career. After working at the RPI library following graduation, he began working with the state's newly established geological survey, which became his lifelong career.

After a groundbreaking 1843 report on the state's fourth district which established him as one of the nation's leading stratigraphers and paleontologists, the survey asked him to do a paleontological report on the entire state. The resulting eight-volume, 13-part report, considered an American scientific classic, was not published until 1894, four years before his death. During that time he was appointed the state geologist for not only New York but Iowa and Wisconsin as well, and the director of the New York State Museum.

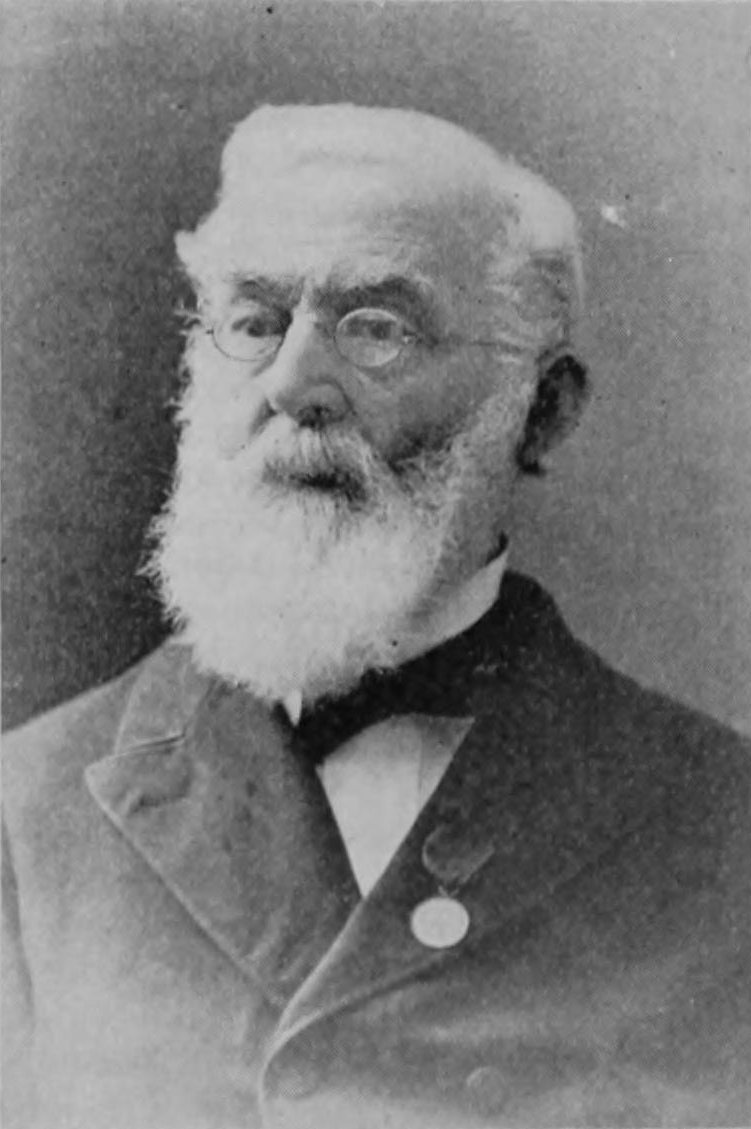
James Hall in his later career

His work consisted primarily of reviewing and inspecting fossil and rock samples, not just from New York but the entire country. By 1850 he had run out of storage space at his state office, so he had this building constructed for the exclusive use of himself and his assistants. Andrew Jackson Downing and his student Calvert Vaux were collaborating at the time, and designed it in the Italian villa style the former had popularized. It closely matches one drawing in Downing's influential pattern book, The Architecture of Country Houses. The two architects' collaboration ended with Downing's death in a steamboat accident on the Hudson in 1852, the year the building was finished. It is one of the few extant works credited to both Downing and Vaux.

In the 1880s, Hall had a house for his family built nearby. He nevertheless spent so much time working in the office, sometimes sleeping there, that he and his family grew distant. In 1885 the state insisted he work out of one of its offices; however he continued to spend a great deal of his time at the 1852 office until he died 13 years later. Its interior, essentially one large room at the time, was lined with charts, specimens and books. Off to one side was his spartan bedroom.

By 1916 the city had acquired the building. That year the geological survey had the plaque, commemorating Hall's life and work in the building, affixed. At some point during the intervening 60 years between then and its National Historic Landmark designation, it began being used as a school. It was annexed to the Sunshine School building shortly after that.

The school remained open until 2011. Shortly after it was closed, the Albany City School District agreed to sell the building to the Boys & Girls Club of Albany. The sale is still pending

== See also ==
- List of National Historic Landmarks in New York
- National Register of Historic Places listings in Albany, New York
