= William Floyd House =

Historic house in New York, United States

- U.S. National Register of Historic Places
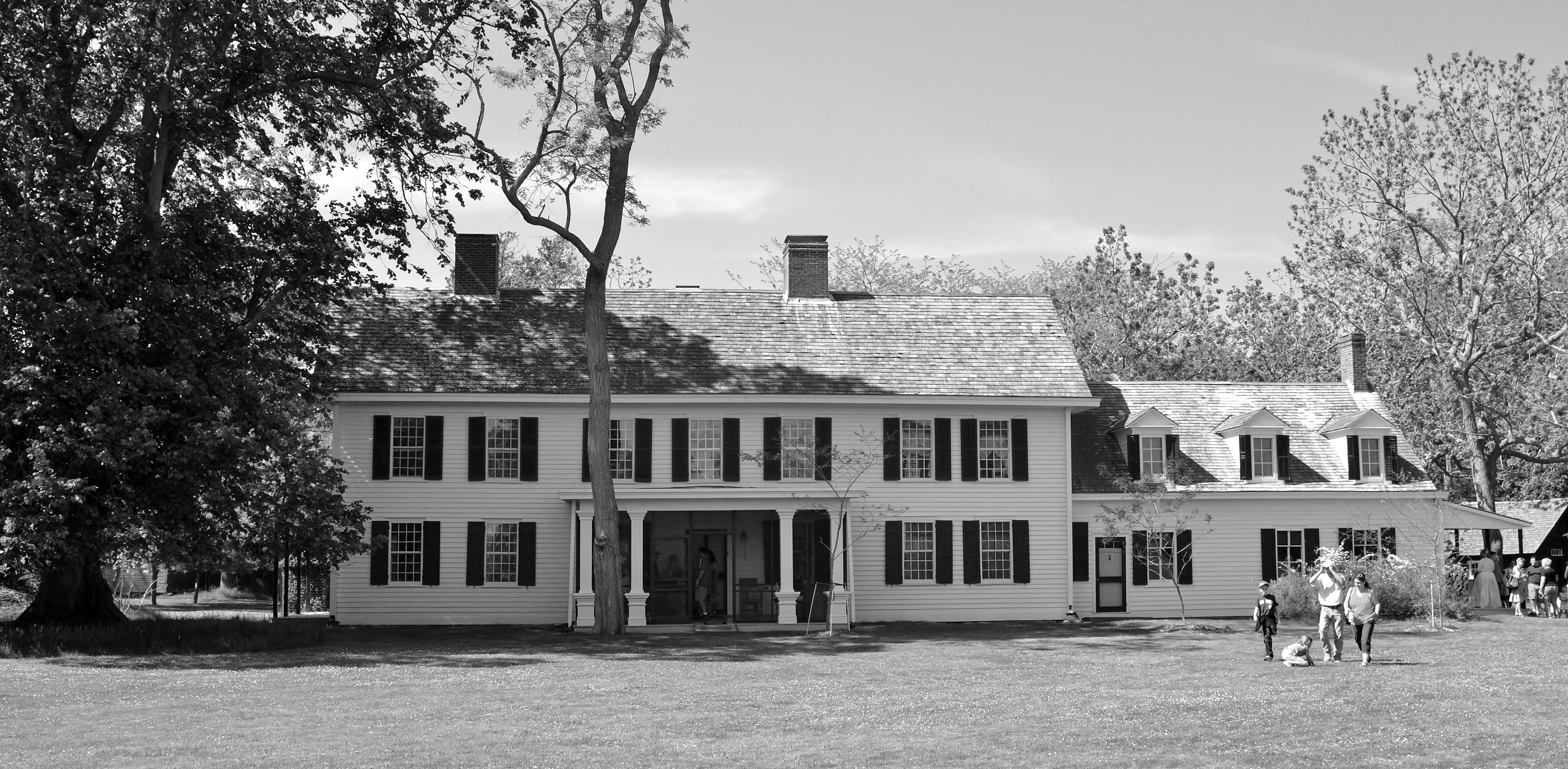

- Location within New York Location within the United States
- Location: 20 Washington Ave., Mastic Beach, New York
- Coordinates: 40°46′9″N 72°49′21″W
- Area: 611 acres (247 ha)
- Built: 1774
- Architectural style: Georgian
- NRHP reference No.: 71000066
- Added to NRHP: October 15, 1980

William Floyd House, also known as Nicoll Floyd House and Old Mastic House, was a home of Founding Father William Floyd, a signer of the United States Declaration of Independence, in Mastic Beach, New York. It was his home from 1734 until 1803. This home is distinct from Gen. William Floyd House, his later home in Westernville, New York, that is also on the National Register and which was designated a National Historic Landmark.

The two William Floyd houses are believed to be the only surviving homes in New York of signers of the Declaration of Independence. The Mastic home is "reputed to be the best preserved and oldest manor house" in its part of Long Island.

It is located about 0.29 miles (0.47 km) south of Washington Avenue and Wavecrest Drive in Mastic Beach. The home was built by Nicoll Floyd, who was William Floyd's father, and was given to William's son, also named Nicoll Floyd. The house was visited by Marquis de Lafayette and others.

The house is owned by the National Park Service as part of Fire Island National Seashore, although it's not on Fire Island itself.
