= Elihu Root House =

Historic house in New York, United States

- U.S. National Register of Historic Places
- U.S. National Historic Landmark
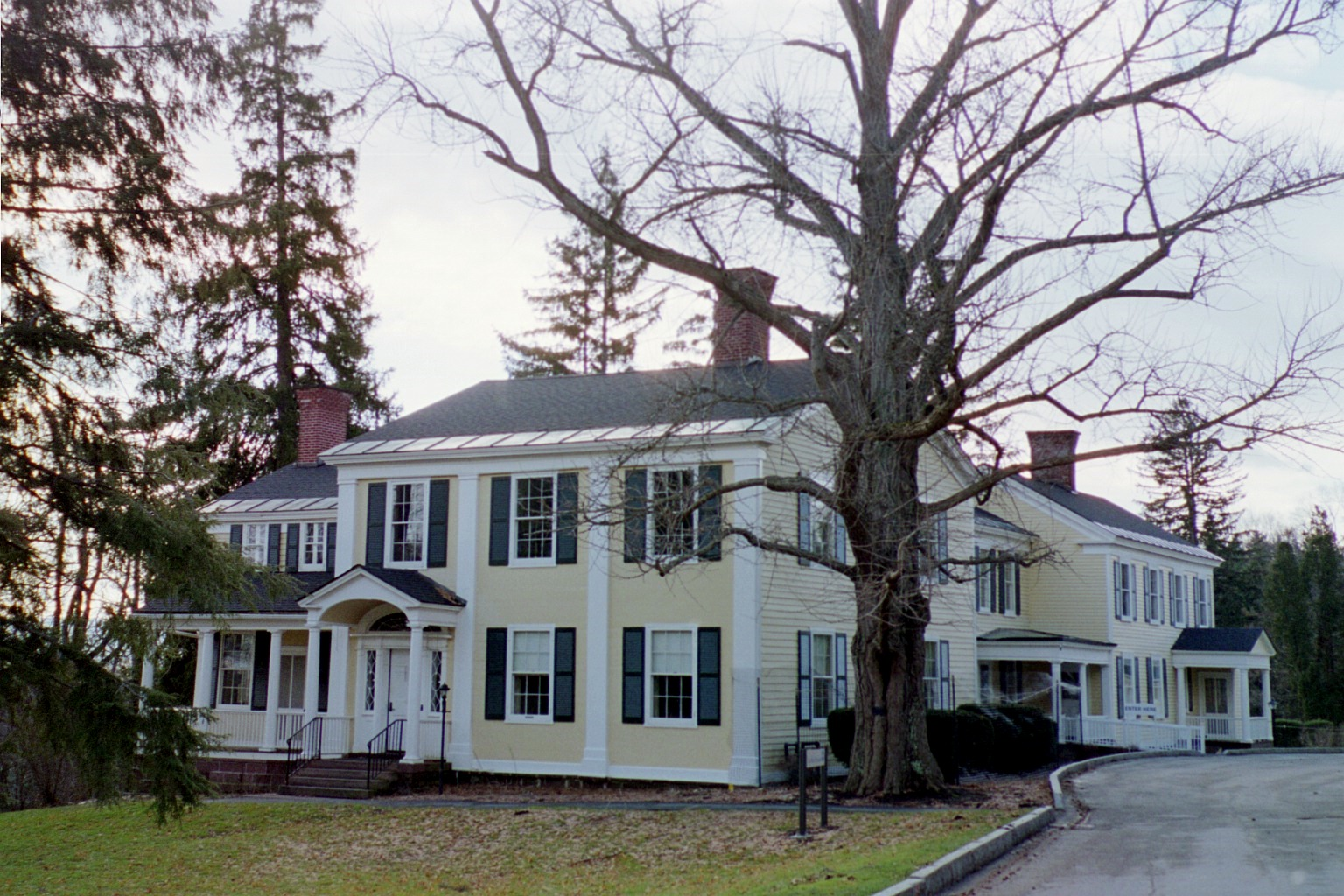

- Location within New York Location within the United States
- Location: 101 College Hill Road, Clinton, New York
- Coordinates: 43°02′59″N 75°24′17″W
- Area: 7 acres (2.8 ha)
- Built: 1817/1893
- Architectural style: Federal
- NRHP reference No.: 72000893

Significant dates
- Added to NRHP: November 28, 1972
- Designated NHL: November 28, 1972

The Elihu Root House is a historic house on College Hill Road, on the campus of Hamilton College in Clinton, New York. Built in 1817, it was the home of American statesman Elihu Root (1847-1937) from 1893 until his death. It was designated a National Historic Landmark in 1972.

== Elihu Root ==
Elihu Root was born and grew up in the immediate vicinity of this house, which became his home as an adult. He graduated from Hamilton College and the New York University School of Law. He served as both United States Attorney for the Southern District of New York and a delegate to the New York State Constitutional Convention. President William McKinley appointed him Secretary of War in 1899 and he continued in this capacity under Theodore Roosevelt. Root made many changes to the structure of the American Army, including the establishment of the U.S. Army War College and creation of the General Staff. Root was Secretary of State from 1905 to 1909. He was instrumental in improving relations with Japan and with Latin America during this time. Root also was an advocate of the World Court. He won the Nobel Peace Prize, in 1912. After leaving the cabinet, Root was a United States Senator from New York. He was a bitter critic of Woodrow Wilson.

== History ==
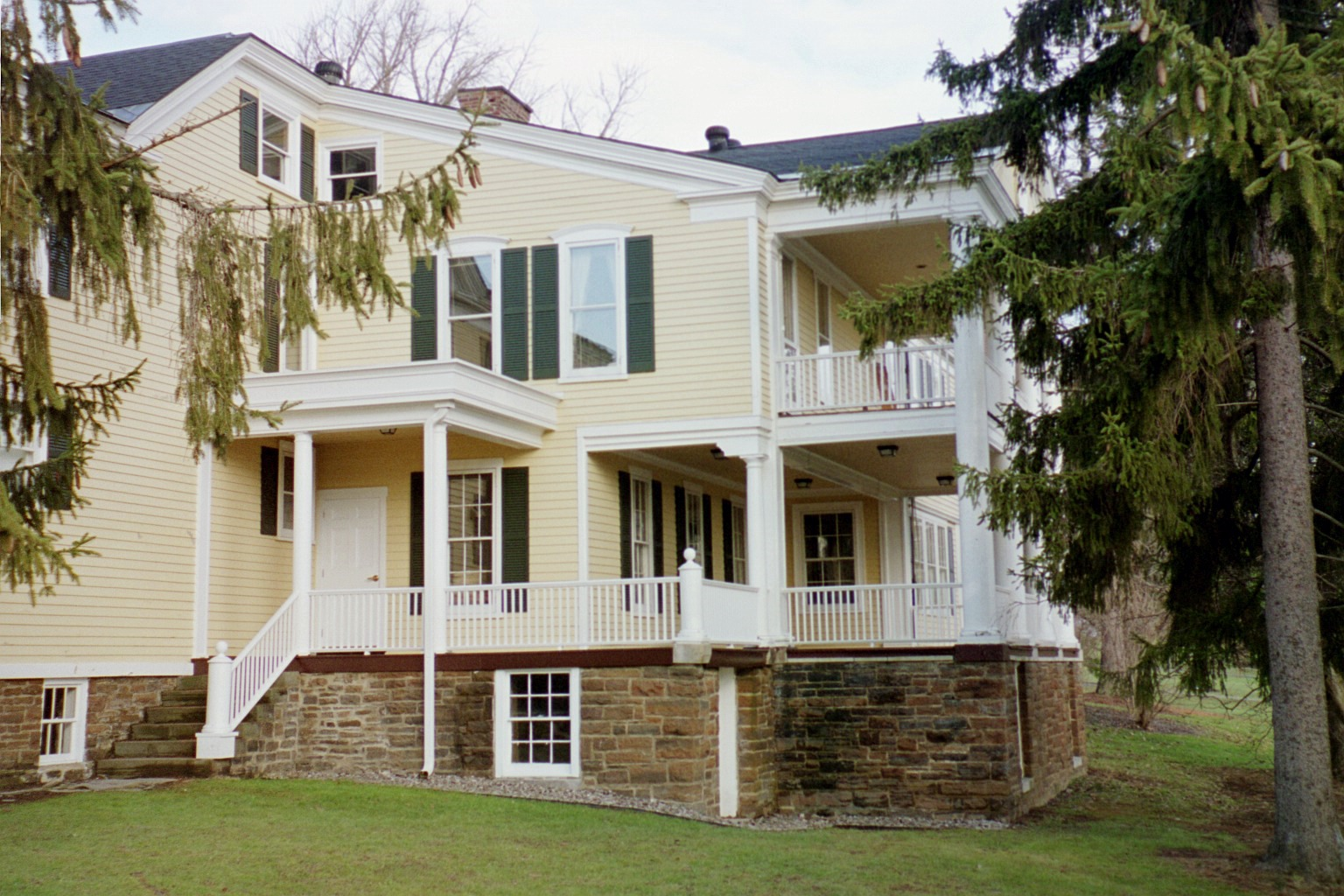
View of east (left) side of house

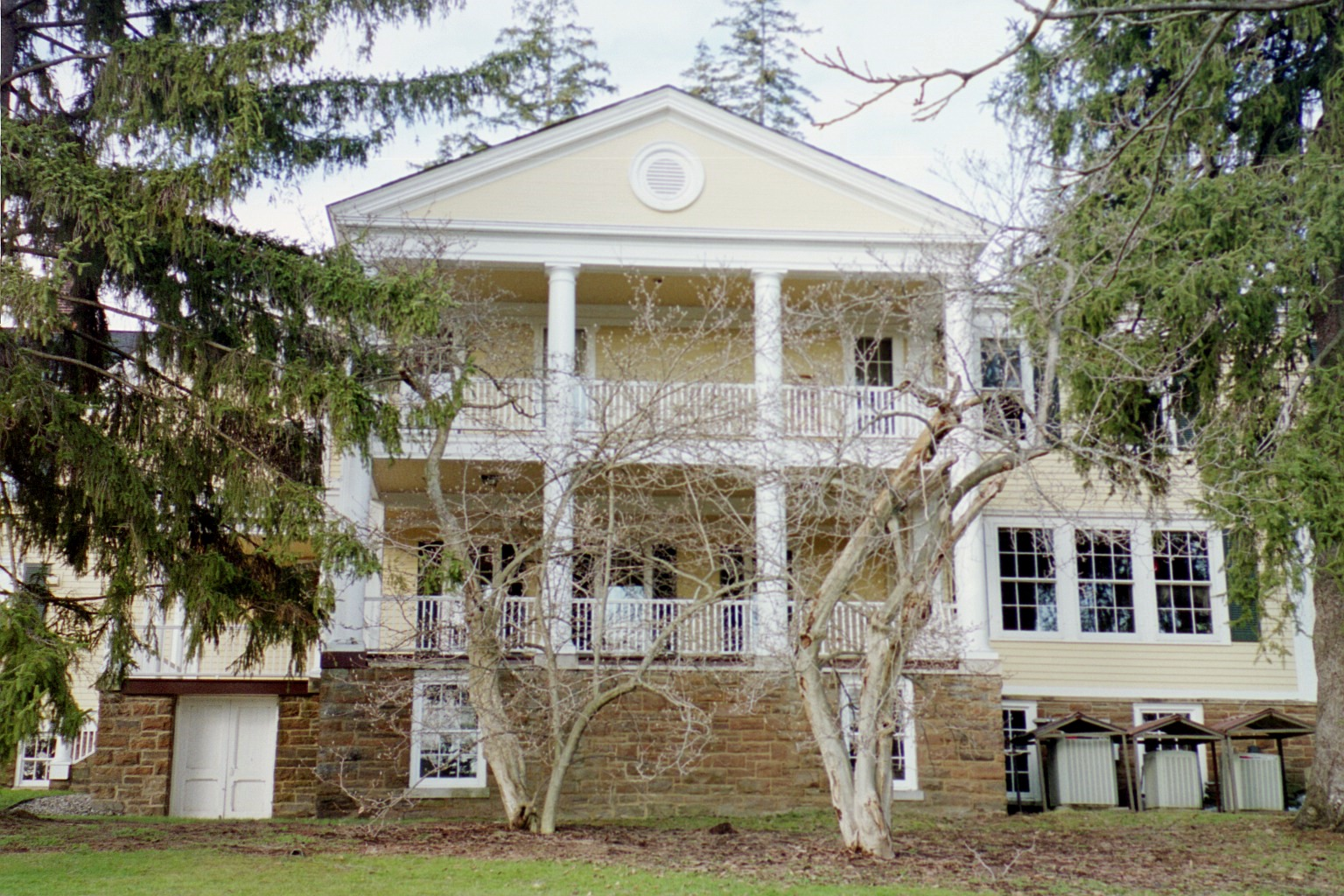
View of east portico

The Elihu Root House was also known as the Grant House due to the marriage between Root's daughter, Edith, and Ulysses S. Grant III. The Grants lived in the house after Root's death.

The main part of the Federal style house was built in 1817 as a home for a Hamilton College professor. By the time Elihu Root purchased the house in 1893, there had been many additions and modifications to the structure. A long dormitory had been added during the house's stint as a college boardinghouse. Victorian porches and a staircase were added. The wing to the east was increased from one story to two. After Mr. Root acquired the house, he replaced the Victorian porches with ones more suited to the house. He also had built the portico on the east side of the house and servants quarters at the rear of the building. Mr. Root considered the house his home until his death in 1937.

It was listed to the National Register of Historic Places and declared a National Historic Landmark in 1972, at which time it was still owned by Root's descendants.

The Elihu Root House is located on the campus of Hamilton College, an institution with which Root was affiliated throughout his life. The house was acquired by Hamilton College in 1979.
