= Gen. William Floyd House =

Historic house in New York, United States

- U.S. National Register of Historic Places
- U.S. National Historic Landmark
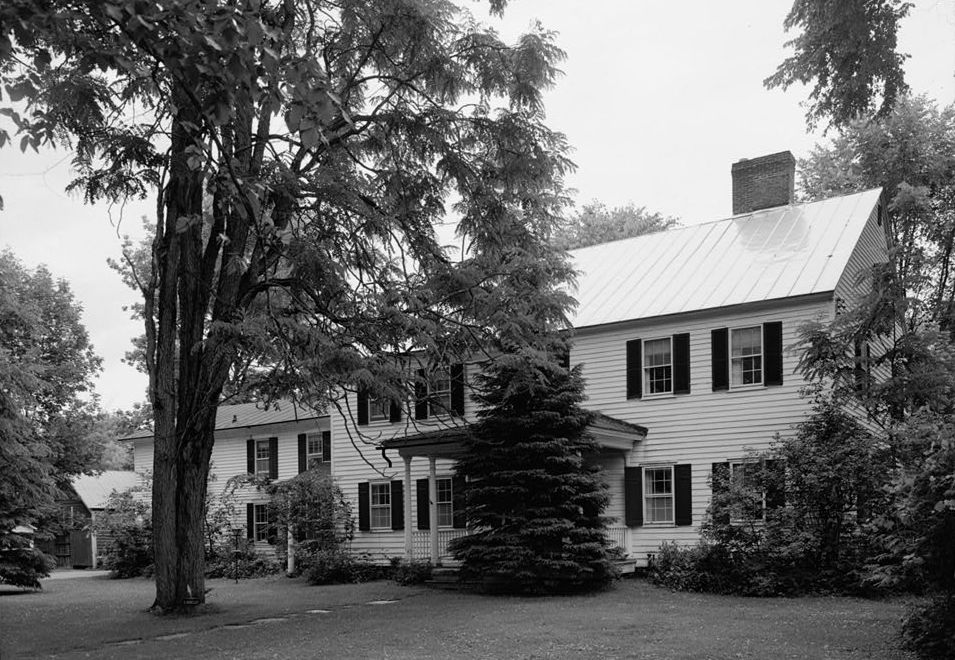
- South front of house, from southeast. HABS, 1970

- Location within New York Location within the United States
- Location: W side of Main St., Westernville, New York
- Coordinates: 43°18′22″N 75°23′2″W
- Area: less than one acre
- Built: 1803
- Architectural style: Georgian
- NRHP reference No.: 71000549

Significant dates
- Added to NRHP: June 17, 1971
- Designated NHL: July 17, 1971

The Gen. William Floyd House is a historic house on Main Street at Gifford Hill Road in Westernville, New York. Built in 1803, it was the last home of Founding Father William Floyd (1734–1821), a signer of the Declaration of Independence, and a driving force in the settlement of the area. It was declared a National Historic Landmark in 1971. The house is a private residence, and is not normally open to the public.

== Description and history ==
The Gen. William Floyd House is located in the village center of Westernville, on the west side of Main Street at its junction with Gifford Hill Road. The house's main block is a 2 1/2-story wood-frame structure, with a gabled roof, two interior chimneys and clapboarded exterior. It is oriented facing roughly southwest, with a two-story ell extending to the west. The main facade is five bays wide, with a center entrance. The interior follows a center hall plan, with the main staircase on the left side of the central, a pair of parlors to the right, and the dining room and study to the left. Preserved period elements include wide floor boards and paneled fireplace walls.

The house was built in 1803 by William Floyd, a signer of the United States Declaration of Independence. Floyd, a native of Mastic, New York, served in the New York militia during the American Revolutionary War, rising to the rank of major general. For his service, he was awarded over 10,000 acres (4,000 ha) in Upstate New York in 1787. He began developing the grant soon afterward, and moved to what is now Westernville in 1803, when this house was finished. The house remained in the hands of his descendants until 1956.

Floyd's home in Mastic, New York, still stands, and is also listed on the National Register of Historic Places. The two William Floyd houses are believed to be the only surviving homes in New York of signers of the Declaration of Independence.
