= Quarters A, Brooklyn Navy Yard =

Building in Brooklyn, New York

- U.S. National Register of Historic Places
- U.S. National Historic Landmark
- New York State Register of Historic Places
- New York City Landmark
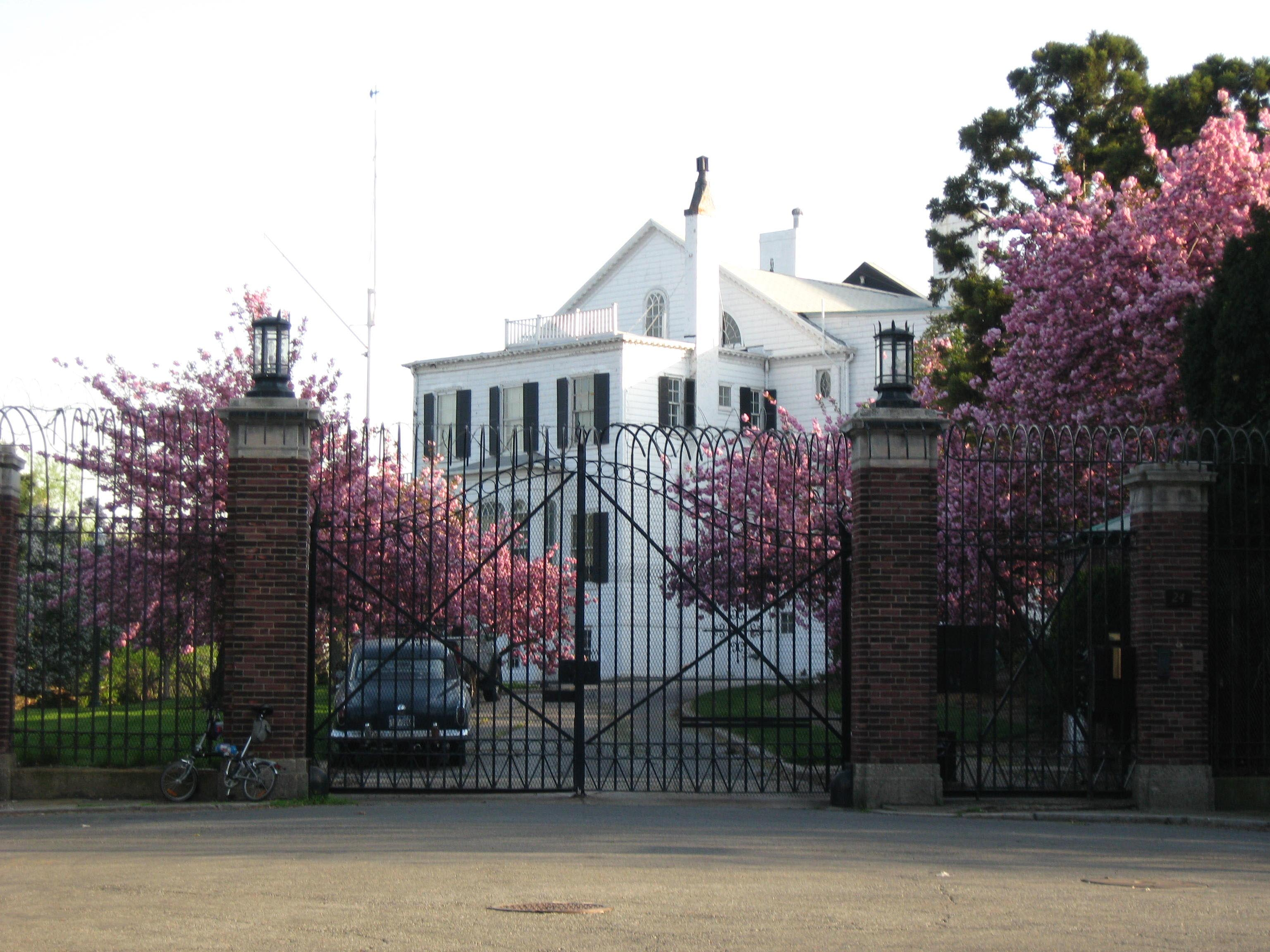
- North side in springtime
- Location: Brooklyn, New York
- Coordinates: 40°42′8.57″N 73°58′49.19″W
- Area: 3 acres (1.2 ha)
- Built: 1805
- Architect: Charles Bulfinch; John McComb, Jr.
- Architectural style: Federal
- NRHP reference No.: 74001252
- NYSRHP No.: 04701.008885
- NYCL No.: 0002

Significant dates
- Added to NRHP: May 30, 1974
- Designated NHL: May 30, 1974
- Designated NYSRHP: June 23, 1980
- Designated NYCL: October 14, 1965

Quarters A, also known as the Commandant's House, is a historic house on Evans Street in the Vinegar Hill neighborhood of Brooklyn, New York City. Built beginning in 1805, with a number of later alterations, it remains a prominent example of Federal architecture in New York City. It was designated a National Historic Landmark in 1974 for its association with Matthew C. Perry, commandant of the adjacent Brooklyn Navy Yard 1841–1843, whose opening of Japan to the West in 1854 revolutionized trade and international affairs. The building is now privately owned.

== Description and history ==
The former Commandant's House is set on a bluff overlooking the western side of the Brooklyn Navy Yard, a few blocks south of the East River. It is accessed via a gated drive at the junction of Little and Evans Streets. The house is three and a half stories in height, of wood-frame construction, and finished in wooden clapboards. The building has an extensive history of alteration, but the interior, its original main block, retains Federal period architectural details, including leaded front entry sidelight windows, carved wooden paneling, and wooden floorboards (although the latter have been covered by other flooring). The original block was built in 1805–06, supposedly to a design by Charles Bulfinch and John McComb, Jr. Additions have substantially increased the size of the house in 1860, 1904, and 1936.

It was built as the quarters for the commandant of the Brooklyn Navy Yard. Most notably, it was home to Commodore Matthew C. Perry (1794–1858) between 1841 and 1843. Perry was assigned to the yard from 1833 to 1843 in a variety of roles, during which time he is credited with improving the Navy's steamship navigation, education of enlisted men and commissioned officers, and improving the nation's lighthouse service. Perry's signature achievement was his 1854 expedition to Japan, in which he compelled the previously cloistered nation to open its borders more widely, inaugurating a series of economic and geopolitical changes.

The house was declared a National Historic Landmark in 1974, while it was still part of the active navy yard. The current owners of the Commandant's House are Charles Gilbert and Jennifer Jones, who purchased it in 1997.
