= Florence Mills House =

Historic house in Manhattan, New York

Coordinates: 40.816164°N 73.944361°W

- Formerly listed on the U.S. National Register of Historic Places
- Former U.S. National Historic Landmark
- New York State Register of Historic Places
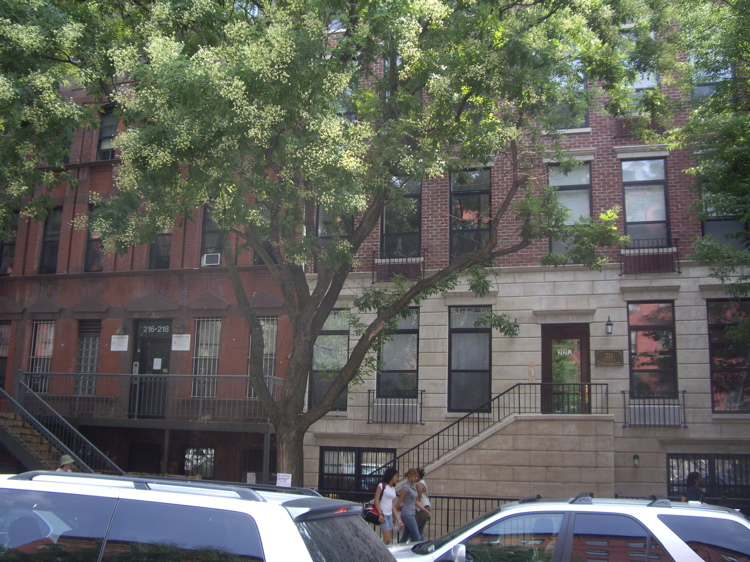
- Site on 135 Street, of house where Florence Mills was believed (incorrectly) to have lived, later demolished and replaced
- Location: 220 West 135th Street, Manhattan, New York City, New York,
- NRHP reference No.: 76001244
- NYSRHP No.: 06101.001717

Significant dates
- Added to NRHP: December 8, 1976
- Designated NHL: December 8, 1976
- Designated NYSRHP: June 23, 1980
- Removed from NRHP: January 16, 2009
- Delisted NHL: January 16, 2009

Florence Mills House is a house at 220 West 135th Street in Harlem, Manhattan, New York City. The house was originally believed to be the residence of Florence Mills, a leading African-American actress and entertainer during the 1920s. She lived at this address, or a similar address a few blocks away, during her most productive years from 1910 to 1927. The 220 West 135th Street building that existed in 1927 no longer stands and has been replaced. The site was designated a National Historic Landmark in 1976.

The designation was withdrawn in January 2009. The actual address of her home was 220 West 133rd Street; the mistake was perpetuated because a photo of the house was mislabelled as being on West 135th Street in a New York Evening Journal article at the time of her death. The 220 West 133rd Street building has also been demolished and replaced. The mistake in landmarking the West 135th Street address is acknowledged implicitly by the National Park Service, in stating that "For a number of years, this four-story row house was thought to be Mills home for most of her tragically short life."
