= List of National Historic Landmarks in New York City =

There are 117 National Historic Landmarks in New York City, including one of three national monuments. Overall, New York state has 276 National Historic Landmarks, the most of any state.

The National Historic Landmark (NHL) program is administered by the National Park Service, a branch of the Department of the Interior. The National Park Service determines which properties meet NHL criteria and makes nomination recommendations after an owner notification process. The Secretary of the Interior reviews nominations based on a set of predetermined criteria and decides on NHL designation. Both public and privately owned properties can be designated as NHLs, which provides indirect, partial protection of the historic integrity of the properties such as through tax incentives, grants, or monitoring of threats. Owners may object to the nomination of the property as an NHL. When this is the case the Secretary of the Interior can only designate a site as eligible for designation.

== Key ==
	National Historic Landmark
^{†}	National Historic Landmark District
^{#}	National Historic Site, National Historical Park, National Memorial, or National Monument
^{*}	Delisted Landmark

== National Historic Landmarks in New York City ==
	Landmark name	Image	Date designated	Location	County	Description
1	69th Regiment Armory	69th Regiment Armory	June 19, 1996 (#93001538)	Manhattan; 40°44′30″N 73°59′01″W	New York	Home of the watershed Armory Show in 1913, which introduced America to modern art
2	Admiral David Glasgow Farragut Gravesite	Admiral David Glasgow Farragut Gravesite	October 17, 2012 (#12001008)	Bronx; 40°53′32″N 73°51′57″W	Bronx	Only intact known property directly associated with Admiral David Farragut
3^{#}	African Burial Ground	African Burial Ground	April 19, 1993 (#93001597)	Manhattan; 40°42′52″N 74°00′16″W	New York	Dedicated as National Monument on October 5, 2007; burial site in Lower Manhattan of over 419 Africans from 1690s to 1794
4	Ambrose (lightship)	Ambrose (lightship)	April 11, 1989 (#84002758)	Manhattan; 40°42′17″N 74°00′09″W	New York	Lightship, several miles offshore, that marked Ambrose Channel into New York Harbor, now at South Street Seaport Museum.
5	American Stock Exchange	American Stock Exchange	June 6, 1978 (#78001867)	Manhattan; 40°42′32″N 74°00′45″W	New York	Former headquarters of the American Stock Exchange
6	Louis Armstrong House	Louis Armstrong House	May 11, 1976 (#76001265)	Corona; 40°45′16″N 73°51′42″W	Queens	Home of jazz legend Louis Armstrong for 28 years
7	Chester A. Arthur House	Chester A. Arthur House	December 12, 1965 (#66000534)	Manhattan; 40°44′34″N 73°58′56″W	New York	Home of President Chester A. Arthur; site of his inaugural oath
8	Alice Austen House	Alice Austen House	April 19, 1993 (#70000925)	Rosebank; 40°36′54″N 74°03′47″W	Richmond	Home of photographer Alice Austen, now a museum
9	Bartow–Pell Mansion	Bartow–Pell Mansion	December 8, 1976 (#74001220)	Pelham Bay Park; 40°52′18″N 73°48′20″W	Bronx	19th-century mansion in largest New York City park
10	Bayard-Condict Building	Bayard-Condict Building	December 8, 1976 (#76001236)	Manhattan; 40°43′35″N 73°59′44″W	New York	Only Louis Sullivan building in New York City; one of the first steel skeleton skyscrapers.
11	Bell Laboratories Building	Bell Laboratories Building	May 15, 1975 (#75001202)	Manhattan; 40°44′13″N 74°00′36″W	New York	Bell Labs work here included experimental phonograph record, vacuum tubes, talking movies (1923), black and white and color TV, radar, and early commercial remote broadcasts. Today home to the Westbeth Artists Community (listed separately on the National Register of Historic Places).
12	Brooklyn Bridge	Brooklyn Bridge	January 29, 1964 (#66000523)	Brooklyn and Manhattan; 40°42′23″N 73°59′51″W	Kings and New York	The first steel wire suspension bridge; at one point the largest in the world
13^{†}	Brooklyn Heights Historic District	Brooklyn Heights Historic District	January 12, 1965 (#66000524)	Brooklyn; 40°41′48″N 73°59′48″W	Kings	Exemplary collection of 19th-century architectural styles; first historic district in New York City
14	Brooklyn Historical Society	Brooklyn Historical Society	July 17, 1991 (#91002054)	Brooklyn; 40°41′41″N 73°59′34″W	Kings	One of the few remaining buildings by George B. Post; innovative structural system
15	Ralph Johnson Bunche House	Ralph Johnson Bunche House	May 11, 1976 (#76001266)	Kew Gardens; 40°42′23″N 73°50′13″W	Queens	Home of Ralph Johnson Bunche, eminent African-American diplomat and Undersecretary General of United Nations
16	Carnegie Hall	Carnegie Hall	December 29, 1962 (#66000535)	Manhattan; 40°45′54″N 73°58′49″W	New York	One of the most famous music venues in the world
17	Andrew Carnegie Mansion	Andrew Carnegie Mansion	November 13, 1966 (#66000536)	Manhattan; 40°47′04″N 73°57′28″W	New York	Home of Andrew Carnegie, now the Cooper-Hewitt, National Design Museum
18	Central Park	Central Park	May 23, 1963 (#66000538)	Manhattan; 40°46′55″N 73°57′58″W	New York	The Green Lung of the city; one of the most visited city parks in the world; designed by Frederick Law Olmsted and Calvert Vaux.
19	Central Synagogue	Central Synagogue	May 15, 1970 (#70000423)	Manhattan; 40°45′35″N 73°58′14″W	New York	Oldest synagogue continuously in use by a New York City Jewish congregation; built in a Moorish Revival style to recognize importance of that period in Jewish history
20	Chamber of Commerce Building	Chamber of Commerce Building	December 22, 1977 (#73001214)	Manhattan; 40°42′34″N 74°00′36″W	New York	Former home of the Chamber of Commerce of the State of New York, established in 1768; prototype for the chamber of commerce
21	Chrysler Building	Chrysler Building	December 8, 1976 (#76001237)	Manhattan; 40°45′06″N 73°58′31″W	New York	Art Deco skyscraper; distinctive feature of Manhattan skyline; at one point world's tallest building
22	Church of the Ascension	Church of the Ascension	December 23, 1987 (#87002593)	Manhattan; 40°44′01″N 73°59′44″W	New York	Early church design by Richard Upjohn; valuable interior artwork
23	City Hall	City Hall	December 19, 1960 (#66000539)	Manhattan; 40°42′46″N 74°00′21″W	New York	Oldest city hall in U.S. still in use as main municipal government building
24	Conference House	Conference House	May 23, 1966 (#66000566)	Tottenville; 40°30′11″N 74°15′11″W	Richmond	Only surviving pre-Revolutionary War manor house in New York City; site of unsuccessful peace conference in 1776
25	Will Marion Cook House	Will Marion Cook House	May 11, 1976 (#76001238)	Manhattan; 40°49′05″N 73°56′35″W	New York	Home of the leading black composer and musician Will Marion Cook
26	Cooper Union	Cooper Union	July 4, 1961 (#66000540)	Manhattan; 40°43′46″N 73°59′26″W	New York	Pioneering adult education center; site of famous anti-slavery speech by Abraham Lincoln
27	Croton Aqueduct (Old)	Croton Aqueduct (Old)	April 27, 1992 (#74001324)	Croton River, Westchester, to Highbridge Park, Manhattan; 41°13′35″N 73°51′19″W	New York, Bronx, Westchester	Large and complex water supply system for New York City; constructed between 1837 and 1842
28	Daily News Building	Daily News Building	June 29, 1989 (#82001191)	Manhattan; 40°44′58″N 73°58′25″W	New York	First modern free-standing skyscraper designed by Raymond Hood
29	Dakota Apartments	Dakota Apartments	December 8, 1976 (#72000869)	Manhattan; 40°46′36″N 73°58′35″W	New York	Combination of Renaissance architectural styles by Henry Hardenbergh; setting for Rosemary's Baby and the shooting death of John Lennon
30	Dyckman House	Dyckman House	December 24, 1967 (#67000014)	Manhattan; 40°52′03″N 73°55′24″W	New York	Only remaining farmhouse in Manhattan
31	Eldridge Street Synagogue	Eldridge Street Synagogue	June 19, 1996 (#80002687)	Manhattan; 40°42′54″N 73°59′38″W	New York	One of the oldest synagogues in the U.S.; first built by Jews from Eastern Europe
32	Duke Ellington House	Duke Ellington House	May 11, 1976 (#76001239)	Manhattan; 40°49′56″N 73°56′27″W	New York	Ellington, the legendary jazz composer and bandleader, lived in Apartment 4A from 1939 to 1961
33	Empire State Building	Empire State Building	June 24, 1986 (#82001192)	Manhattan; 40°44′54″N 73°59′08″W	New York	World's tallest building from 1931 to 1972 and internationally recognized symbol of New York City
34	Equitable Building	Equitable Building	June 2, 1978 (#78001869)	Manhattan; 40°42′35″N 74°00′40″W	New York	One of the earliest skyscrapers in Manhattan; profoundly influenced later skyscraper design
35	Hamilton Fish House	Hamilton Fish House	May 15, 1975 (#72001456)	Manhattan; 40°43′48″N 73°59′19″W	New York	Home of Hamilton Fish, future Governor and Senator of New York
36	Flatiron Building	Flatiron Building	June 29, 1989 (#79001603)	Manhattan; 40°44′28″N 73°59′23″W	New York	Distinctive triangular building at Madison Square.
37	Founder's Hall, The Rockefeller University	Founder's Hall, The Rockefeller University	May 30, 1974 (#74001269)	Manhattan; 40°45′45″N 73°57′18″W	New York	Building marked the start of John D. Rockefeller Jr.'s putting the vast family fortune to philanthropic purposes
38	The Frick Collection and Frick Art Reference Library Building	The Frick Collection and Frick Art Reference Library Building	October 6, 2008 (#08001091)	Manhattan; 40°46′17″N 73°58′02″W	New York	
39^{#}	Governors Island	Governors Island	February 4, 1985 (#85002435)	Manhattan; 40°41′29″N 74°00′58″W	New York	Island in NY Harbor which served various branches of the US Military from 1783 until the late 1990s; now a park
40	Grace Church	Grace Church	December 22, 1977 (#74001270)	Manhattan; 40°43′54″N 73°59′31″W	New York	Gothic Revival masterpiece designed by James Renwick Jr.
41	Grand Central Terminal	Grand Central Terminal	December 8, 1976 (#75001206)	Manhattan; 40°45′10″N 73°58′35″W	New York	Beaux-Arts architecture; historic rail gateway to New York City; largest train station in the world by number of platforms
42^{†}	Green-Wood Cemetery	Green-Wood Cemetery	September 20, 2006 (#97000228)	Brooklyn; 40°39′08″N 73°59′28″W	Kings	Popular tourist attraction in the 1850s; most famous New Yorkers who died during the second half of the nineteenth century buried here
43^{#}	Hamilton Grange National Memorial	Hamilton Grange National Memorial	December 19, 1960 (#66000097)	Manhattan; 40°49′17″N 73°56′50″W	New York	Home of Alexander Hamilton: military officer, lawyer, member of the United States Constitutional Convention, American statesman, first United States Secretary of the Treasury, and Founding Father
44	Solomon R. Guggenheim Museum	Solomon R. Guggenheim Museum	October 6, 2008 (#05000443)	Manhattan; 40°46′58″N 73°57′32″W	New York	The only museum designed by Frank Lloyd Wright
45	Henry Street Settlement and Neighborhood Playhouse	Henry Street Settlement and Neighborhood Playhouse	May 30, 1974 (#74001272)	Manhattan; 40°42′50″N 73°59′07″W	New York	One of the nation's first settlement homes where new immigrants and the poor could find assistance
46	Matthew Henson Residence	Matthew Henson Residence	May 15, 1975 (#75001207)	Manhattan; 40°49′32″N 73°56′20″W	New York	Home of Matthew Henson, African-American polar explorer who may have been the first to reach the North Pole
47	Hispanic Society of America	Hispanic Society of America	October 17, 2012 (#12001009)	Manhattan; 40°50′01″N 73°56′47″W	New York	Museum of Iberian art and artifacts; located in Audubon Terrace, a NRHP historic district
48	Holland Tunnel	Holland Tunnel	November 4, 1993 (#93001619)	Manhattan; 40°43′39″N 74°01′17″W	New York	Tunnel underneath the Hudson River, connecting Manhattan and New Jersey; civil engineering landmark; one of the earliest ventilated tunnels
49	USS Intrepid	USS Intrepid	January 14, 1986 (#86000082)	Manhattan; 40°45′53″N 74°00′04″W	New York	One of the most active U.S. ships during World War II; today the Intrepid Museum moored along the West Side
50	James Weldon Johnson Residence	James Weldon Johnson Residence	May 11, 1976 (#76001241)	Manhattan; 40°48′55″N 73°56′35″W	New York	Harlem home of African-American artist-activist James Weldon Johnson
51	King Manor	King Manor	December 2, 1974 (#74001295)	Jamaica; 40°42′11″N 73°48′14″W	Queens	Home of Rufus King, a signer of Declaration of Independence and early U.S. Senator from New York
52	Lettie G. Howard (schooner)	Lettie G. Howard (schooner)	April 11, 1989 (#84002779)	Manhattan; 40°42′22″N 74°00′12″W	New York	Last remaining Fredonia-type schooner (once the standard for American fishing boats) at the South Street Seaport
53	Lorillard Snuff Mill	Lorillard Snuff Mill	December 22, 1977 (#77000935)	New York Botanical Garden; 40°51′35″N 73°52′34″W	Bronx	Oldest existing tobacco-manufacturing facility in U.S.
54	Low Memorial Library	Low Memorial Library	December 23, 1987 (#87002599)	Columbia University; 40°48′30″N 73°57′43″W	New York	First building on Morningside Heights campus; capped by largest freestanding granite dome in U.S.
55	R. H. Macy and Company Store (Macy's)	R. H. Macy and Company Store (Macy's)	June 2, 1978 (#78001873)	Manhattan; 40°45′01″N 73°59′18″W	New York	Largest department store in world for many years
56	McGraw-Hill Building	McGraw-Hill Building	June 29, 1989 (#80002701)	Manhattan; 40°45′26″N 73°59′28″W	New York	Early Art Deco building; first U.S. building in International Style
57	Claude McKay Residence	Claude McKay Residence	December 8, 1976 (#76002143)	Manhattan; 40°48′51″N 73°56′30″W	New York	The Harlem YMCA, whose residents included African-American writer Claude McKay
58	Metropolitan Life Insurance Company Tower	Metropolitan Life Insurance Company Tower	June 2, 1978 (#78001874)	Manhattan; 40°44′28″N 73°59′15″W	New York	Tallest building in the world 1909-13; still part of the skyline a century later
59	Metropolitan Museum of Art	Metropolitan Museum of Art	June 24, 1986 (#86003556)	Manhattan; 40°46′44″N 73°57′49″W	New York	The Fifth Avenue building of the Metropolitan Museum of Art, one of the world's most important and prestigious art museums
60	J. Pierpont Morgan Library	J. Pierpont Morgan Library	November 13, 1966 (#66000544)	Manhattan; 40°44′56″N 73°58′54″W	New York	Office, Library, and now Museum of J. P. Morgan; the Panic of 1907 ended in the Library
61	Morris-Jumel Mansion	Morris-Jumel Mansion	January 20, 1961 (#66000545)	Manhattan; 40°50′04″N 73°56′19″W	New York	Oldest residential building in Manhattan
62	National City Bank Building	National City Bank Building	June 2, 1978 (#78001875)	Manhattan; 40°42′22″N 74°00′33″W	New York	Home to one of the country's largest and most important banks since 1908
63	New York Amsterdam News Building	New York Amsterdam News Building	May 11, 1976 (#76001247)	Manhattan; 40°48′54″N 73°56′41″W	New York	Influential black newspaper the New York Amsterdam News was published here 1916-38
64^{†}	New York Botanical Garden	New York Botanical Garden	May 28, 1967 (#67000009)	Bronx; 40°51′49″N 73°52′42″W	Bronx	One of the world's leading botanical gardens, with the largest herbarium in the U.S. and second largest in the world after the French National Museum of Natural History and home to many plant laboratories
65	New York Cotton Exchange	New York Cotton Exchange	December 22, 1977 (#72001586)	Manhattan; 40°42′16″N 74°00′37″W	New York	First commodity market in the U.S.; now 1 Hanover Square
66	New York Life Building	New York Life Building	June 2, 1978 (#78001876)	Manhattan; 40°44′34″N 73°59′08″W	New York	Last significant Cass Gilbert skyscraper in Manhattan
67	New York Public Library	New York Public Library	December 21, 1965 (#66000546)	Manhattan; 40°45′12″N 73°58′56″W	New York	One of the largest and most important libraries in the U.S.; listing is for main branch building.
68	New York Stock Exchange	New York Stock Exchange	June 2, 1978 (#78001877)	Manhattan; 40°42′25″N 74°00′40″W	New York	One of the first securities markets in the U.S.; still the world's largest
69	New York Studio School of Drawing, Painting and Sculpture	New York Studio School of Drawing, Painting and Sculpture	April 27, 1992 (#92001877)	Manhattan; 40°43′59″N 73°59′54″W	New York	Original home of the Whitney Museum, the first devoted to 20th-century American art
70	New York Yacht Club	New York Yacht Club	May 28, 1987 (#82001203)	Manhattan; 40°45′20″N 73°58′54″W	New York	Oldest yachting club in U.S.; longtime home of the America's Cup
71	Old Merchant's House	Old Merchant's House	June 23, 1965 (#66000548)	Manhattan; 40°43′39″N 73°59′33″W	New York	Nineteenth-century family home; preserved inside and out
72	Old Quaker Meeting House	Old Quaker Meeting House	December 24, 1967 (#67000015)	Flushing; 40°45′47″N 73°49′49″W	Queens	Only surviving 17th-century ecclesiastical frame building in New York; in almost continuous use since 1696
73	Philosophy Hall	Philosophy Hall	July 21, 2003 (#03001046)	Columbia University; 40°48′22″N 73°57′45″W	New York	Edwin Armstrong developed FM radio in this Columbia University building
74	Players Club	Players Club	December 19, 1962 (#66000549)	Manhattan; 40°44′15″N 73°59′13″W	New York	Extensive collection of art and theater memorabilia; interior redone by Stanford White
75	Plaza Hotel	Plaza Hotel	June 24, 1986 (#78001878)	Manhattan; 40°45′53″N 73°58′28″W	New York	French Renaissance-style building; outstanding example of American hotel architecture; symbol of elegance; visible from much of lower Central Park; setting for Kay Thompson's popular Eloise series of children's books
76	Plymouth Church of the Pilgrims	Plymouth Church of the Pilgrims	July 4, 1961 (#66000525)	Brooklyn; 40°41′57″N 73°59′37″W	Kings	Important station on Underground Railroad when Henry Ward Beecher was pastor
77	Pupin Physics Laboratory, Columbia University	Pupin Physics Laboratory, Columbia University	December 21, 1965 (#66000550)	Columbia University; 40°48′36″N 73°57′42″W	New York	Columbia University building; site of first splitting of uranium atom in U.S. and other milestones in development of atomic bomb
78	Quarters A, Brooklyn Navy Yard	Quarters A, Brooklyn Navy Yard	May 30, 1974 (#74001252)	Brooklyn; 40°42′09″N 73°58′52″W	Kings	Home to Matthew Perry at the time of his opening of Japan
79	Paul Robeson Home	Paul Robeson Home	December 8, 1976 (#76001248)	Manhattan; 40°50′04″N 73°56′20″W	New York	Home of legendary African-American actor and activist Paul Robeson
80	Jackie Robinson House	Jackie Robinson House	May 11, 1976 (#76001226)	Brooklyn; 40°38′54″N 73°54′54″W	Kings	Home of baseball great Jackie Robinson
81	Rockefeller Center	Rockefeller Center	December 23, 1987 (#87002591)	Manhattan; 40°45′31″N 73°58′45″W	New York	Successful urban planning project of 20th-century America; changed Midtown Manhattan; originating site of popular NBC television programs Today and Saturday Night Live
82^{†}	Sailors' Snug Harbor	Sailors' Snug Harbor	December 8, 1976 (#72000909)	Sailors' Snug Harbor; 40°38′33″N 74°06′10″W	Richmond	First and only home for retired merchant seamen in U.S.
83	St. Ann and the Holy Trinity Church	St. Ann and the Holy Trinity Church	December 23, 1987 (#87002590)	Brooklyn; 40°41′40″N 73°59′35″W	Kings	Site of first figural stained-glass windows in U.S.
84	St. George's Episcopal Church	St. George's Episcopal Church	December 8, 1976 (#76001249)	Manhattan; 40°44′04″N 73°59′06″W	New York	Home church of Harry Thacker Burleigh, African-American singer who helped establish the spiritual in the liturgy of many American faiths
85	St. Patrick's Cathedral	St. Patrick's Cathedral	December 8, 1976 (#76001250)	Manhattan; 40°45′31″N 73°58′35″W	New York	First large-scale medieval-style church built in U.S.
86	St. Paul's Chapel	St. Paul's Chapel	October 9, 1960 (#66000551)	Manhattan; 40°42′41″N 74°00′36″W	New York	One of the few surviving colonial-era churches in city; George Washington worshipped here following his inauguration; site of informal memorials following September 11 attacks
87	Margaret Sanger Clinic	Margaret Sanger Clinic	September 14, 1993 (#93001599)	Manhattan; 40°44′17″N 73°59′39″W	New York	Clinic where Margaret Sanger dispensed birth control
88	Schomburg Center for Research in Black Culture	Schomburg Center for Research in Black Culture	December 23, 2016 (#100000798)	Harlem; 40°48′52″N 73°56′29″W	New York	Research library of the New York Public Library (NYPL) and an archive repository for information on people of African descent worldwide.
89	Gen. Winfield Scott House	Gen. Winfield Scott House	November 7, 1973 (#73001222)	Manhattan; 40°44′06″N 73°59′45″W	New York	Home of Winfield Scott, heroic general in the U.S.-Mexican War and later presidential candidate
90	Seventh Regiment Armory	Seventh Regiment Armory	February 24, 1986 (#75001208)	Manhattan; 40°46′03″N 73°57′58″W	New York	One of the most impressive collections of 1880s interior decoration outside of a museum; only armory actually owned by the unit for which it was constructed
91	Harry F. Sinclair House	Harry F. Sinclair House	June 2, 1978 (#78001882)	Manhattan; 40°46′36″N 73°57′49″W	New York	Harry F. Sinclair, the oil industrialist, lived here from 1918 to 1930; now part of the Ukrainian Institute; often used in filmmaking and television production
92	Alfred E. Smith House	Alfred E. Smith House	November 28, 1972 (#72000882)	Manhattan; 40°42′48″N 73°59′53″W	New York	Home of four-time New York State governor Alfred E. Smith (and later presidential candidate) from 1907 to 1923
93^{†}	SoHo-Cast Iron Historic District	SoHo-Cast Iron Historic District	June 2, 1978 (#78001883)	Manhattan; 40°43′28″N 74°00′05″W	New York	Believed to be the largest existing collection of late 19th-century cast iron facades in the world
94	A. T. Stewart Company Store	A. T. Stewart Company Store	June 2, 1978 (#78001885)	Manhattan; 40°42′51″N 74°00′22″W	New York	Site of the first American department store (later known as the "New York Sun Building"; now a New York City government building)
95	Stonewall	Stonewall	February 16, 2000 (#99000562)	Manhattan; 40°44′02″N 74°00′08″W	New York	Site of 1969 Stonewall riots which began gay rights movement
96	St. Bartholomew's Church and Community House	St. Bartholomew's Church and Community House	October 31, 2016 (#80002719)	Midtown Manhattan; 40°45′26″N 73°58′25″W	New York	A pivotal example of the work of Bertram Grosvenor Goodhue and an outstanding example of early 20th-century ecclesiastical architecture.
97	Surrogate's Court	Surrogate's Court	December 22, 1977 (#72000888)	Manhattan; 40°42′49″N 74°00′17″W	New York	Probate Courthouse across from City Hall
98^{#}	Tenement Building at 97 Orchard Street	Tenement Building at 97 Orchard Street	April 19, 1994 (#92000556)	Manhattan; 40°43′07″N 73°59′25″W	New York	Preserved tenement building that housed hundreds of immigrants; now the heart of the Lower East Side Tenement Museum.
99	Third Judicial District Courthouse	Third Judicial District Courthouse	December 22, 1977 (#72000875)	Manhattan; 40°44′05″N 73°59′57″W	New York	Originally built as the Third Judicial District Courthouse; faced with demolition, public outcry led to its reuse as a branch of the New York Public Library
100	Tiffany and Company Building	Tiffany and Company Building	June 2, 1978 (#78001886)	Manhattan; 40°45′00″N 73°58′53″W	New York	Served as the home of Tiffany and Company from 1905 through 1940
101	Samuel J. Tilden House	Samuel J. Tilden House	May 11, 1976 (#76001251)	Manhattan; 40°44′15″N 73°59′14″W	New York	Home of Samuel J. Tilden, former New York State governor and loser of the bitter 1876 presidential election
102	The Town Hall	The Town Hall	March 2, 2012 (#80002724)	Manhattan; 40.755986°N 73.984712°W; 40°45′22″N 73°59′05″W	New York	"America's Town Meetings of the Air" radio programs from here in the 1930s created public-affairs media.
103	Triangle Shirtwaist Factory	Triangle Shirtwaist Factory	July 17, 1971 (#91002050)	Manhattan; 40°43′48″N 73°59′45″W	New York	Site of the Triangle Shirtwaist Factory fire, one of the worst industrial disasters in the U.S., which led to many workplace reforms
104	Trinity Church	Trinity Church	December 8, 1976 (#76001252)	Manhattan; 40°42′29″N 74°00′44″W	New York	Historic church which looks down Wall Street
105	Old New York County Courthouse	Old New York County Courthouse	May 11, 1976 (#74001277)	Manhattan; 40°42′47″N 74°00′22″W	New York	Historic courthouse, more commonly known as the Tweed Courthouse, connected to Tammany Hall, now used by NYC's Department of Education
106	Union Square	Union Square	December 9, 1997 (#97001678)	Manhattan; 40°44′08″N 73°59′26″W	New York	The political heart of Manhattan; many protests begin or end here
107	United Charities Building	United Charities Building	July 17, 1991 (#85000661)	Manhattan; 40°44′22″N 73°59′11″W	New York	Built in 1893 by a wealthy businessman in order to provide his favorite charities a low cost location for their operations
108	United Workers Cooperatives	United Workers Cooperatives	July 17, 1991 (#86002518)	Bronx; 40°51′59″N 73°52′11″W	Bronx	Built in 1926 by the United Workers' Association to improve the living standards of its members, many of whom lived in squalid conditions in the tenements of the Lower East Side
109	U.S. Customhouse	U.S. Customhouse	December 8, 1976 (#72000889)	Manhattan; 40°42′15″N 74°00′50″W	New York	Cass Gilbert designed Customhouse for New York Harbor; now part of the Smithsonian Institution
110	University Heights Campus (Bronx Community College of the City University of New York)	University Heights Campus (Bronx Community College of the City University of New York)	October 17, 2012 (#12001013)	Bronx; 40°51′28″N 73°54′44″W	Bronx	Collection of Beaux Arts buildings by Stanford White is one of the best examples of that style anywhere.
111	Van Cortlandt House	Van Cortlandt House	December 24, 1976 (#67000010)	Van Cortlandt Park; 40°53′24″N 73°53′47″W	Bronx	Mansion for the Van Cortlandt family built in 1748 and used during the American Revolution
112	Voorlezer's House	Voorlezer's House	November 5, 1961 (#66000565)	Richmondtown; 40°34′17″N 74°08′51″W	Richmond	Oldest known surviving schoolhouse in America; owned by the Staten Island Historical Society
113	Wards Point Archeological Site	Wards Point Archeological Site	April 19, 1993 (#93000609)	Tottenville; 40°29′56″N 74°15′07″W	Richmond	Archaeological site in Conference House Park containing prehistoric remains.
114^{†}	Woodlawn Cemetery	Woodlawn Cemetery	June 23, 2011 (#11000563)	Bronx; 40°53′21″N 73°52′24″W	Bronx	Illustrates transition from rural cemetery to 20th-century styles; notable dead buried here include Robert Moses and R.H. Macy
115	Woolworth Building	Woolworth Building	November 13, 1966 (#66000554)	Manhattan; 40°42′44″N 74°00′29″W	New York	One of the oldest — and most famous — skyscrapers in New York City; still one of the tallest buildings in New York City
116	Wyckoff House	Wyckoff House	December 24, 1967 (#67000013)	Brooklyn; 40°38′40″N 73°55′15″W	Kings	Oldest surviving Dutch saltbox frame house in America
117	Wyckoff-Bennett Homestead	Wyckoff-Bennett Homestead	December 24, 1976 (#74001253)	Brooklyn; 40°36′39″N 73°57′05″W	Kings	Housed Hessian soldiers during the American Revolution

== New York City Designated Historic Sites ==
The New York City Landmarks Preservation Commission was created following the preservation fight and subsequent demolition of Pennsylvania Station. New York City's right to limit owners' ability to convert landmarked buildings was upheld by the U.S. Supreme Court in 1978. Many of the NYC NHLs are listed, either individually or as part of historic districts, in the List of New York City Designated Landmarks.

== National Monuments in Manhattan ==
There are nine National Monuments, National Memorials or National Historic Sites in New York City (all but the Statue of Liberty and Castle Clinton are also National Historic Landmarks):

- African Burial Ground National Monument, declared February 27, 2006
- Governors Island National Monument, declared January 19, 2001
- Statue of Liberty National Monument, declared October 15, 1924
- Stonewall National Monument, declared June 24, 2016
- Federal Hall National Memorial
- General Grant National Memorial (Grant's Tomb)
- Castle Clinton National Monument
- Hamilton Grange National Memorial
- Theodore Roosevelt Birthplace National Historic Site

== Former National Historic Landmarks in New York City ==
	Landmark name	Image	Date of designation	Date of move or dedesignation	Location	County	Description
1	Florence Mills House		December 8, 1976	January 26, 2009	Manhattan	New York	Site of what the National Park Service believed to be the home of Florence Mills, popular African-American singer and actress in the 1920s. The wrong house was listed in error, and the proper house was demolished. The National Park Service withdrew the landmark designation in 2009.
2	Jacob Riis House		November 24, 1968	1973	Richmond Hill	Queens	Home of social activist Jacob Riis; demolished in 1973.

== See also ==
- List of National Historic Landmarks in New York
- List of National Historic Landmarks by state
- National Register of Historic Places listings in Manhattan
- National Register of Historic Places listings in the Bronx
- National Register of Historic Places listings in Brooklyn
- National Register of Historic Places listings in Queens, New York
- National Register of Historic Places listings in Staten Island
- List of New York City Designated Landmarks
