= New York Amsterdam News Building =

- U.S. National Register of Historic Places
- U.S. National Historic Landmark
- New York State Register of Historic Places
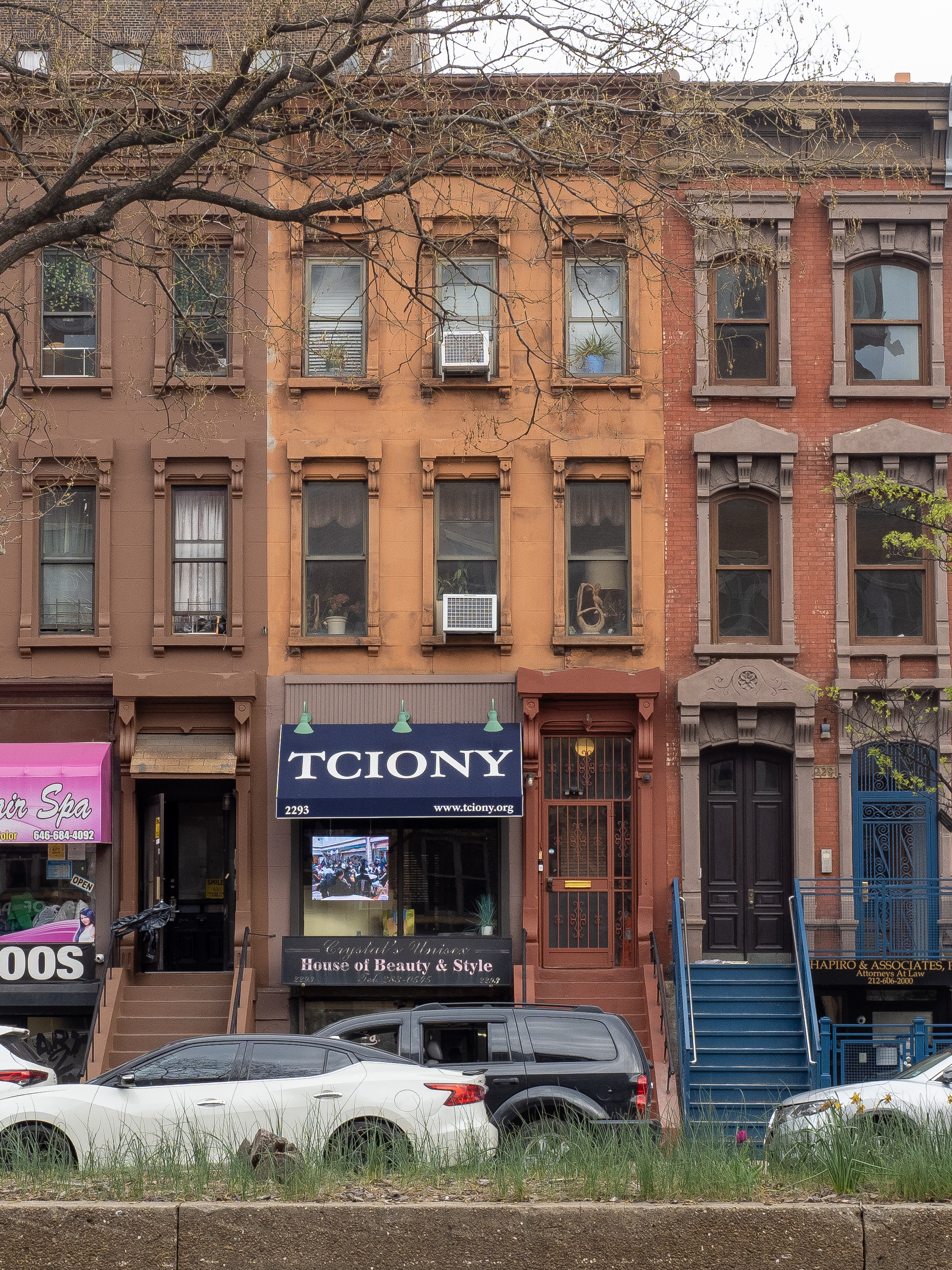

- Location within Manhattan Location within New York Location within the United States
- Location: 2293 Seventh Avenue, Harlem, Manhattan, New York City, New York
- Coordinates: 40°48′53.8″N 73°56′41″W
- Area: less than one acre
- Built: unknown
- Architectural style: Greek Revival
- NRHP reference No.: 76001247
- NYSRHP No.: 06101.001752

Significant dates
- Added to NRHP: May 11, 1976
- Designated NHL: May 11, 1976
- Designated NYSRHP: June 23, 1980

The New York Amsterdam News Building is a historic rowhouse at 2293 Seventh Avenue in the Harlem neighborhood of Manhattan in New York City. It is historically significant as the publishing home of the New York Amsterdam News between 1916 and 1938. During this period, the newspaper became one of the nation's most influential publications covering African-American issues. It was designated a National Historic Landmark in 1976. The Amsterdam News now publishes out of a building at 2340 Frederick Douglass Boulevard.

== Description and history ==
The New York Amsterdam News was founded in 1909 by James H. Anderson at his home on West 165 Street. That year marked a shift in the African-American community away from the accommodationist policies of Booker T. Washington, and toward the a more activist attitude, exemplified in part by the founding of the National Association for the Advancement of Colored People. The News grew rapidly, and in 1916 moved into this building. Initially founded to serve the local Harlem community, it greatly expanded its reach, speaking out on national issues, and eventually reaching a nationwide audience. Because of this growth, it again outgrew these quarters, and moved to its present facilities in 1938.

The New York Amsterdam News Building is one of a series of four rowhouses located on the east side of Seventh Avenue (Adam Clayton Powell Boulevard), roughly midway between West 134th and West 135th Streets. It is four stories in height, built out of brownstone with Greek Revival styling, with a projecting cast iron cornice supported by modillions. The lower two levels house commercial spaces, with a staircase on the right side leading to the main building entrance. Windows and doors are set in openings framed by projecting bracketed surrounds with pilasters on the sides.

== See also ==
- List of National Historic Landmarks in New York City
- National Register of Historic Places listings in Manhattan above 110th Street
