= General Winfield Scott House =

Historic house in Manhattan, New York

- U.S. National Register of Historic Places
- U.S. National Historic Landmark
- New York State Register of Historic Places
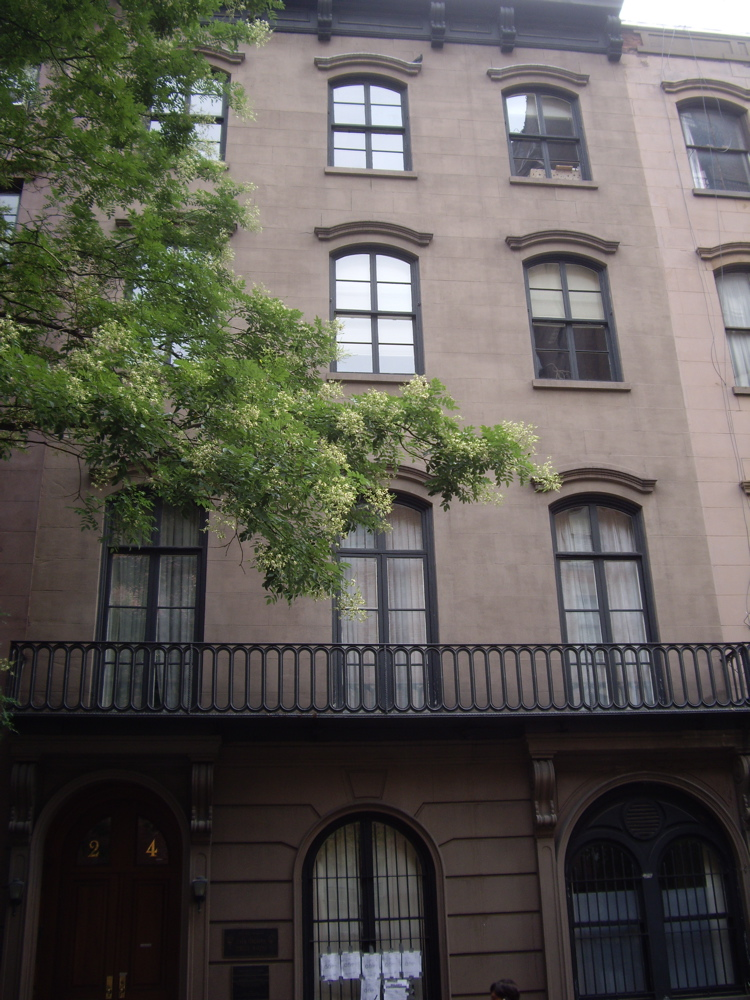

- Location within Manhattan Location within New York Location within the United States
- Location: 24 West 12th Street, Manhattan, New York City, New York
- Coordinates: 40°44′6″N 73°59′45″W
- Area: less than one acre
- Built: 1851
- Architectural style: Italianate
- NRHP reference No.: 73001222
- NYSRHP No.: 06101.001766

Significant dates
- Added to NRHP: November 7, 1973
- Designated NHL: November 7, 1973
- Designated NYSRHP: June 23, 1980

The General Winfield Scott House is a historic rowhouse at 24 West 12th Street in the Greenwich Village neighborhood of Lower Manhattan in New York City, New York, US. Built in 1851–52, the house was home to US Army general and unsuccessful Whig presidential candidate Winfield Scott (1786–1866) from 1853 to 1855. Best known as the leader of the United States Army during the Mexican–American War, Scott had a significant effect on the Army for about half a century. The building was declared a National Historic Landmark in 1973.

== Description and history ==
The General Winfield Scott House is located in Greenwich Village, on the south side of West 12th Street, roughly midway between Fifth and Sixth Avenues. It is one of a pair of virtually identical brownstones, four stories in height. The ground floor functions visually as a basement level, with a rusticated ashlar exterior topped by a projecting cornice and metal balustrade. The entrances and window bays on this level have keystoned rounded arches, with the entrances further articulated by paneled pilasters and scrolled brackets. Upper-level windows are set in segmental-arch openings, with eyebrow cornices.

The pair of houses was built in 1851–52 by Charles Partridge, a local businessman who lived next door. Number 24 was sold to Winfield Scott in 1853 and served as his home until 1855. Although Scott is best known as an unsuccessful presidential candidate in the 1852 election, and as a successful military leader in the 1846–48 Mexican–American War, he had a long and influential military career before these events. He was a successful drillmaster and leader in the War of 1812 and published a handbook on infantry tactics that was the first of its kind for the United States Army. He was also a successful negotiator, helping to defuse several crises in which military action was threatened, including the Nullification Crisis of 1832–33, and the Aroostook War of 1838–39.

== See also ==
- List of National Historic Landmarks in New York City
- National Register of Historic Places listings in Manhattan below 14th Street
