= Jackie Robinson House =

House in Brooklyn, New York

- John Roosevelt "Jackie" Robinson House
- U.S. National Register of Historic Places
- U.S. National Historic Landmark
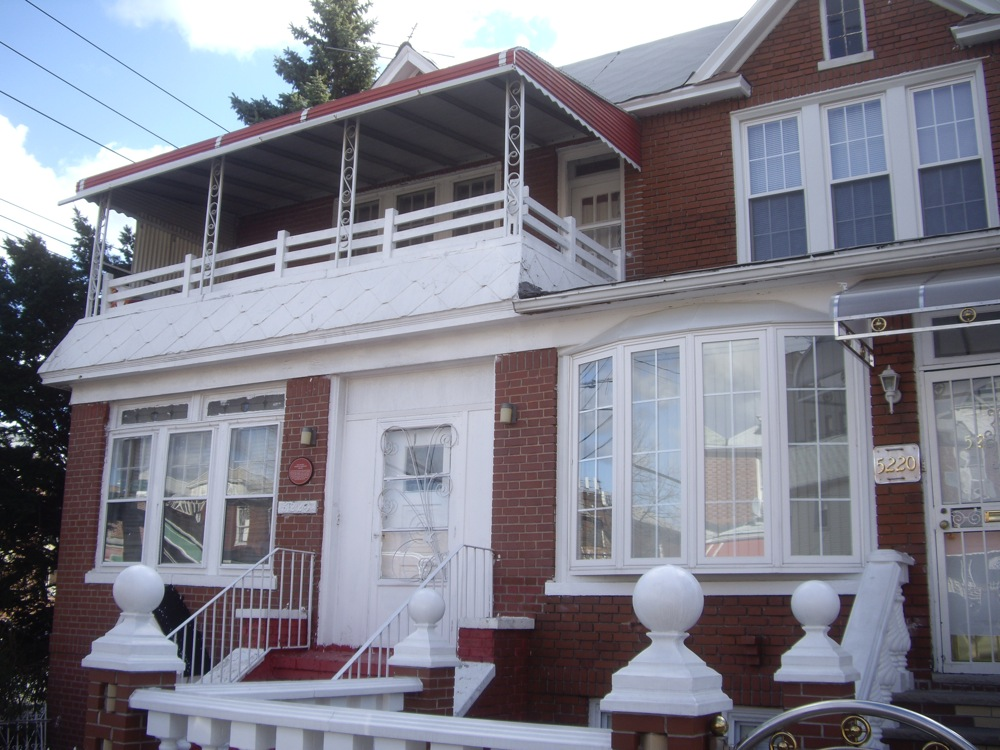

- Location within New York City Location within the United States
- Location: 5224 Tilden Ave., Brooklyn, New York
- Coordinates: 40.6481557°N 73.9272715°W
- Area: less than one acre
- Built: c. 1912-1916
- NRHP reference No.: 76001226

Significant dates
- Added to NRHP: May 11, 1976
- Designated NHL: May 11, 1976

The Jackie Robinson House is a historic house at 5224 Tilden Avenue in the New York City borough of Brooklyn. Built c. 1912-1916, it is prominent as the home of baseball great Jackie Robinson from 1947, when he was awarded Rookie of the Year, through 1949, when he was voted Most Valuable Player. It was declared a National Historic Landmark in 1976.

The Jackie Robinson House is located in Brooklyn's East Flatbush neighborhood, at the southwest corner of Tilden Avenue and East 53nd Street. It is a modest two-story brick duplex, with the units set side-by-side. Each is two bays wide, with the entrance set in the right-hand bay. 5224 is the left (east) unit, which has a band of three sash windows in the left bay, topped by a porch with a wooden railing and metal awning supported by decorative metal supports.

== History ==
The house was built sometime between 1912 and 1916. From 1947 to 1949 it was home to baseball player Jackie Robinson, the first African-American to play in the major leagues. Robinson had been signed to a contract in 1945 by Branch Rickey, owner of the Brooklyn Dodgers, and he was called up to the major league team after spending 1946 with minor league Montreal Royals. When he was called up, he and his wife Rachel had difficulty finding housing in Brooklyn due to racism; this was secured as a rental by a friend.

Another house, at 112-40 177th Street in the Addisleigh Park neighborhood of Queens, was the Robinsons' home from 1949 to 1955. "Locals had recently canceled a restrictive covenant that forbade blacks from living in the area, so African-American stars such as jazz great Count Basie and Herbert Mills of the Mills Brothers quartet moved in."

== See also ==
- List of National Historic Landmarks in New York City
- National Register of Historic Places in Kings County, New York
