= Admiral David Glasgow Farragut Gravesite =

- U.S. National Register of Historic Places
- U.S. National Historic Landmark
- U.S. National Historic Landmark District – Contributing property
- New York State Register of Historic Places
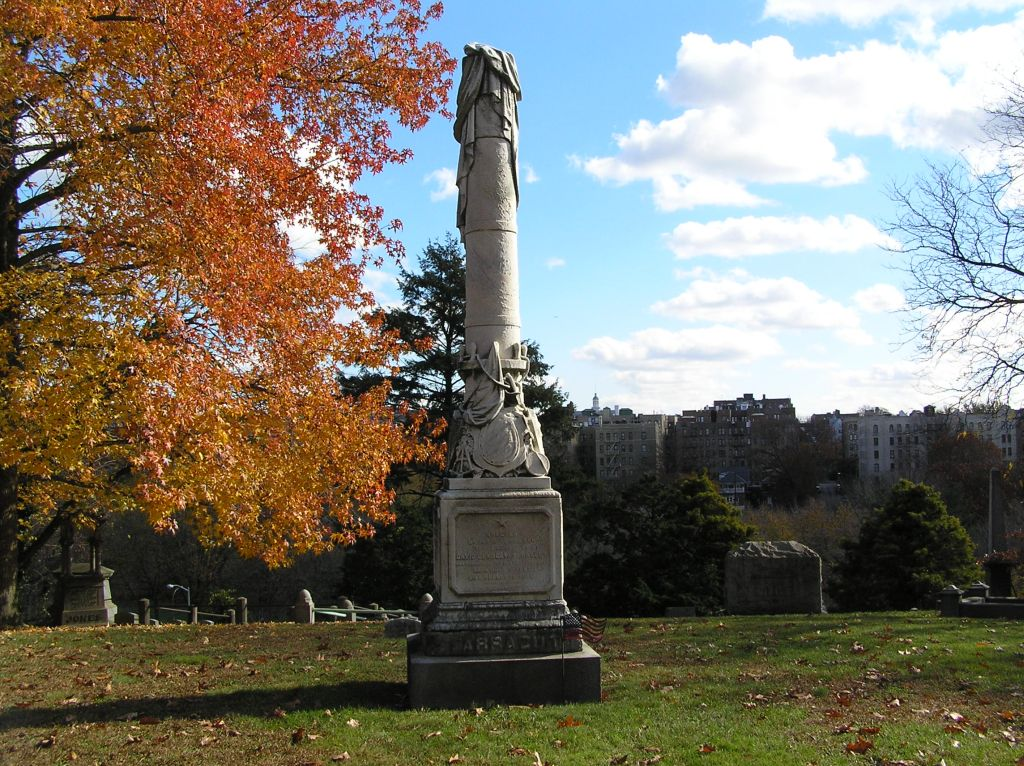

- Location within New York City Location within New York Location within the United States
- Location: Lot 1429-44, Section 14, Aurora Hill Plot, Woodlawn Cemetery, Bronx, New York
- Coordinates: 40°53′32″N 73°51′57″W
- Area: less than one acre
- Built: 1870
- Built by: Casoni & Isola
- Part of: Woodlawn Cemetery (ID11000563)
- NRHP reference No.: 12001008
- NYSRHP No.: 00501.001553

Significant dates
- Added to NRHP: October 16, 2012
- Designated NHL: October 16, 2012
- Designated NYSRHP: October 16, 2012

The Admiral David Glasgow Farragut Gravesite is the final resting place of David Glasgow Farragut (1801–1870), the first rear admiral, vice admiral, and four-star admiral of the United States Navy. He was best known for his order to "Damn the torpedoes, full speed ahead." The granite and marble monument resembling a mast marks not only his burial site, but that of his wife, son and daughter-in-law. It was listed as a National Historic Landmark on the National Register of Historic Places on October 16, 2012. It is located in Woodlawn Cemetery in the Bronx, itself a National Historic Landmark. It is the only surviving place of high quality with a direct association to Farragut's life.

== Description ==
The Farragut grave site is located in Woodlawn Cemetery's northeastern Aurora Hill section. It is set in a circular plot that is part of a larger lozenge-shaped section bounded on the east by East Boundary Drive, and the west by Daisy and Ravine Drives. The plot is ringed by a paved walkway, and the main monument is set on a local high point. From the ground level up, the monument consists of a granite foundation block, a marble pedestal, and a marble column. The column is intricately carved with depictions of events in Farragut's life, and is designed to resemble a part of a wooden ship mast. The top of the column consists of a carved representation of a draped American flag. At the base of the column are carved representations of naval-themed objects, as well as representations of Farragut's Civil War flagship the USS Hartford, and Forts Jackson and Philips, whose guns he famously ran past during the Capture of New Orleans. The pedestal is basically square, with carved words describing Farragut's deeds. The memorial was carved by the firm of Casoni & Isola, based on New York but owning marble quarries in Italy.

== See also ==
- List of National Historic Landmarks in New York City
