= Woodlawn Cemetery (Bronx) =

Cemetery in New York City

- U.S. National Register of Historic Places
- U.S. National Historic Landmark District
- New York State Register of Historic Places
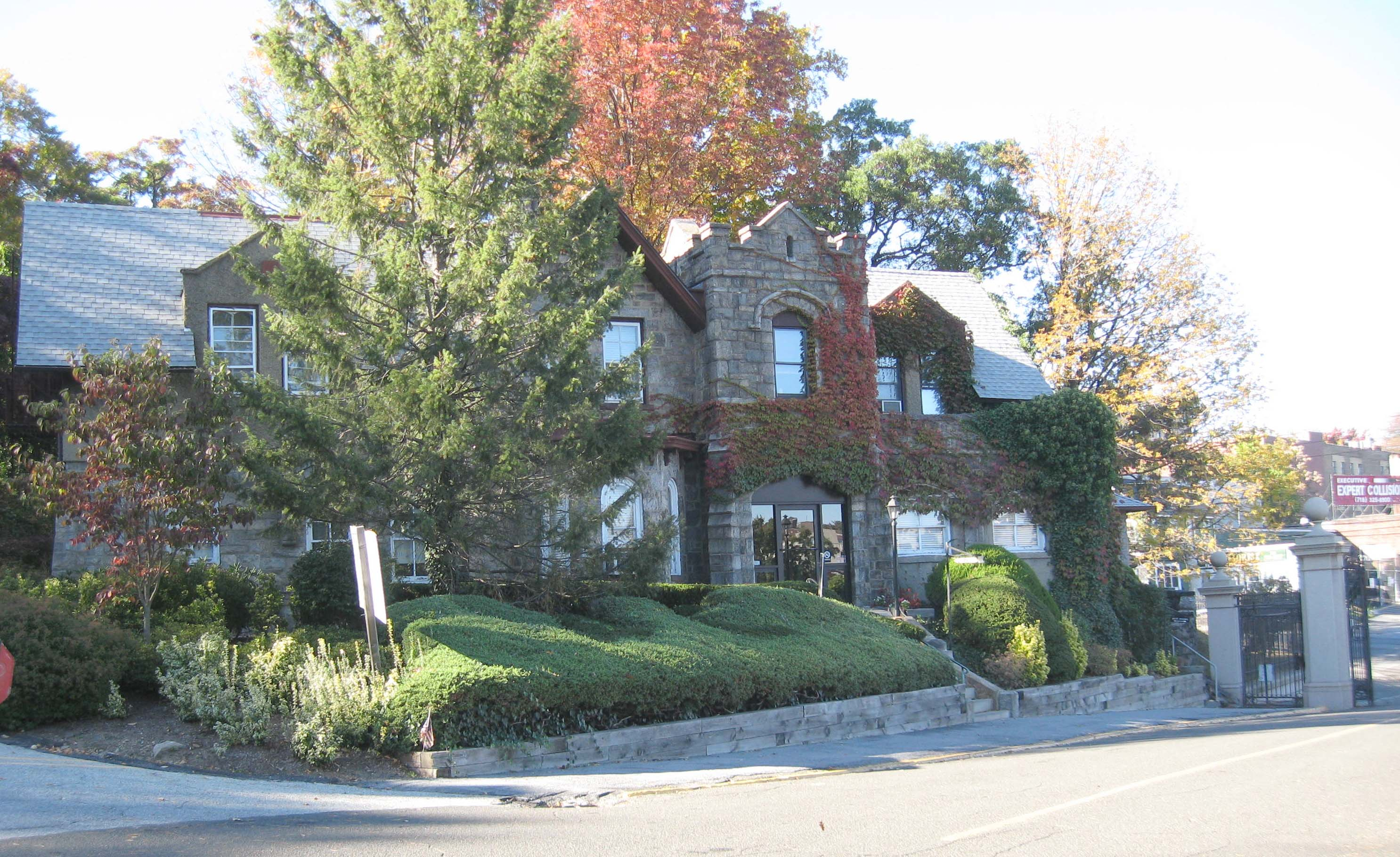
- Main office building

- Location within New York City Location within New York Location within the United States
- Location: Webster Avenue and East 233rd Street; Woodlawn, Bronx
- Coordinates: 40°53′21″N 73°52′24″W
- Website: thewoodlawncemetery.org
- NRHP reference No.: 11000563
- NYSRHP No.: 00501.001264

Significant dates
- Added to NRHP: June 23, 2011
- Designated NHLD: June 23, 2011
- Designated NYSRHP: June 23, 2011

Woodlawn Cemetery is one of the largest cemeteries in New York City and a designated National Historic Landmark. Located south of Woodlawn Heights, Bronx, it has the character of a rural cemetery. It is notable in part as the final resting place of some well-known figures.

Woodlawn Cemetery opened during the Civil War in 1863, in what was then an undeveloped part of Yonkers, Westchester County, that was annexed to New York City in 1874. A stone-mounted plaque marks the site of a Revolutionary War-era redoubt constructed by the Continental Army in 1776 to protect its retreat from Manhattan to Westchester. It is located on a high point in the southeastern section of the cemetery, near Gun Hill Road.

== Locale and grounds ==
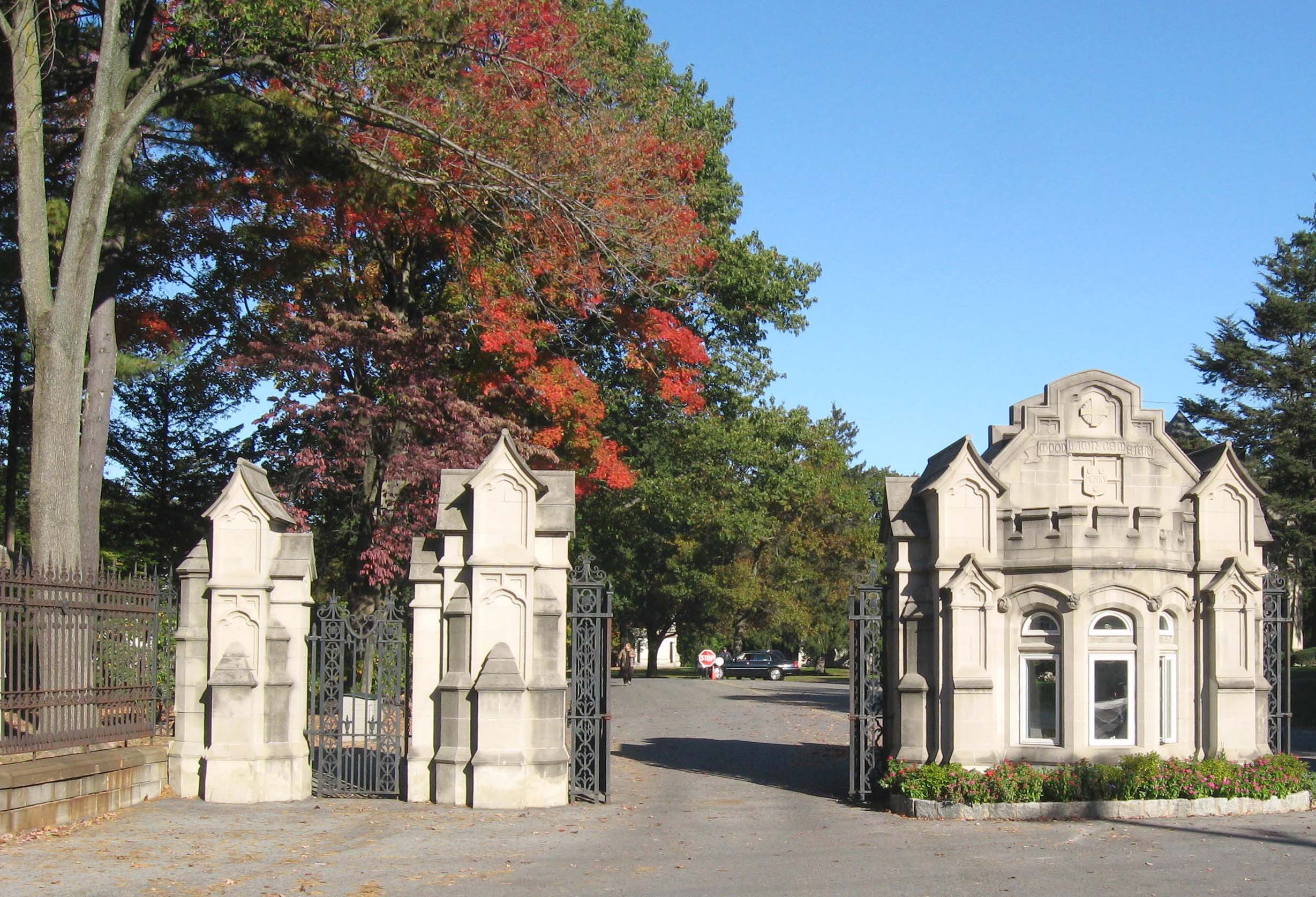
Jerome Avenue gate

The Cemetery covers more than 400 acres (160 ha) and is the resting place for more than 300,000 people. Built on rolling hills, its tree-lined roads lead to many unique memorials, some designed by famous architects: McKim, Mead & White, John Russell Pope, James Gamble Rogers, Cass Gilbert, Carrère and Hastings, Sir Edwin Lutyens, Beatrix Jones Farrand, and John La Farge. The cemetery contains seven Commonwealth war graves – six British and Canadian servicemen of World War I and an airman of the Royal Canadian Air Force of World War II. In 2011, Woodlawn Cemetery was designated a National Historic Landmark (NHL), since it shows the transition from the rural cemetery popular at the time of its establishment to the more orderly 20th-century cemetery style. In 2012, the Admiral David Glasgow Farragut Gravesite at Woodlawn Cemetery was itself designated a NHL (one of a few that is part of another NHL).

As of 2007, plot prices at Woodlawn were reported as $200 per square foot, $4,800 for a gravesite for two, and up to $1.5 million for land to build a family mausoleum.

== Burials moved to Woodlawn ==
Woodlawn was the destination for many human remains disinterred from cemeteries in more densely populated parts of New York City:

- Rutgers Street church graves were moved to Woodlawn. Most graves were re-interred with a stated date of December 20, 1866 into the Rutgers Plot, lots 147–170.
- West Farms Dutch Reformed Church, at Boone Avenue and 172nd Street in The Bronx, had most of its graves moved to Woodlawn Cemetery in 1867 and interred in the Rutgers Plot, Lots 214–221.
- Bensonia Cemetery, also known as "Morrisania Cemetery", was originally a Native American burial ground. The graves were moved to Woodlawn Cemetery with a stated date of April 21, 1871 and re-interred into Lot 3. Public School #138, in The Bronx, is now on the site.
- Harlem Church Yard cemetery internees were moved to Woodlawn. Most graves were re-interred with a stated date of August 1, 1871 into the Sycamore Plot, lots 1061–1080.
- Nagle Cemetery remains were moved in November–December 1926 and reinterred in Primrose Plot, Lot 16150. Identities of those interred are apparently unknown.
- The Dyckman-Nagle Burying Ground, West 212th Street at 9th Avenue, in the Borough of Manhattan, was originally established in 1677 and originally contained 417 plots. In 1905, the remains, with the exception of Staats Morris Dyckman and his family, were removed. By 1927, the Dyckman graves were finally moved to Woodlawn Cemetery. The former Dutch colonial-era cemetery is now the New York City Subway's 207th Street Yard.

The fictional cemetery of the Synagogue in Brooklyn in the film Once Upon a Time in America is actually located here, renamed "Riverdale Cemetery".

== Notable burials ==
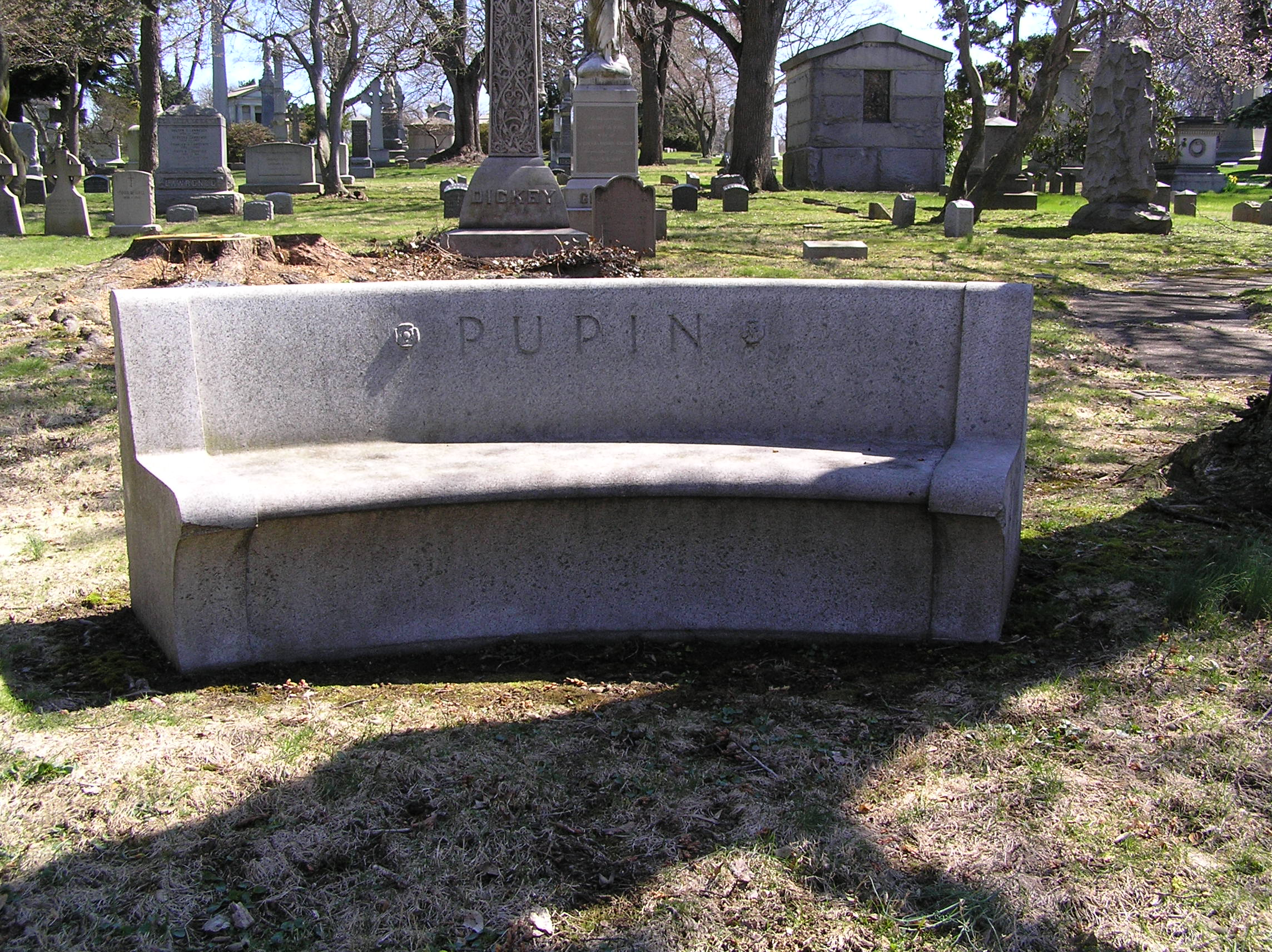
Pupin's burial site in Woodlawn Cemetery

Numerous notable persons have been interred at Woodlawn Cemetery including: Chief Justice of the United States Charles Evans Hughes; influential New York urban planner and builder Robert Moses; former Congressman Vito Marcantonio; actress Cicely Tyson; actor Harry Carey; actress Edgena De Lespine, Olympic champion swimmer Gertrude Ederle; aviation pioneer Harriet Quimby; performer, playwright and producer George M. Cohan; gangster Bumpy Johnson; authors Nellie Bly, Countee Cullen, Clarence Day, Damon Runyon, E.L. Doctorow, Herman Melville, and Dorothy Parker; musicians Irving Berlin, Miles Davis, Duke Ellington, Ace Frehley, W. C. Handy, Fritz Kreisler, Pigmeat Markham, King Oliver, Felix Pappalardi, and Max Roach; singers Celia Cruz and Florence Mills; Film director Otto Preminger; husband and wife magicians Alexander Herrmann and Adelaide Herrmann; sportswriter Grantland Rice; gunfighter and US marshal Bat Masterson; developer of the Rolfing body therapy and noted female biochemist Ida Rolf; Serbian-American electrical engineer, physicist, inventor, professor at Columbia University Mihajlo Pupin; and businessmen such as shipping magnate Archibald Gracie, cosmetics manufacturer Richard Hudnut, America's first self-made millionaire woman Madam C. J. Walker, department store founder Rowland Hussey Macy, and variety store mogul F. W. Woolworth. A large number of New York brewers (e.g., the Haffens of Haffen Brewing Company) are interred there on "Brewer's Row", along with a dozen other brewing scions and their families.

== Conservancy ==
The Woodlawn Conservancy is a 501(c)(3) nonprofit organization associated with Woodlawn Cemetery. It began as the Friends of Woodlawn in 1999. It enhances the mission of Woodlawn through fundraising, educational opportunities and outreach with other non-profits. In 2021, over 40 stones were conserved in a joint effort between the Woodlawn Conservancy, the Friends of the Rye African-American Cemetery, World Monuments Fund, and the Jay Heritage Center. The preservation effort was launched to coincide with the new federal Juneteenth celebration.

=== Great Trees of New York City ===
In 1985, five trees were selected as Great Trees of New York City by the New York City Department of Parks and Recreation: a European Cutleaf Beech, White Pine, White Oak, Weeping beech, and Umbrella Pine. In 2024, three additional trees were selected: Littleleaf Linden, Japanese Maple, and Black Oak.

== Gallery ==
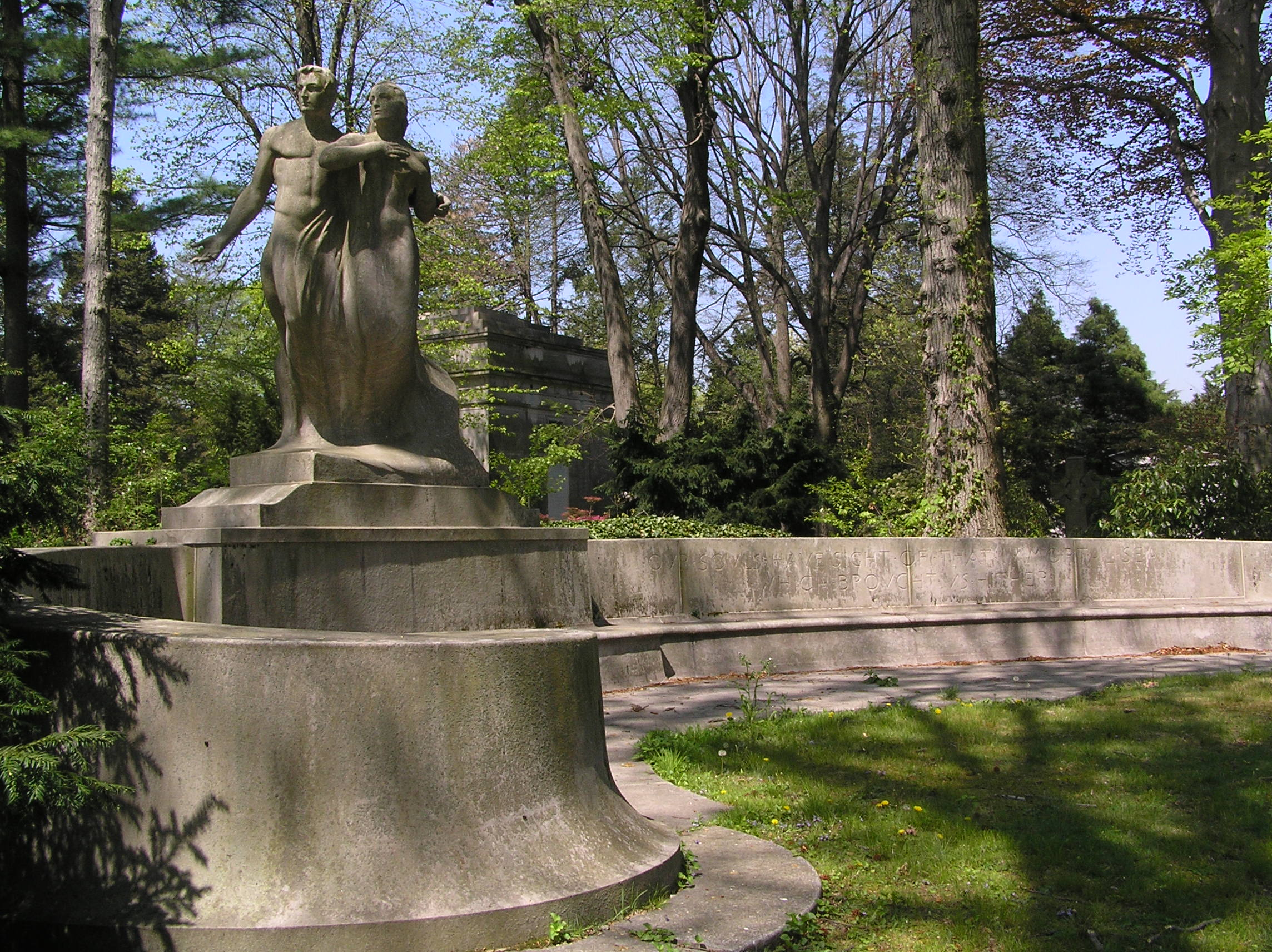
Annie Bliss Titanic memorial

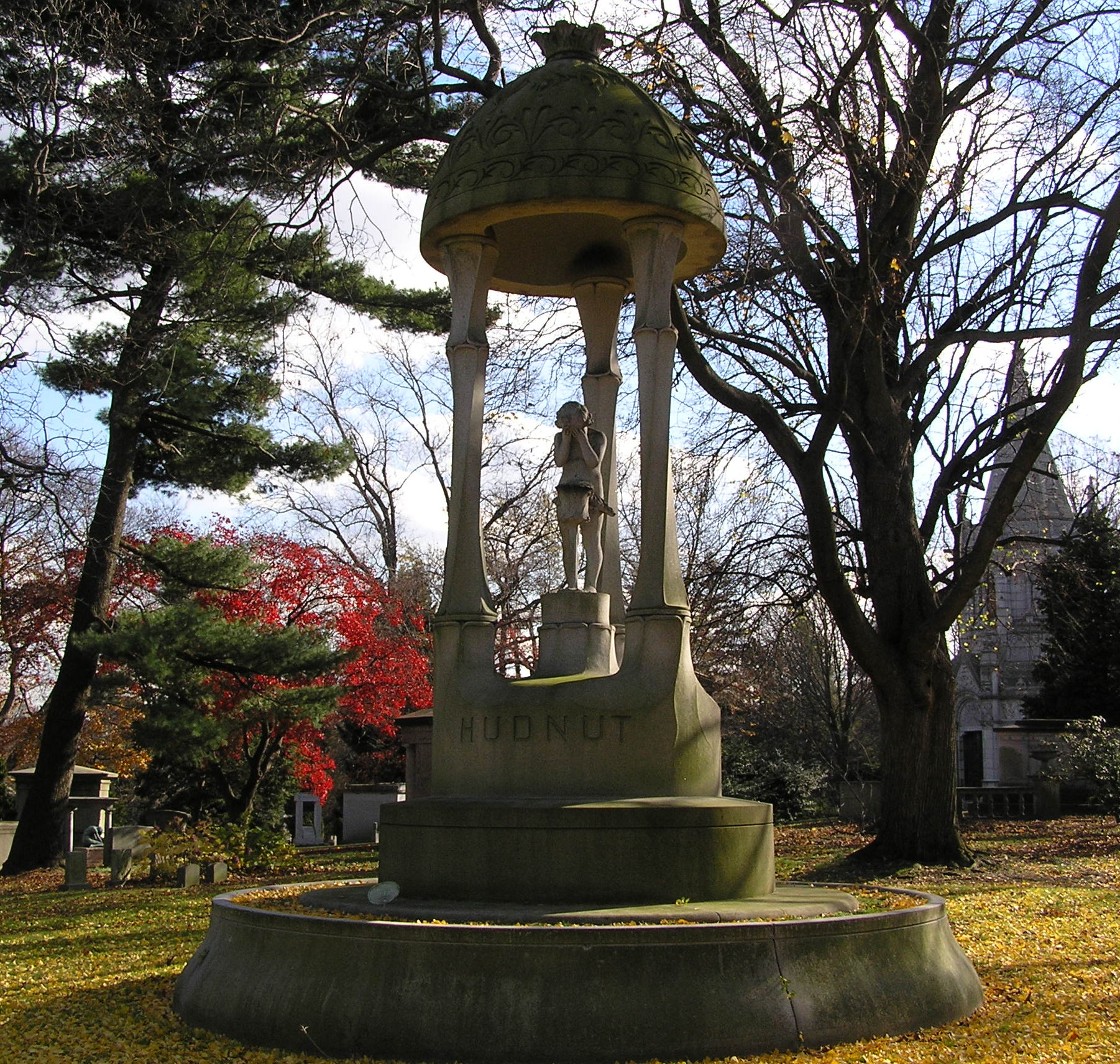
Richard Hudnut Monument

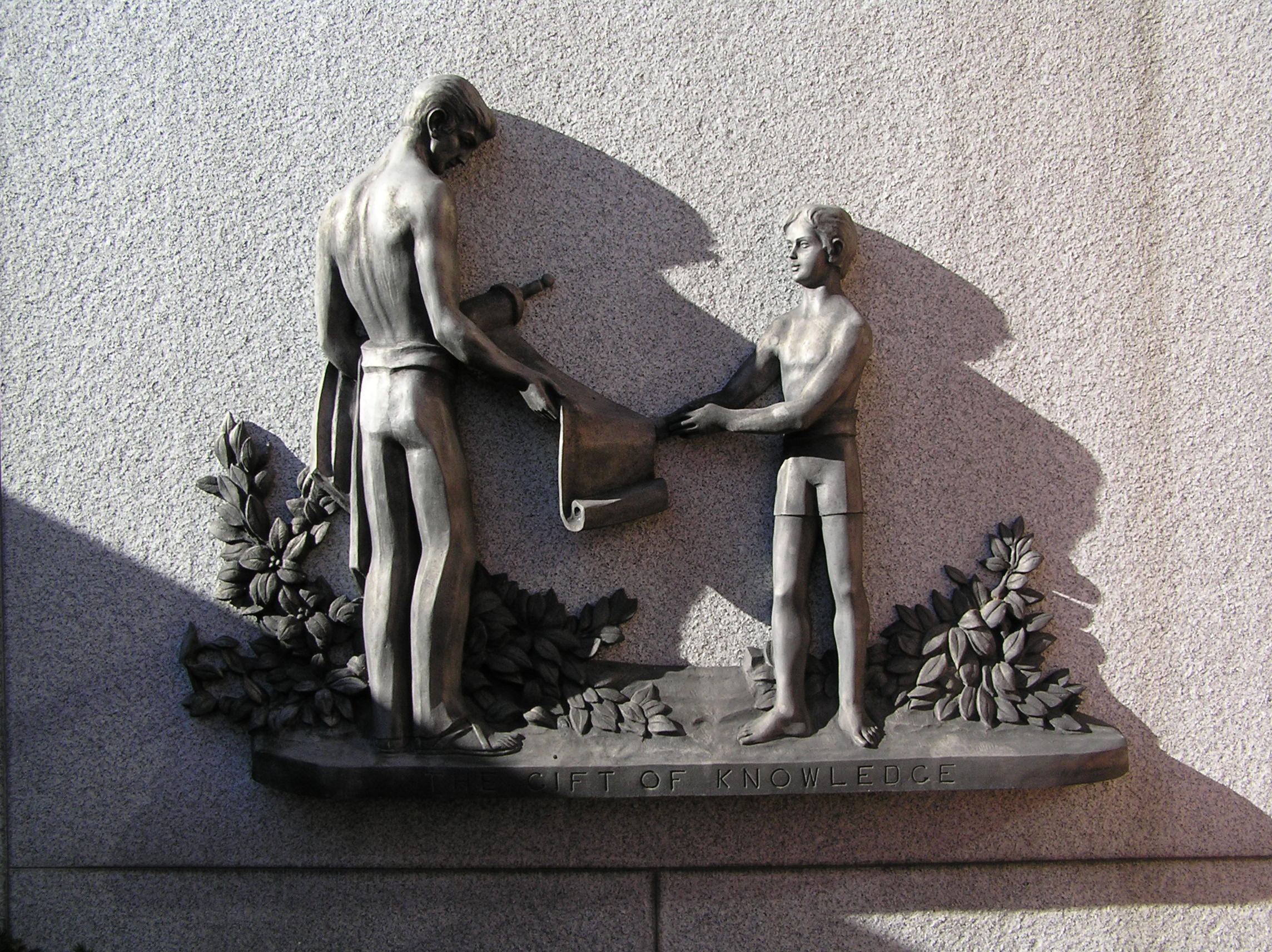
The Gift of Knowledge, by B. Zuckermann, sculpture in Van Cortlandt Mausoleum

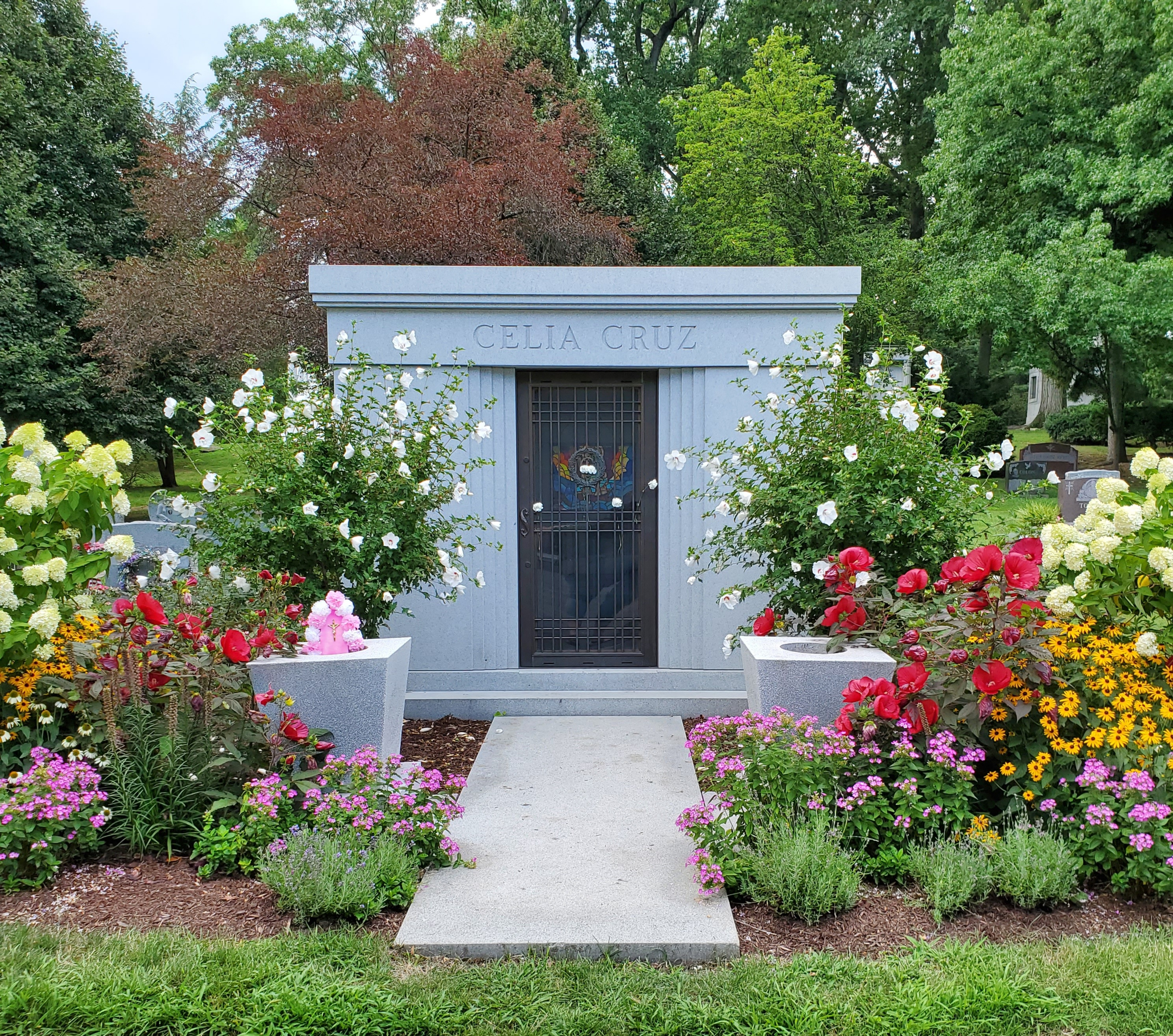
Celia Cruz's mausoleum

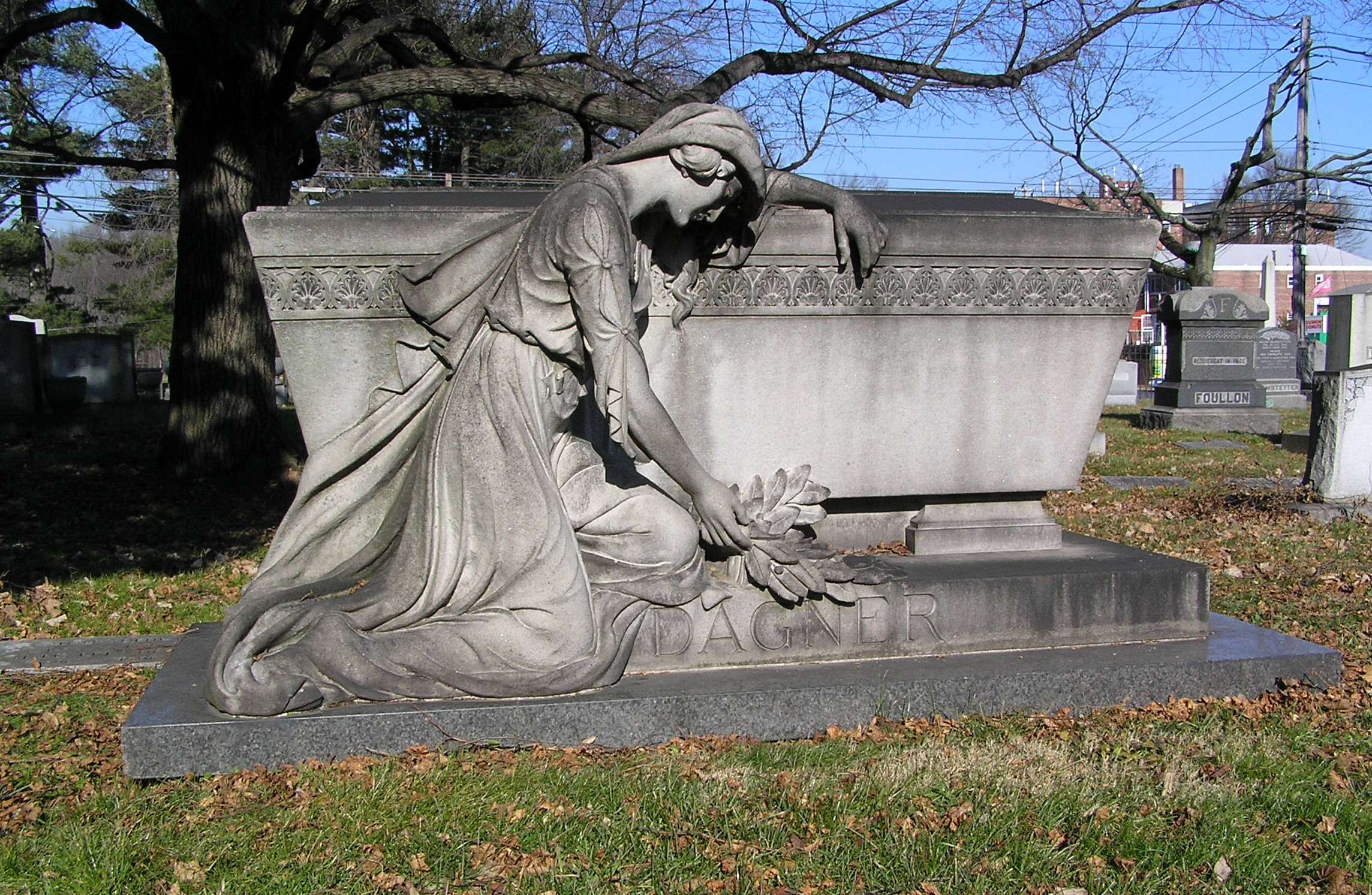
Sarcophagus with angel

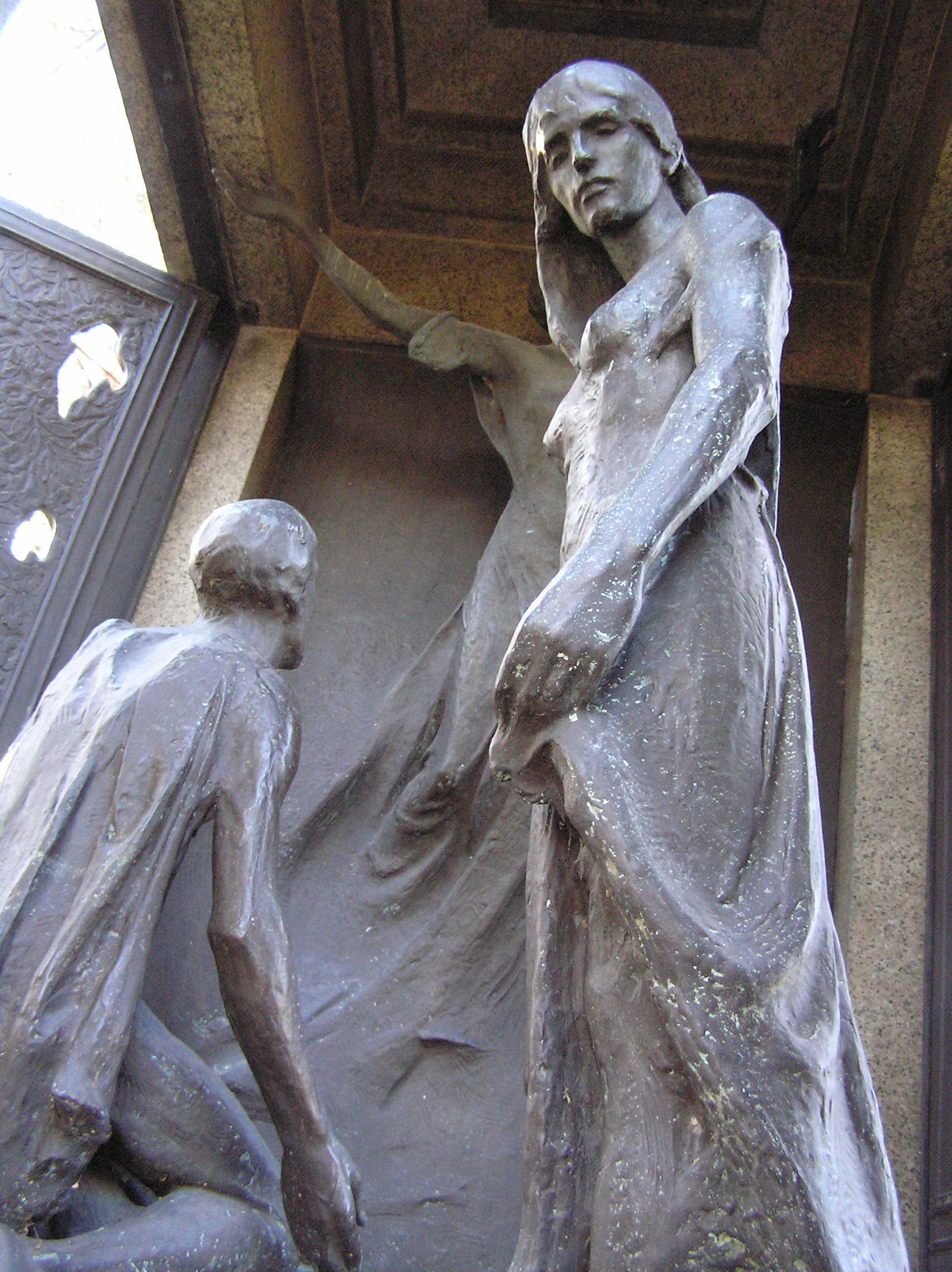
Déshabillé statue

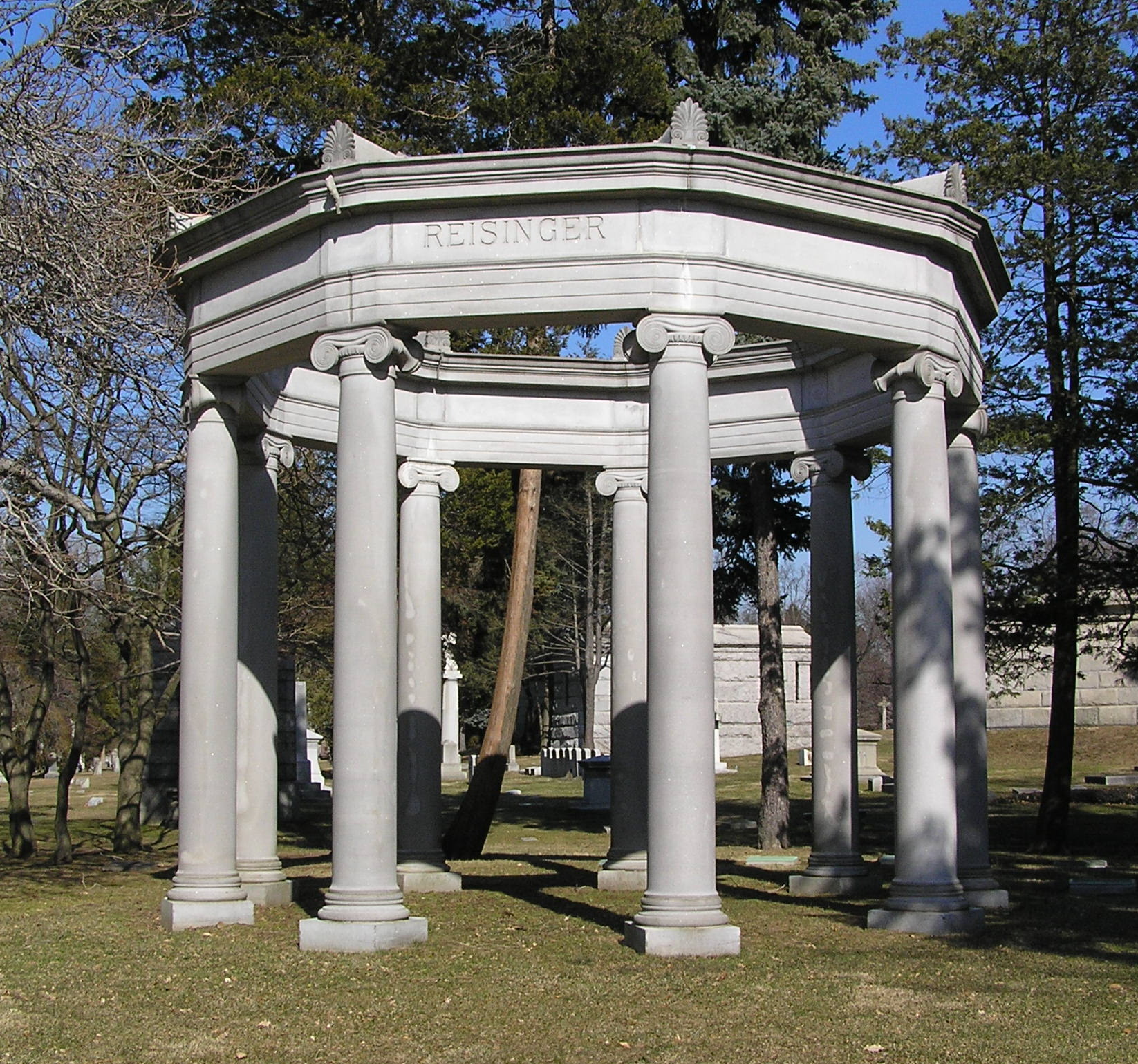
Reisinger Monument

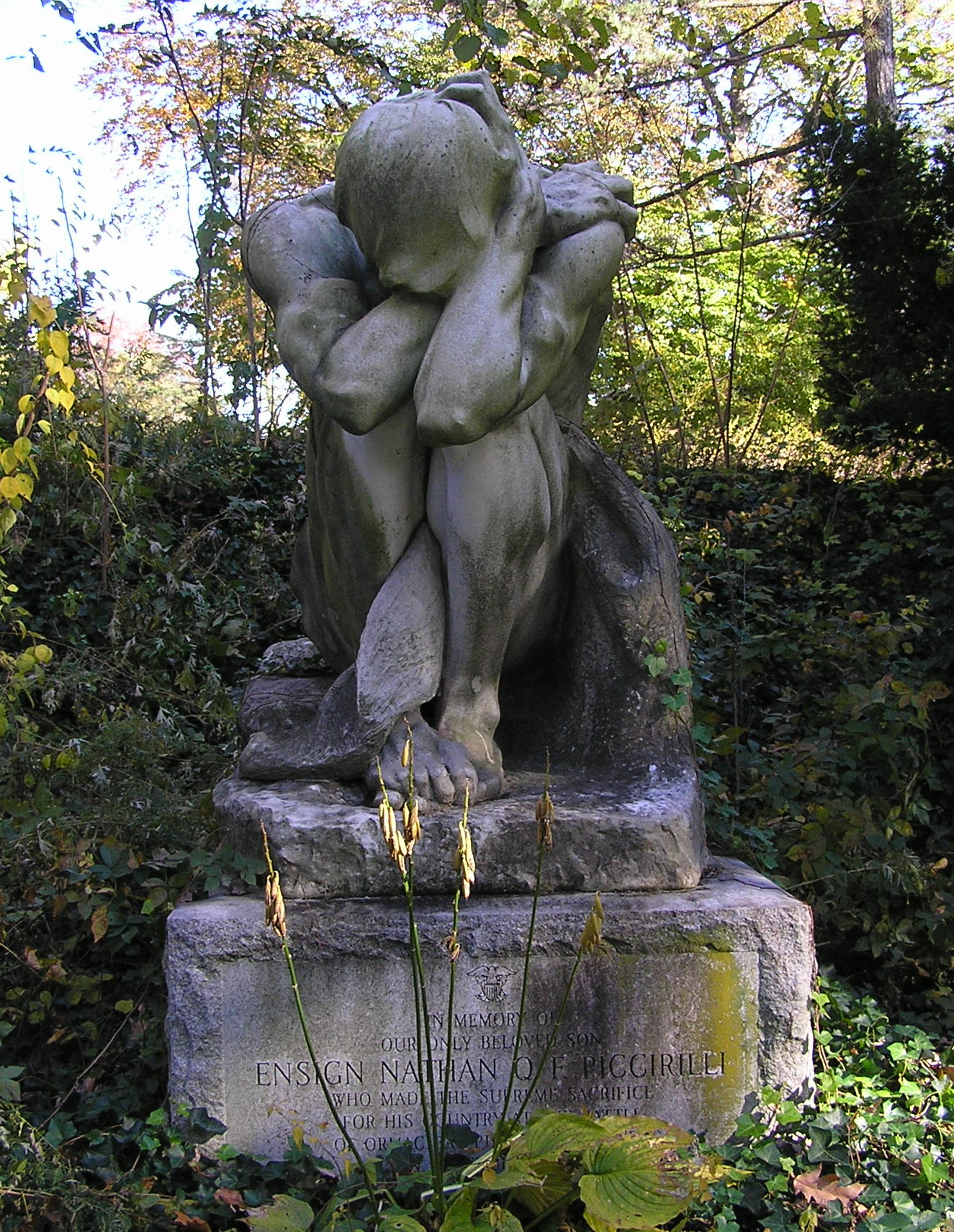
Nathan Piccirilli Monument

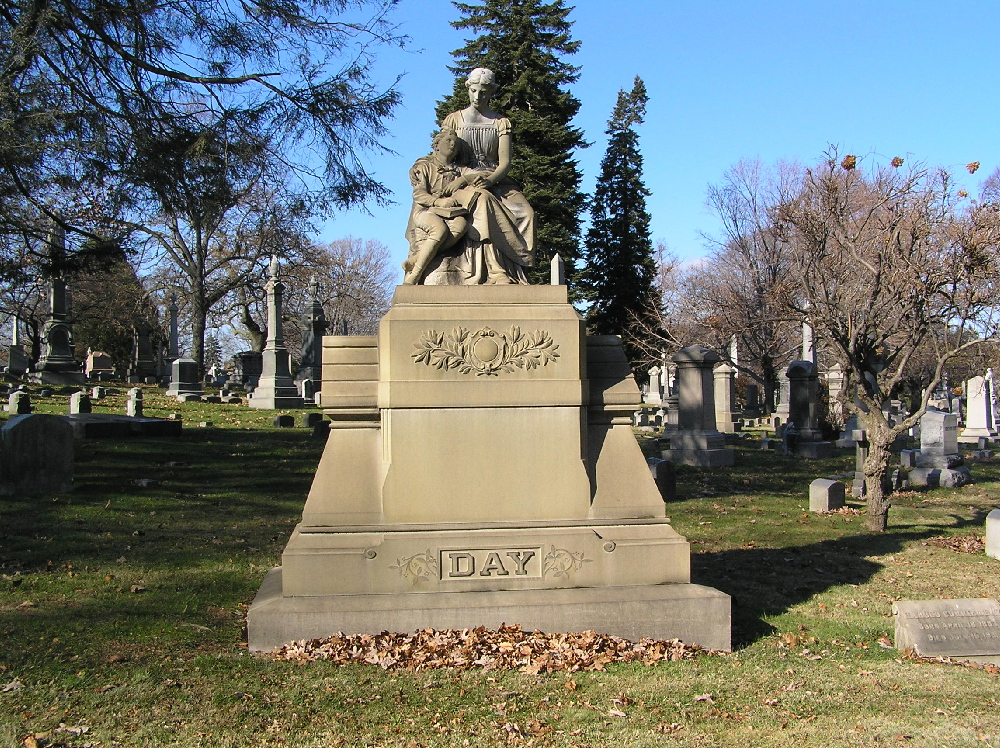
The monument of Clarence Day

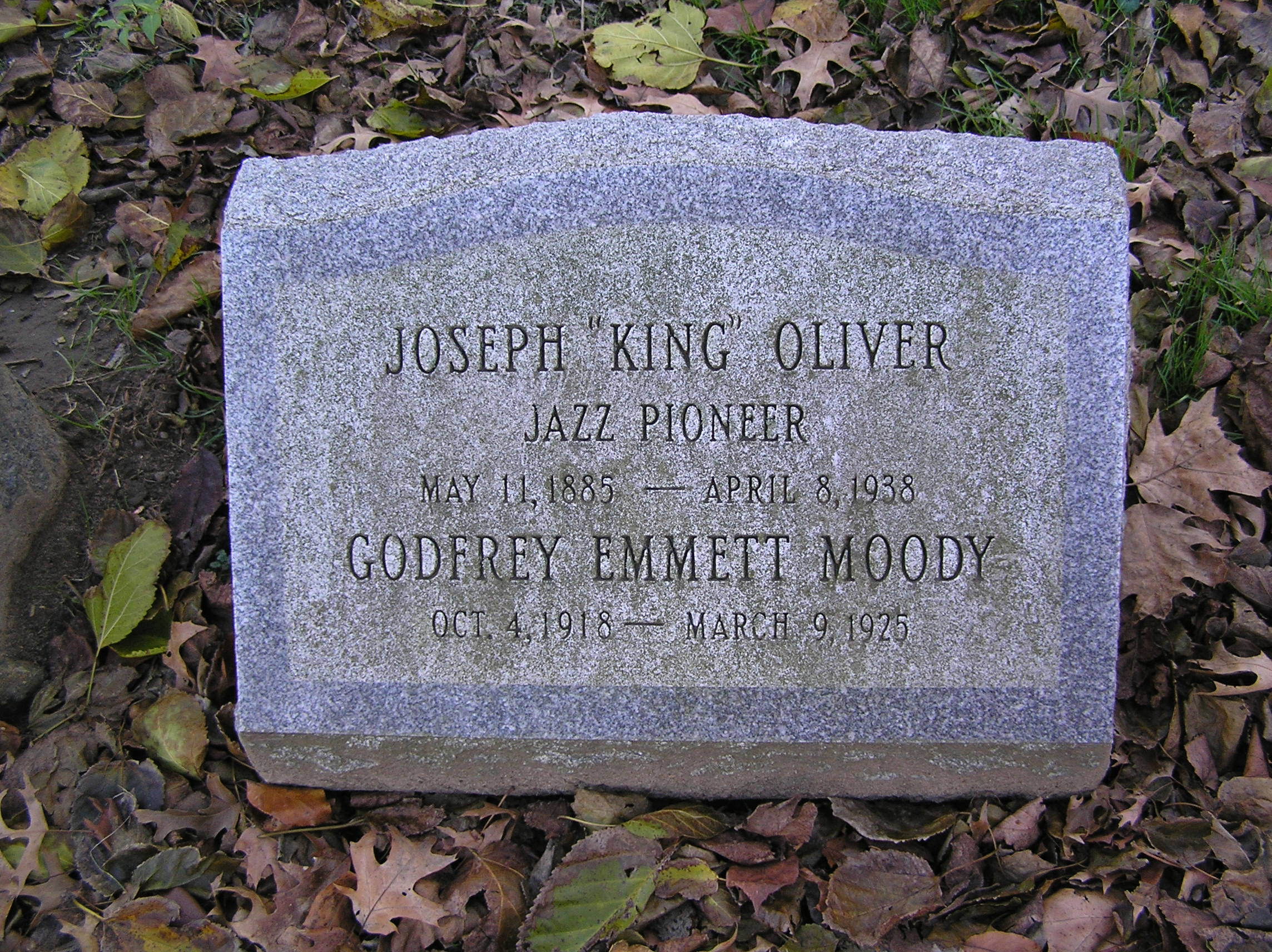
Joe "King" Oliver's grave

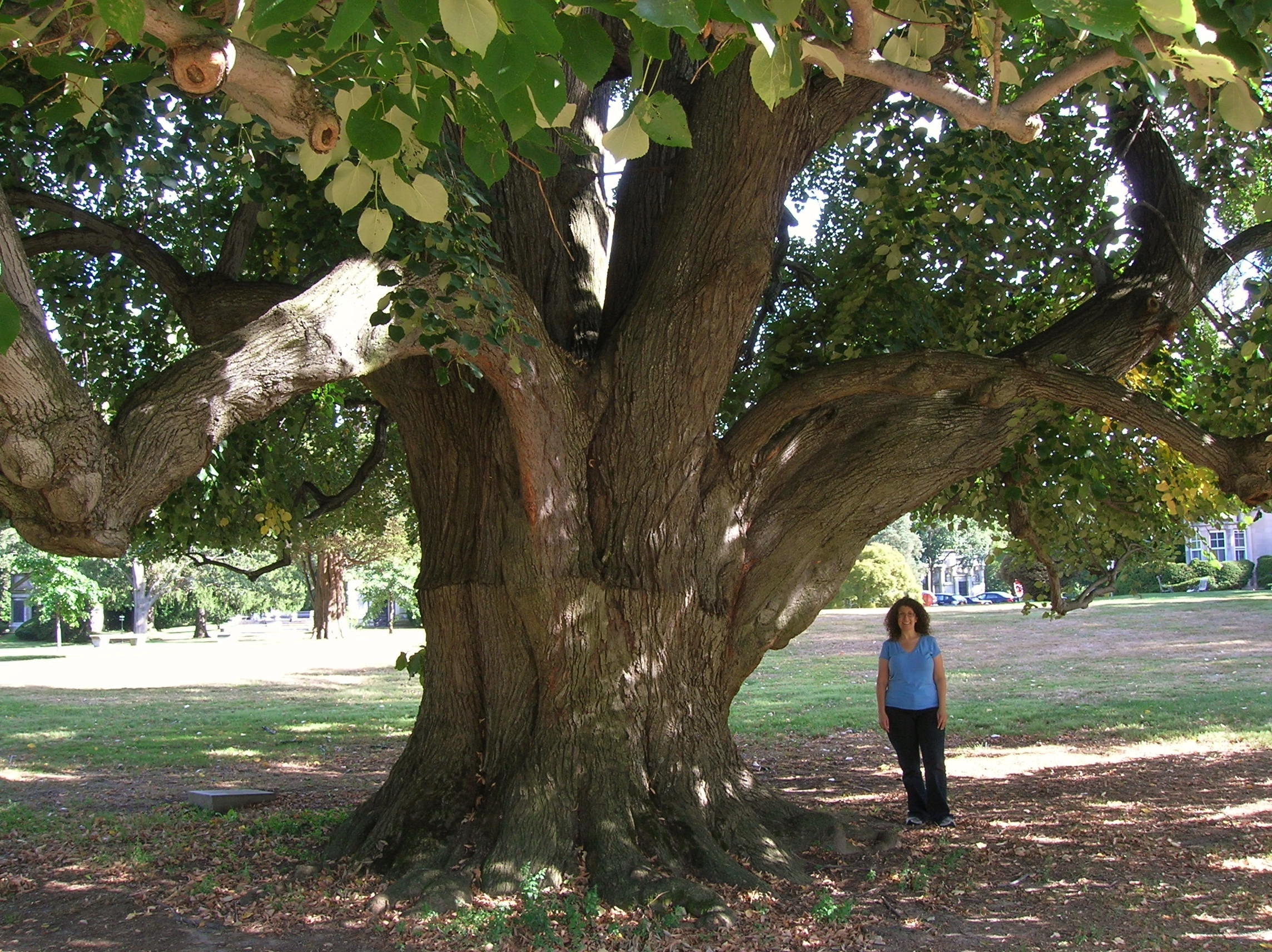
Linden Tree

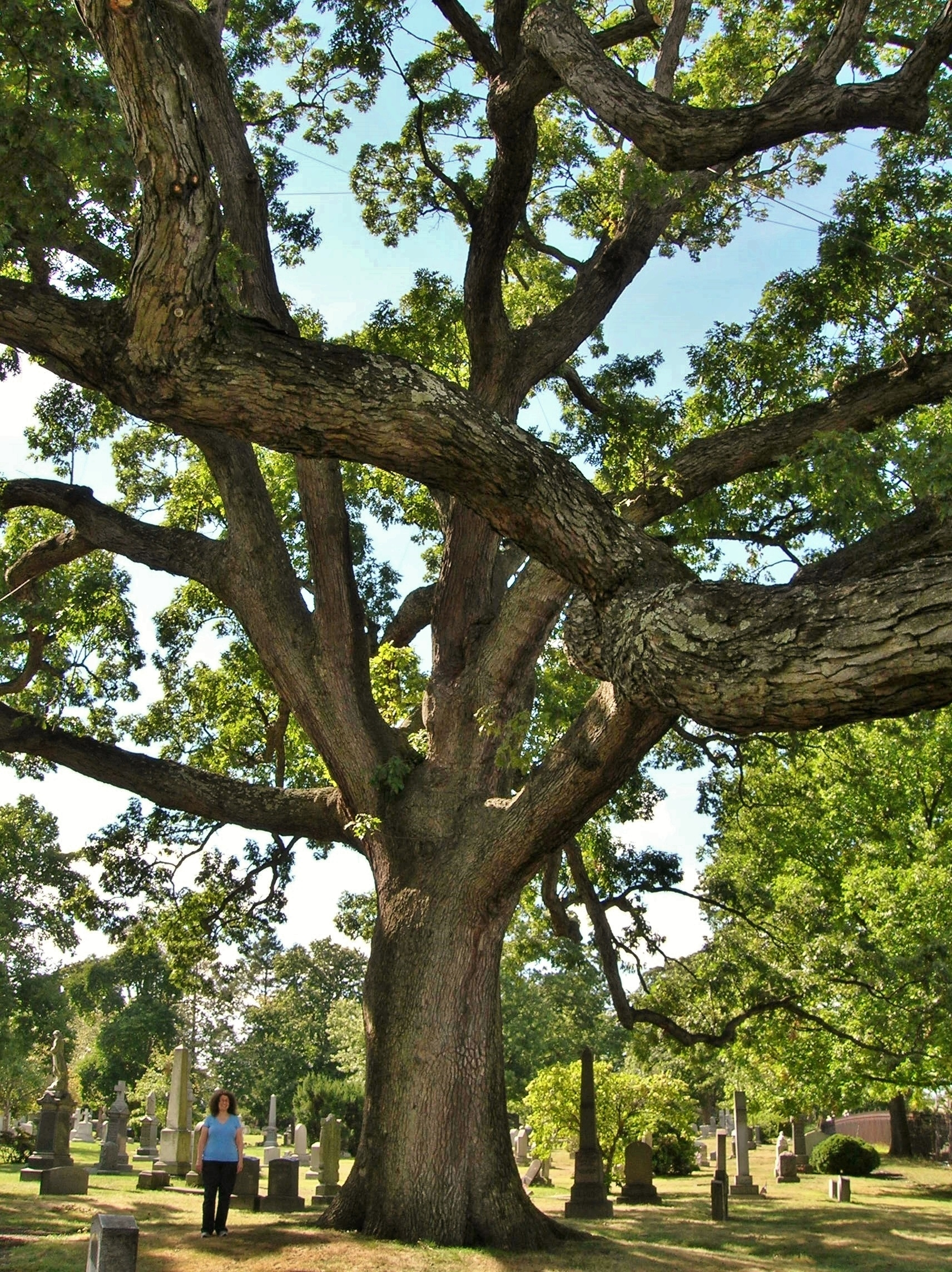
White Oak Tree

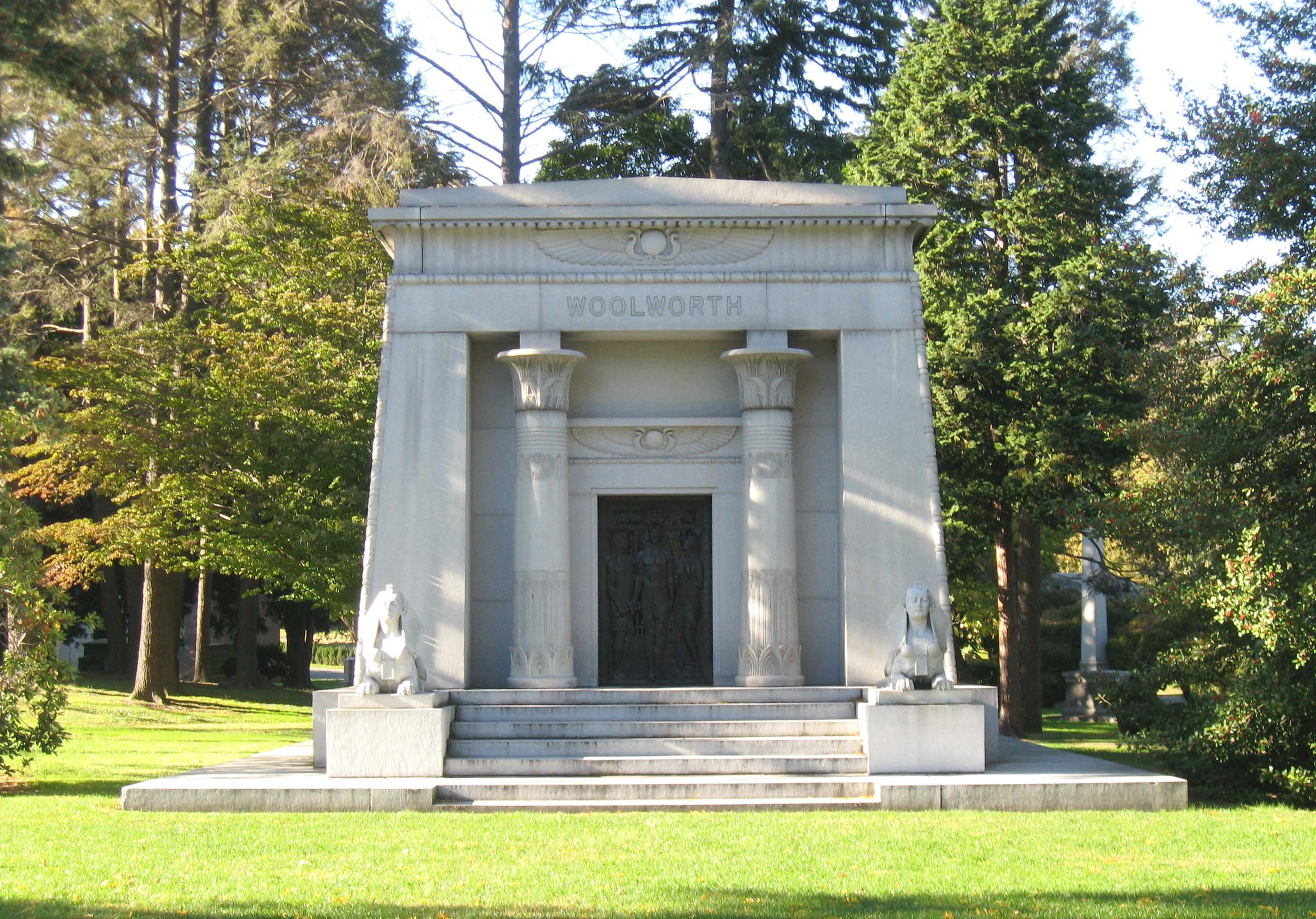
Woolworth's tomb

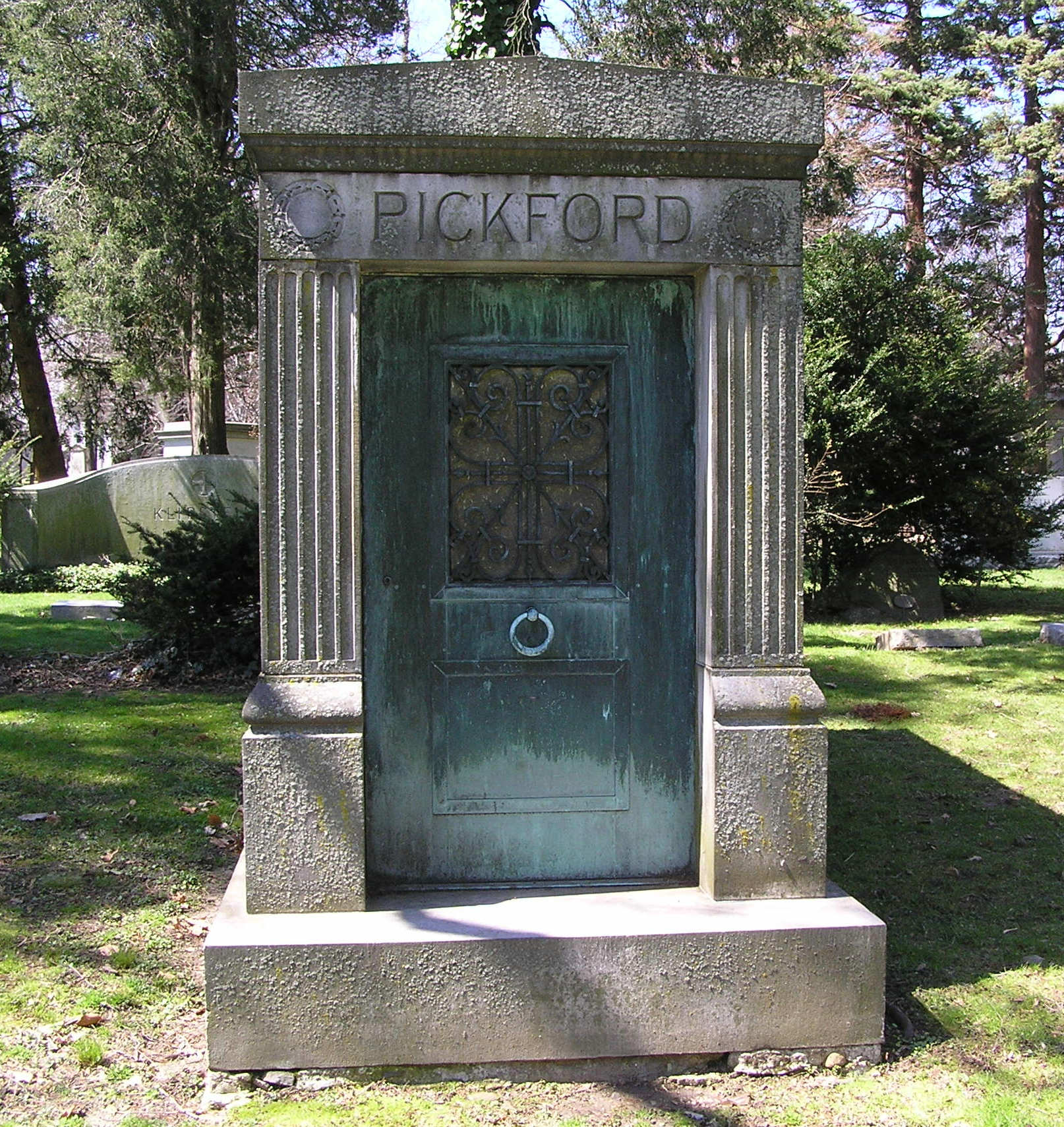
Olive Thomas's mausoleum

== See also ==
- List of burial places of justices of the Supreme Court of the United States
- List of cemeteries in New York
- List of cemeteries in the United States
- List of mausolea
- List of National Historic Landmarks in New York City
- List of New York City Landmarks
- National Register of Historic Places listings in the Bronx
- Rural Cemetery Act

Other National Historic Landmark cemeteries:

- Green-Wood Cemetery, Brooklyn
- Laurel Hill Cemetery, Philadelphia, Pennsylvania
- Mount Auburn Cemetery, Cambridge, Massachusetts
