= National Register of Historic Places listings in Manhattan =

Location of New York County in New York

There are 596 properties and districts listed on the National Register of Historic Places in New York County, New York, which consists of Manhattan Island, the Marble Hill neighborhood on the mainland north of the Harlem River Ship Canal, and adjacent smaller islands around it. One listing (Riverside Park), appears on more than one of the lists described below.

This National Park Service list is complete through NPS recent listings posted November 6, 2026.

Contents: Counties in New York
Albany (Albany) – Allegany – Bronx – Broome – Cattaraugus – Cayuga – Chautauqua – Chemung – Chenango – Clinton – Columbia – Cortland – Delaware – Dutchess (Poughkeepsie, Rhinebeck) – Erie (Buffalo) – Essex – Franklin – Fulton – Genesee – Greene – Hamilton – Herkimer – Jefferson – Kings – Lewis – Livingston – Madison – Monroe (Rochester) – Montgomery – Nassau – New York (Below 14th Street, 14th to 59th Streets, 59th to 110th Streets, Above 110th Street, Islands) – Niagara (Niagara Falls) – Oneida – Onondaga (Syracuse) – Ontario – Orange – Orleans – Oswego – Otsego – Putnam – Queens – Rensselaer – Richmond – Rockland – St. Lawrence – Saratoga – Schenectady – Schoharie – Schuyler – Seneca – Steuben – Suffolk – Sullivan – Tioga – Tompkins – Ulster – Warren – Washington – Wayne – Westchester (Northern, Southern, New Rochelle, Peekskill, Yonkers) – Wyoming – Yates

== Lists by area ==
National Register of Historic Places listings, by area, in Manhattan...

Area	Image	First Date listed	Last Date listed	No. of Listings
Below 14th Street		October 15, 1966	May 10, 2024	188
From 14th to 59th Streets		October 15, 1966	August 4, 2025	164
From 59th to 110th Streets		October 15, 1966	April 29, 2025	117
Above 110th Street		October 15, 1966	November 3, 2025	113
Adjacent Islands		October 15, 1966	September 14, 2017	15

== See also ==
New York City

- National Register of Historic Places listings in Kings County, New York (Brooklyn)
- National Register of Historic Places listings in Queens County, New York
- National Register of Historic Places listings in Richmond County, New York (Staten Island)
- National Register of Historic Places listings in Bronx County, New York
- List of New York City Designated Landmarks in Manhattan

New York State

- National Register of Historic Places listings in New York
- List of National Historic Landmarks in New York
