= Lewis Miller (philanthropist) =

American industrialist (1829–1899)

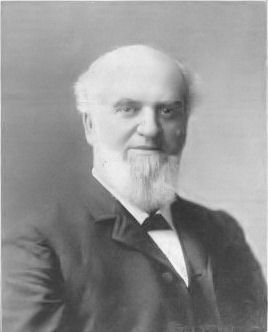
- Born: December 13, 1829; Greentown, Ohio, US
- Died: February 17, 1899 (aged 69); New York City, US
- Occupations: Inventor and industrialist
- Employer(s): C. Aultman & Co. Aultman, Miller & Co. Buckeye Mower & Reaper Co.
- Known for: Inventor of Buckeye Mower (1855), Akron Plan architecture for Sunday school buildings (1867), co-founder of the Chautauqua Assembly (1874), philanthropy
- Title: Partner, Superintendent, and President (c. 1892)
- Political party: Greenback candidate for Congress (1878)
- Spouse: Mary Valinda Alexander (m. 1852)
- Relatives: Mina Miller Edison (daughter); Thomas Edison (son-in-law); Emily Huntington Miller (sister-in-law); Charles Edison (grandson); Theodore Miller Edison (grandson)

Lewis Miller (July 24, 1829 – February 17, 1899) was an American businessman and philanthropist who made a fortune in the late 19th century as inventor of the first combine (harvester-reaper machine) with the blade mounted efficiently in front of the driver, to the side of the horse(s), rather than pulled behind. His daughter Mina (1865–1947) married fellow Ohio inventor Thomas Alva Edison on February 24, 1886.

== Biography ==
Miller was born in Greentown, Ohio. He devoted much of his wealth to public service and to charitable causes associated with the Methodist Episcopal Church, and was the inventor of the "Akron Plan" for Sunday schools, a building layout with a central assembly hall surrounded by small classrooms, a configuration Miller conceived with Methodist minister John Heyl Vincent and architect Jacob Snyder. The arrangement accommodated 1) a collective opening exercise for all the children; 2) small radiating classrooms for graded instruction in the uniform lesson of the day; and 3) a general closing exercise in the central assembly area.

John Heyl Vincent collaborating was baptist layman B.F. Jacobs devised a system to encourage Sunday school work, and a committee was established to provide the International Uniform Lesson Curriculum, also known as the "Uniform Lesson Plan". By the 1800s, 80% of all new members were introduced to the church through Sunday school.

In 1874, interested in improving the training of Sunday school teachers for the Uniform Lesson Plan, Miller and Vincent worked together again to found what is now the Chautauqua Institution on the shores of Chautauqua Lake, New York.

Miller died in 1899 of kidney disease and was buried in Glendale Cemetery in Akron, Ohio. The Lewis Miller Cottage, his residence at Chautauqua, is a National Historic Landmark and considered one of the first prefabricated structures in the United States.
