= John Humble (artist) =

American photographer (1944–2025)

- Humble in 2015
- Born: 1944; Washington, D.C., U.S.
- Died: April 13, 2025 (aged 80–81); Los Angeles, California, U.S.
- Education: University of Maryland; San Francisco Art Institute (MFA)
- Occupation: Photographer
- Website: johnhumble.com

John Kenneth Humble (1944 – April 13, 2025) was an American photographer known for his large-format color photographs of the cityscape and infrastructure of Los Angeles. His gallerist Craig Krull described his focus as "the oddities, absurdities, and mundane beauty of LA."

His work is in the collections of the J. Paul Getty Museum, the Los Angeles County Museum of Art, the San Francisco Museum of Modern Art, and other institutions.

== Early life and education ==
Humble was born in 1944 in Washington, D.C. to a military family. He started high school in Panama and graduated in Highland Park, Illinois.

Humble attended the University of Maryland before being drafted and serving 13 months in Vietnam as a medic beginning in 1967. He bought his first camera in Vietnam and learned to develop film there. After returning, he photographed for the University of Maryland student newspaper, then worked as a photojournalist at The Washington Post. He also contributed to Newsweek, Time, and U.S. News & World Report.

In 1973, Humble received his Master of Fine Arts from the San Francisco Art Institute. He traveled through Europe, the Middle East, Africa, and Asia, photographing from a Volkswagen van, before settling in Los Angeles in 1974.

== Career ==
=== Photography ===
Humble initially used a 35mm camera and black-and-white film. After color photography gained recognition in fine art through exhibitions like William Eggleston's 1976 show at the Museum of Modern Art, Humble switched to color. In 1979, he bought a 4×5 large-format view camera and began making Cibachrome prints, later moving to chromogenic color prints. In 1979, Humble was one of eight photographers selected for the Los Angeles Documentary Project, a photographic survey of the city organized by Alan Jutzi and funded by a National Endowment for the Arts grant to document Los Angeles on the occasion of its 1981 bicentennial. (Note: The other photographers were Gusmano Cesaretti, Joe Deal, Robbert Flick, Douglas Hill, Bill Owens, Susan Ressler, and Max Yavno.)

In the late 1990s, Humble photographed the ocean from a single point on the beach over the course of a year, producing the series Lifeguard Station 26. Humble also began photographing the Los Angeles River's span from Canoga Park to Long Beach, which became the series Fifty-One Miles of Concrete. In 2006, Humble began photographing industrial areas near the Port of Los Angeles on Sunday afternoons, which became the series Sunday Afternoon. In 2013 and 2014, he photographed Pico Boulevard, a series covering the street's 16 miles from Santa Monica to downtown Los Angeles, through Jewish, Russian, Korean, and Latino neighborhoods.

Humble was represented by Craig Krull Gallery in Santa Monica for over two decades.

=== Teaching ===
Humble was a part-time instructor at colleges and universities across Southern California for twenty years before teaching full-time at Fullerton College until retiring in 2006.

== Work ==
Humble has been described as capturing "the quirky side of L.A." He did not frame his work in political terms, though he acknowledged "a huge disparity in Los Angeles" and noted that "so many of the areas in which I photograph are areas where there are the have-nots."

5021 Felton Avenue, Hawthorne, August 17, 1991. A house sits before freeway ramps under construction near LAX.

Humble's subjects included industrial infrastructure, such as freeways and the Port of Los Angeles, as well as residential neighborhoods and small commercial strips along the city's main corridors. His compositions often placed these smaller buildings against the surrounding infrastructure of the city, with freeways, refineries, and power lines looming over them.

Many of Humble's photographs depicted graffiti on concrete walls, barred windows, and an overhead grid of power lines. He also photographed commercial signage: fluorescent paint on storefront windows, hand-painted murals on market walls, and posted street-level signs.

Humble built a reinforced platform on the roof of his van to serve as a camera position, giving him an elevated vantage point for composing street scenes. Humble preferred to shoot on clear days in the late afternoon, when harsh light flattened the scene and cast strong shadows.

== Critical reception ==
Though Humble's work has been compared to the New Topographics movement and Ed Ruscha's documentation of Los Angeles, Humble photographed the city in saturated color rather than the black-and-white associated with those earlier approaches. A 2006 Afterimage survey of Southern California photography described Humble's Los Angeles River photographs as celebrating "urban design, color, and light," and grouped him with John Divola, Robbert Flick, Sant Khalsa, and Catherine Opie as photographers who engaged with the region without being regionalists.

Humble's photographs concentrated on specific parts of Los Angeles. A 2007 Artweek review of his Getty exhibition wrote that Humble documented the "socially and politically invisible areas of industrial and working-class Los Angeles." A Journal of the West review of A Place in the Sun noted that his photographs were "selective rather than a sampling" of the city, depicting older neighborhoods and working-class areas while omitting suburban Los Angeles entirely.

Critics often addressed the tensions in Humble's photographs. David Pagel of the Los Angeles Times wrote in 1994 that Humble's photographs traded in neither L.A.'s "inhuman artificiality" nor its "sunshine, stardom and seduction," but in "a deep ambivalence about the city." In 2000, Frieze observed that "what makes Humble's pictures intriguing isn't the way they create a sense of place about [Los Angeles], but how they capture its sense of dislocation". A 2002 Artweek review of his Los Angeles River series noted that Humble allowed his photographs to sustain contradictory readings.

== Selected exhibitions ==
- 1981: Year 200: New Views of Los Angeles, Mount St. Mary's College, Los Angeles and Grossmont College, El Cajon
- 1994: Jan Kesner Gallery, Los Angeles
- 2001: The Los Angeles River: 51 Miles of Concrete, Jan Kesner Gallery, Los Angeles
- 2006: L.A. River Reborn, Skirball Cultural Center, Los Angeles
- 2007: A Place in the Sun: Photographs of Los Angeles by John Humble, J. Paul Getty Museum, Los Angeles
- 2008: This Side of Paradise: Body and Landscape in L.A. Photographs, Huntington Library, San Marino (traveled to Musée de l'Elysée, Lausanne, 2009; Musée Nicéphore Niépce, Chalon-sur-Saône, 2009–2010)
- 2010: Amerika Haus, Munich
- 2010: Stieglitz19, Antwerp
- 2014: Pico Boulevard, Craig Krull Gallery, Bergamot Station
- 2019: Los Angeles Cibachromes, Joseph Bellows Gallery, La Jolla
- 2024: Latest and Greatest: New Work at Laguna Art Museum, Laguna Art Museum, Laguna Beach

== Collections ==
Humble's work is in the permanent collections of several institutions, including:

- Amon Carter Museum of American Art
- Center for Creative Photography
- J. Paul Getty Museum
- Laguna Art Museum
- Los Angeles County Museum of Art
- Museum of Contemporary Art, Los Angeles
- Museum of Photographic Arts
- National Gallery of Art
- San Francisco Museum of Modern Art
- Smithsonian American Art Museum

== Publications ==
- A Place in the Sun: Photographs of Los Angeles. Essay by Gordon Baldwin. Los Angeles: J. Paul Getty Museum, 2007. ISBN 978-0-89236-881-5.
- Manifest Destiny. Portland, OR: Nazraeli Press, 2016. ISBN 978-1-59005-453-6.
- Pico Boulevard. Portland, OR: Nazraeli Press, 2021. ISBN 978-1-59005-549-6.

== Personal life ==
Humble died in Los Angeles on April 13, 2025, from cardiovascular complications.
