= Lee Shippey =

American journalist (1884–1969)

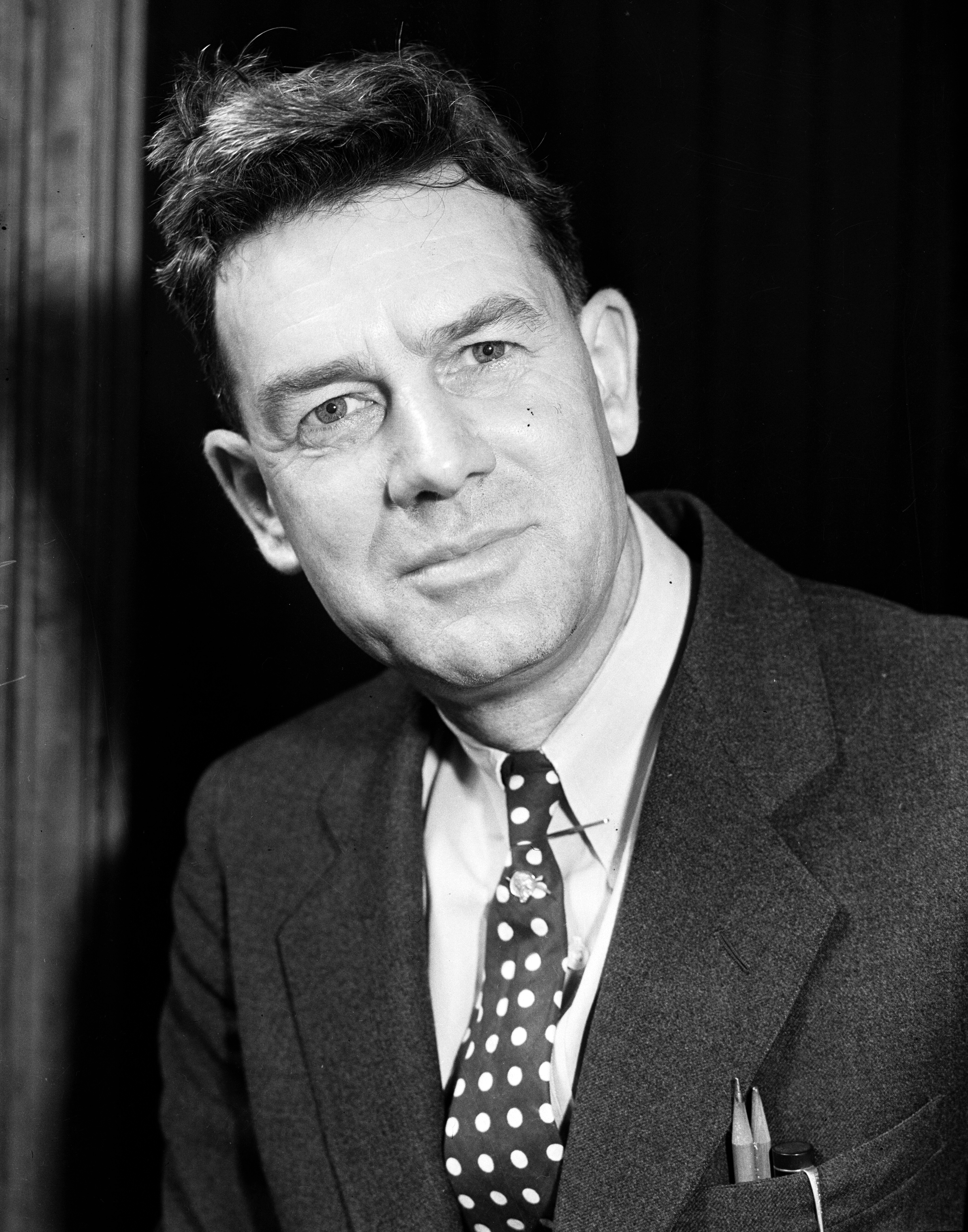
Shippey in the 1930s

Henry Lee Shippey (February 26, 1884 – December 30, 1969), who wrote under the name Lee Shippey, was an American author and journalist whose romance with a French woman during World War I caused a sensation in the United States as a "famous war triangle." Shippey later wrote a popular column in the Los Angeles Times for 22 years.

== Biography ==
=== Early life ===
Shippey was born February 26, 1884, in Memphis, Tennessee, the son of William Francis Shippey and Elizabeth Kerr Freligh of Missouri. His siblings were Louisia, Virginia Lee Davis and Mrs. Charles Stewart. The elder Shippey had been in the Confederate Navy and was treasurer of the Kansas City & Northwestern Railway. After the death of his father on July 24, 1899, Lee left Central High School to begin his working life as a laborer in a meat packing-house, then started his career in journalism as a night-shift copyholder — somebody who reads written material aloud to a proofreader — on the Kansas City Times, going to high school during the day. He was twenty years old when he graduated, and two colleges offered "inducements" to attend as a football player, "but I could not afford to accept them." Instead, he took a part-time job as football coach at Westport High School.

As a young man, he was poisoned by the wood alcohol he had been using over a period of weeks to clean a meerschaum pipe, resulting in the loss of most of his sight. "As he lay helpless in bed, thinking life held nothing in the future for him, he was astounded to hear his sister reading some of his own humorous writings which he had surreptitiously left on the desk of the associate editor of the Kansas City Star." The editor offered him a job, at first paying the young man from his own salary, and he dictated his first humor columns for the Star from his bed.

Shippey was married to another writer, Mary Blake Woodson, on August 20, 1908, in Jackson County, Missouri. They lived together while he was editor-owner of the Higginsville Jeffersonian in Higginsville, Missouri, which he bought for three hundred dollars after the death of owner Jules Coe. Shippey then became known as the "poet-philosopher of Higginsville." Lee and Mary's only child, Henry Lee Shippey Jr., was born on May 20, 1910. After the outbreak of World War I, Shippey sold the newspaper and returned to the Star. In 1917 he was president of the Missouri Writers' Guild.

=== The famous 'war triangle' ===
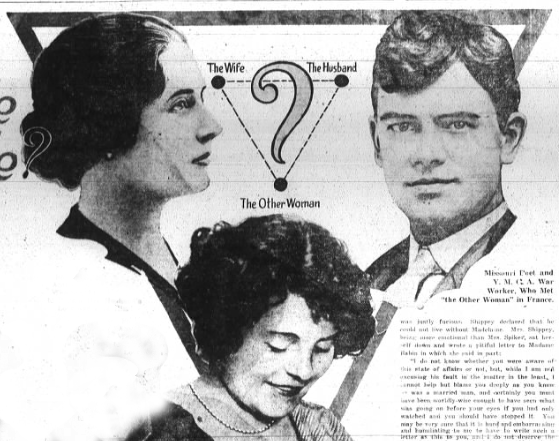
Lee Shippey, with his first wife, Mary Blake Woodson, left, and his second wife, Madeleine Babin, bottom. This layout appeared in several U.S. newspapers in December 1921

==== Romance ====
During World War I, Shippey was working for the YMCA in Paris, France. At the same time, he was writing for various American newspapers as a correspondent. Shippey told two versions of how he became acquainted with Madeleine Babin, the French woman for whom he eventually left his wife.

===== The 1920 version =====
On November 1, 1918, the 34-year-old Shippey met the 20-year-old Madeleine, who, with her family, was placing flowers on the graves in the American cemetery in Suresnes, France. At this point, the Babins — a mother and two daughters — had lost the father of the family, Georges, who died after being discharged as a private in the French army. Shippey helped Madeleine and her younger sister by two years, Georgette, get jobs as interpreters for the YMCA, and "Every Sunday and holiday and many a long summer evening they visited historic or beautiful places in or near Paris."

In a column that was later published in newspapers across the country "that the real and ungarbled truth may be known of the famous 'war triangle,' " Shippey wrote that:

For ten months our friendship grew. I came to love the whole family. May 1, 1919, when I was notified that my hotel was to be closed, I went to their home to board, and there was taken into the most beautiful family life I have ever seen. The courage with which they met misfortunes and their sweetness to each other made their home so pleasant that the months I spent there were the happiest of my life.

During this period, Shippey and Madeleine were "married in a church in Paris . . . by a ritual of their own."

===== The 1959 version =====
In 1959, Shippey published a memoir in which he did not mention his marriage to Mary nor the existence of their child. He wrote that he met Georges Babin while the latter was a hospital patient and that Madeleine and Babette had been trapped for two years in a convent school behind the German lines in Belgium. Finally, the girls came home to Paris, via England, and Shippey and a fellow American writer, Homer Croy, went with Mrs. Babin to the train station to meet them. The next day Croy arranged for the two young women to work as interpreters in the organization for which he was the Paris production manager, the Community Motion Picture Bureau.

After the war ended on November 11, 1918, Shippey found his income so reduced "that I could not afford to keep the hotel room Croy and I had shared unless I could get another roommate." By that time, Georges Babin had died, so Mrs. Babin and Shippey agreed that the latter would rent a room in the Babin apartment.

She [Madeleine] and Georgette called me Grand Frere [Big Brother], and thought of me only as an elder brother. Madeleine was fifteen years my junior and seemed younger, and I couldn't be such a fool as to imagine she could think of me in any other way. Besides, it would be tragic if she could, for I was pledged to a woman of my own age back home, a woman so gifted and admirable in many ways that I had set her on a pedestal, though also so temperamental and fond of dramatizing that we quarreled often.

The end of Shippey's feelings for "the girl back home" came when he received a furious letter from her "full of violent accusations . . . concluding with the underscored words: ". . . I'm THROUGH." He felt "strangely buoyant" and gay and, when just about to part from the Babins for the train station to begin his trip back home, Madeleine suddenly "took my face in both her hands and kissed me full on the lips. . . . Through my mind, like vivid lightning, flashed the recollection that once she had said she would never kiss any man on the lips until it meant a pledge of love."

==== Divorce and remarriage ====
In August 1919, Shippey returned to the United States, confessed his love for Madeleine and asked his wife, Mary, for a divorce. She refused. Shippey resumed writing his column, "Missouri Notes," for the Kansas City Star. In November, Madeleine arrived in Kansas City and "revealed to Shippey that she was about to become a mother. Her mother and sister arrived about Christmas." Mary Shippey again refused a divorce but offered to care for the child as her own. When Shippey turned her down, she informed the Star of the situation and Shippey was discharged. (In his memoir, he said he resigned.) He then left for California, and Mary reported the case to American immigration authorities, who in February 1920 opened an inquiry into what the Chicago Daily Tribune called "a Franco-American romance and an American tragedy."

Testimony was taken in secret by the immigration commissioner and a transcript of the evidence, with the recommendations of the immigration inspector regarding deportation, has been sent to the department of labor in Washington for final action.

Lee and Madeleine's child, Henry George Shippey, was born in Kansas City on May 8, 1920. In June the warrants for the arrest and deportation of the Babin family were canceled by Louis F. Post, the assistant U.S. secretary of labor, who noted that the Babin family had come to the United States "at the invitation" of Shippey, who "if he were divorced he would marry the alien, who is about to be, if she has not already become, the mother of his child." The New York Times noted that Madeleine was "supporting herself by sewing and giving French lessons."

In early 1921 Lee and Madeleine were living in Tampico, Mexico, where Lee was editing a newspaper and free-lancing. On January 12 of that year Mary Shippey sued Lee for divorce in a Kansas City, Missouri, court, mentioning the name of Madeleine Babin in the complaint. Mary's petition charged that Lee "habitually consorted with immoral women and now is living in open and notorious adultery with women of well-known immoral character." Lee Shippey responded with a divorce suit in a Tamaulipas, Mexico, court, claiming that Mary's suit was not filed in good faith but rather to "cause grief and injury." He said she had threatened to leave him for another man while Lee was in France and that they had "never lived in the harmony which should characterize the marital relation."

On September 29, 1921, Mary Shippey was granted a divorce from Lee after being on the witness stand for four hours, and the next month Lee and Madeleine were married in Mexico City.

They moved to Del Mar, California, where Shippey struggled as a free-lance writer and was on the contributing staff of the old Life humor magazine.

=== Los Angeles Times career ===
City Hall serves as prop for pencil, 1930.

A story that Shippey had written in 1918 from Verdun, France, telling of the end of World War I attracted the attention of Harry Chandler, publisher of the Los Angeles Times, who commented, "A fellow who can write like that can join the Times family any time he wants to." Nine years later Shippey asked Chandler for a job, and he was hired to "Get out and find human interest stuff anywhere in the State; find out what the ordinary and extraordinary people of California are about; dig up stuff that the tourists, and even the natives have not discovered about themselves."

For the next two decades, Shippey wrote columns for the Times — "The Lee Side o' L.A." and "The Seymour Family," living for some of that time in Sierra Madre, California.

=== Retirement and death ===
Shippey retired in 1949, moved back to Del Mar, where he started writing columns for three San Diego County newspapers — including the San Diego Union and the Del Mar Surfcomber. In 1956, Shippey, then 72, was honored by the Authors Guild of Los Angeles for his "half-century of service as a journalist, author and 'friend to man.' " President Paul Wellman cited Shippey's "astonishing array" of published works and lauded him as a man of "good humor, discernment and, above all, sympathy." He said Shippey had "immense kindliness of spirit," with a "warm grin for everybody and a sage philosophy of life."

Shippey died on December 30, 1969, in a nursing home in Encinitas, California, at the age of 86. He was survived by his five children by his second wife — Henry George, Charles Stuart III, John James, Francis Robert and Sylvia Georgette Thomas. Madeleine died October 20, 1978, in Weaverville, California, and was also buried in El Camino Memorial Park, San Diego.

== Books ==
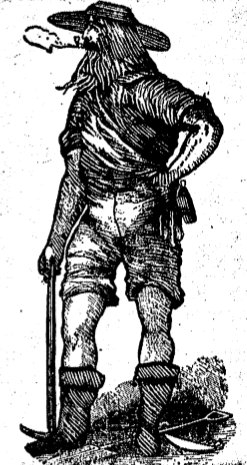
Illustration in It's an Old California Custom

- Personal Glimpses of Famous Folks, 1929
- Folks Ushud Know, 1930
- Where Nothing Ever Happens, 1935
- California Progress; Great Projects Which Overcome Handicaps of the Past, 1936, with Herbert Edward Floercky
- Girl Who Wanted Experience, 1937
- The Great American Family, 1938 Houghton Mifflin
- If We Only Had Money, 1939, Houghton Mifflin
- It's an Old California Custom, 1948, Vanguard Press
- Los Angeles Book, 1950, with photos by Max Yavno, Houghton Mifflin
- Luckiest Man Alive; Being the Author's Own Story, With Certain Omissions, But Including Hitherto Unpublished Sidelights on Some Famous Persons and Incidents, 1959
