= Palestine Park =

Scale model of the Holy Land

Coordinates: 42.2101°N 79.4630°W

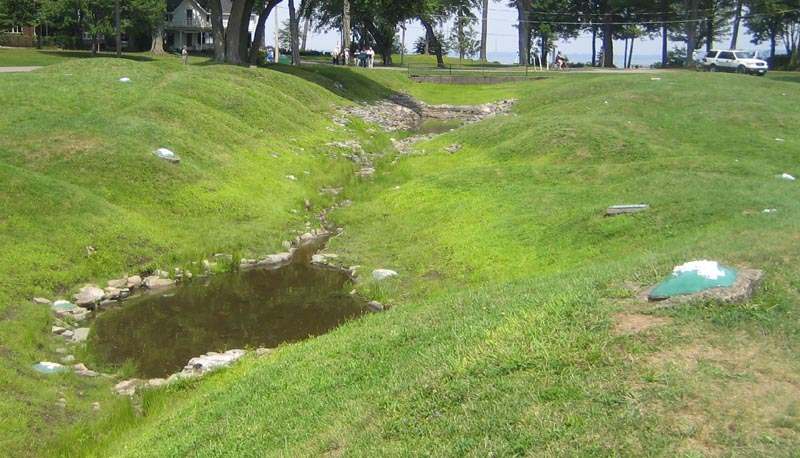
Palestine Park, looking "South" across the Sea of Galilee, and down the Jordan river valley towards the Dead Sea. Markers indicate the position of biblical sites.

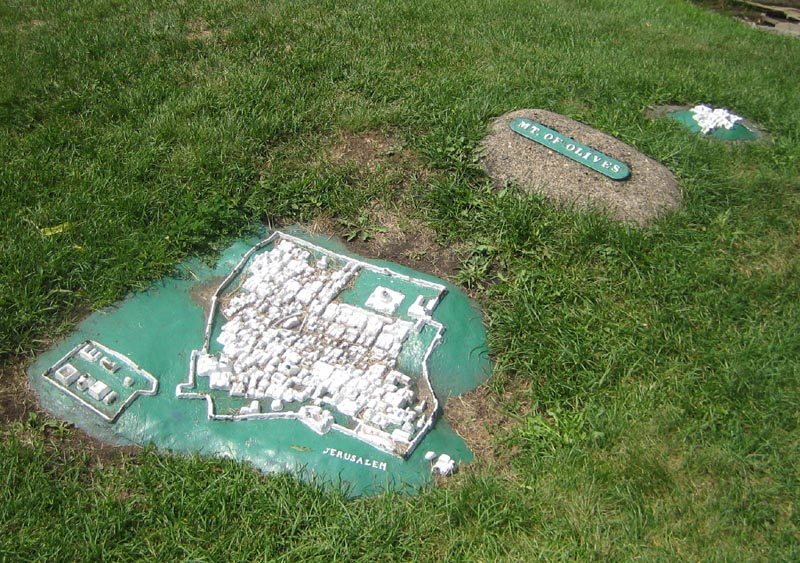
Detail of Palestine Park, showing the markers for Jerusalem, the Mt. of Olives, and the town of Bethany.

Palestine Park is a scale model of the Holy Land, including cities, hills, rivers, and seas, in approximately correct geographical relation on the grounds of Chautauqua Institution in Chautauqua, New York. Palestine Park is laid out along the southwestern side of Chautauqua Lake, which takes the place of the Mediterranean Sea. This creates a rotated version of the actual land, which is on the east coast of the Mediterranean. A large mound of stones represents Mount Hermon, with an artificial stream representing the Jordan River as it flows south from the Sea of Galilee to the Dead Sea. Small hills represent biblical landmarks such as Mount Tabor and the Mount of Olives, with markers representing sites of biblical significance including Jacob's Well, Jericho, Bethsaida and a scale model of Jerusalem in the time of Jesus complete with a small replica of the ancient Jewish Temple.

The park was one of Chautauqua's first landmarks. In 1874, Chautauqua founder Rev. John Heyl Vincent gave his friend Dr. W. W. Wythe the task of laying out Palestine Park as a visual aid for teaching Biblical history and geography to the Sunday School teachers that were Chautauqua's first visitors. In the nineteenth century, people arrived at Chautauqua via ferryboats and disembarked at Palestine Park so that their first footsteps were on the Holy Land as though they were pilgrims going up to Jerusalem; an actual journey to Palestine was well beyond the financial ability of most Americans in that era.

The park has been reconstructed many times over the years. The present Palestine Park is 350 feet long with a scale of 21 inches (530 mm) to 1 mile (1.6 km). The park is a contributing property in the Chautauqua Institution Historic District.

There are educational guided tours through the park each Sunday and Monday at 7 p.m. (weather permitting) during Chautauqua's nine-week summer season.
