= Chautauqua Cinema =

Movie theater in Chautauqua, New York, US

Coordinates: 42.211253°N 79.469762°W

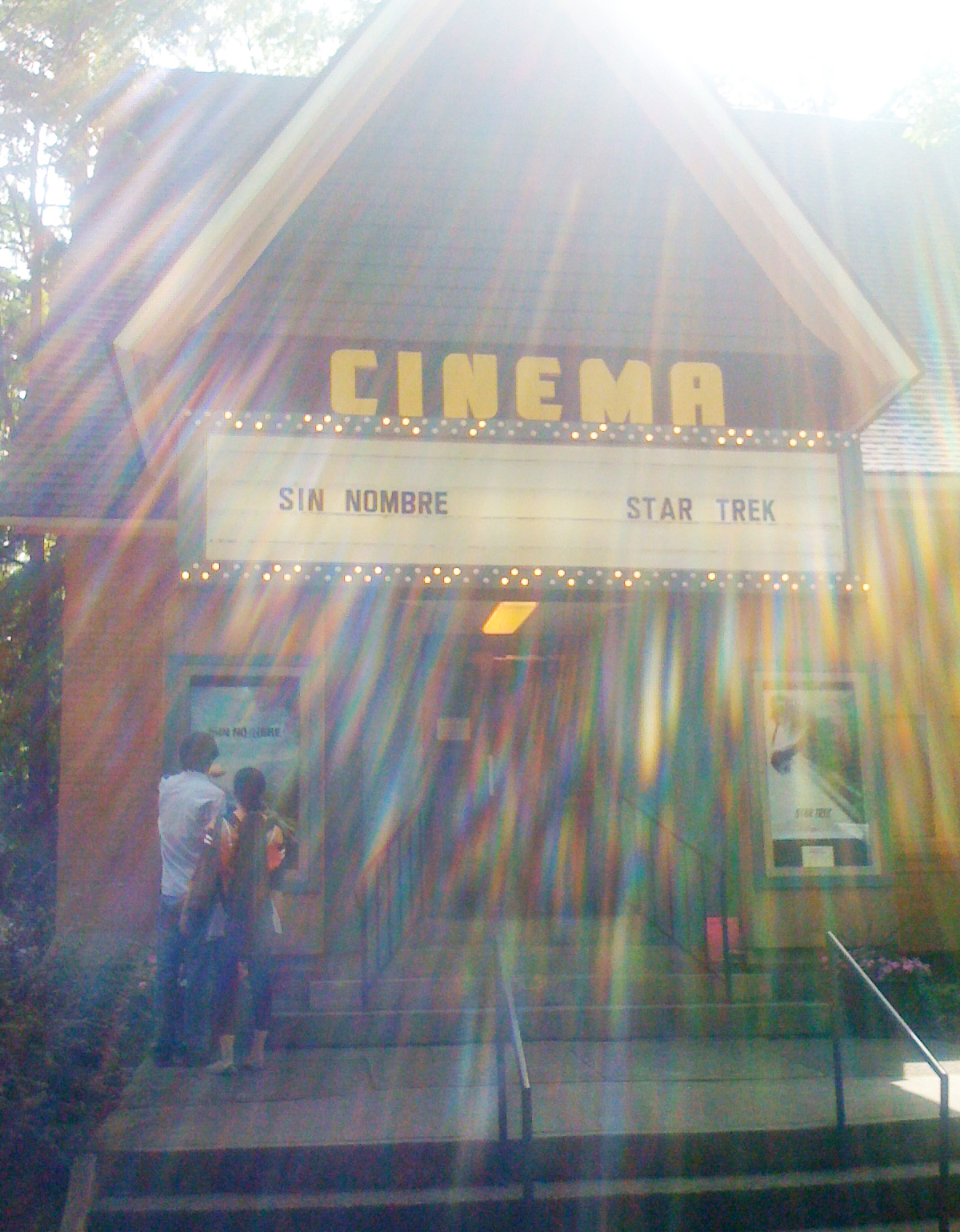
Chautauqua Cinema Marquee, Summer 2009

The Chautauqua Cinema is an independent movie theater located in historic Higgins Memorial Hall on the grounds of Chautauqua Institution in Chautauqua, New York, in the United States. Higgins Hall is a contributing property in the Chautauqua Institution Historic District.

== History ==
Built in 1895, Higgins Hall was used as a meeting and performance hall until 1916 when the Community Motion Picture Bureau in cooperation with the Chautauqua Institution began screening films. In 1938 Higgins Hall was leased to Joseph and Margaret Woodburn who ran it privately. In 1956 the business was bought by Robert and Jessamine Schmidt of Mayville, NY whose family runs it to this day.

== Current status ==
The Chautauqua Cinema features 35mm and Christie Digital projection, Dolby Digital and Datasat Digital surround sound and seats 350 people. The Cinema shows a wide variety of films during a nine-week summer season that runs parallel to Chautauqua Institution's summer season. The films shown are a select program, including independent films, foreign films, documentary films and classics as well as some major Hollywood titles. The Chautauqua Cinema is closed during the off-season.
