= Smith Memorial =

Smith Memorial may refer to the following:

== Awards ==
- Edward E. Smith Memorial Award

== Building and structures ==
- Alfred H. Smith Memorial Bridge in Castleton-on-Hudson and Selkirk, New York
- Jedediah Smith Memorial Trail in California
- Joseph Smith Birthplace Memorial near Sharon and South Royalton, Vermont
- Joseph Smith Memorial Building in Salt Lake City, Utah
- Lawrence Smith Memorial Airport in Harrisonville, Missouri
- Smith Memorial Arch in Philadelphia, Pennsylvania
- Smith Memorial Library in Chautauqua, New York
- Smith Memorial Student Union in Portland, Oregon
- Smith Memorial Playground & Playhouse in Philadelphia, Pennsylvania
- Tina Weedon Smith Memorial Hall in Urbana, Illinois
- Watters Smith Memorial State Park in Harrison, West Virginia
- W. H. Smith Memorial School in Varanasi, India
- William Henry Smith Memorial Library in Indianapolis, Indiana

== Events ==
- Alfred E. Smith Memorial Foundation Dinner
- John Smith Memorial Mace

== Organizations ==
- W. Eugene Smith Memorial Fund
