= Lewis Miller Cottage =

Historic house in New York, United States

- Lewis Miller Cottage, Chautauqua Institution
- U.S. National Register of Historic Places
- U.S. National Historic Landmark
- U.S. National Historic Landmark District – Contributing property
- New York State Register of Historic Places
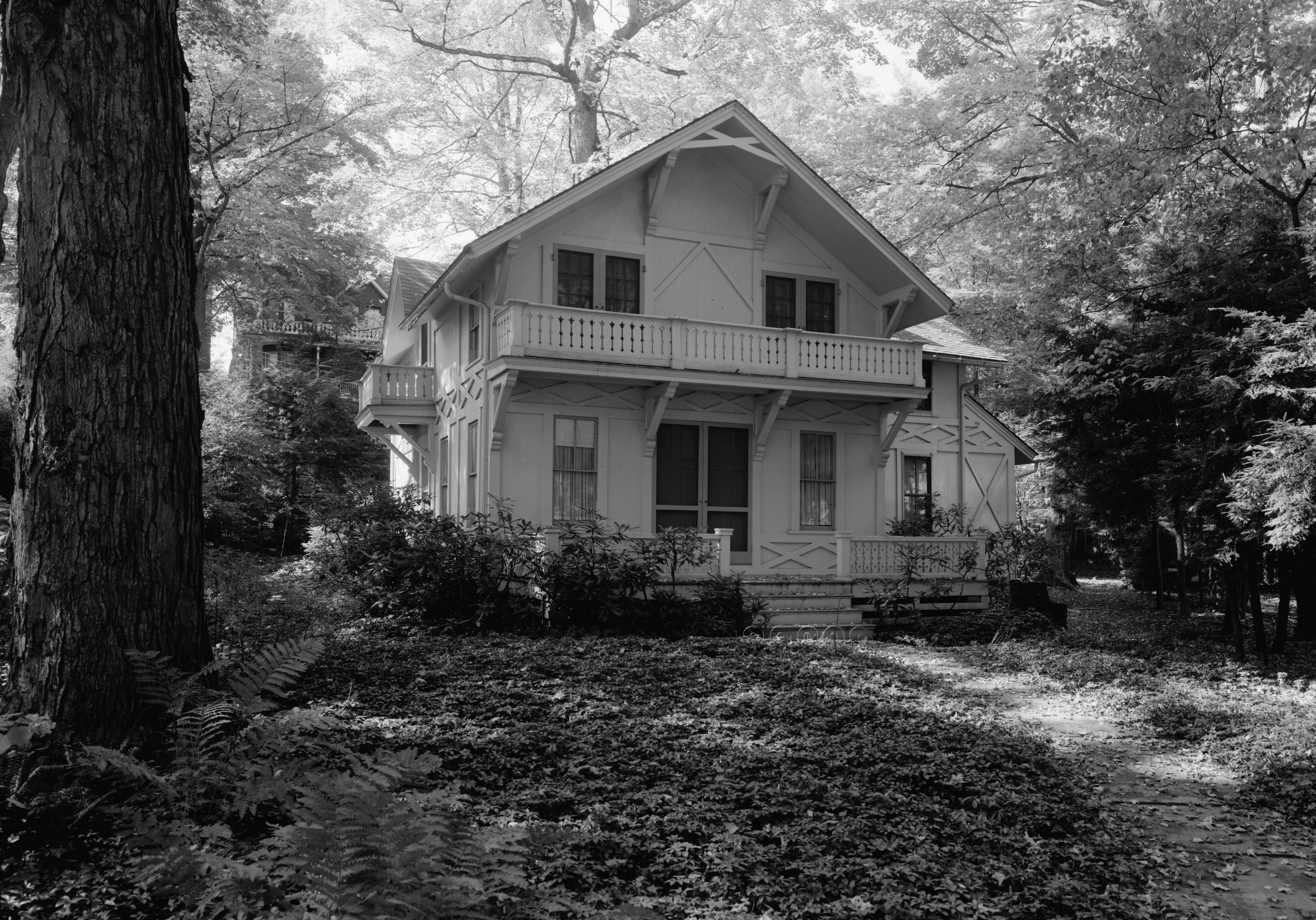
- Lewis Miller Cottage, 1967

- Location within New York Location within the United States
- Interactive map showing the location of Lewis Miller Cottage
- Location: Vincent and Whitfield Aves., Chautauqua, New York
- Coordinates: 42°12′37″N 79°27′53″W
- Built: 1874
- Part of: Chautauqua Institution Historic District (ID73001168)
- NRHP reference No.: 66000506
- NYSRHP No.: 01305.000025

Significant dates
- Added to NRHP: October 15, 1966
- Designated NHL: December 21, 1965
- Designated NHLDCP: June 29, 1989
- Designated NYSRHP: June 23, 1980

The Lewis Miller Cottage is a historic house at Whitfield and Vincent Avenues, on the grounds of the Chautauqua Institution in Chautauqua, New York. Built in 1875, it was the residence of Lewis Miller, co-founder of the Chautauqua movement. It was designated a National Historic Landmark on December 21, 1965.

== Description ==
The Lewis Miller Cottage stands in the village of Chautauqua, at the northwest corner of Vincent and Whitfield Avenues. It is a two-story wood-frame structure, with a broad gabled roof showing Stick style woodwork and large supporting brackets. It has a symmetrical front facade, with sash windows flanking the center entrance on the ground floor, and paired sash windows on the second floor, flanking a center doorway that provides access to the second-story balcony. The first-floor porch and second-floor balcony both have gingerbread balustrades.

== History ==
The Lewis Miller Cottage is considered one of the earliest prefabricated structures in the United States. Miller brought the cottage from Akron, Ohio, and erected it at Chautauqua in 1875, where he entertained US President Ulysses S. Grant that summer.

Mina Miller Edison, Miller's daughter, spent summers at the cottage with her husband, inventor Thomas Alva Edison. She renovated the cottage in 1922. Among the changes, several of the first floor's rooms were made into one large room. Landscape architect Ellen Biddle Shipman developed extensive gardens around the cottage.

In 2016 the Chautauqua Foundation acquired the cottage from Miller descendants Ted Arnn and Nancy Kim Arnn.

== See also ==
- List of National Historic Landmarks in New York
- National Register of Historic Places in Chautauqua County, New York
