= Reginald Lenna =

American Army officer (1912–2000)

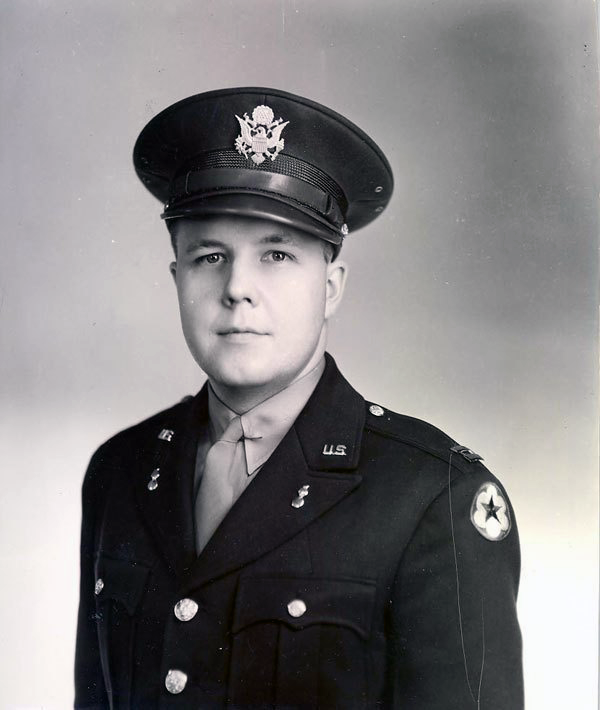
- Lenna (1941)
- Born: Reginald A. Lenna; December 6, 1912; Jamestown, New York
- Died: February 6, 2000 (aged 87); Chautauqua Institution, New York
- Education: Lehigh University
- Occupation: Chief Executive Officer
- Spouse(s): Virginia Buck (1937–1958); Elizabeth Lyons (1961–2000)
- Children: James A. Lenna (1943–1979)
- Parents: Oscar A. Lenna; Hilda Nordstrom

Reginald Alexander Lenna RNO (rej' lɪˈneː) (Jamestown, New York December 3, 1912 – Chautauqua Institution, New York, February 6, 2000) was an American Army officer and businessman. He was the chief executive officer and chair of the Board of Blackstone Corporation from 1951 to 1985.

== Early life and education ==
Lenna, was born in Jamestown, New York, the son of Swedish immigrants, and grew up there. His surname is pronounced as its Swedish precursor Linné (lɪˈneː). He attended Jamestown High School (New York), where he graduated in 1931.

Lenna then entered Lehigh University in Bethlehem, Pennsylvania, where he earned a degree in industrial engineering in 1936, and a commission in the U.S. Army the same year.

== Career ==
Lenna's father, Oscar A. Lenna, migrated to the United States in 1894 from Allerum parish in Skåne, Sweden as a young man. In 1914, Oscar Lenna was the lead investor and CEO of a startup company (Gabrielson Car Parts Manufacturing Co.) manufacturing automobile radiators in Jamestown. The next year the company was renamed the Jamestown Car Parts Company and developed over several decades into the Blackstone Manufacturing Company. Reginald Lenna was employed for several years at this business – during summer holidays and after graduating from Lehigh prior to being called to serve in the U.S. Army.

=== World War II ===
Lenna earned a commission in United States Army while at Lehigh University. In preparation for World War II, he was ordered to active duty. He reported to the office of artillery of the Army Ordnance Department in Washington in early 1941. Lenna was involved in planning for the Invasion of Normandy and procuring machine tools for the Manhattan Project. He reached the rank of major and resigned from the Army in 1945 after World War II ended.

=== Business career ===
In 1945, Reginald Lenna returned to the family business, now the Blackstone Corporation, as the assistant to the president, his father, Oscar Lenna. Since the time of its founding, Blackstone had been a Lenna family enterprise and the family held control of the company's voting stock. During World War II, Blackstone had supported the war effort by manufacturing car and truck parts. Together with his father and brother, Harry Lenna, Reginald Lenna positioned Blackstone to take advantage of the post-war economic expansion of the early 1950s in automobiles and consumer appliances. They significantly enlarged the plant on Allen Street in Jamestown in 1950.

The untimely death of Oscar Lenna and the incapacitation of his brother Harry with heart problems at about the same time left Reginald Lenna as the president and CEO of the Blackstone Corporation in 1951. He continued to focus Blackstone production on consumer products and, by January 1953, Blackstone was engaged in the manufacture of automobile radiators, heaters, and washers and dryers.

Lenna then turned his attention to expanding Blackstone into the international arena. He opened a large auto parts manufacturing plant in Stratford, Ontario, Canada in 1954. He positioned Blackstone to become the major supplier of radiator cores and heat exchangers to Chrysler and Volvo and opened two plants in Sweden. Manufacturing plants then were opened in the Netherlands and Spain. In 1975, a plant in Mexico joined the Blackstone Corporation.

Lenna was also a member of the board of directors of Bankers Trust Company of Western New York, The Uniguard Insurance Group of Seattle, The Struthers Wells Corporation, Associated Industries of New York State, and the Comprehensive Health Planning Council of Western New York.

Lenna retired and sold Blackstone Corporation to the Armstrong Rubber Company in 1985 for $103 million (equivalent to $308.33 million in 2025).

For most of the 20th century, Lenna's Blackstone Corporation was Jamestown's largest employer and one of the driving cores of the local economy.

== Awards ==
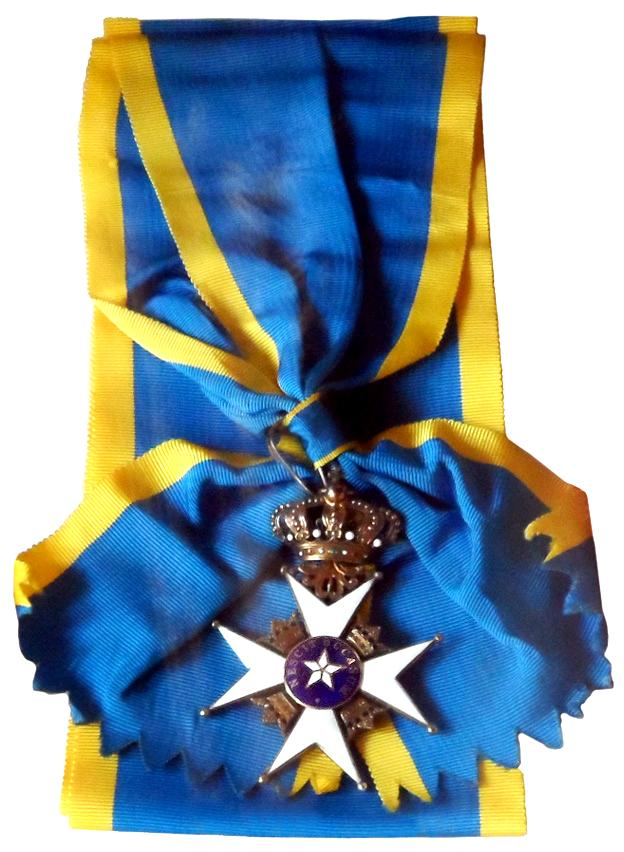
Order of the Polar Star Grand Cross

On April 25, 1976, during a visit to Jamestown New York, King Carl XVI Gustaf of Sweden knighted Lenna and made him a First Class Commander of the Order of the Polar Star (Swedish: Kungliga Nordstjärneorden) for services to Sweden.

Lenna received an honorary doctorate in 1981 from St. Bonaventure University.

== Philanthropy ==
During his lifetime, Reginald Lenna made major philanthropic contributions to Southern Chautauqua County, including:

- The Reg Lenna Center for the Arts in Jamestown in 1987. The facility showcases a wide variety of events including live concerts, movies, ballet, orchestras, gallery shows and more. The center includes a 1,165 seat historic theater, a multi-media arts studio
- The Elizabeth S. Lenna Hall at Chautauqua Institution is another example of his generosity. This 8,000 square foot recital and rehearsal hall, dedicated in 1993, was the first major program facility to be built at the Chautauqua Institution in 65 years. The hall serves as the rehearsal facility for the Chautauqua Symphony Orchestra and Music School Festival Orchestra and as a recital hall for chamber music, voice and piano.
- In 1998, Lenna and his wife purchased and renovated the historic Packard Manor, the largest private home at Chautauqua Institution.
- The Reginald A and Elizabeth S Lenna Foundation, a private grant-making foundation founded by Lenna and his wife in 1986, is the conduit for charitable contributions from Lenna's estate, the bulk of which went to the foundation. Grants are limited to service organizations in Southern Chautauqua County, New York, and exceed two million dollars annually.
