= Jan Kesner Gallery =

Photography art gallery in Los Angeles, California, United States

Coordinates: 34.073934°N 118.314326°W

The Jan Kesner Gallery is a fine art photography gallery in Los Angeles, California. It was the first woman-owned photography gallery in Los Angeles when it was established in 1987. The gallery is known primarily for its focus on contemporary and master works with conceptual or minimal themes, and for its support of regional and international photography.

== History ==
The Jan Kesner Gallery was only the second artistic forum to focus on fine art photography in Los Angeles when it was founded by Jan Kesner in 1987 (preceded by the G. Ray Hawkins Gallery, which opened in 1975).

The Gallery made headlines in 1989 with its controversial Selected Sin group exhibition featuring works by Ruth Bernhard, Imogen Cunningham, Robert Mapplethorpe, Jan Saudek, Andres Serrano, and Edward Weston. The exhibition was a powerful response to government censorship of photography deemed inappropriate, political, or risqué.

In 1990, the Gallery exhibited Vintage Photographs from the 1950s featuring the work of Bruce Bellas, better known as Bruce of Los Angeles. Bellas' photography primarily consisted of the nude male physique, making the Gallery one of the first in the nation to accept the art form in its own right.

== Artists ==
The Gallery has exhibited many notable photographers, including Ansel Adams, Diane Arbus, Imogen Cunningham, Larry Fink, and Lewis Hine. The Gallery also represents a number of prominent artists, among them are John Humble, Richard Misrach, Arne Svenson, Rubén Ortiz Torres, Frank van der Salm, Dan Winters, and Max Yavno.
