= Elizabeth S. Lenna Hall =

Building in Chautauqua, New York

General information
- Location: Chautauqua Institution, Chautauqua, New York
- Coordinates: 42.210010°N 79.471241°W
- Completed: 1993
- Cost: $2,000,000

Technical details
- Floor area: 8,000 square feet (740 m^{2})

Design and construction
- Architecture firm: Assembly Places International
- Services engineer: Klepper Marshall Kings Associates

Other information
- Seating capacity: 500 (Recital)

The Elizabeth S. Lenna Hall is recital and rehearsal hall, located on the grounds of the Chautauqua Institution, in western New York.

== Background ==
The facility was built and dedicated in 1993. It was the first major program facility to be built at the Chautauqua Institution in 65 years. The building was a gift to Chautauqua Institution from Reginald Lenna (le-nā'), a retired local industrialist, in honor of his wife. The original cost of the hall was $2 million, which was equivalent to $4.46 million in 2025.

== Design ==
Chautauqua Institution had long needed a rehearsal facility for its world-class symphony orchestra, which is in residence during the summer season each year. Also needed was a recital hall that could seat several hundred. The result was a dual-purpose building that uses state of the art acoustic control to accommodate both functions. A small hall works well for recitals, but sound can be overwhelming in a small hall when an orchestra performs. Moveable automated draperies and sound-absorbing panels were included in the design of the 8,000-square foot hall to absorb and dampen sound and control reverberation. Tiers of seating collapse into the walls and into a pit in the floor for rapid conversion from recitals to symphony rehearsals. The building has cedar exterior and blends well with the rural landscape of the location. It was designed by Assembly Places International of Philadelphia. Acoustical consultants were Klepper and Marshall and King of White Plains, New York.

== Uses ==
The Elizabeth S. Lenna Hall is the rehearsal facility for the Chautauqua Symphony Orchestra and the Music School Festival Orchestra. It is also a recital hall for chamber music, voice, and piano and hosts many events each season. The facility can accommodate a recital audience of 500 with 30 performers or a 100-piece symphony orchestra in rehearsal with no audience. In 1996, Bill Clinton used the facility to prepare for a televised presidential debate with his opponent, Bob Dole.

== See also ==
- "Elizabeth S. Lenna Hall Archives". Chautauqua Institution.
- "Elizabeth S. Lenna Obituary".
