= Homer Croy =

American novelist

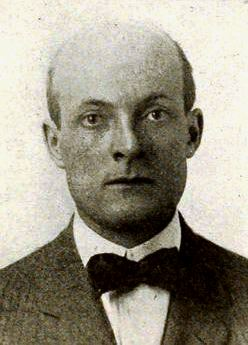
Croy in 1919

Homer Croy (March 11, 1883 – May 24, 1965), was an American author and occasional screenwriter who wrote fiction and non-fiction books about life in the Midwestern United States. He also wrote several popular biographies, including books on outlaw Jesse James, humorist Will Rogers, and film director D.W. Griffith.

== Life and career ==
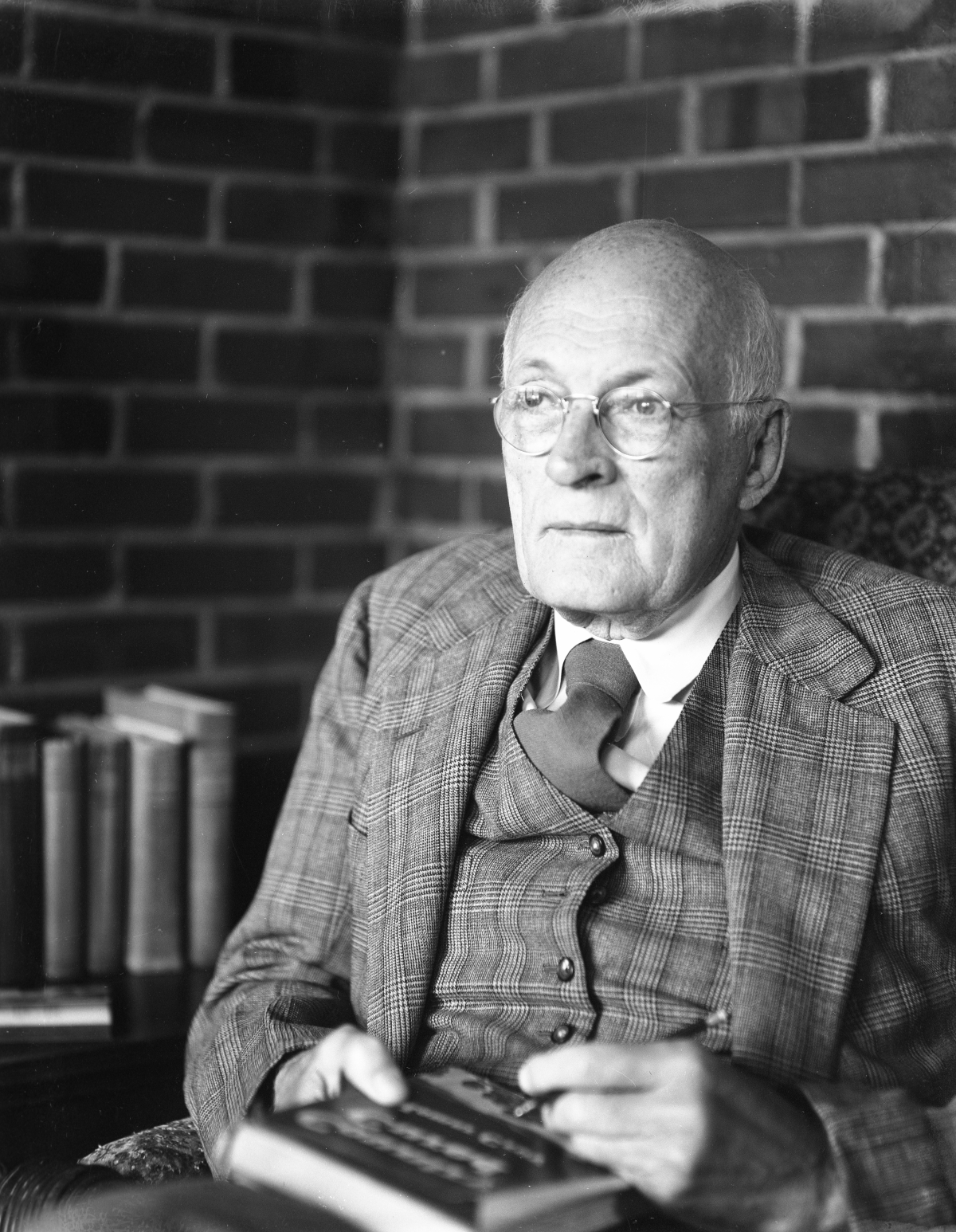
Homer Croy in the 1950s

Croy was born on a farm northwest of Maryville, Missouri. He attended the University of Missouri from 1903 to 1907, but did not graduate after failing an English course his senior year. While attending college, Croy edited the university yearbook and wrote for the Kansas City Star. After leaving college, Croy worked on the St. Louis Post-Dispatch, and later for Theodore Dreiser in New York City.

Croy published his first book, When to Lock the Stable, in 1914. During World War I, he was production manager in Paris, France, for the Community Motion Picture Bureau, which distributed movies to Allied troops. His first successful book was West of the Water Tower, published in 1923. It dealt with hypocrisy in a small town, "Junction City," which was a thinly disguised version of Maryville; a sequel, R.F.D. #3, appeared the following year.

Croy's most famous work was the novel They Had to See Paris (1926) which is about a rural couple from Missouri on a European trip. The book was filmed in 1929 as the first talking picture to star Will Rogers.

Croy had a long but intermittent association with the motion picture industry. Many of his novels and stories were adapted for the screen, and he also directed a series of short travelogue films in 1914–1915; he received screenwriting credits on a handful of feature films in the 1930s. In addition to his biography of D.W. Griffith, he also wrote about the film industry in his 1918 book How Motion Pictures Are Made and a 1932 novel Headed for Hollywood.

Croy's novel The Lady from Colorado was the basis for an opera of the same title by Robert Ward; Croy was in attendance at its 1964 world premiere by the Central City Opera.

Croy was a good friend of the author Dale Carnegie and Carnegie's 1936 book How to Win Friends and Influence People is dedicated to him.

Croy was married to Mae Belle Savell Croy, who was born in Bagdad, Florida. The couple had one daughter, Carol, who was born in 1922.

Croy died in New York City on May 25, 1965, age 82.

== Selected bibliography ==
- 1914 When to Lock the Stable
- 1918 How Motion Pictures Are Made
- 1918 Boone Stop
- 1920 Turkey Bowman
- 1923 West of the Water Tower (made into the lost 1923 silent film West of the Water Tower)
- 1924 R.F.D. No. 3
- 1926 They Had to See Paris (made into Will Rogers' first sound film They Had to See Paris in 1929)
- 1929 Coney Island
- 1932 Headed for Hollywood
- 1938 Sixteen Hands (made into the 1939 film I'm from Missouri)
- 1941 Mr. Meek Marches On
- 1942 Family Honeymoon
- 1947 Corn Country
- 1949 Jesse James Was My Neighbor
- 1952 He Hanged Them High
- 1953 Our Will Rogers
- 1959 Star Maker: The Story of D.W. Griffith

== Selected motion picture credits ==
- 1932 Down to Earth (co-screenplay with Edwin J. Burke; a follow-up to They Had to See Paris)
- 1933 The Cohens and Kellys in Trouble (one of five credited screenwriters)
- 1936 The Harvester (one of four credited screenwriters)

== See also ==
- Lee Shippey, with whom Croy roomed in Paris during World War I
