= Chapel of the Good Shepherd (Chautauqua, New York) =

Historic church in New York, United States

Coordinates: 42°12′20.5″N 79°27′48.1″W

Chapel of the Good Shepherd Since 1894 The Episcopal House at The Chautauqua Institution Chautauqua, New York
- Chapel of the Good Shepherd Since 1894; The Episcopal House at The Chautauqua Institution Chautauqua, New York
- Denomination: Episcopal

History
- Dedication: Good Shepherd

Administration
- Province: Two
- Diocese: Episcopal Diocese of Western New York

Clergy
- Priest: Virginia Carr

The Chapel of the Good Shepherd also known as the Episcopal House or the Chapel in the Woods, is an historic Carpenter Gothic house of worship located on Clark Avenue on the grounds of the Chautauqua Institution in Chautauqua, New York, USA. Its dedication on July 2, 1894, was reported in The New York Times the next day.

The Chapel of the Good Shepherd is a contributing property in the Chautauqua Institution Historic District.
