= Susan Ressler =

American photographer (born 1949)

- Born: 1949 (age 76–77); Philadelphia, Pennsylvania, United States
- Occupation: Photographer

Susan Ressler (born 1949) is an American photographer.

Her work is included in the collections of the National Gallery of Canada, the Smithsonian American Art Museum, and the Harwood Museum of Art.
