= Smith Memorial Library =

- U.S. National Historic Landmark District – Contributing property
- Smith Memorial Library at the Chautauqua Institution

- Location within New York Location within the United States
- Location: Chautauqua, NY
- Nearest city: Jamestown
- Coordinates: 42°12′31.4″N 79°27′56.1″W
- Built: 1931
- Part of: Chautauqua Institution Historic District (ID73001168)

Significant dates
- Added to NRHP: June 19, 197373001168
- Designated NHLDCP: June 29, 1989

Smith Memorial Library is a member of the Chautauqua-Cattaraugus Library System, located on Bestor Plaza on the grounds of Chautauqua Institution in Chautauqua, New York.

The library was constructed from a $69,000 gift willed from the estate of Mrs. A.M. Smith Wilkes. The library serves as caretaker of the Chautauqua Institution Archives, including all Chautauqua Press publications from as early as 1876. It also houses objets d'art, books, and journals which Mrs. A.M. Smith Wilkes collected on her travels.

The building is a contributing property in the Chautauqua Institution Historic District.
