= Theodore Miller Edison =

American inventor (1898–1992)

- Born: July 10, 1898; Glenmont; West Orange, New Jersey
- Died: November 24, 1992 (aged 94); West Orange, New Jersey
- Education: The Haverford School; Montclair Academy (1916); Massachusetts Institute of Technology (1923)
- Spouse: Anna Maria Osterhout (m. 1925)
- Parent(s): Thomas Edison; Mina Miller Edison

Theodore Miller Edison (July 10, 1898 – November 24, 1992) was an American businessman, inventor, and environmentalist. He was the fourth son and youngest child of inventor Thomas Edison, and founder of Calibron Industries, Inc. He was the third child of Edison with his second wife, Mina Miller Edison.

== Biography ==
He was born on July 10, 1898, at Glenmont, the Edison home in Llewellyn Park in West Orange, New Jersey. He attended The Haverford School in Haverford, Pennsylvania, and later the Montclair Academy in Montclair, New Jersey, from which he graduated in 1916. Theodore ended his education at Massachusetts Institute of Technology. He earned a physics degree in 1923 and remained there another year to pursue graduate studies.

In 1925, he married Anna Maria (Ann) Osterhout, a graduate of Vassar College.

After graduation, Theodore worked for his father's company, Thomas A. Edison, Inc., starting as a lab assistant. He later founded his own company, Calibron Industries, Inc., and built his own smaller laboratory in West Orange. He earned over 80 patents in his career.

In later years he became an ardent environmentalist and helped preserve Corkscrew Swamp Sanctuary in southwest Florida, as well as Monhegan Island in Maine. He was also an opponent of the Vietnam War and advocate of Zero Population Growth. He lived in West Orange, New Jersey and died from Parkinson's disease on November 24, 1992.
