= Chautauqua Institution =

Nonprofit center in New York, United States

- Chautauqua Institution Historic District
- U.S. National Register of Historic Places
- U.S. National Historic Landmark District
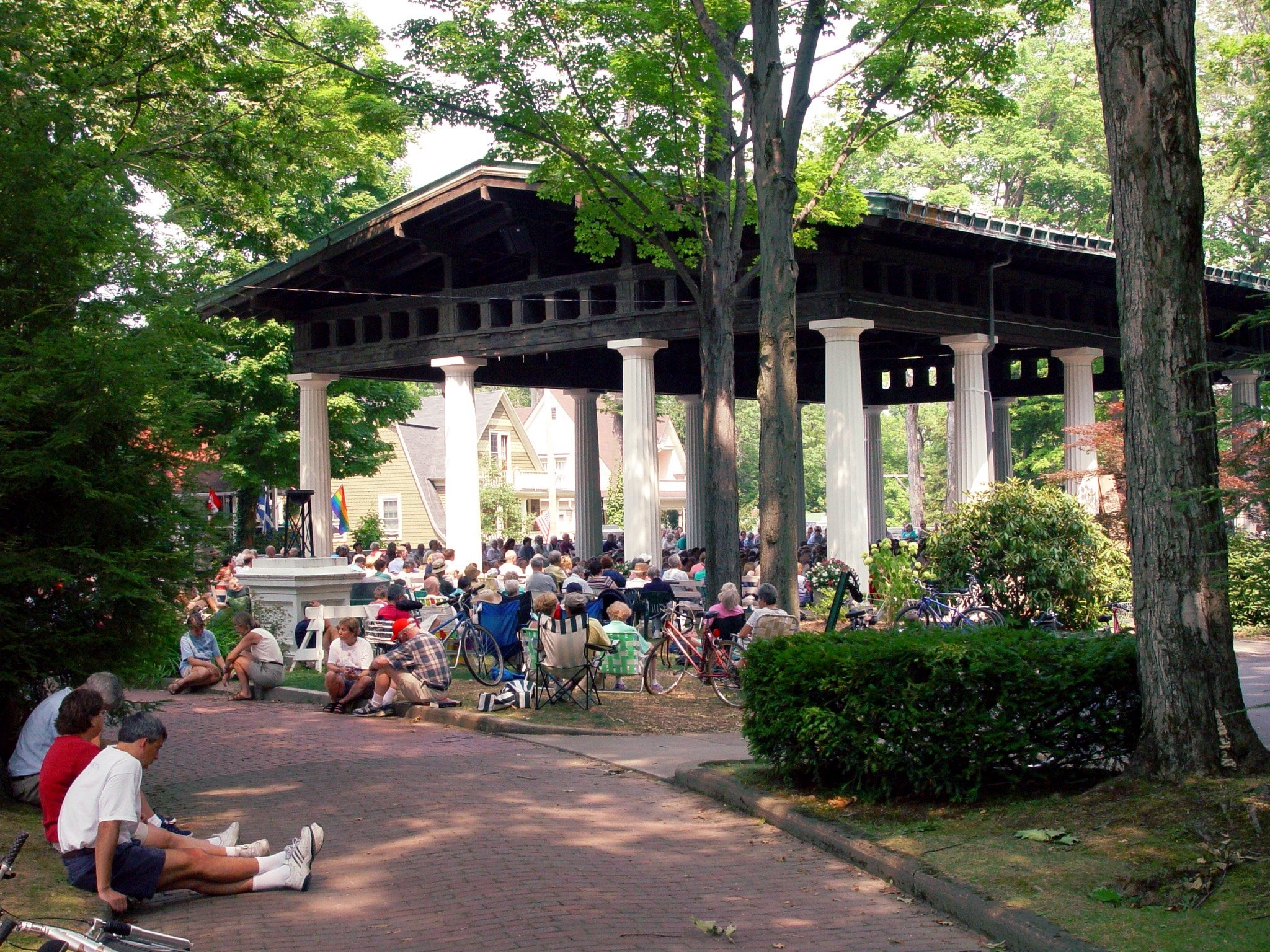
- Hall of Philosophy

- Location within New York Location within the United States
- Location: Chautauqua, New York
- Nearest city: Jamestown
- Coordinates: 42°12′35″N 79°28′01″W
- Area: 2,070 acres (8.4 km^{2})
- Built: 1874
- Architect: John Vincent, Lewis Miller
- Architectural style: Late Victorian and other late 19th and early 20th-century architectural styles.
- Website: chq.org
- NRHP reference No.: 73001168

Significant dates
- Added to NRHP: June 19, 1973
- Designated NHLD: June 29, 1989

The Chautauqua Institution (/ʃəˈtɔːkwə/ shə-TAW-kwə) is a 501(c)(3) nonprofit education center and summer resort for adults and youth located on 2,070 acres (840 ha) in Chautauqua, New York, United States. It is 17 miles (27 km) northwest of Jamestown in the western part of New York state's Southern Tier. Established in 1874, the institution was the home of, and provided the impetus for, the Chautauqua movement that became popular in the United States in the late 19th and early 20th centuries. The Chautauqua Institution Historic District is listed on the National Register of Historic Places and was further designated a National Historic Landmark.

== History ==
Chautauqua was founded in 1874 by inventor Lewis Miller and Methodist Bishop John Heyl Vincent as a teaching camp for Sunday-school teachers. The teachers would arrive by steamboat on Chautauqua Lake, disembark at Palestine Park and begin a course of Bible study that used the Park to teach the geography of the Holy Land.

The institution has operated each summer since then, gradually expanding its season length and program offerings in the arts, education, religion, and music. It offers educational activities to the public during the season, with public events including popular entertainment, theater, symphony, ballet, opera, and visual arts exhibitions. The institution also offers a variety of recreational activities, plus a community education program called Special Studies along with residential programs of intensive study provided for students aiming for professional careers who audition for admittance into Chautauqua's Schools of Performing and Visual Arts.

The physical setting of the institution defined its development as an assembly. The grounds are on the west shoreline of upper Chautauqua Lake. The early tent-camp assembly gave way to cottages and rooming houses, and then hotels, inns and eventually condominiums.

Founder Lewis Miller's daughter, Mina Miller Edison (wife of inventor Thomas Edison) offered literary classes in Fort Myers, Florida, through the Valinda Society. After completing courses, students were given Chautauqua diplomas.

In 1973, the National Park Service added the Institution to the National Register of Historic Places. In 1989, the Department of the Interior designated it a National Historic Landmark District consisting of most of the Institution property between NY 394, formerly NY 17J, the lake and (roughly) Bryant and North Avenues.

== Institution programs ==
Every summer during its nine-week season, Chautauqua Institution provides an array of programs including fine and performing arts, lectures, worship services, and religious programs, as well as recreational activities. Nearly 100,000 visitors come to Chautauqua to participate in these programs and events annually. Summer admission to Chautauqua is by "gate ticket," which allows entrance into the grounds, use of Smith Memorial Library, use of public beaches and parks, and attendance at lectures and concerts. There is an additional charge for some courses, for films shown at the Chautauqua Cinema, for opera and theater tickets, and use of the tennis courts and golf courses. Cottages and rooms are available for long or short term rental. Programming and institution are covered by The Chautauqua Daily print newspaper.

=== Weekly programs ===
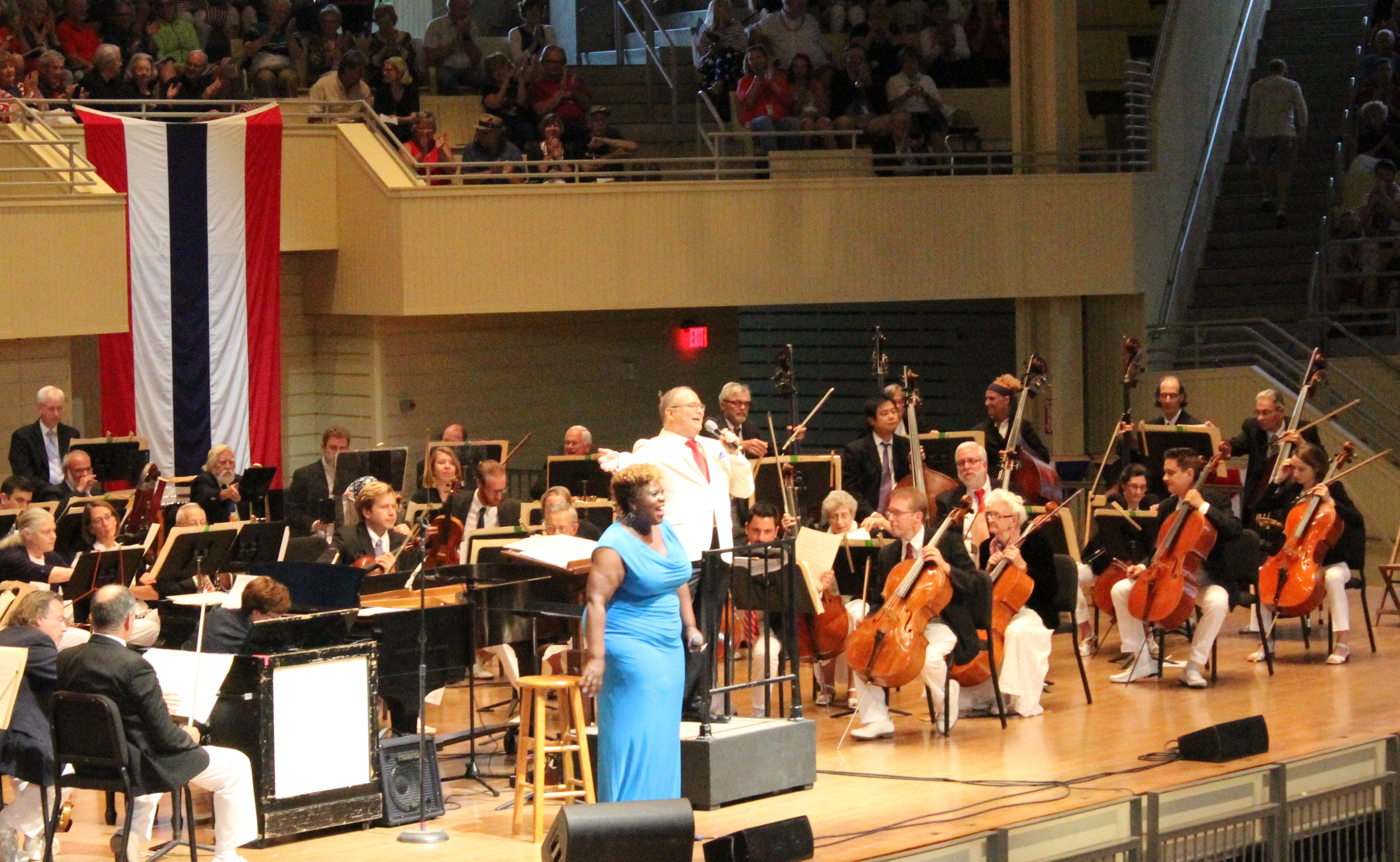
Singer Capathia Jenkins and conductor Stuart Chafetz perform with the Orchestra on the fourth of July.

Programs offered during the week at Chautauqua include devotional services and a lecture on a social, political, or academic issue in the morning, a religious or political topic in the afternoon, and a night of entertainment as the evening program. This evening Amphitheater event may be a symphony concert by the Chautauqua Symphony Orchestra, a dance program by the Chautauqua Ballet Company, or a show by an individual guest artist. During most weeks, there is at least one opportunity to catch an opera and a play put on by Chautauqua's resident summer companies. Operas are performed in English at Norton Hall, a 1930s-era, art-deco structure. There are also regularly scheduled organ recitals on the Massey Memorial Organ, student recitals, masterclasses, forums, and seminars for the sophisticated.

A broad range of special courses in music, art, dance, drama, and general topics are available. The Chautauqua Schools of Music offers extremely competitive programs with scholarships. George Gershwin visited Chautauqua as a summer refuge to compose parts of his Concerto in F in a small, wooden piano studio.

Sundays at Chautauqua feature worship services, both denominational and ecumenical. There is an afternoon Amphitheater program, such as a military band or student dance program. On Sundays, entrance to the Institution grounds is free.

=== Special events ===
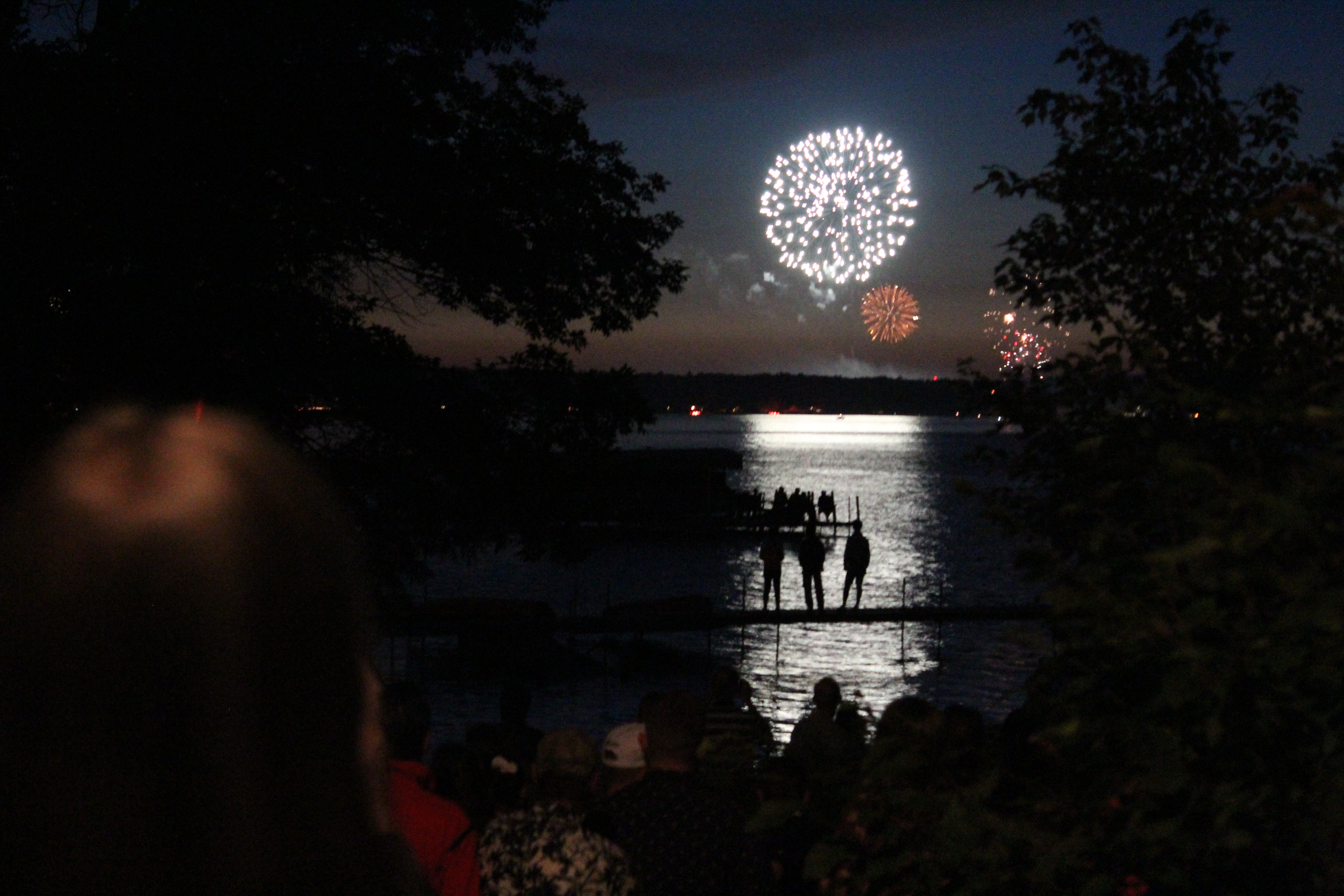
Fireworks above Chautauqua Lake on the fourth of July

There is an annual program held on the first Tuesday of each August called "Old First Night." The event is the "birthday party" for the institution, marking the anniversary of the opening of the first season in 1874. Several of the Chautauqua facilities will host fundraisers, including the Old First Night Run, a fun run around the grounds, hosted by the Chautauqua Sports Club, a lip-sync contest called Air Band hosted by the Chautauqua Boys' and Girls' Club, and a bake sale hosted by the Chautauqua Children's Club. All money raised goes to the Chautauqua Fund.

Another significant Chautauqua event is the Fourth of July show at the Amphitheater specializing in patriotic-themed music followed by area fireworks viewed from the Chautauqua Lake. Occasional town barbecues at the town square (called Bestor Plaza) and weekly sailboat races are part of the Chautauqua experience.

=== Children's programs ===
The Children's School, established in 1921, is a developmental preschool for youth ages 3–5 and was a pioneering program in the field of nursery-school education. The program consists of social, recreational, and educational activities that often incorporate other Chautauqua programs in the areas of music, drama, art, and recreation.

The Chautauqua Boys and Girls Club is one of the oldest day camps in the United States, founded in 1893. While parents are engaging in various activities around the grounds, their children meet in a special area by the lake and participate in sports, art, and recreational games, such as volleyball, sailing, swimming, field games, and pottery.

=== Places of interest ===
The Miller Bell Tower, drawing of which is the logo of the Chautauqua Institution

The institution's grounds, located between New York State Route 394 and Chautauqua Lake, include public buildings, administrative offices, a library, movie theater, bookstore, hotel, condominiums, inns, rooming houses, and many private cottages available for rent during the season. There are about 400 year-round residents, but the population can increase up to 7,500 guests per day during the summer season. The Institution is mostly a pedestrian community with bikes and scooters widely used along with a 12-mph speed limit for cars when authorized to be on the grounds. There are several parking lots located on the periphery that visitors utilize and then walk or bike into the institution:

- The 4,000-seat Amphitheater was demolished in September 2016 to make way for a new theater-style structure, paying homage to the old structure. The new 4,500-seat Amphitheater, completed during the 2016–17 off-season, in time for the institution's 2017 season, features modern amenities and facilities and improved accessibility. This project caused some controversy due to historic nature of the old facility.
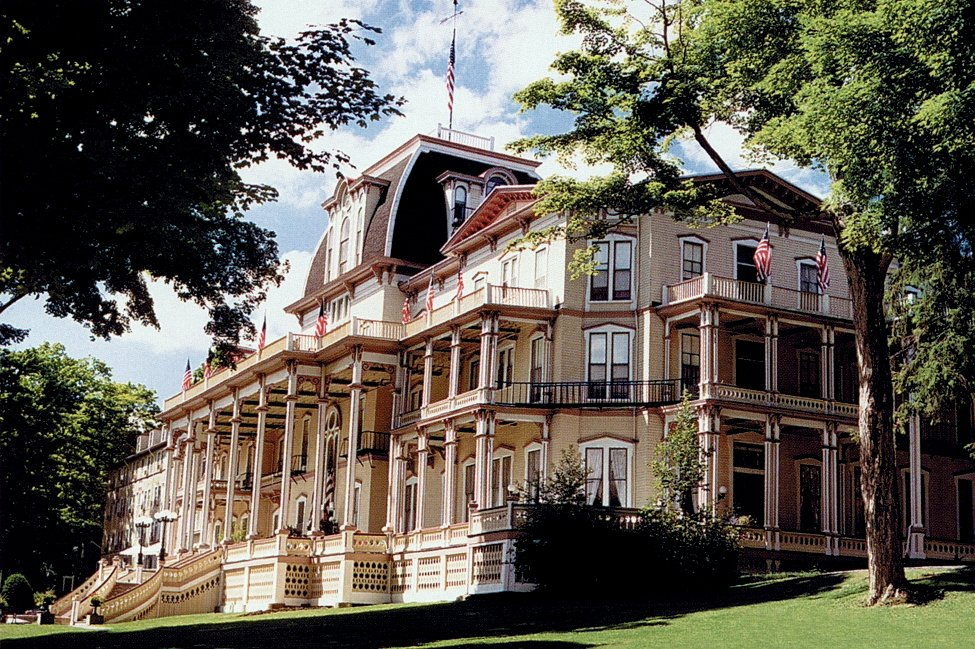
- Athenaeum Hotel
  The Athenaeum Hotel located on the grounds is the only hotel owned and operated by the institution. The 156-room hotel, said to be the largest wooden building in the eastern United States, was built in the Second Empire style in 1881. It has a two-story porch supported by narrow columns, with a central, mansard-covered tower. Although the number of hotel rooms has steadily declined on the grounds in the past thirty years, there has been a corresponding growth in condominiums.
- Palestine Park is a walk-around, landscaped, geographically scaled map of Palestine showing the general contour of the area, including mountains, valleys, bodies of water and the cities in their correct geographical locations, that existed in the first century CE. Throughout the week, there are multiple tours to discuss the historical and religious significance of this world-famous area.

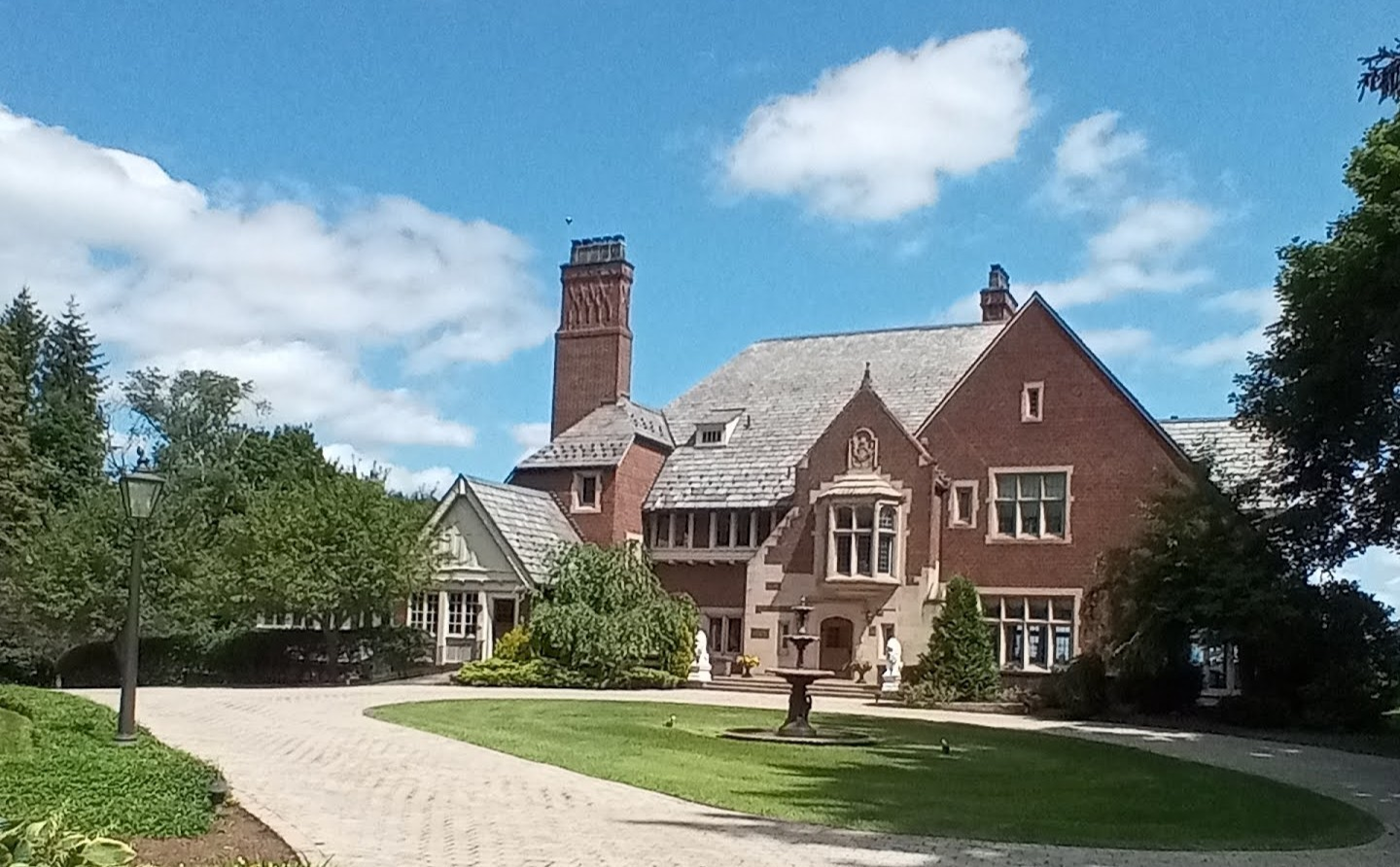
Packard Manor Estate

- The Elizabeth S. Lenna Hall is 8,000 square foot recital and rehearsal hall, dedicated in 1993. This facility was the first significant program facility to be built at the Chautauqua Institution in 65 years. The building serves as the rehearsal facility for the Chautauqua Symphony Orchestra and Music School Festival Orchestra and as a recital hall for chamber music, voice and piano.
- The Lewis Miller Cottage, the residence of Chautauqua co-founder Lewis Miller, was designated a National Historic Landmark in 1965. Erected at Chautauqua in 1875, the cottage was considered one of the earliest prefabricated structures in the United States. Mina Miller Edison, Miller's daughter, spent summers there with her husband, inventor Thomas Alva Edison.
- The Packard Manor Estate is a Tudor mansion on Chautauqua Lake, built in 1915 by automobile manufacturer William Doud Packard and designed by the architecture firm Warren and Wetmore. It became part of the Chautauqua grounds after a 1930s annexation.

=== The Chautauqua Prize ===
The Chautauqua Prize is an annual American literary award established by the Chautauqua Institution in 2012. The winner receives US$7,500 and all travel and expenses for a one-week summer residency at Chautauqua. It is a "national prize that celebrates a book of fiction or literary/narrative nonfiction that provides a richly rewarding reading experience and honors the author for a significant contribution to the literary arts."

=== Chautauqua Declaration ===
The Chautauqua Declaration is an annual declaration made at the Chautauqua Institution supporting international efforts to bring human rights violators to justice. The first declaration occurred following a meeting of current and former international chief prosecutors of international criminal tribunals and special courts in 2007. The declaration marked the 100th anniversary of the Hague Convention of 1907 and included prosecutors from the Nuremberg trials through to the International Criminal Court. In August 2017, the Tenth Chautauqua Declaration was made, signed by prosecutors from the International Criminal Court, International Criminal Tribunal for the former Yugoslavia, Special Tribunal for Lebanon, Special Court for Sierra Leone and the Khmer Rouge Tribunal.

== The Chautauqua movement ==
In the late 19th century, following the model of the Chautauqua Institution, the Chautauqua movement spread throughout the United States and was highly popular until the start of World War II. By the mid-1920s, when circuit Chautauquas were at their peak, they appeared in over 10,000 communities to audiences of more than 45 million. The movement combined several concepts prevalent in the post-Civil War US, including:

- The Lyceum movement which attempted to raise the level of public education with lectures, readings, and entertainment with goals of lifelong learning and self-improvement.
- Camp meetings and revivals which used outdoor gatherings
- Sunday School for the purpose of religious education.

The ideals of the Chautauqua Institution spread throughout the United States through many Independent Chautauqua assemblies. Popping up were a series of traveling Chautauqua meetings, which incorporated many of the program's components, including lectures, music, nondenominational religious studies, and a focus on current issues. Several Independent Chautauquas have survived into the 21st century.

== Chautauqua Literary and Scientific Circle ==
The Chautauqua Literary and Scientific Circle (CLSC), founded in 1878 by Vincent, is one of America's oldest continuously operating book clubs. It was founded to promote self-learning and study, particularly among those unable to attend institutions of higher learning. Originally offering the equivalent of a 4-year degree, the book club now offers certificates of graduation for the completion of 12 books on the historic book list. One book is selected for each week of the summer season, with authors generally coming to Chautauqua to discuss their writing and to talk with readers.

== Famous visitors ==
The Chautauqua Institution has been visited by political figures, celebrities, artists, musicians, scientists, and writers.

Since its founding in 1874, the Institution has been visited by four sitting United States presidents including Ulysses S. Grant (1875), Theodore Roosevelt (1905), Franklin Delano Roosevelt (1936), and Bill Clinton (1996). It was at the Chautauqua Institution Amphitheater that Franklin Delano Roosevelt addressed a crowd of more than 12,000 with his historic “I hate war” speech in 1936. Future President James A. Garfield visited in 1880 and future President William McKinley visited Chautauqua Institution when he was the governor of Ohio in 1895. Former President Rutherford B. Hayes lectured at Chautauqua in August 1892.

United States Supreme Court Justice Robert H. Jackson was a lifelong attendee and lecturer at Chautauqua. John Q. Barrett wrote, "For almost fifty years, Chautauqua was a major part of Jackson’s expanding horizons, intellectual development, study and leisure—it was one of the places he loved best, and it deserves much credit for making him what he became (as he does for advancing it)." Supreme Court Justices Ruth Bader Ginsburg, Anthony Kennedy, and Sandra Day O'Connor lectured at Chautauqua during their tenure on the bench. Future Supreme Court Justice Stanley Forman Reed spoke at Chautauqua in July 1937 while serving as the United States Solicitor General. Future Justice Thurgood Marshall lectured at Chautauqua in August 1957 while serving as a director and chief counsel of the NAACP.

The Institution has been visited by other historically notable figures including William James, Booker T. Washington, Susan B. Anthony, Amelia Earhart, and Eric Foner. Celebrities from the performing arts who performed at Chautauqua include John Philip Sousa, Duke Ellington, Ella Fitzgerald, Lucille Ball, and Johnny Mathis; and contemporary artists such as Rhiannon Giddens, Leann Rimes, Jimmie Johnson, Toby Keith, Harry Connick Jr., Ben Folds, Lyle Lovett, the Avett Brothers, Natalie Merchant, Amy Grant, Allison Krauss, and Clay Aiken.

In August 2022 author Salman Rushdie was stabbed multiple times at Chautauqua when he was about to give a public lecture. In 2024 Rushdie published a memoir of the stabbing, Knife: Meditations After an Attempted Murder.

== Security at the Chautauqua Institution ==
Questions were raised about Chautauqua Institution after the stabbing of Salman Rushdie, although a state trooper and a sheriff's officer were present at the event. Michael Hill, president of the Chautauqua Institution, stated that the Institution had ensured that law enforcement officers were present for the event. He described the assault on Rushdie as "unlike anything in [the institution's] nearly 150-year history". However, one eyewitness claimed that there was no security onstage. One attendee noted that while food and drinks was prevented from being brought into the event, there was no screening for weapons.

It was alleged that the leadership of the Chautauqua Institution disregarded recommendations for security precautions because they felt it would alienate the audience from the speakers. Following the attack, the Chautauqua Institution announced it would require guests to furnish photo IDs to get a Sunday gate pass, which previously could be secured anonymously on Sundays, when there is no fee for entry. Carried bags larger than a wristlet will also be banned in the amphitheater.

== See also ==
- Chapel of the Good Shepherd (Chautauqua, New York)
- List of contemporary amphitheatres
- Revington Arthur
- National Register of Historic Places listings in Chautauqua County, New York
- List of National Historic Landmarks in New York
