= Mina Miller Edison =

American community activist and Thomas Edison's second wife

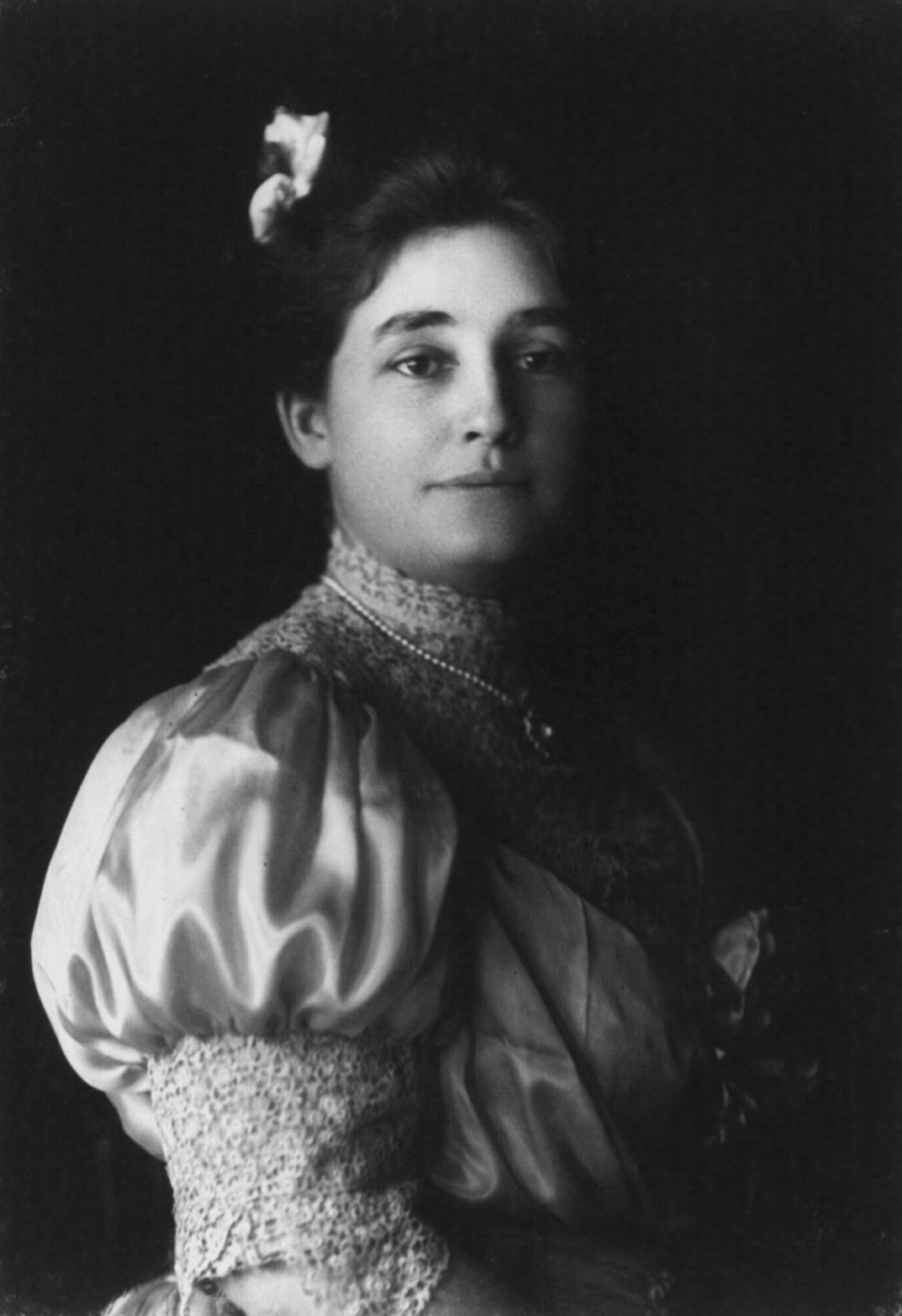
- Mina Edison, 1906
- Born: Mina Miller; July 6, 1865; Akron, Ohio, US
- Died: August 24, 1947 (aged 82); West Orange, New Jersey, US
- Spouse(s): Thomas Edison (m. 1886; died 1931) Edward Everett Hughes (m. 1935; died 1940)
- Children: Madeleine Edison; Charles Edison; Theodore Miller Edison
- Parents: Lewis Miller; Mary Valinda Alexander

Mina Miller Edison (born Mina Miller; July 6, 1865 – August 24, 1947) was an American community activist and the second wife of inventor and industrialist Thomas Edison. She was a community activist in Fort Myers, Florida, known for her work advancing the use of public spaces and education initiatives.

== Early life ==
Mina Miller was born on July 6, 1865, in Akron, Ohio to inventor and industrialist Lewis Miller and homemaker Mary Valinda Alexander. She was the seventh of eleven children. Through her lifelong involvement with the Chatauqua Institution, of which her father was a founder and leader, Mina spent the summers at Chautauqua from the age of 9 to her marriage to Edison. There a young Mina came in contact with many progressive orators, male and female who were interested in education reform, temperance, and women's suffrage. She graduated from Akron High School in 1883 and then went on to study at Mrs. Johnson's Finishing Seminary in Boston.

== Marriage to Thomas Edison and children ==
Mina Miller met Thomas Edison at the home of the inventor Ezra Gilliland, a mutual friend of her father and Edison, in Boston in 1885. After he taught her Morse code, he used it to ask her to marry him. They married on February 24, 1886. At age twenty, the new Mrs. Edison became a stepmother to Edison's three children, Marion Estelle Edison (1873–1965), nicknamed "Dot"; Thomas Alva Edison Jr. (1876–1935), nicknamed "Dash"; and William Leslie Edison (1878–1937). This was not an easy task. Mina and her husband went on to have three more children, Madeleine Edison (1888–1979); Charles Edison (1890–1969); and Theodore Miller Edison (1898–1992). As Thomas Edison supervised his laboratory down the hill, Mina hired and supervised a staff of maids, a cook, a nanny and a gardening staff. She even called herself the "home executive". After 1891 she, not her husband, owned the house which protected the house from being seized to pay Edison's debts if he went bankrupt.

== Charitable work ==
Mina Miller Edison played an active role in the social and civic affairs of West Orange, New Jersey, and Fort Myers, Florida, where the family usually resided for several months during the winter. According to Anne E. Yentsch, this is where Mina's influence can be seen concretely: "As her self-identity changed and her influence grew, her imprint on the riverside landscape of the Edison's Fort Myers, Florida, estate changed the grounds from a utilitarian, working space to a graceful, feminine surrounding". She continues, "Mina Miller Edison broke traditional gendered, social boundaries in a genteel manner and left behind a record in social reform, the urban landscape, and environmental activism that extended far beyond the confines of her home". She was a member of the Chautauqua Association, the National Audubon Society, the John Burroughs Association, and the Daughters of the American Revolution. She also supported the cause of educating the "colored" children of Lee County. In 1907 she became an early member of the Playground Association of America (now called the National Recreation and Park Association as of 1964) and in 1913 joined its board of directors. Four years after Thomas Edison's death, she married Edward Everett Hughes. They lived in Glenmont, the Edison family home. After Hughes died in 1940, she resumed using the Edison name.

She started the Thomas Alva Edison Foundation in memory of her husband.

She died aged 82 on August 24, 1947, in Glenmont, the Edison family home in New Jersey.
