= Max Yavno =

American photographer (1911–1985)

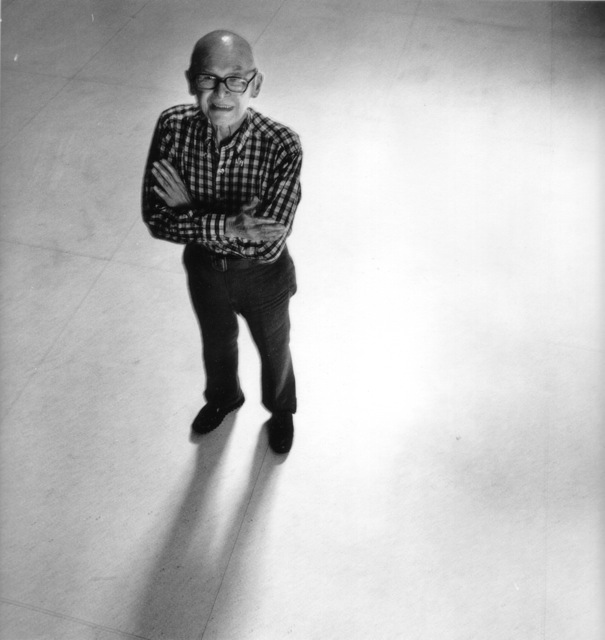
- Yavno in the 1980s
- Born: April 26, 1911; New York City, U.S.
- Died: April 4, 1985 (aged 73); Los Angeles, California, U.S.
- Education: City College of New York; Columbia University
- Known for: Street photography, urban landscape photography
- Spouse: Annie Abramsky (m. 1930; div. 1933)
- Awards: Guggenheim Fellowship (1951)

Max Yavno (April 26, 1911 – April 4, 1985) was a photographer who specialized in street scenes, especially in Los Angeles and San Francisco, California.

== Early life ==
The son of Russian immigrants, Louis and "Lizzie" (Rudnick) Yavno, Max was born in New York City on April 26, 1911. He had a brother, Emil, and a sister, Ethel.

== Career ==
=== Early career and WPA work ===
Yavno worked as a Wall Street messenger while attending City College of New York at night. He attended the graduate school of political economics at Columbia University and worked in the Stock Exchange before becoming a social worker in 1935. He did photography for the Works Progress Administration from 1936 to 1942. He was president of the Photo League in 1938 and 1939. Yavno was in the U.S. Army Air Corps from 1942 to 1945, after which he moved to San Francisco and began specializing in urban-landscape photography.

=== Commercial photography ===
History professor Constance B. Schulz said of Yavno, "For financial reasons, he worked as a commercial advertising photographer for the next twenty years (1954–75), creating finely crafted still lifes that appeared in Vogue and Harper's Bazaar. He returned to artistic landscape photography in the 1970s, when his introspective approach found a more appreciative audience. Funding from the National Endowment for the Arts enabled him to travel to Egypt and Israel in 1979."

=== Subjects and notable works ===
He also captured a pre-Dodgers Chavez Ravine, a giant plaster leg on top of a building in West Los Angeles and a "nostalgic" shot of a cable car being turned around at Powell and Market streets in San Francisco.

His noted photograph of a crowd watching "sun-worshipping body builders at Muscle Beach in Venice" sold at auction in 1984 for almost $4,000. He said he had spent three Sundays at the beach before the subjects "stopped flexing for his camera and resumed posing for each other."

In 1967, Yavno's photograph of a Greyhound bus was commissioned by artist Mason Williams for a life-sized screenprint titled Bus. The photograph was enlarged and printed on 16 pieces of billboard paper; the finished work measured approximately 10 by 36 feet (3.0 m × 11.0 m). Bus was published in an edition of 200, toured the country, and was shown at venues including MoMA and Radio City Music Hall.

== Personal life ==
Yavno was married to Annie Abramsky in 1930 at age 19 and divorced three years later.

He died in Los Angeles on April 4, 1985, of complications resulting from a fall in a shower.

== Legacy ==
In his Los Angeles Times obituary of Yavno, Jack Jones reported that Melrose Avenue photo gallery owner G. Ray Hawkins, who represented Yavno and exhibited his works, called him a "social documentarian" and noted that he had "a very special ability for combining composition and content while capturing his social vignettes."

Photographer Edward Steichen selected twenty of Yavno's prints for the permanent collection at New York's Museum of Modern Art in 1950, and the next year Yavno won a Guggenheim Fellowship.

Yavno's work was featured in a 2025 San Diego Museum of Art exhibition John Gutmann & Max Yavno: California Photographers. His work is in the museum's permanent collection.

== Books ==
Yavno's photographs accompanied text by newspaper columnists in two books:

- Caen, Herb (1948). The San Francisco Book. Houghton Mifflin. OCLC 492489.
- Shippey, Lee (1950). The Los Angeles Book. Houghton Mifflin. OCLC 1468961.
