= Community Motion Picture Bureau =

During World War I, the Community Motion Picture Bureau was an American organization that "would supply about four thousand picture shows a week to YMCA, Red Cross, Salvation Army, Jewish Welfare Board, Knights of Columbus or any other accredited organization supplying entertainment for troops." Homer Croy of Missouri was production manager for the agency in Paris, France.
