= John H. Vincent =

American theologian and bishop (1832–1920)

John Heyl Vincent
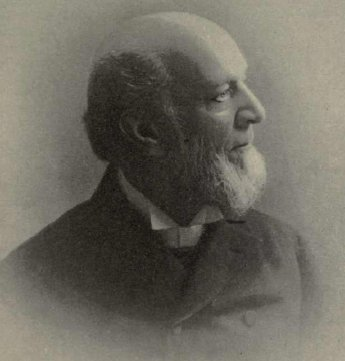
- Born: February 23, 1832; Tuscaloosa, Alabama
- Died: May 9, 1920 (aged 88); Buried - Portville, New York
- Occupation: Methodist Episcopal bishop

Signature
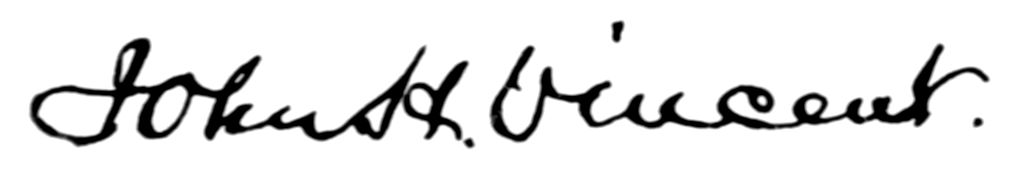

John Heyl Vincent (February 23, 1832 – May 9, 1920) was an American bishop of the Methodist Episcopal Church.

== Biography ==
He was born at Tuscaloosa, Ala., and was educated at Lewisburg (Pa.) Academy and at Wesleyan Institute, Newark, N. J. He entered the New Jersey Conference in 1853, and was transferred to the Rock River Conference in 1857. He was pastor of churches in Chicago and established the Northwest Sunday-School Quarterly (1865) and the Sunday-School Teacher (1866). He was the corresponding secretary of the Sunday-school Union of his denomination and editor of its publications (1868–1884). In 1888, he was elected Bishop and was appointed Resident Bishop in Europe in 1900, stationed at Zurich, Switzerland; in 1904, he retired from the active episcopate. He was a co-founder of the Chautauqua Assembly (1874), and chancellor of Chautauqua Institution from its organization (1878).

In 1899 he was awarded American Library Association Honorary Membership.

== Publications ==
- The Chautauqua Movement (1886)
- The Church School and Its Officers (1886)
- Studies in Young Life (1890)
- A Study in Pedagogy (1890)
- Earthly Footsteps of the Man of Galilee (1894)
- Family Worship for Every Day in the Year (1905)

== Sources ==
- Oyen, Henry (May 1912). "The Founder of "Chatauquas"". The World's Work: A History of Our Time. XXIV: 100–101.
